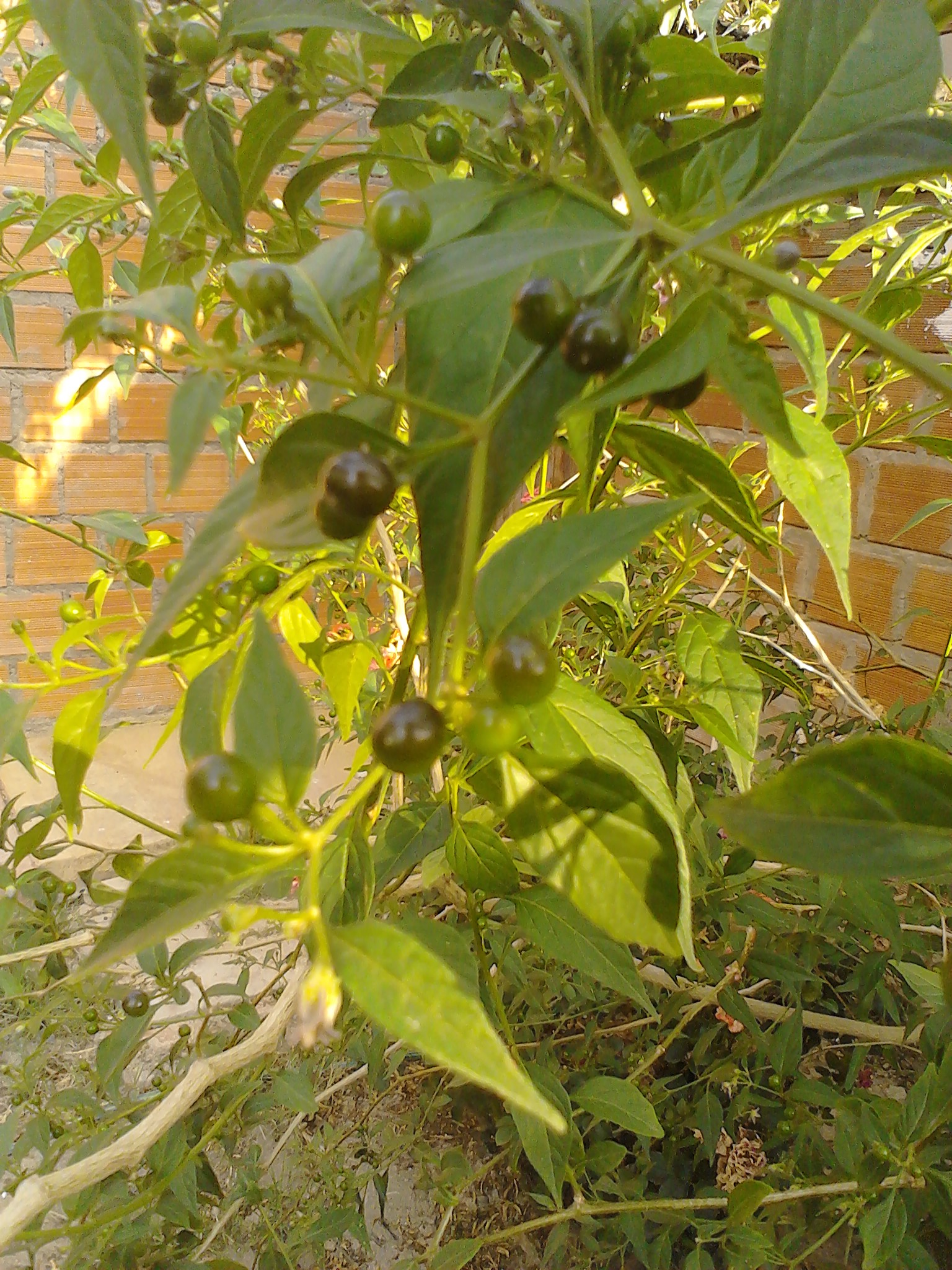
- C. cardenasii plant with immature fruit

Scientific classification
- Kingdom: Plantae
- Clade: Tracheophytes
- Clade: Angiosperms
- Clade: Eudicots
- Clade: Asterids
- Order: Solanales
- Family: Solanaceae
- Genus: Capsicum
- Species: C. cardenasii

Binomial name
- Capsicum cardenasii Heiser & P.G.Sm.

= Capsicum cardenasii =

Species of flowering plant

Capsicum cardenasii is a plant species in the genus Capsicum and the family Solanaceae. It is a diploid with 2n=2x=24. It is a member within the C. pubescens complex, a group of closely related Capsicum species. It is closely related to C. eximium. It is native to the Andes, and it can be found in Bolivia and Peru. The native name is ulupica.

== Vegetative characteristics ==
Capsicum cardenasii, like most members of the Pubescens complex, is a perennial plant that develops woody stems. The plant can grow up 2–3 feet high with a width of 1-1.5 feet. The leaves are narrow, lanceolate and pubescent. Plants generally produce between 1 and 2 flowers at the internodes. The petioles grow erect and have campanulate, pendant flowers. The corolla is white and purple colored. The plant produces small, fleshy, red fruit. It is likely the wild ancestor of rocoto peppers.

The plant requires a cool, freeze free environment and long growing season similar to its native environment in the Andes.

== Reproduction ==
After fertilization C. cardenasii develops small round red berries, sometimes referred to as chiltepins. The fruits contain a small number of seed. The fruit are pungent, near 30 000 SHU (Scoville Heat Units), making them quite spicy.

Capsicum cardenasii is self-incompatible, and exhibits unilateral incompatibility with species outside the pubescens clade.

== Uses ==
Its primary use is as a spice. Many wild Capsicums exhibit disease resistance of interest to plant breeders. C. cardenasii has been shown to be resistant to tobacco mosaic virus (TMV), and there is a possibility that one day this resistance may be transferred to other capsicum species through breeding.
