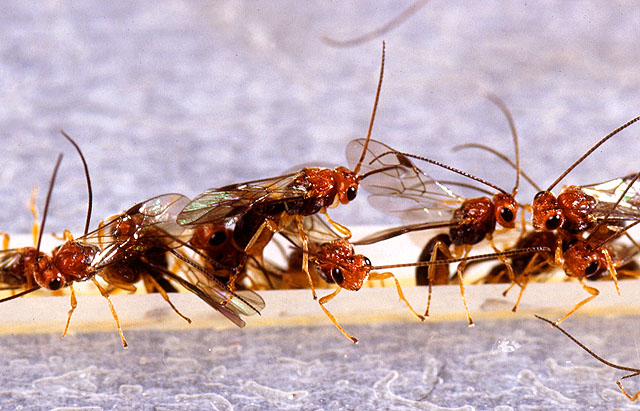

Scientific classification
- Kingdom: Animalia
- Phylum: Arthropoda
- Class: Insecta
- Order: Hymenoptera
- Family: Braconidae
- Genus: Biosteres; Förster, 1862

= Biosteres =

Genus of wasps

Biosteres is a genus of wasps belonging to the family Braconidae.

The genus was first described by Förster in 1862.

The genus has almost cosmopolitan distribution.

Species:

- Biosteres arenarius (Stelfox, 1959) - also known as Opius arenarius in Ireland, found in France, Germany, Turkey, and Iran
- Biosteres blandus (Haliday, 1837) - also known as Opius blandus, hosts include Pegomya and Agromyza
- Biosteres brevipalpis (Thomson, 1895)
- Biosteres carbonarius Nees, 1834
- Biosteres haemorrhoeus (Haliday, 1837) - hosts are of the genus Pegomya, including P. bicolor
- Biosteres longicauda (Thomson, 1895)
- Biosteres spinaciae (Thomson, 1895)
- Biosteres tryoni (Cameron, 1911) - parasitoid of Ceratitis capitata
- Biosteres wesmaelii Haliday, 1837
- Biosteres vandenboschi
