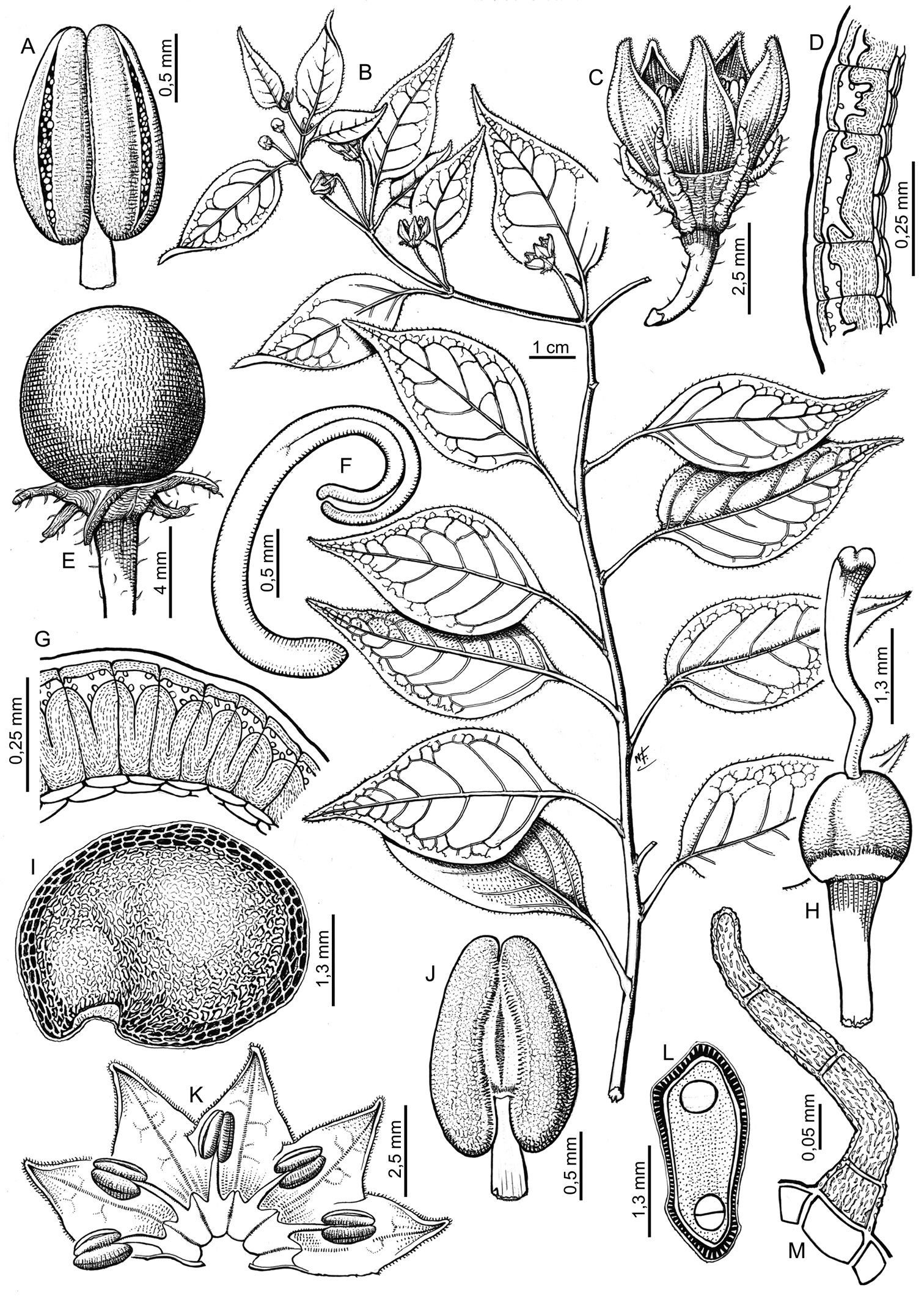
- Botanical diagram of Capsicum eximium

Scientific classification
- Kingdom: Plantae
- Clade: Tracheophytes
- Clade: Angiosperms
- Clade: Eudicots
- Clade: Asterids
- Order: Solanales
- Family: Solanaceae
- Genus: Capsicum
- Species: C. eximium

Binomial name
- Capsicum eximium Hunz

= Capsicum eximium =

Species of flowering plant

Capsicum eximium is a member of the genus Capsicum, and native to the New World, specifically the Andean region of South America. It is one of the "purple-flowered" Capsicums along with Capsicum cardenasii and Capsicum pubescens. Like most other chili peppers, it is both pungent and self-compatible. It is a member of the Pubescens complex, a natural group of highly related Capsicums. Natural hybrids between C. pubescens as well as C. tovarii have been found, further supporting the relationship of these species.

== Plant description ==
Capsicum eximium is identified by its distinctive purple flowers. The flowers have an entire calyx and bell-shaped corolla that come in various shades of purple. Mature fruit of C. eximium are small, shiny, non-pulpy berries. The seeds are yellow.

== Uses ==
In Bolivia, where the plants occur naturally, C. eximium is used as a spice. Also, since it is a wild pepper species, it has been used extensively in phylogenetic studies to better understand the relationships of peppers and different gene models.
