= Pegomya depressiventris =

Scientific classification
- Domain: Eukaryota
- Kingdom: Animalia
- Phylum: Arthropoda
- Class: Insecta
- Order: Diptera
- Family: Anthomyiidae
- Genus: Pegomya
- Species: P. depressiventris

Binomial name
- Pegomya depressiventris (Zetterstedt, 1845)

Species of fly

Pegomya depressiventris is a species of root-maggot fly (insects in the family Anthomyiidae).
