= Pegomya wygodzinskyi =

Scientific classification
- Domain: Eukaryota
- Kingdom: Animalia
- Phylum: Arthropoda
- Class: Insecta
- Order: Diptera
- Family: Anthomyiidae
- Genus: Pegomya
- Species: P. wygodzinskyi

Binomial name
- Pegomya wygodzinskyi Alexander, 1962

Species of fly

Pegomya wygodzinskyi is a species of root-maggot flies (insects in the family Anthomyiidae).
