= Pegomya atlanis =

Scientific classification
- Kingdom: Animalia
- Phylum: Arthropoda
- Class: Insecta
- Order: Diptera
- Family: Anthomyiidae
- Subfamily: Pegomyinae
- Tribe: Pegomyini
- Genus: Pegomya
- Species: P. atlanis

Binomial name
- Pegomya atlanis (Fabricius, 1798)

Species of fly

Pegomya atlanis is a species of root-maggot fly (insects in the family Anthomyiidae). It feeds on Chenopodium album as a leaf miner.
