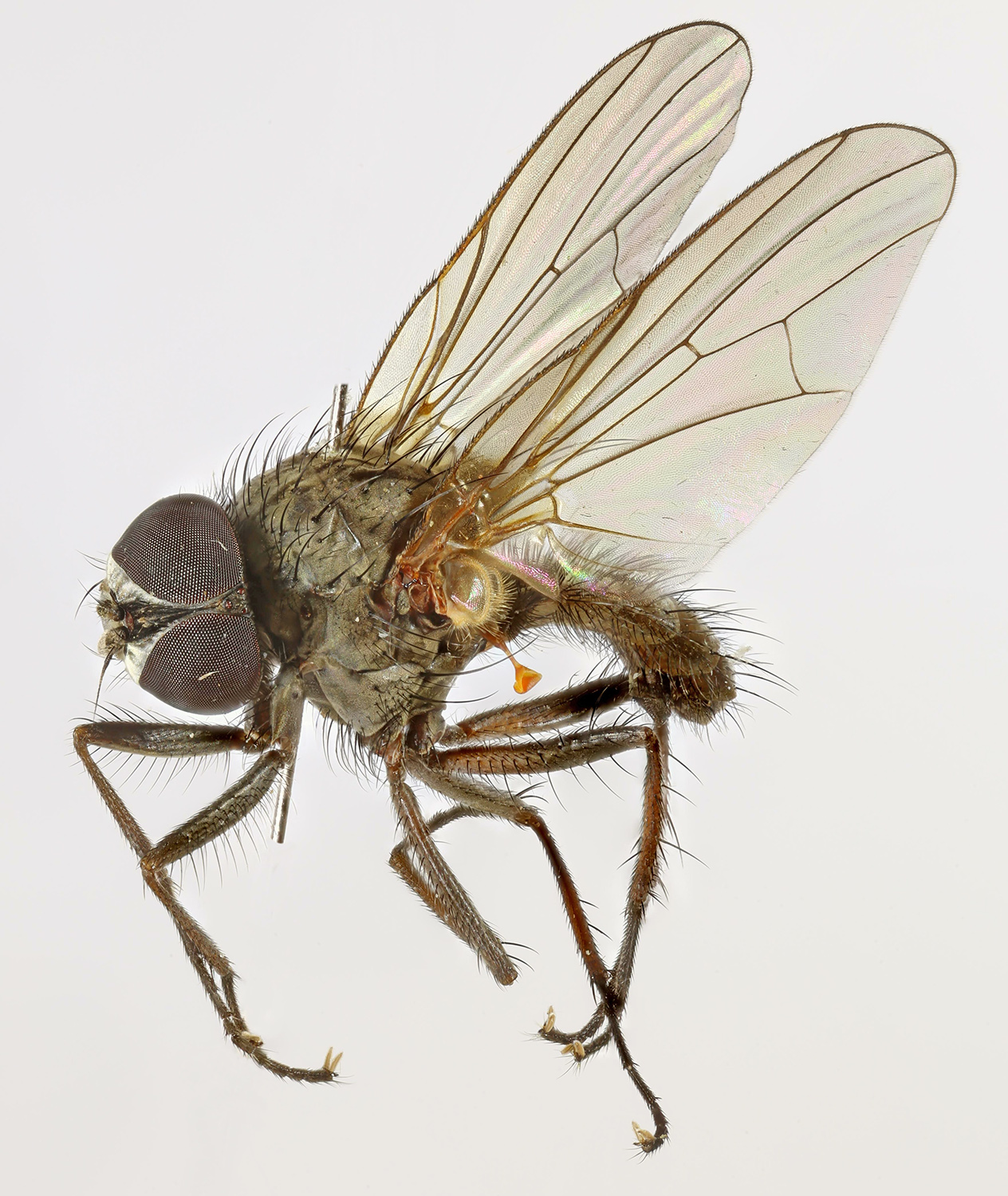
- Pegomya flavifrons

Scientific classification
- Domain: Eukaryota
- Kingdom: Animalia
- Phylum: Arthropoda
- Class: Insecta
- Order: Diptera
- Family: Anthomyiidae
- Genus: Pegomya
- Species: P. flavifrons

Binomial name
- Pegomya flavifrons Cresson, 1863

= Pegomya flavifrons =

Species of fly

Pegomya flavifrons is a species of root-maggot fly (insects in the family Anthomyiidae).
