= Rocoto relleno =

Common Peruvian dish

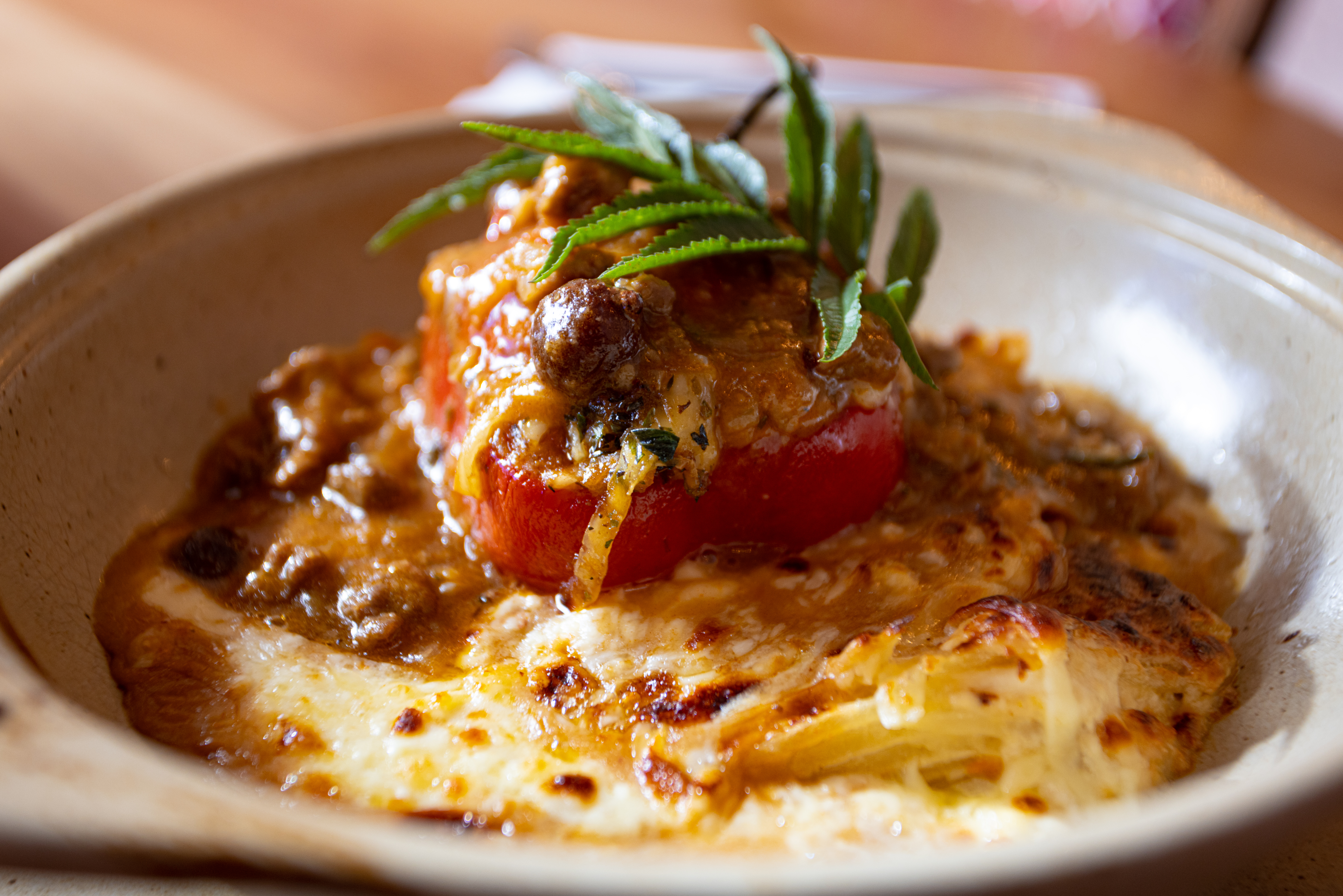
Rocoto relleno

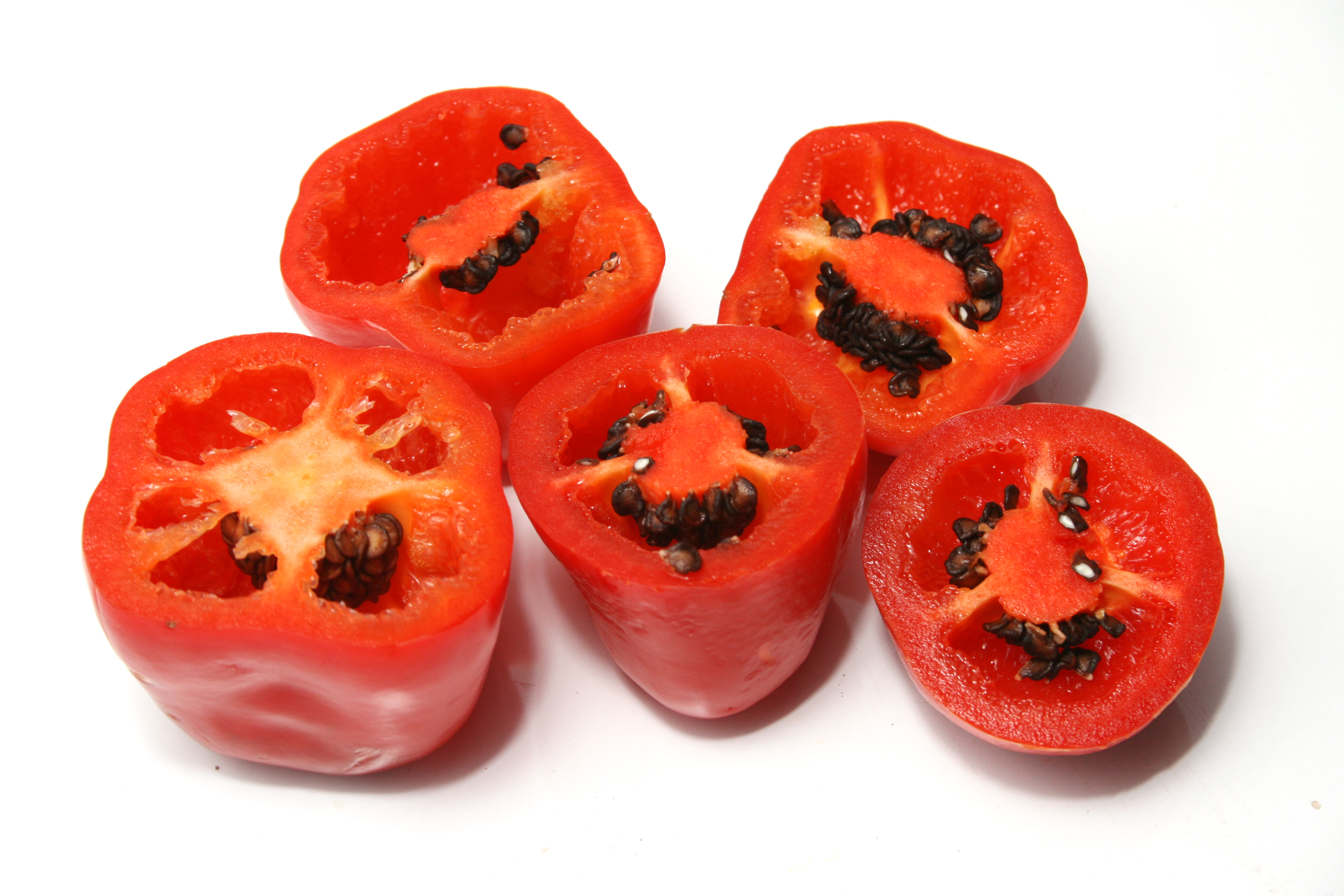
Rocotos or Capsicum pubescens

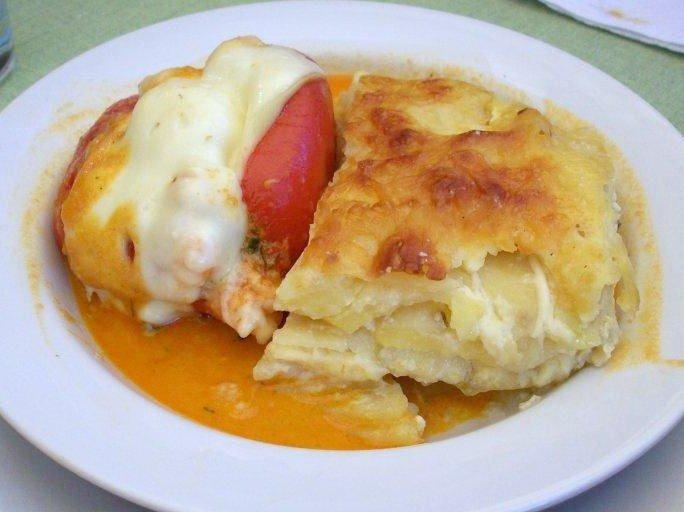
Rocoto relleno (variant)

Rocoto relleno is the Peruvian variety of stuffed peppers, a dish popular in the city of Arequipa, a city in the Andes mountains located in the southern parts of Peru which is famous for its take on dishes derived originally from Spain. Rocoto peppers were cooked in water and vinegar to remove as much spiciness as possible. Minced meat is placed inside the rocotos and is then topped with melted cheese, baked and served whole. Rocotos are capsicum pubescens which are at least ten times spicier than jalapeño when raw. This is considered one of the most famous dishes of Peru and served all over the world.

== Characteristics ==
This dish takes a while to prepare. The dish is only mildly spicy and the stuffing inside the rocoto can include anything. The most popular stuffing is a beef-mix which contains beef, pork, onions, garlics, margarine (butter) cream and pecans. Putting a hard-boiled egg inside the rocoto is also very popular way to serve.

== Ingredients ==
Rocotos, red vinegar, chopped beef, chopped pork, olive oil, tomato sauce, white wine, cream, pecans, beef stock, aji panca paste, potatoes, red onion, garlic, margarine, flour, mozzarella cheese, parmesan cheese.

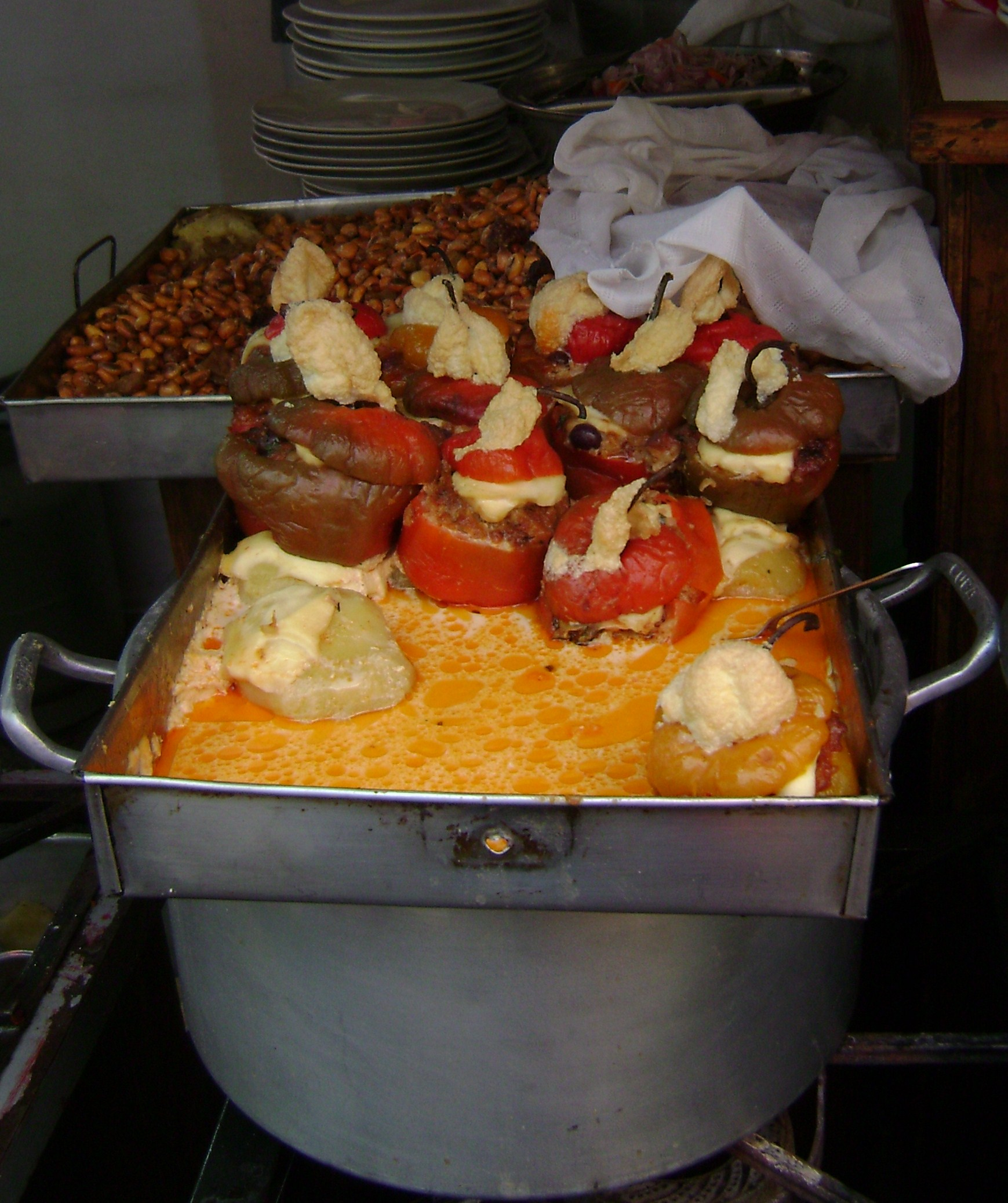
Stuffed rocoto rellenos, fresh out of oven.

== Preparation ==
The rocoto relleno is generally prepared by stuffing the rocotos with an ideal beef-mix and then topped with cheese. Then it is put inside the oven with tomato sauce and served whole with baked potatoes or salad.
Preparation of the rocotos: First the upper parts of the rocotos are cut off and seeds are removed. The rocotos are then cooked in water with salt and vinegar to get the worst of the heat out.

Preparation of the stuffing: Chopped beef and pork are mixed with a seasoning made of margarine, ground garlic, onion, and aji panca paste. The beef-mix is then mixed with pecans, flour, stock and cream and then fried in olive oil with tomato sauce and wine.

== History ==
The Incas prized the rocoto for its special flavor and cultivated it around 1.500 to 2.900 meters above sea level. This dish was the most common way to prepare rocoto.
