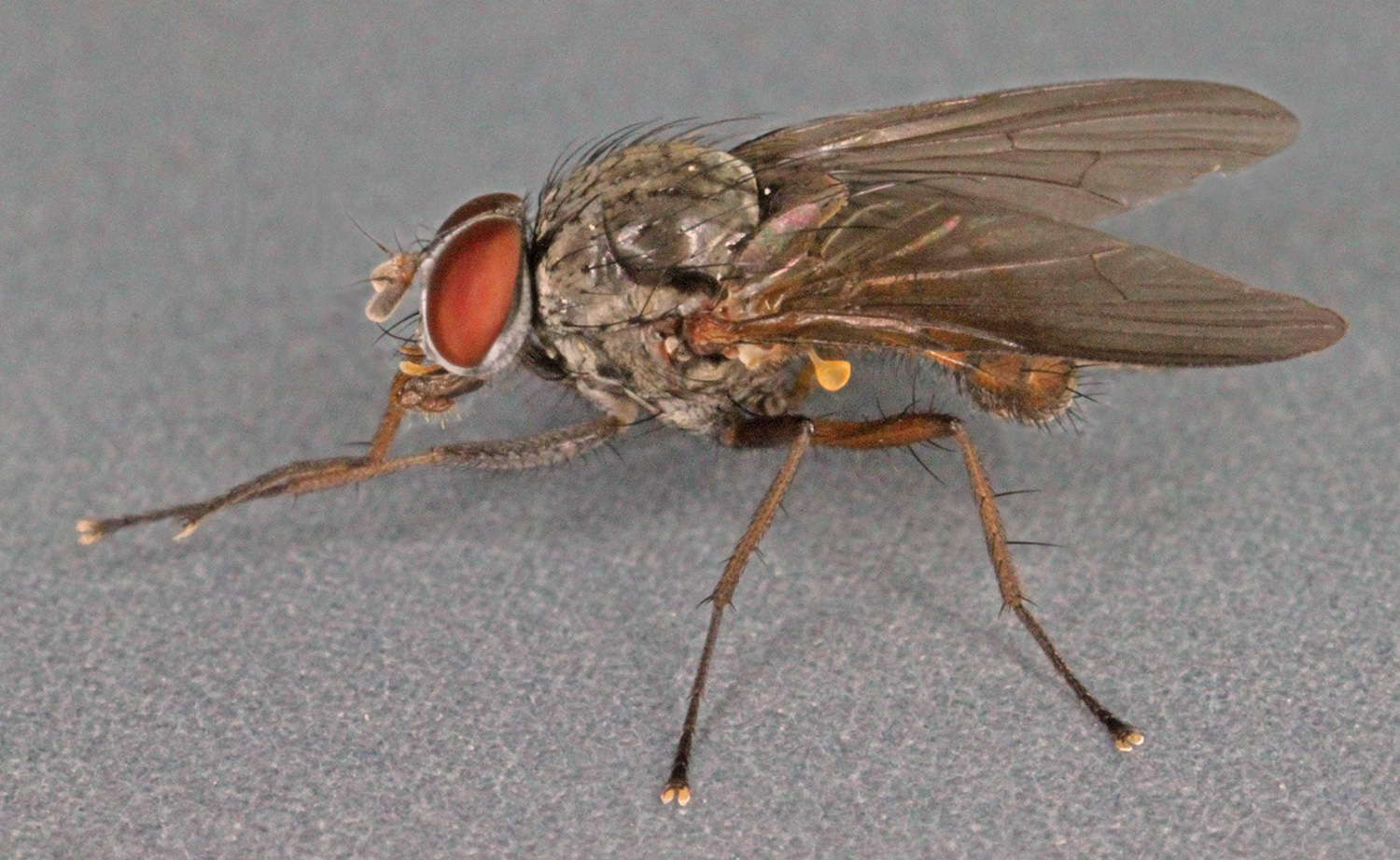

Scientific classification
- Kingdom: Animalia
- Phylum: Arthropoda
- Class: Insecta
- Order: Diptera
- Family: Anthomyiidae
- Genus: Pegomya
- Species: P. winthemi

Binomial name
- Pegomya winthemi (Meigen, 1826)

Synonyms
- Anthomyia winthemi Meigen, 1826; Anthomyza latitarsis Zetterstedt, 1846; Pegomyia fuscofasciata Malloch, 1920

= Pegomya winthemi =

Species of fly

Pegomya winthemi is a species of fly in the family Anthomyiidae. Found in North America, it was first described as Anthomyia winthemi in 1829 by Johann Wilhelm Meigen. The insect measures 4.25–5 mm long. Its pedipalps are infuscated (darkened with a brownish tinge) apically; the anterior lateral angles of the thorax and scutellum are yellowish red. The longest hairs of the arista are a little longer than its basal diameter, while the lower calyptra (small membranes above the halteres) are distinctly protruded. The scutellum is almost bare on the disc. The posthumeral bristle is not duplicated, and the area between the posthumeral and the margin of thorax is almost bare.
