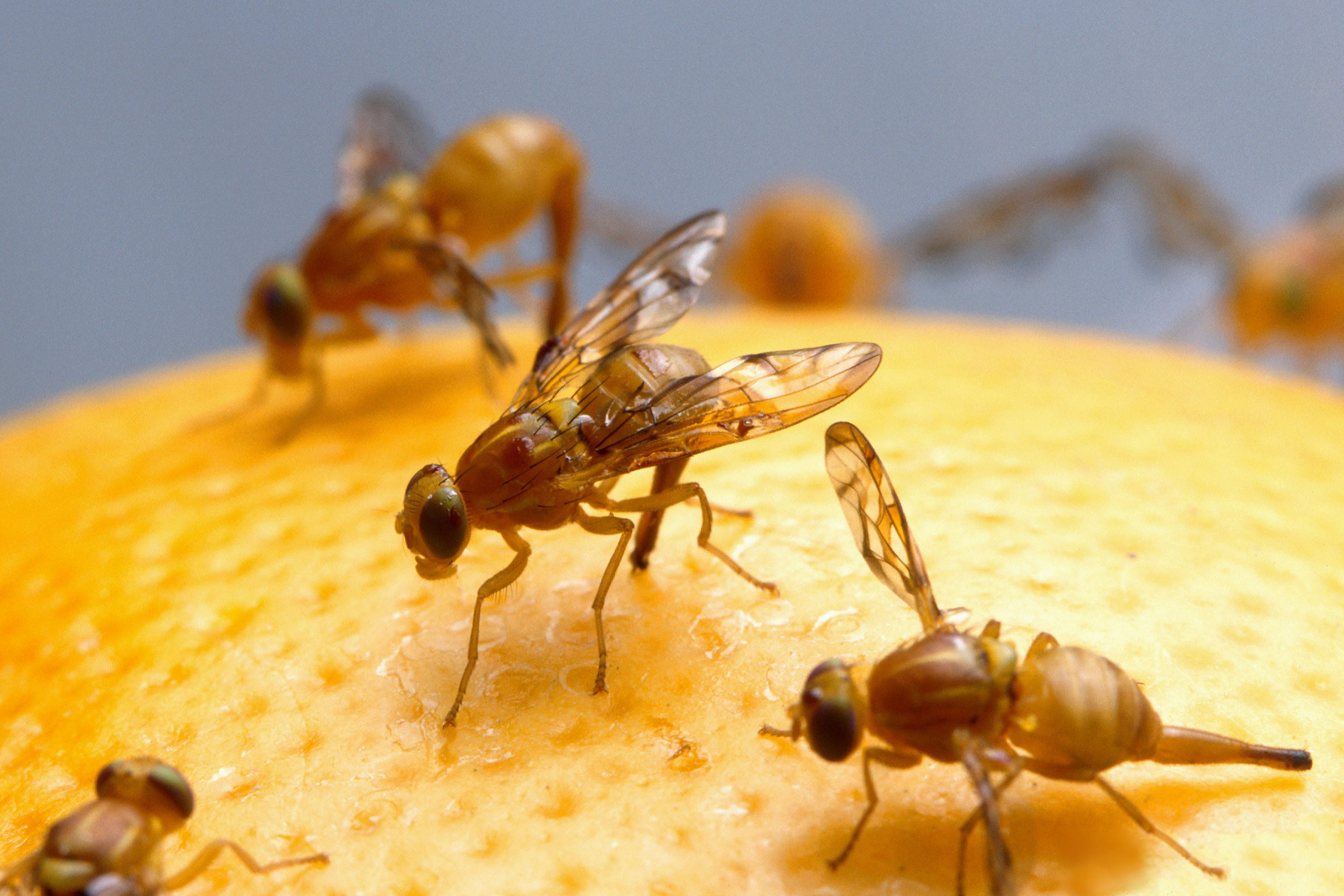
- Anastrepha ludens on their preferred orange fruit habitat. The bottom right fly is a female as identified by long ovipositor. The fly in the middle of image is male.

Scientific classification
- Kingdom: Animalia
- Phylum: Arthropoda
- Class: Insecta
- Order: Diptera
- Family: Tephritidae
- Genus: Anastrepha
- Species: A. ludens

Binomial name
- Anastrepha ludens Loew, 1873

Synonyms
- Acrotoxa ludens; Anastrepha lathana; Trypeta ludens

= Anastrepha ludens =

Species of fly

Anastrepha ludens, the Mexican fruit fly or Mexfly, is a species of fly of the Anastrepha genus in the Tephritidae family (fruit flies). It is closely related to the Caribbean fruit fly Anastrepha suspensa, and the papaya fruit fly Anastrepha curvicauda.

Anastrepha ludens is native to Mexico and Central America and is a major pest to citrus and mango agriculture in Mexico, Central America, and the lower Rio Grande Valley. The species exhibits high fecundity and relatively long lifespans compared to other species of fruit flies. These qualities make the Mexican fruit fly a particularly aggressive invasive species, especially threatening agriculture because the larvae grow and feed on many different species of fruit. The Anastrepha genus is designated as one of three genera that pose the greatest risk to American agriculture. According to the USDA, A. ludens is the only important member of the Anastrepha genus that is subtropical instead of tropical and thus has a range much further North than most Anastrepha species. Also the USDA estimates that the Mexfly causes $1.44 billion worth of damage in a 5-year time span, mostly to citrus farms. They are frequently designated as an invasive species in Southern California and Arizona and pose a serious threat to Florida's grapefruit agriculture.

== Description ==
=== Adults ===
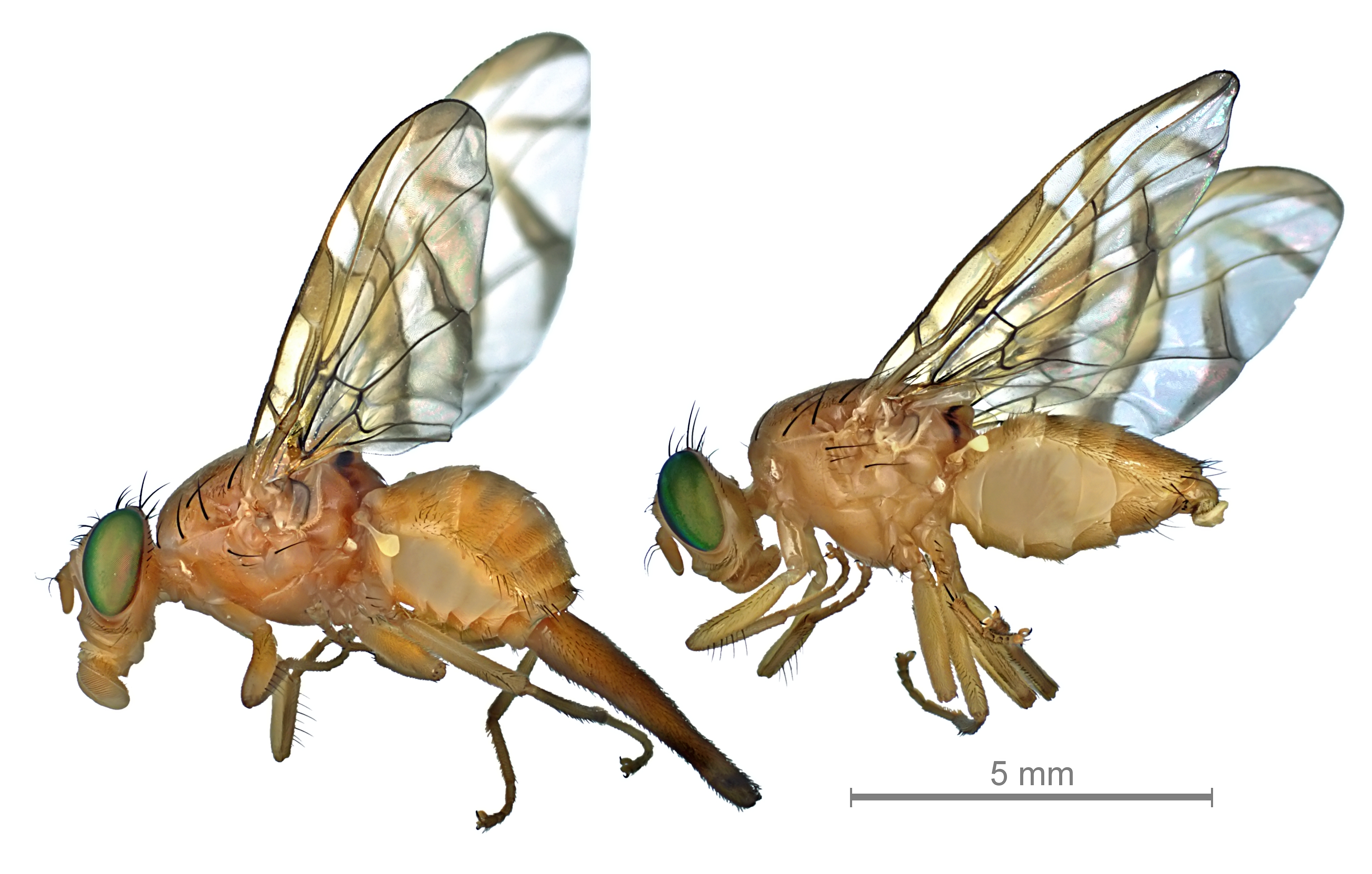
Left: Female A. ludens. Right: male A. ludens.

Most species in the Anastrepha genus including A. ludens have a distinctive yellow and brown coloration of the body and wings. The adult A. ludens is 7–11 mm long, or slightly larger than a common house fly. They have a mesonotum that is 2.75-3.6 mm long and a wing span of 6.6-9.0 mm.

Females have a relatively long life spans of up to 11 months. Males live even longer than females, up to 16 months. Female adult A. ludens have a long ovipositor (3.35-4.7mm) and sheath relative to body size and are capable of laying more than 1,500 eggs in their lifetimes, making A. ludens highly fecund.

Anastrepha ludens have 12 chromosomes and most cells are diploid. A 2014 genetic study of A. ludens concluded that "A. ludens populations are genetically diverse with moderate levels of differentiation." They go on to attribute this genetic diversity to natural selection across the wide habitat range of the fly and to pest management practices. In addition they found high levels of inbreeding in the species.

Gut bacteria exist in A. ludens called Enterobacteriaceae (fruit fly type bacteria). Other families of bacteria have been found in Mexican fruit flies including Vibrionaceae, Bacillaceae, Micrococcaceae, and Pseudomonadaceae. The effects of these bacteria on A. ludens are not well studied but it has been proposed by M. Aluja that A. ludens regurgitate internal bacteria onto their host and use the bacterial colonies as a protein source. The gut bacteria may also play a role in digestion and detoxification of chemicals.

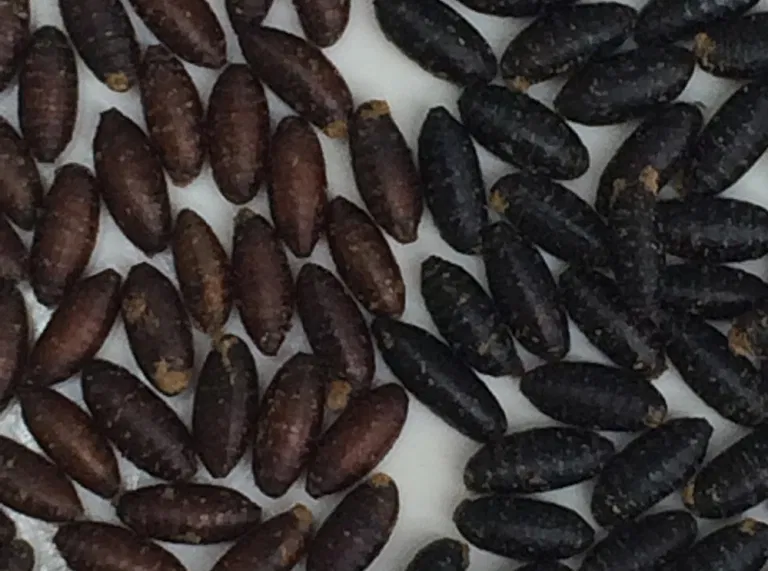
Anastrepha ludens pupae

=== Larvae ===
Larvae have an elongated cylindrical shape typical of fruit flies and are white in color. Larvae can be up to 12 mm in length. Larvae usually pupate on the ground but have also been observed to occasionally pupate inside its host fruit. Larvae determine when to exit a fruit through physical and chemical signals such as the pH of the rotting fruit and the drop of the fruit from to the ground.

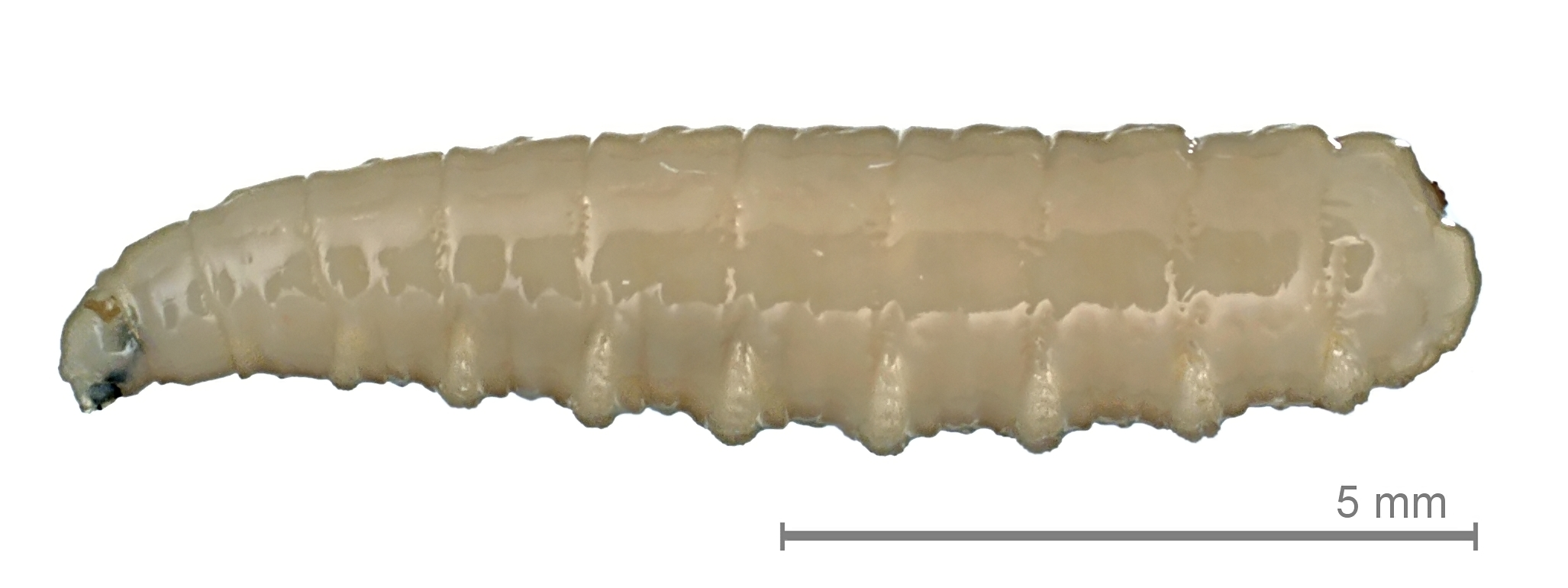
Larva of Anastrepha ludens

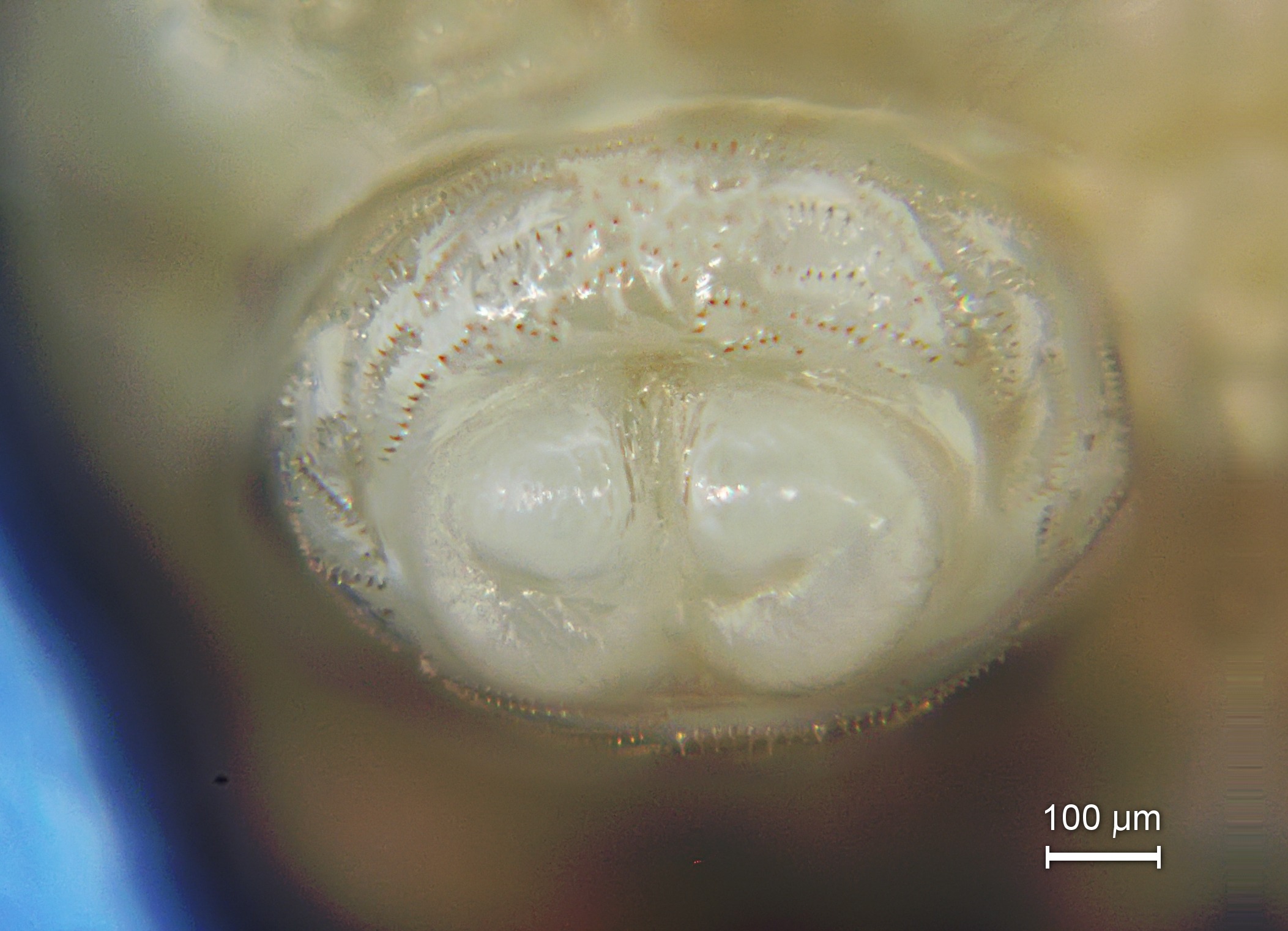
Anterior spiracle of a larval Anastrepha ludens

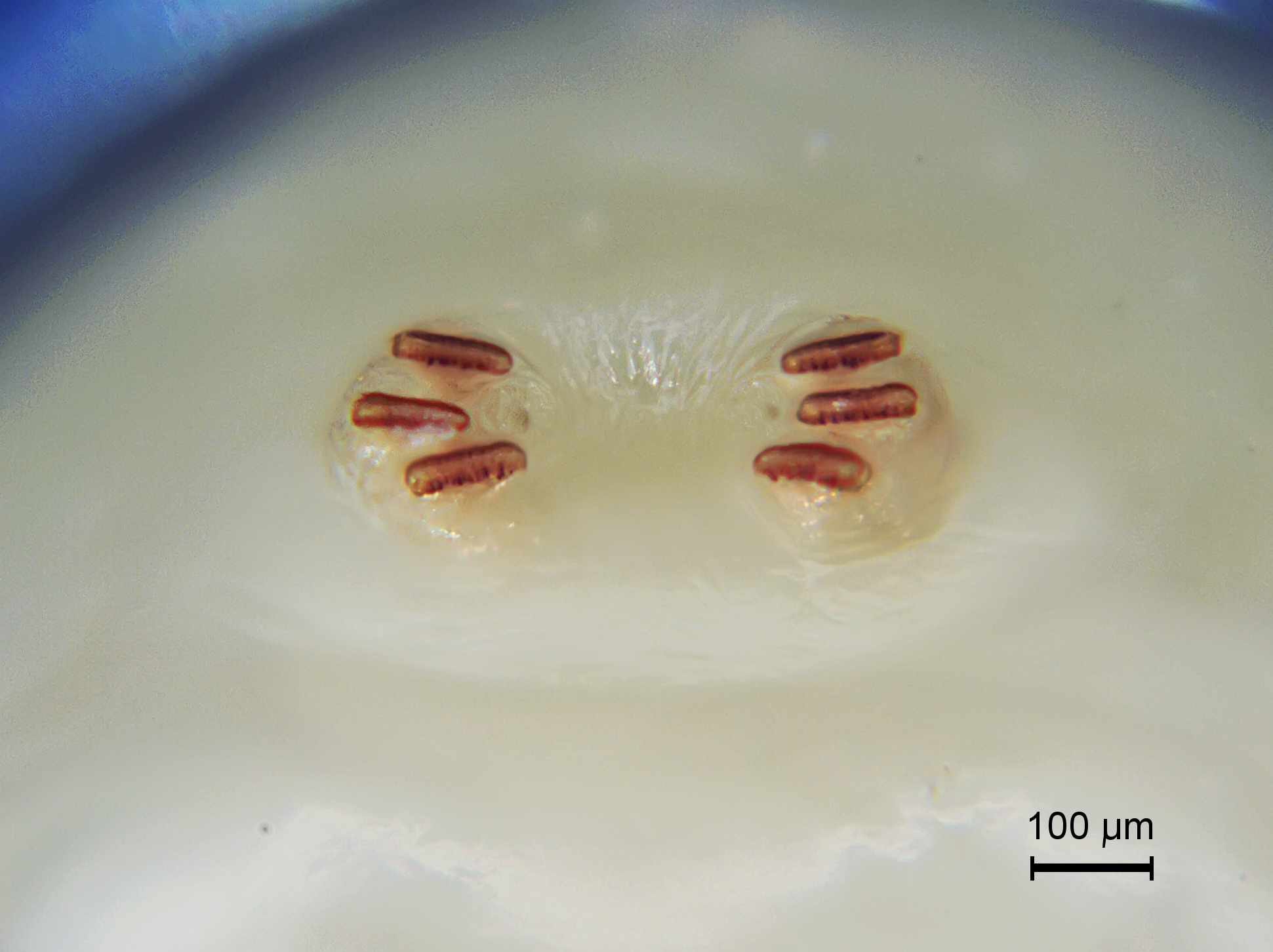
Anastrepha ludens larva posterior spiracle

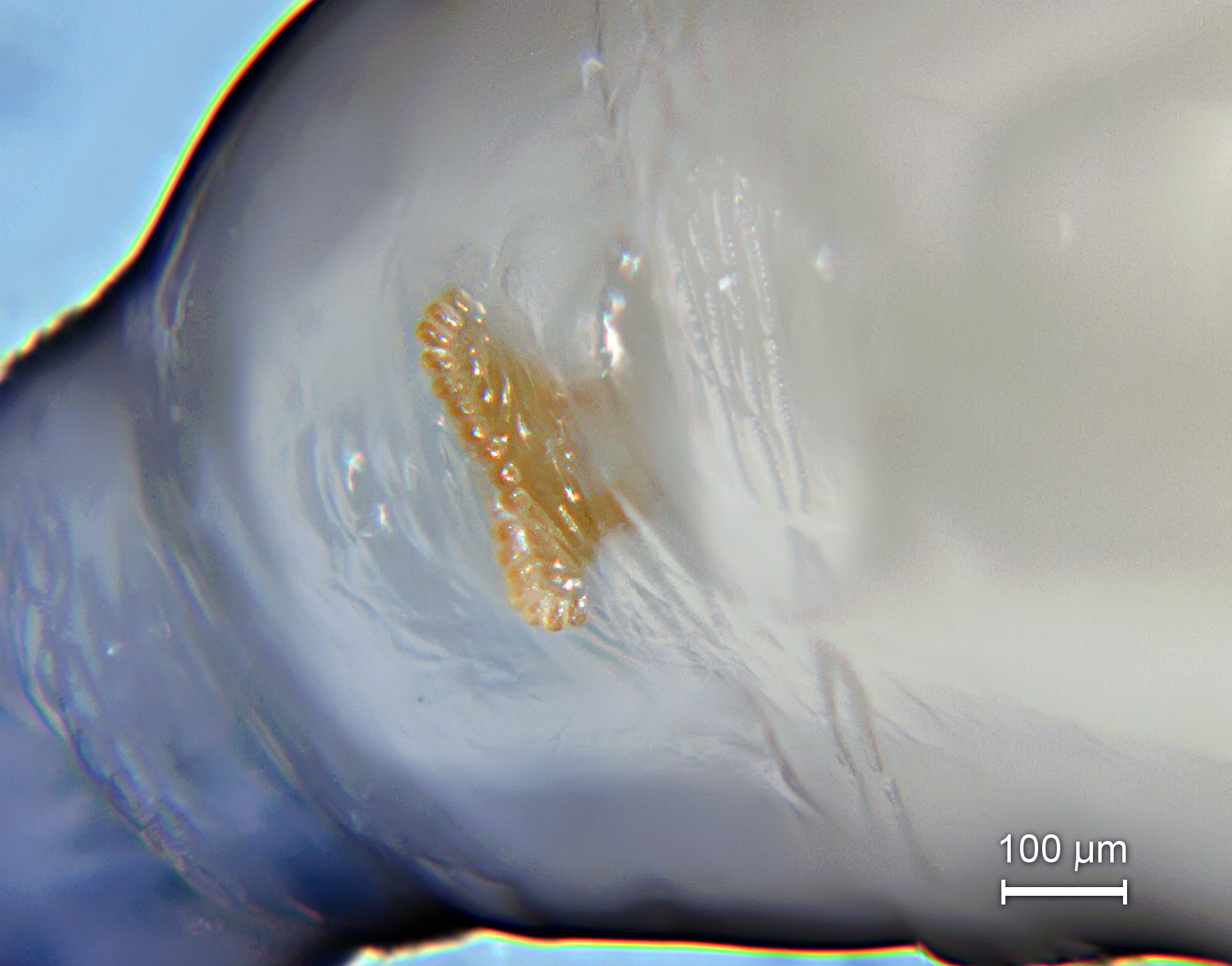
Anastrepha ludens larva anterior spiracle

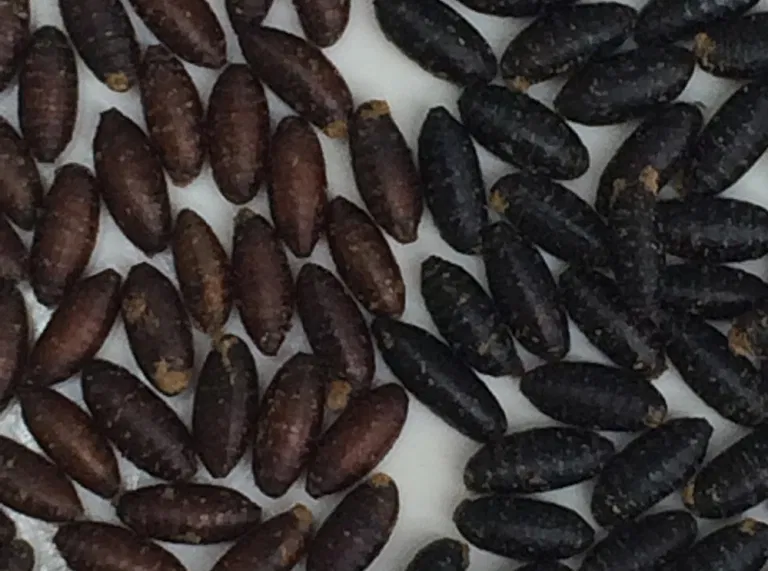
Anastrepha ludens pupa

=== Distribution ===
Anastrepha ludens is native to Guatemala, Mexico and possibly Costa Rica. It is an invasive species to the US. The first record of these flies spotted outside of their native habitat of Mexico and Central America was in a small Texas colony in 1903. By 1927, Mexican fruit flies were infecting citrus farms in lower Rio Grande Valley of Southern Texas and threatening farmland in California, Texas, Florida, and Arizona. In 1954, the fly species had spread westward as far as Hermosillo. The flies were rare in Costa Rica until the 1990s when they suddenly appeared on citrus plants. It is unclear if the species was native to Costa Rica or migrated there from the north. It was previously believed that the species is native to Colombia because of misidentification of A. manizaliensis but it is now known that the species does not exist there.

The US Department of Agriculture presumes that these flies were introduced to the USA through the import of larvae infested fruits.

Currently, California, Arizona, Florida and most of northern Mexico are considered free of Mexican fruit flies and eradication efforts are taking place in Texas, with some Texas quarantine areas having been successfully cleared and the quarantines lifted. The eradication of these flies from most of the US and Northern Mexico is largely due to the successful implementation of the sterile insect technique (SIT). SIT is currently used in parts of Texas to control the species population.

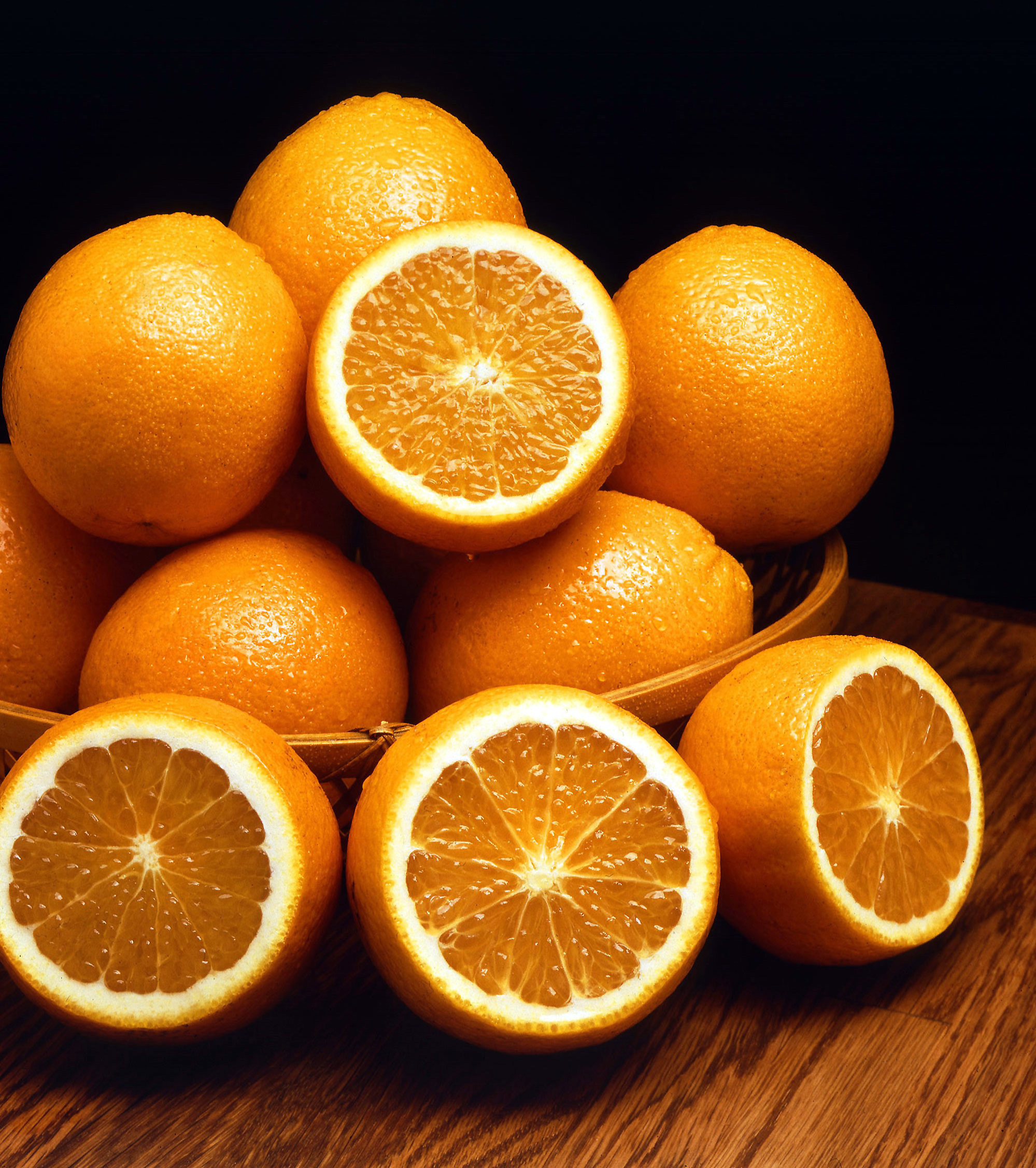
Oranges

=== Habitat ===
The Mexican fruit fly prefers living near citrus and other fruits, which act as hosts where the female can lay her eggs. Anastrepha suspensa prey on many of the same fruits in the same regions where A. ludens primarily reside as well. Anastrepha ludens prefers laying eggs in grapefruits and oranges, but many other hosts have been recorded including:

- Anacardium occidentale (cashew)
- Annona cherimola (cherimoya)
- Annona reticulata (custard apple)
- Annona squamosa (sugar-apple)
- Carica papaya (papaya)
- Casimiroa edulis (white sapote)
- Casimiroa tetrameria (matasano)
- Citrus aurantiifolia (lime)
- Citrus maxima (pummelo)
- Citrus aurantium (sour orange)
- Citrus limetta (sweet lime)
- Citrus x paradisi (grapefruit)
- Citrus medica (citron)
- Citrus reticulata (tangerine)
- Citrus sinensis (sweet orange)
- Coffea arabica (arabica coffee)
- Cydonia oblonga (quince)
- Diospyros kaki (Japanese persimmon)
- Feijoa sellowiana (feijoa)
- Inga (shimbillo)
- Malus domestica (apple)
- Malus pumila (paradise apple)
- Mammea americana (mammey apple)
- Mangifera indica (mango)
- Sideroxylon capiri (bully tree)
- Passiflora edulis (purple granadilla)
- Persea americana (avocado)
- Pouteria sapota (sapote)
- Prunus persica (peach)
- Psidium guajava (common guava)
- Psidium littorale (strawberry guava)
- Punica granatum (pomegranate)
- Pyrus communis (pear)
- Sargentia greggii (yellow chapote)
- Spondias purpurea (red mombin)
- Syzygium jambos (rose-apple)

It has been experimentally shown that A. ludens choose oranges and grapefruit over other hosts but in the absence of these fruits will deposit larvae on any of the above hosts.

== Life history ==
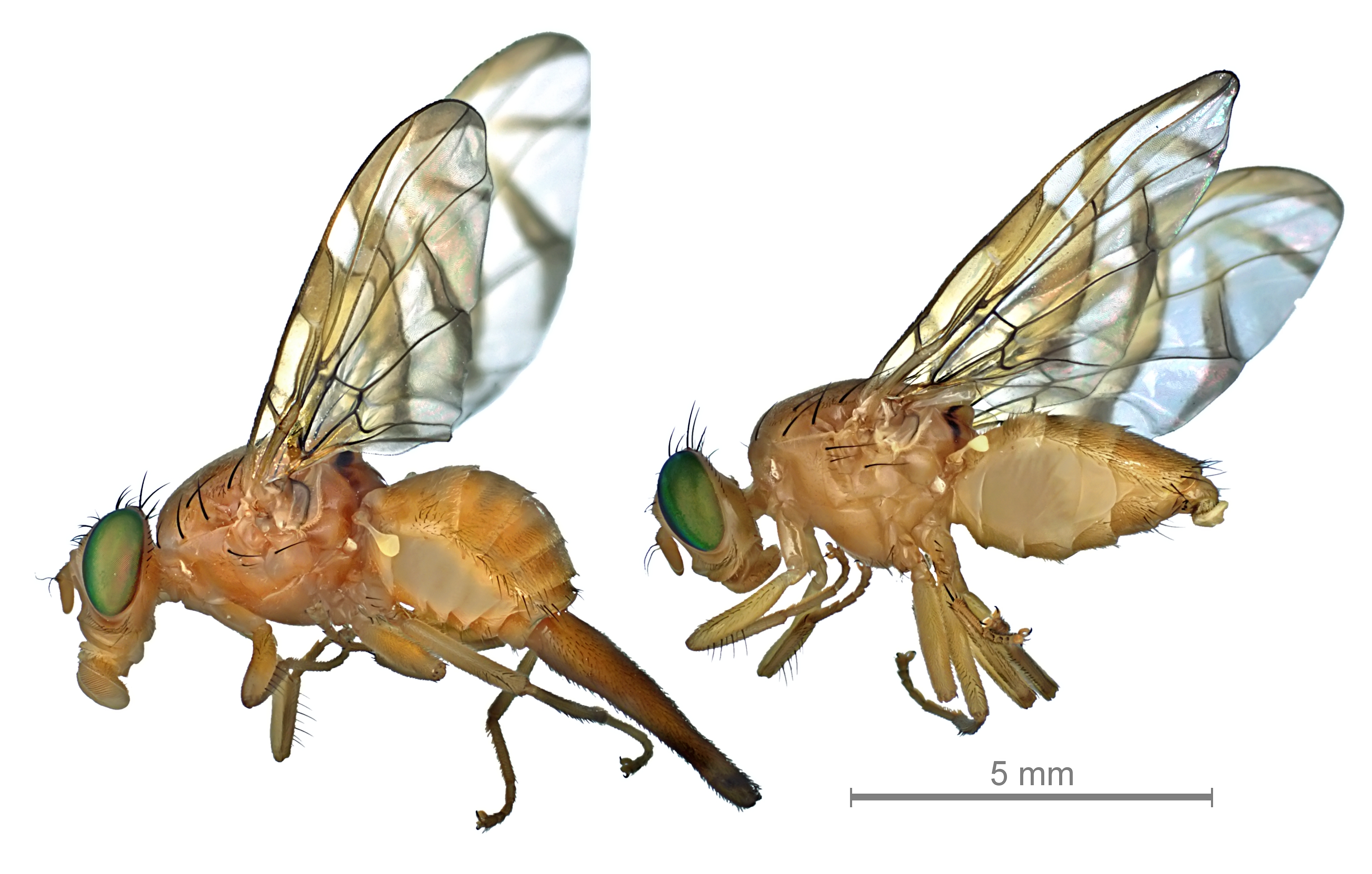
Lateral view of female (left) and male (right) Anastrepha ludens.

While female and male A. ludens can live up to 11 and 16 months respectively under lab conditions, in nature their lifespans tend to be about a year. Females typically lay approximately 25-70 eggs a day. Their relatively long life span allows females to have a gross reproduction rate of up to 1600 offspring. They prefer to lay their eggs on citrus fruits, typically grapefruits or oranges, when the fruits start to ripen and develop in color.

The Mexican fruit fly goes through four stages of development (holometabolism or complete metamorphosis): egg, larvae, pupa, adult. The rate at which they mature is directly related to ambient environmental factors such as temperature and humidity.

The life cycle begins when the adult female lays her eggs. The female fly deposits eggs via her ovipositor into the fruit host. The eggs hatch 6–10 days later and then enter their second stage of development, the larval stage.

The larval stage lasts for 3–4 weeks, depending on the temperature and other conditions. While inside the fruit, the larvae continue to grow and develop through 3 larval instars. When they have reached optimal size and environmental conditions are right, the mature larvae emerge from the fruit into the soil and begin to pupate. Larvae eat and burrow into the fruit that their mother laid them on. While grapefruits and oranges are preferred, other citrus fruits, pears, apples, and peach are also common hosts and thus food sources. Like other fruit flies, A. ludens need to consume a mixture of amino acids, minerals, carbohydrates, water, and vitamins in order to survive. Adult flies can get their nutrients from raindrops and bird feces, while larvae get all their resources from their host fruit.

=== Adult ===
The adult fly emerges from the pupal casing and the life cycle begins anew. The new fly finds a dry sheltered spot until it can unfold their wings. There is a period of sexual maturation during which they eat lots of protein which allows for gonadal development. After this period the male is fully sexually active. The female fly can lay over 1500 eggs in its lifetime. These flies are known to be able to go through period of estivation. This ability and their polyphagous nature allows them to be able to survive in poor resource conditions better than other flies as they migrate to find a site with better resources. Anastrepha ludens female reproductive potential has been shown to be affected by male-female contact. An experiment showed that combining females and males together in cages during maturation reduced egg production.

=== Mating and parental care ===
Male A. ludens exhibit lek mating and thus do not provide any care for offspring outside of fertilizing the egg.

Female A. ludens will use olfactory and visual stimulus to find a good oviposition site. They have been observed landing on potential host fruit and walking around while headbutting the fruit. Once the female makes her decision to lay eggs, she will bore into the fruit and deposit eggs. Then she deposits a host-marking pheromone over her eggs. This pheromone seems to stimulate the female fly.

Anastrepha ludens males follow a lek mating strategy in which they provide no parental care for offspring. Males mating strategy involves claiming a territory and defending it from other males through sounds and physical actions. Ideal territories for males are under the leaves of trees that produce citrus fruit. Males deposit their pheromones through their mouth and anus onto the underside of leaves, and they emit an aggressive song by quickly vibrating their wings.

Female A. ludens exhibit mate choice and tend to prefer to mate with larger males. This is thought to be due to larger males singing better mating songs and depositing more sperm into females. The process of a female choosing a mate can take up to 2 hours.

=== Social behavior ===
Larvae will feed on their host fruit for continuous periods of over 24 hours. Larval movement is dictated by the ripeness of the host fruit. After the larvae matures to become an adult, 96% of A. ludens emerge from their burrow hole between 6 a.m. and 10 a.m. Mating calls of adult flies are observed mostly during late afternoons. These behaviors vary between different species of fruit flies.

A. ludens have been observed migrating about 135 km from their breeding site in Mexico to farms in southern Texas. Using release-recapture technique, researchers observed flies moving back and forth between the two habitat areas.

== Ecology ==
=== Predators ===
The main natural enemies of A. ludens are parasitoid wasps, specifically in the families Braconidae and Ichneumonidae. Diachasmimorpha longicaudata, Doryctobracon crawfordi, Ganaspis pelleranoi, Biosteres giffardi, B. vandenboschi, and Aceratoneuromyia indica have been released by the governments of the US, Costa Rica, Mexico, Brazil, Argentina and Peru to biologically control A. ludens and other Anastrepha species populations. D. longicaudata and D. crawfordi have been established as the most efficient at controlling population size for this species of flies.

=== Interaction with humans ===
According to the USDA the species is "one of the world's most destructive invasive pests". In 2018, the Texas citrus industry supported nearly 6,000 jobs and accounted for more than $465 million in statewide revenue.

The USDA utilizes integrated pest management tactics to control the threat of an invasion. The USDA implements a quarantine zone where wild flies are captured in the United States. Movement of citrus fruit is restricted within the quarantined area. The USDA operates an extensive eradication and suppression campaign against the Mexican fruit fly (Mexfly), which includes the use of sterile insect technique. Sterile flies are released by the hundreds of millions to suppress the invasive population. Other tactics deployed by the USDA include the use of preventative pesticide application and biocontrol tactics by releasing parasitoid wasps, which are natural A. ludens predators. There has been at least one Mexfly quarantine in Texas on an annual basis for over 80 years. The Texas Department of Agracalture (TDA) advises anyone with citrus trees to pick fruits before they fall to the ground to help prevent the spread of the species.

As of July 2021, there is an active A. ludens quarantine zones in the Texas. In March 2026, The California Department of Food and Agriculture (CDFA) declared a quarantine in areas of San Diego County after Mexican fruit flies were found during a routine inspection in the city of La Mesa. Mexican fruit fly infestations have been detected and eradicated several times before in the state of California.
