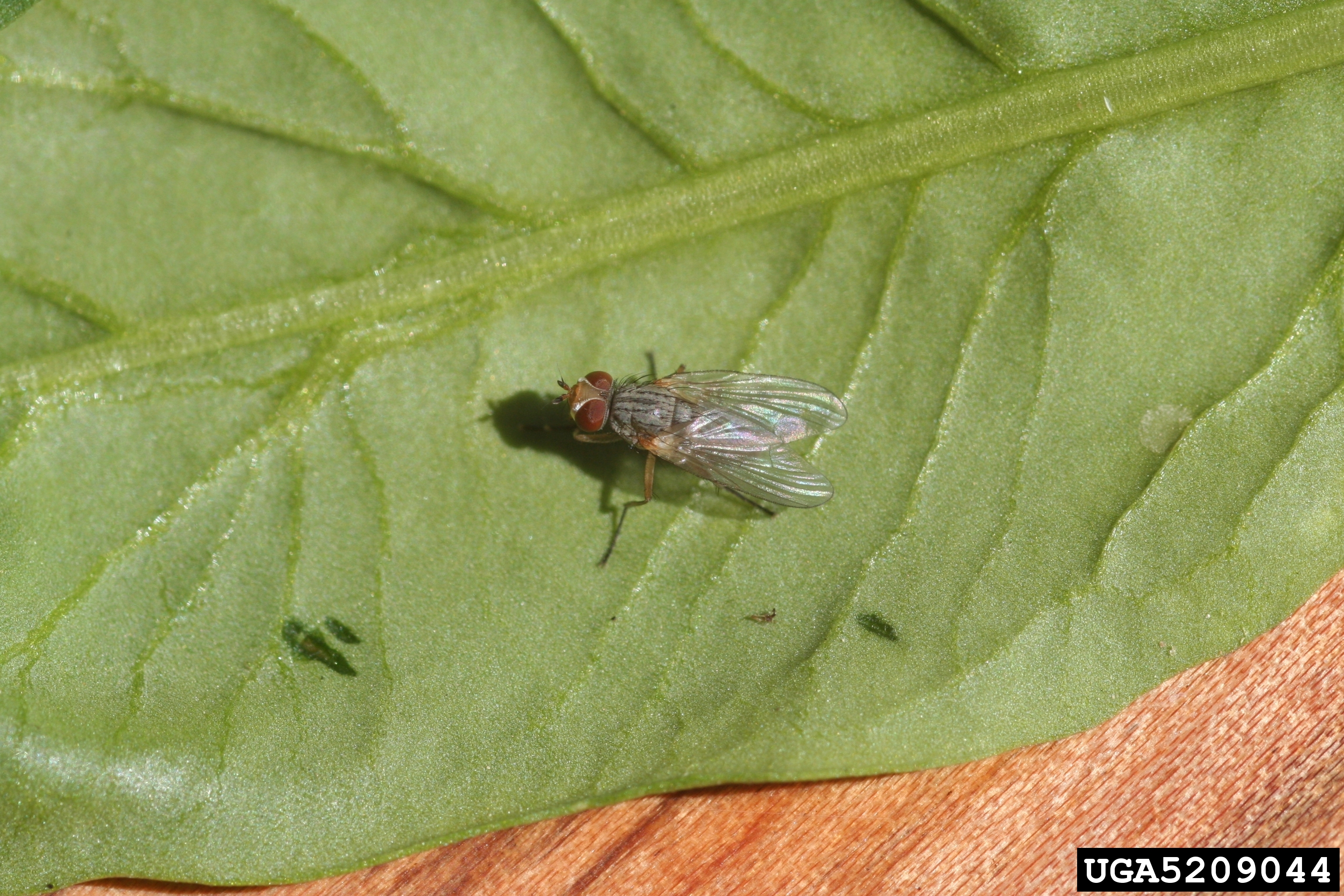

Scientific classification
- Kingdom: Animalia
- Phylum: Arthropoda
- Clade: Pancrustacea
- Class: Insecta
- Order: Diptera
- Family: Anthomyiidae
- Genus: Pegomya
- Species: P. hyoscyami

Binomial name
- Pegomya hyoscyami (Panzer, 1809)

Synonyms
- Anthomyia hyoscyami Panzer, 1809; Chortophila chenopodii Rondani, 1866; Pegomya chenopodii (Rondani, 1866)

= Pegomya hyoscyami =

Species of fly

Pegomya hyoscyami, the beet leafminer or spinach leafminer, is a grey fly about 6 millimetres (0.24 in) long. It emerges in April–May and lays eggs on the undersides of leaves of beet, spinach, chard, and other greens. Eggs develop into larvae that burrow into the leaf hollowing out large patches of the leaf between leaf surfaces, often killing large parts of the leaf.

Two to five white cylindrical eggs are laid on the underside of the leaf and hatch four to six days later. The larvae burrow into the leaf creating a thin trail at first and eventually a blotch or "blister." The larvae are mature seven to sixteen days later and drop into the ground where they pupate. Larvae may move from leaf to leaf before entering the soil. Larvae may also pupate in the leaf itself. The adult fly emerges in two to four weeks and repeats the cycle, creating several generations each year.

Control is cultural, creating a barrier by using floating row covers or removing infestations as soon as they appear and destroying the damaged leaves off site. Yellow sticky traps may be used to trap adults. Pesticides are ineffective as the vulnerable stage, the maggots, are protected inside the leaf.

== Gallery ==
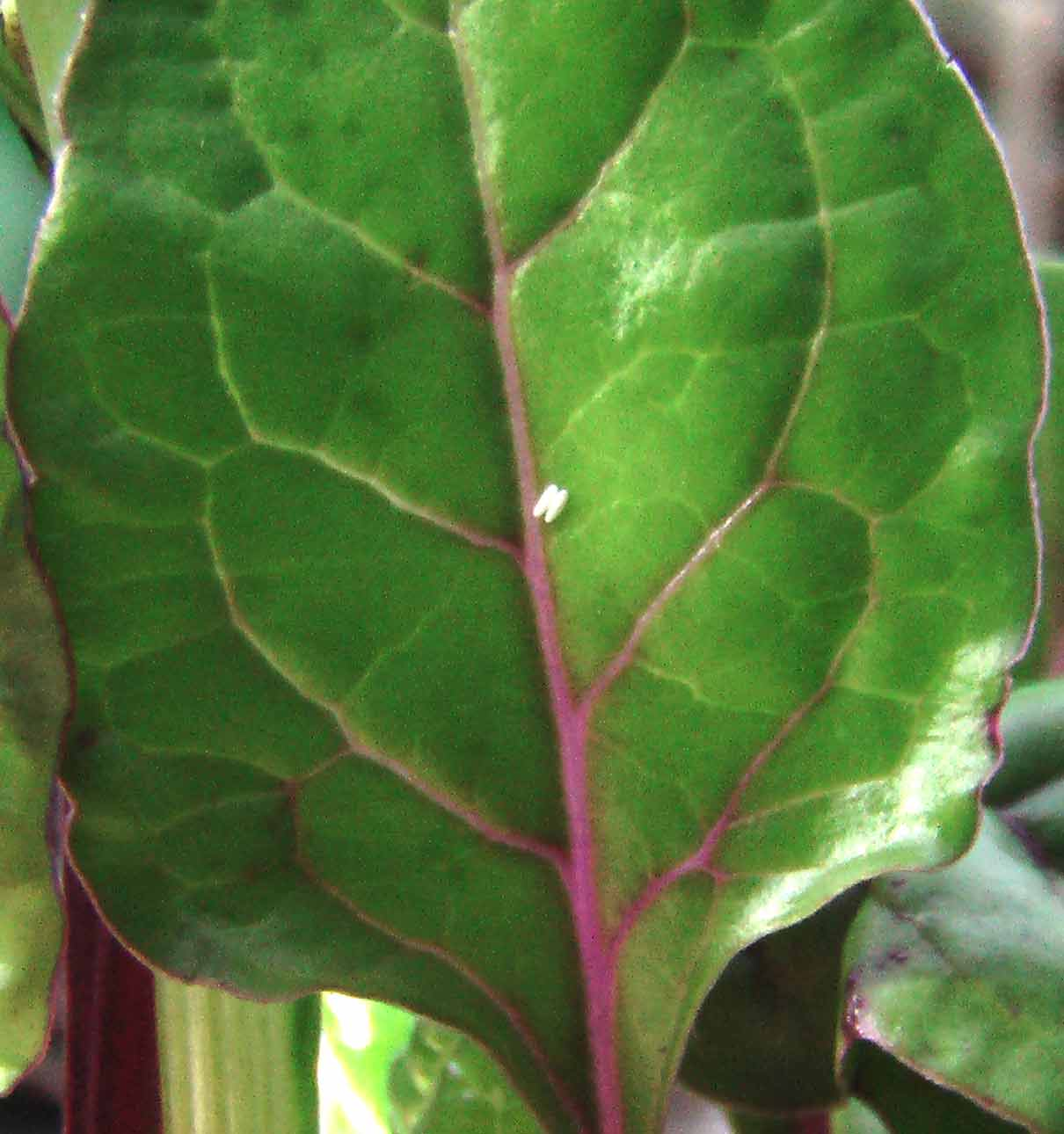
Two eggs laid on underside of chard leaf

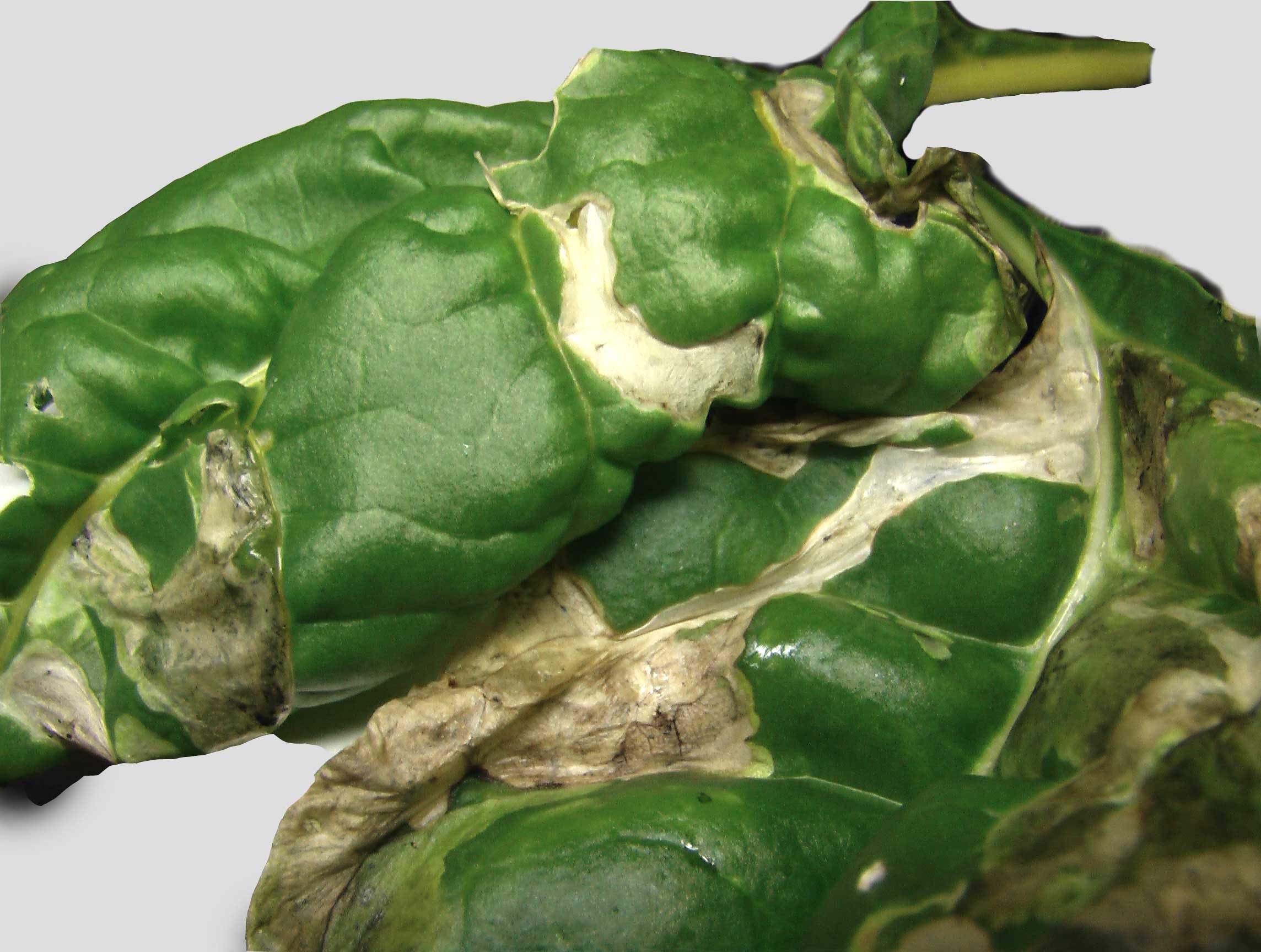
"Blisters" made by leaf miner

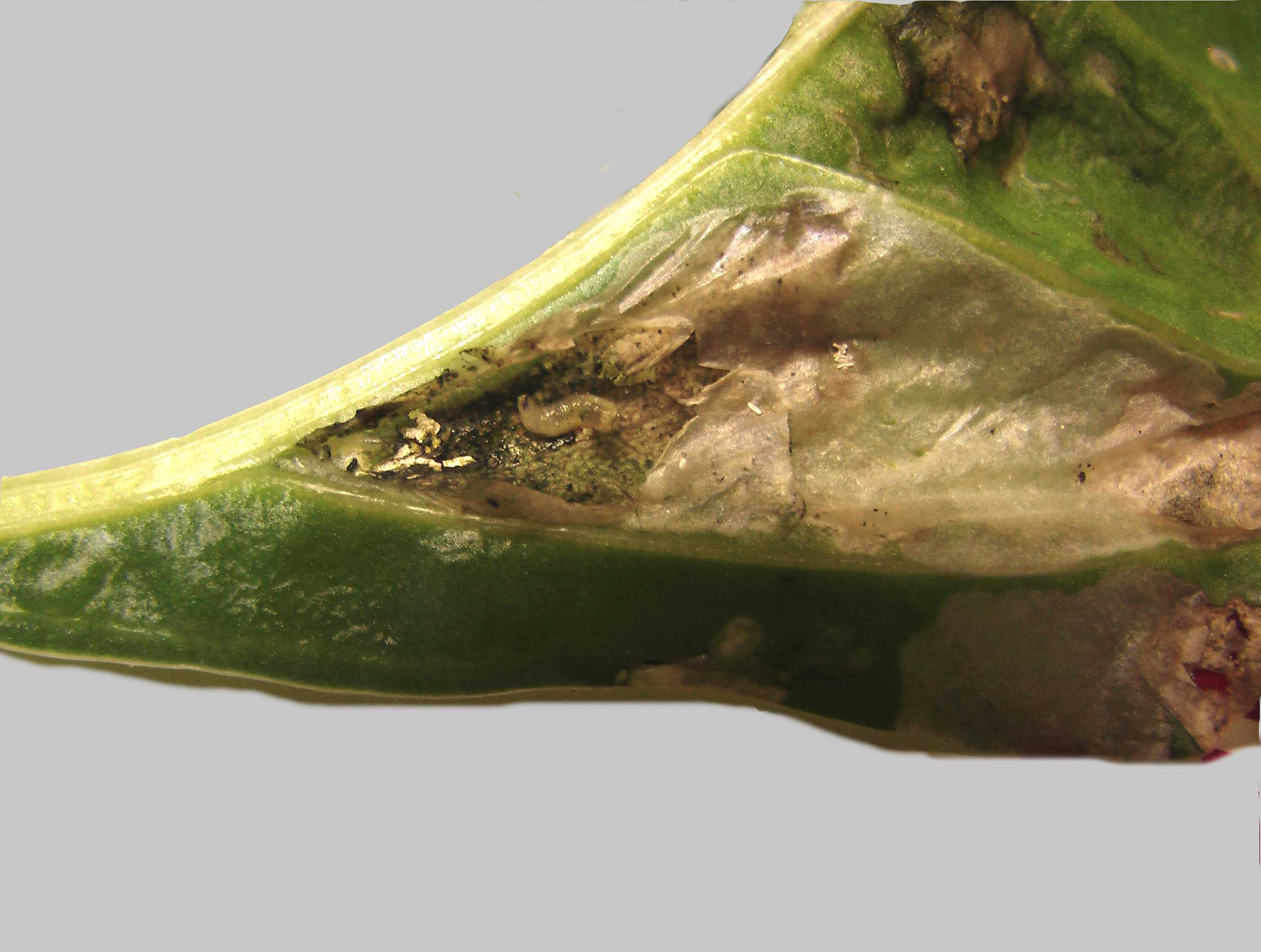
Larva exposed by peeled back blister
