= Pegomya carduorum =

Scientific classification
- Domain: Eukaryota
- Kingdom: Animalia
- Phylum: Arthropoda
- Class: Insecta
- Order: Diptera
- Family: Anthomyiidae
- Genus: Pegomya
- Species: P. carduorum

Binomial name
- Pegomya carduorum Rehm, 1872

Species of fly

Pegomya carduorum is a species of root-maggot flies (insects in the family Anthomyiidae).
