= Pegomya pseudobicolor =

Scientific classification
- Domain: Eukaryota
- Kingdom: Animalia
- Phylum: Arthropoda
- Class: Insecta
- Order: Diptera
- Family: Anthomyiidae
- Genus: Pegomya
- Species: P. pseudobicolor

Binomial name
- Pegomya pseudobicolor Griffiths, 1982

Species of fly

Pegomya pseudobicolor is a species of root-maggot fly (insects in the family Anthomyiidae).
