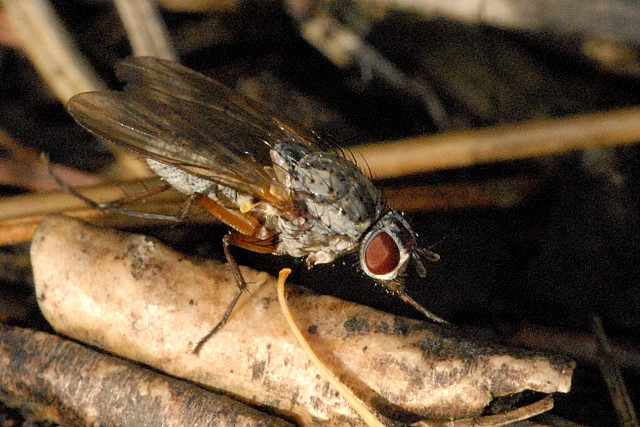
- female P. testacea

Scientific classification
- Domain: Eukaryota
- Kingdom: Animalia
- Phylum: Arthropoda
- Class: Insecta
- Order: Diptera
- Family: Anthomyiidae
- Tribe: Pegomyini
- Genus: Pegomya; Robineau-Desvoidy 1830

Type species
- Anthomyia hyoscyami Panzer 1809

Synonyms
- Chlorina Robineau-Desvoidy 1830; Pegomyia Macquart ,1835; Phoraea Robineau-Desvoidy 1830; Phyllis Robineau-Desvoidy 1830; Zabia Robineau-Desvoidy 1830; Carduophila Hendel, 1925; Chaetopegomya Ringdahl, 1938

= Pegomya =

Genus of flies

Female Pegomya testacea on grass in a meadow

Pegomya is a genus of flies within the family Anthomyiidae. Some species are considered pests due to their leafmining larvae. Species include:

- P. agarici Griffiths, 1984
- P. aldrichi Griffiths, 1983
- P. alticola (Huckett, 1939)
- P. amargosana Griffiths, 1982
- P. aninotata (Huckett, 1939)
- P. atlanis (Huckett, 1939)
- P. betae (Curtis, 1847) — beet leafminer
- P. bicolor (Wiedemann, 1817)
- P. bifurcata Griffiths, 1983
- P. caesia (Stein, 1906)
- P. calyptrata (Zetterstedt, 1846)
- P. carduorum (Huckett, 1939)
- P. cedrica (Huckett, 1939)
- P. circumpolaris Ackland and Griffiths, 1983
- P. cognata (Stein, 1920)
- P. collomiae Griffiths, 1982
- P. constricta Griffiths, 1982
- P. convergens (Huckett, 1939)
- P. crassiforceps Griffiths, 1983
- P. cygnicollina Griffiths, 1971
- P. defecta Huckett, 1966
- P. depressiventris (Zetterstedt, 1845)
- P. dissidens Huckett, 1966
- P. disticha Griffiths, 1983
- P. dorsimaculata (Wulp, 1896)
- P. elongata (Wulp, 1896)
- P. flaviantennata Griffiths, 1984
- P. flavifrons (Walker, 1849)
- P. flaviventris Griffiths, 1983
- P. flavoscutellata (Zetterstedt, 1838)
- P. fumipennis (Huckett, 1939)
- P. furva (Ringdahl, 1938)
- P. geniculata (Bouche, 1834)
- P. gilva Zetterstedt, 1846
- P. gilvoides Griffiths, 1983
- P. glabra (Stein, 1920)
- P. haemorrhoum (Zetterstedt, 1938)
- P. hirticauda Huckett, 1966
- P. holmgreni (Boheman, 1858)
- P. holosteae (Hering, 1924)
- P. hyoscyami (Panzer, 1809) — spinach leafminer
- P. icterica (Holmgren, 1872)
- P. incisiva (Stein, 1906)
- P. indicta (Huckett, 1939)
- P. kodiakana Huckett, 1965
- P. macalpinei Griffiths, 1983
- P. macrophthalma Griffiths, 1984
- P. maculata (Stein, 1906)
- P. magdalenensis Griffiths, 1982
- P. minuta (Malloch, 1918)
- P. nagendrai Suwa, 1983
- P. neomexicana Griffiths, 1983
- P. nigra Suwa, 1974
- P. notabilis (Zetterstedt, 1846)
- P. pallidoscutellata (Zetterstedt, 1852)
- P. petasitae Griffiths, 1982
- P. pribilofensis Huckett, 1965
- P. pseudobicolor Griffiths, 1982
- P. quadralis Huckett, 1965
- P. remissa Huckett, 1965
- P. rubivora (Coquillett, 1879) — raspberry cane maggot
- P. rubrivaria Huckett, 1967
- P. rufescens (Stein, 1898)
- P. ruficeps (Zetterstedt, 1838)
- P. rufina (Fallén, 1825)
- P. rugulosa (Zetterstedt, 1845)
- P. sagehenensis Huckett, 1967
- P. saximontana Griffiths, 1983
- P. scapularis (Zetterstedt, 1846)
- P. setaria (Meigen, 1826)
- P. setibasis Huckett, 1965
- P. sharmaii Suwa, 1983
- P. silvicola Huckett, 1966
- P. simplex Griffiths, 1982
- P. sociella (Stein, 1906)
- P. sombrina Huckett, 1966
- P. stagnalis Griffiths, 1982
- P. striata (Stein, 1920)
- P. tabida (Meigen, 1826)
- P. tenera (Zetterstedt, 1838)
- P. terminalis (Rondani, 1866)
- P. tinctisquama (Huckett, 1939)
- P. transgressa (Zetterstedt, 1846)
- P. umbripennis Huckett, 1966
- P. unicolor (Stein, 1898)
- P. utahensis Griffiths, 1982
- P. valgenovensis Hennig, 1973
- P. variegata (Huckett, 1939)
- P. ventralis (Stein, 1906)
- P. versicolor (Meigen, 1826)
- P. vicaria (Huckett, 1939)
- P. vittigera (Zetterstedt, 1838)
- P. winthemi (Meigen, 1826)
- P. wygodzinskyi (Albuquerque, 1954)
- P. zonata (Zetterstedt, 1838)
