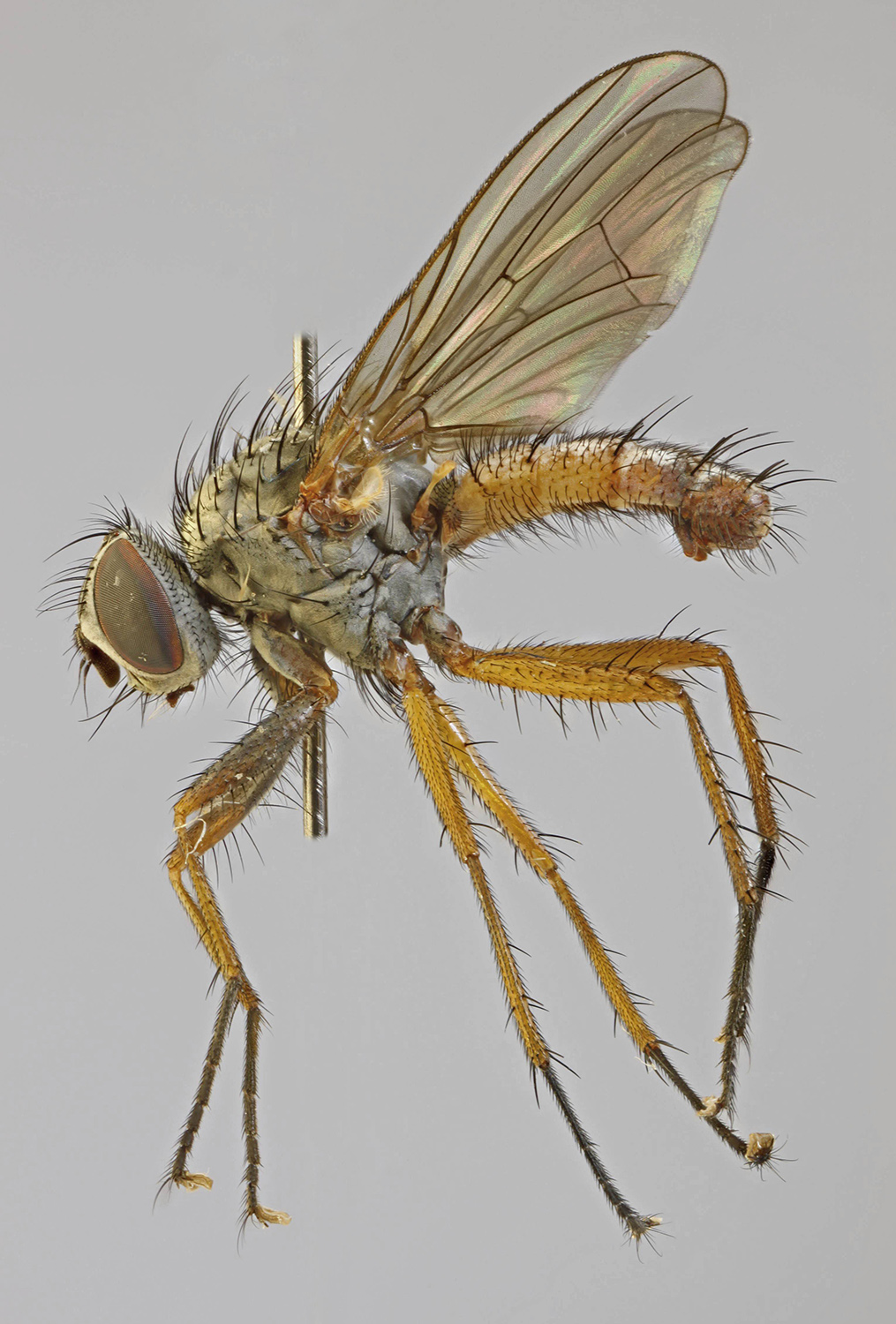
- Pegomya bicolor North Wales.

Scientific classification
- Kingdom: Animalia
- Phylum: Arthropoda
- Class: Insecta
- Order: Diptera
- Family: Anthomyiidae
- Genus: Pegomya
- Species: P. bicolor

Binomial name
- Pegomya bicolor (Wiedemann, 1817)

= Pegomya bicolor =

Species of fly

Pegomya bicolor is a species of fly in the family Anthomyiidae. It is found in the Palearctic. For identification see Host plants include Persicaria virginiana, Rumex acetosa, Rumex acetosella, Rumex conglomeratus, Rumex crispus, and Rumex obtusifolius.
