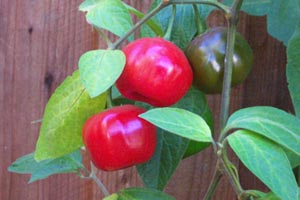

Scientific classification
- Kingdom: Plantae
- Clade: Tracheophytes
- Clade: Angiosperms
- Clade: Eudicots
- Clade: Asterids
- Order: Solanales
- Family: Solanaceae
- Genus: Capsicum
- Species: C. pubescens

Binomial name
- Capsicum pubescens Ruiz & Pav.

Synonyms
- Brachistus lanceifolius Miers; Capsicum annuum var. violaceum Voss; Capsicum lanceifolium (Miers) Kuntze

= Capsicum pubescens =

Species of flowering plant in the nightshade family

Rocoto pepper
- Heat: Low to Very hot
- Scoville scale: 2,400- 250,000 SHU

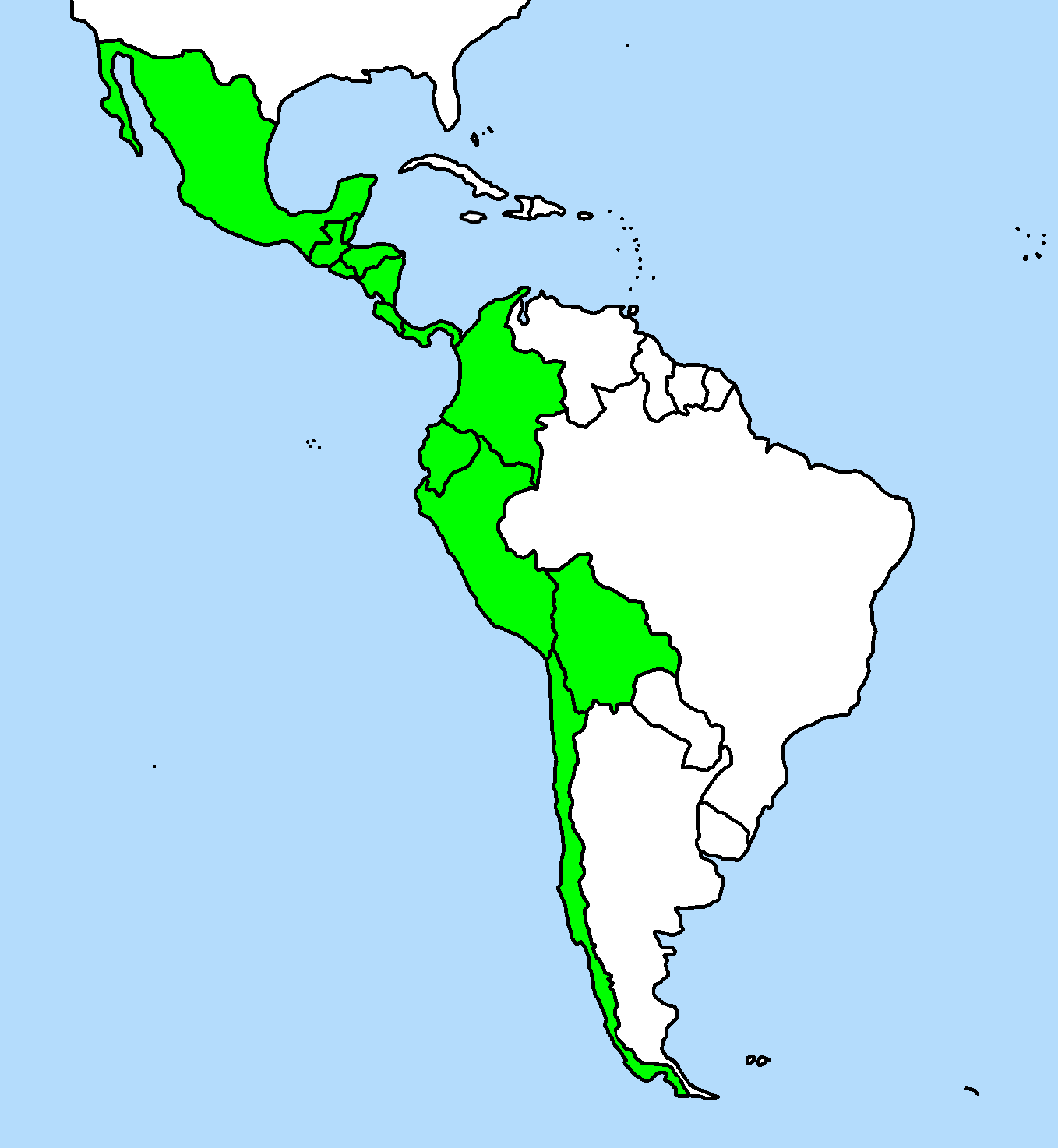
Countries in which C. pubescens is grown

Capsicum pubescens is a plant of the genus Capsicum (pepper). The species name, pubescens, refers to the hairy leaves of this pepper. The hairiness of the leaves, along with the black seeds, make Capsicum pubescens distinguishable from other Capsicum species. Capsicum pubescens has pungent yellow, orange, red, green or brown fruits.

This species is found primarily in Central and South America, and is known only in cultivation. It is consumed fresh, as a paste, dried, or ground. Of all the domesticated species in the genus Capsicum, it is the least widespread and most genetically distinct. It has no common name in English, and its name in Spanish varies by country: it is called by the indigenous terms rocoto in Peru and Ecuador (from the Quechua rukutu or ruqutu) and locoto in Bolivia and Argentina (from the Aymara luqutu); however, in Mexico the term chile manzano (literally, "appletree pepper") is used due to the visual similarity of the fruit to apples.

== Description ==
=== Vegetative characteristics ===
Like all other species of the genus Capsicum, plants of the species Capsicum pubescens grow as a shrub, but sometimes as climbing plants. They grow into four-meter woody plants relatively quickly, and live up to 15 years, which gives them, especially with age, an almost tree-like appearance. After initial growth, the plant branches at a height of about 30 cm for the first time, and further growth divides into a bushy appearance. More shoots develop from the leaf axils. Some varieties have purple discoloration on the branches, as can be observed in other Capsicum species. The leaves have a 5–12 mm long petiole and a leaf blade ovate to 5–12 cm long, 2.5 to 4 cm wide, tapering at the top and the base is wedge-shaped.

In addition to the relatively long life, Capsicum pubescens differs in many other characteristics from related species.

=== Flowers ===
The flowers appear singly or in pairs (rarely up to four) on the shoots, and the branches are at about 1 cm long flower stems, which extend on the fruit to around 4–5 cm. The calyx has five triangular pointed teeth, which have in the fruit a length of about 1 mm. A characteristic different from other cultivated species of the genus Capsicum is the blue-violet-colored petals, brighter in the centre. The anthers are partly purple, partly white.

=== Phytochemicals ===
==== Capsaicinoids ====
Capsaicinoids (capsaicin) are naturally occurring phytochemicals responsible for the heat in chili peppers. While other chili varieties are dominated with up to 80 % by capsaicin, C. pubescens has an almost equally high concentration of dihydrocapsaicin.

C. pubescens is a domesticated chili pepper that has not been explored extensively for its phytochemicals. While some types of C.pubescens are considered mild, other varieties are some of the hottest peppers. The pungency level varies according to two different studies between 2400-31,000 Scoville scale, 15,000-80,000 Scoville scale and 50,000-250,000 Scoville scale.

C. pubescens is a poor source of carotenoids and has a low amount of ascorbic acid and total polyphenols compared to Capsicum annuum. Furthermore, removing the seeds of this pepper during food processing reduces the total polyphenol content by 50%.

==== Aroma ====
The growing interest for this species is related to its cucumber aroma. The aromatic structure of C.pubescens is different than that of other chili peppers. Four aromas are dominant in the odor profile: green, cucumber, earthy-peas, and paprika or bell pepper, due possibly to the higher amount of sulfur and nitrogen compounds (pyrazine) and cucumber-like aldehydes with a low contribution to esters and ionones. The aromatic differences between C. chinense (a commonly used chili pepper) and C. pubescens is the contribution of several ionone esters and ectocarpene. This explains the exotic, fruity aromatic character of C. chinense, which is presented only in small quantities in C. pubescens.

== Uses ==
=== Food properties ===
The fruits of Capsicum pubescens are a versatile food in South American cuisine. The flesh is thicker than that of other chilis, closer to the consistency and size of bell peppers. The level of spice is comparable to other common known chilis, with 50,000 to 250,000 Scoville Heat Units recorded.

=== Fresh uses ===
The seeds and the white membranes, which contain most of the spice, are cut out. It is advised to wear gloves when handling Capsicum pubescens. To reduce the spiciness the fruits can be boiled. The prepared rocoto chilis are used for a variety of dishes. Rocoto relleno is a popular dish in Arequipa, a city in the Andes of Peru. The hollowed out and boiled rocotos are filled up with a mixture of ground beef, onions, garlic and spices. It is topped off with a piece of cheese and baked in the oven. The fruits of the Capsicum pubescens are also used as additions to other meals. Chili paste is made by mixing the chilis with oil. Chili cream is made by mixing rocoto chilis with fresh cheese. Aji de Huacatay is a green sauce which contains green rocoto chilis and is served typically with potatoes. Additionally, rocotos are used for fresh salsas.

=== Processed uses ===
Due to the thick flesh and the high moisture content, drying of peppers solely with sunlight is not as effective as with other species of Capsicum. A closed drying tunnel can reduce the moisture of 80 kilograms of fresh rocoto to 6.4 kilograms of dried rocoto.

== Origin and distribution ==
Capsicum pubescens is native to Bolivia, Peru and Ecuador, dating to pre-Incan times. Traces of its presence have been found in the Guitarrero Caves. The existence of Capsicum pubescens was documented by ancient Peruvians of the Paracas, Nazca, Moche, and Chimu cultures, through textiles, ceramics, and domestic remains. Capsicum pubescens is likely to belong to the oldest domesticated plants in the Americas, its domestication dating back to 6000 BC. Capsicum pubescens is believed to have evolved from other, more primitive wild Capsicum species occurring in the same area. Of all the domesticated species of peppers, this is the least widespread and genetically furthest away from all others. It is reproductively isolated from other species of the genus Capsicum and forms a distinct genetic lineage. In the early 1900's Capsicum pubescens was introduced to Indonesia where it is now grown along other Capsicum species. The routes of introductions remain unclear, as Capsicum pubescens is found on multiple Indonesian islands. A white flower mutant of Capsicum pubescens is widely distributed in West and Central Java, which differentiates it from the normally purple flowering plants.

Capsicum pubescens is rare outside of Central America, being found in cultivation primarily in Bolivia and Peru where it likely originated. It is commonly cultivated from Mexico to Peru, as well as in Indonesia. The plants are usually grown at small scale in courtyards and family gardens, and only surpluses reach markets.

Given its cold tolerance, Capsicum pubescens grows at higher elevations than other species, and cannot survive the tropical heat in the lowlands. However, Capsicum pubescens is not frost-tolerant and requires a long vegetation period of about 9 months. These climate requirements are the main challenges for introducing it to other locations.

== Cultivation ==
=== Production ===
The Viru and Lambayeque valleys are the main production areas, 1000 km north of the capital of Peru. In the Netherlands, tomatoes, cucumbers and peppers share more than 90% gross area of greenhouse production. Between April and November, C. pubescens is grown in greenhouses in the Netherlands. In the rest of the year, it has limited availability, and is grown in Spain or Italy.

=== Planting ===
C. pubescens is genetically different and unique in Capsicum, as it is the only one to tolerate cooler temperatures. A clear temperature difference during the day (15 °C) and at night (8 °C) is preferred, which is similar to the mountainous regions of Peru and Bolivia. However, frost and high heat cause serious damage.

Cultivation methods of C. pubescens include growing in a nursery for 1 to 1.5 months in early February, then planting in the field when there is no frost risk, generally around March. Potassium, magnesium and zinc are used after transplantation, or after branching or flowering, and are generally applied once every 2 months after harvesting began. Some farmers cultivate C. pubescens among tea trees, C. annuum, or other crops.

=== Pests ===
The plants resist pests in Europe. However, C. pubescens is the host plant of Anastrepha ludens (Mexican fruit fly). A. ludens is one of the most threatening pests of Anastrepha. It is considered an A1 quarantine pest by EPPO (European and Mediterranean Plant Protection Organization). Thus, the importation of fresh C. pubescens is restricted by many countries, and only frozen and manufactured import food are authorized in European market.

=== Pathogens ===
The plants are resistant to several diseases, including the oomycete pathogen Phytophthora capsici, a severe pathogen of pepper production over the world, causing more than $100 million in losses annually. C. pubescens has a thick waxy cuticle which becomes detached during the infection process, called pealing pealing disease in the areas around Oxapampa, Peru.

=== Harvesting ===
C. pubescens matures at least 3 months after flowering, with harvesting 3 to 8 months after transplantation into fields. Fruits were collected weekly every 2 weeks, and the harvesting is continued for 2-3 years, up to 5 years before the occurrence of diseases. Yields produce approximately 0.5 kg per plant per harvest, from up to 40 chilies for one meter tall.

== Gallery ==
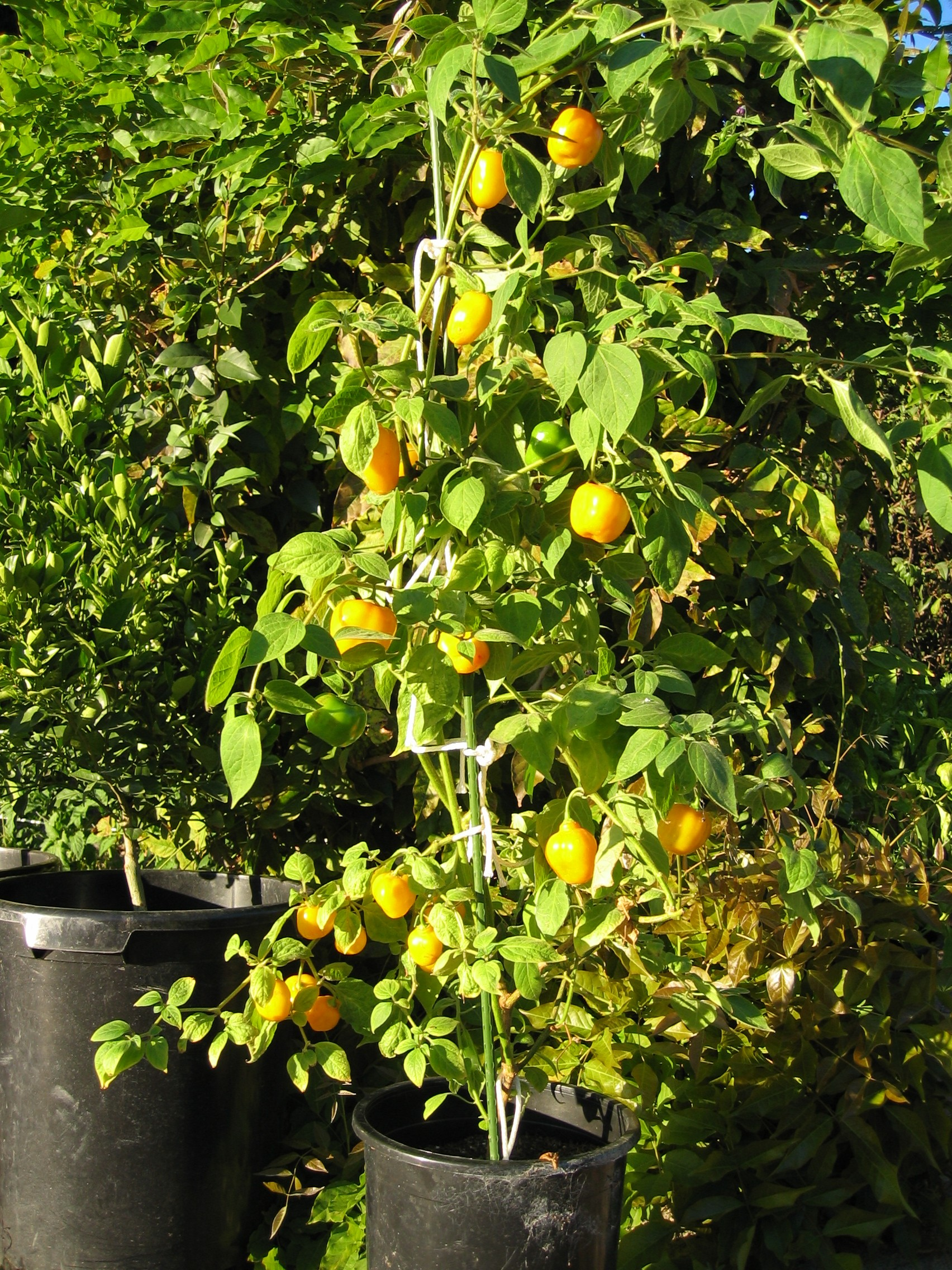
A 'Manzano' pepper plant with ripe pods

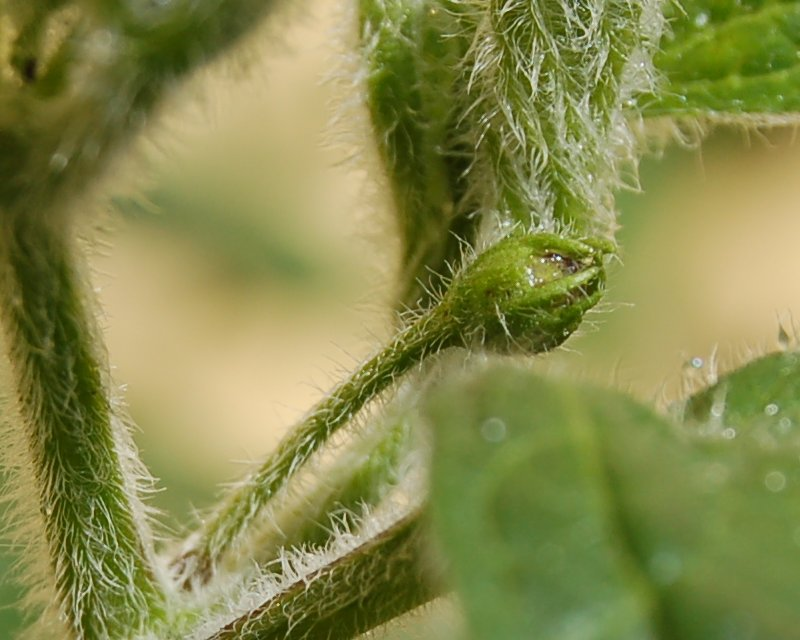
Rukutu flower bud with many trichomes, characteristic that gives this species its name

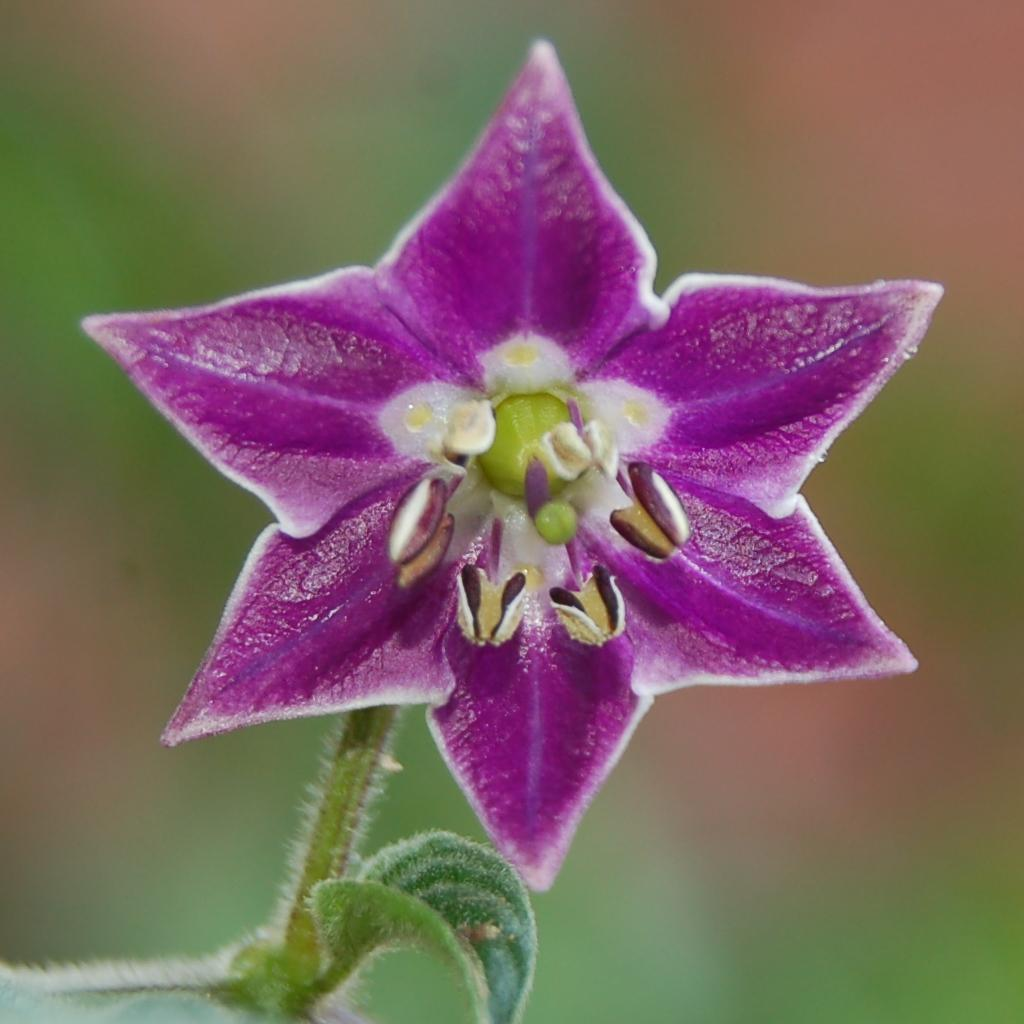
Typical flower of a rukutu: purple corolla with white spots in the center

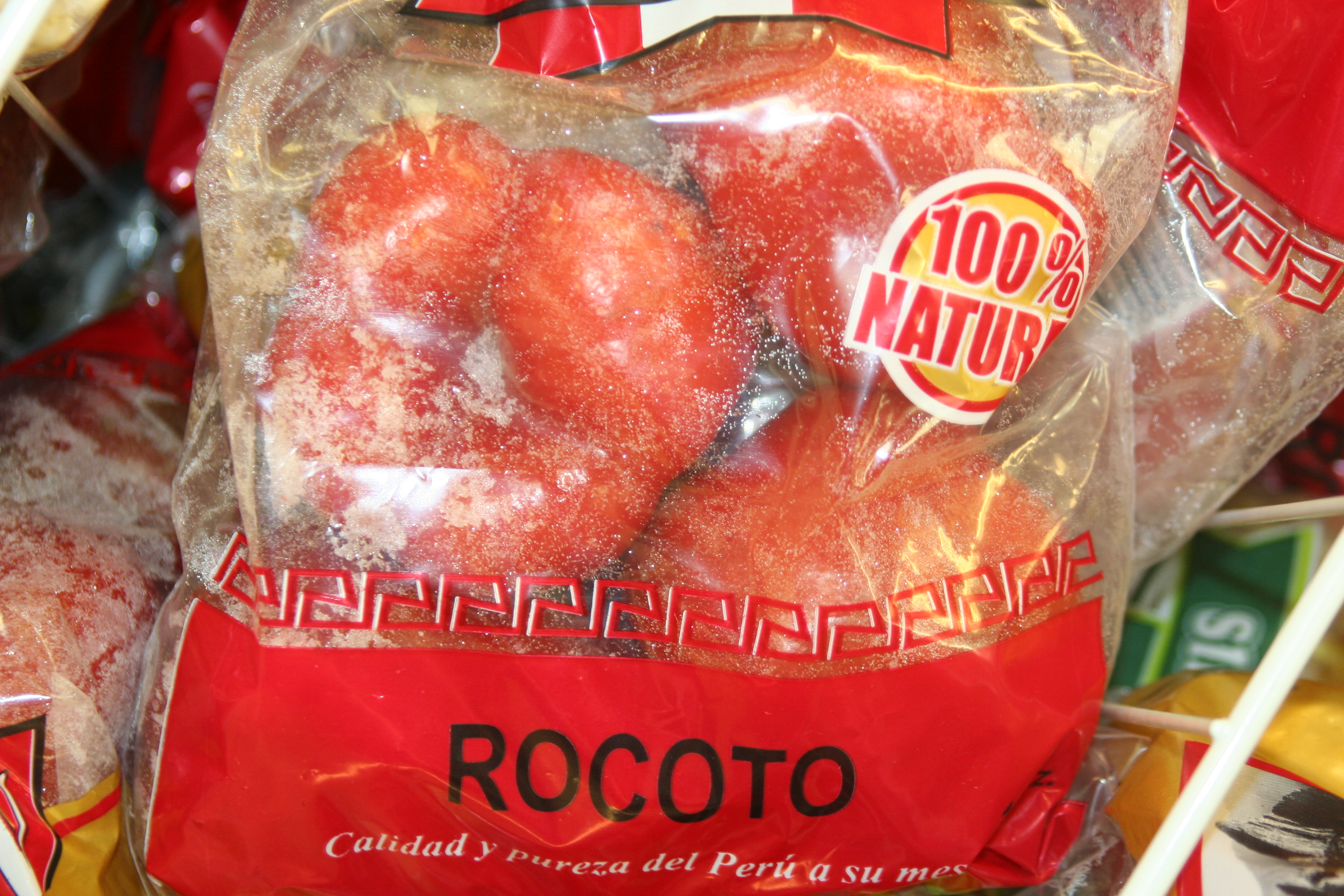
A bag of frozen rukutu for sale at a California market, 2009, and the orange variety is commonly cultivated in coastal Southern California and can be found fresh year-round in produce sections of ethnic markets.

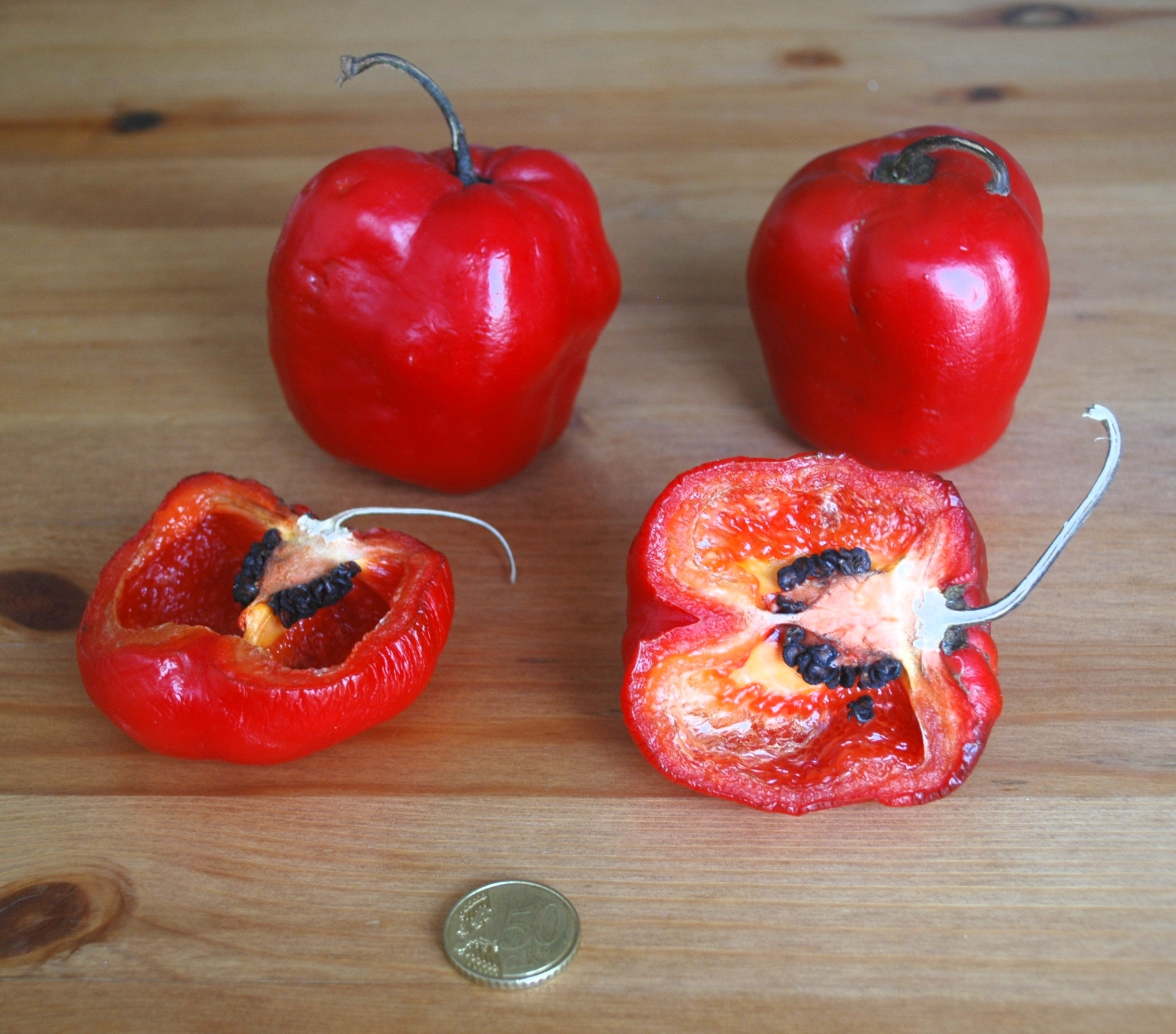
Red Rocoto fruit cross section showing black-seeded fruit

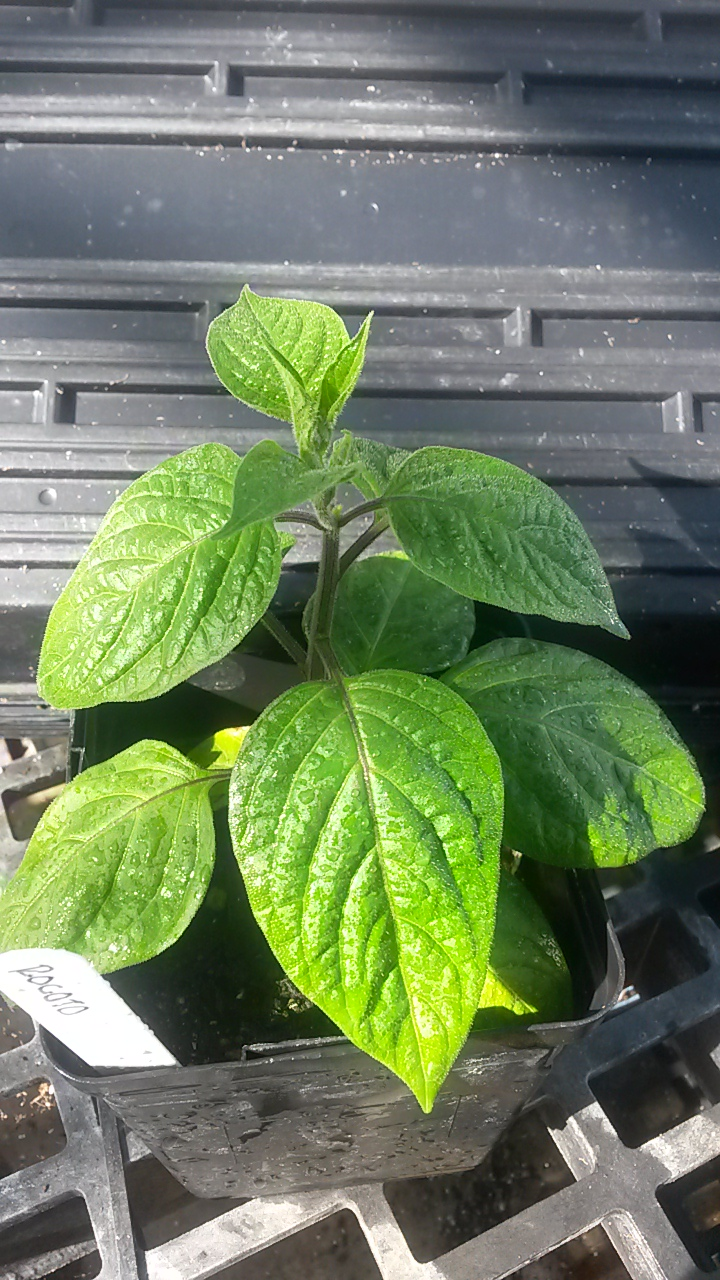
Rocoto plant prior to flowering

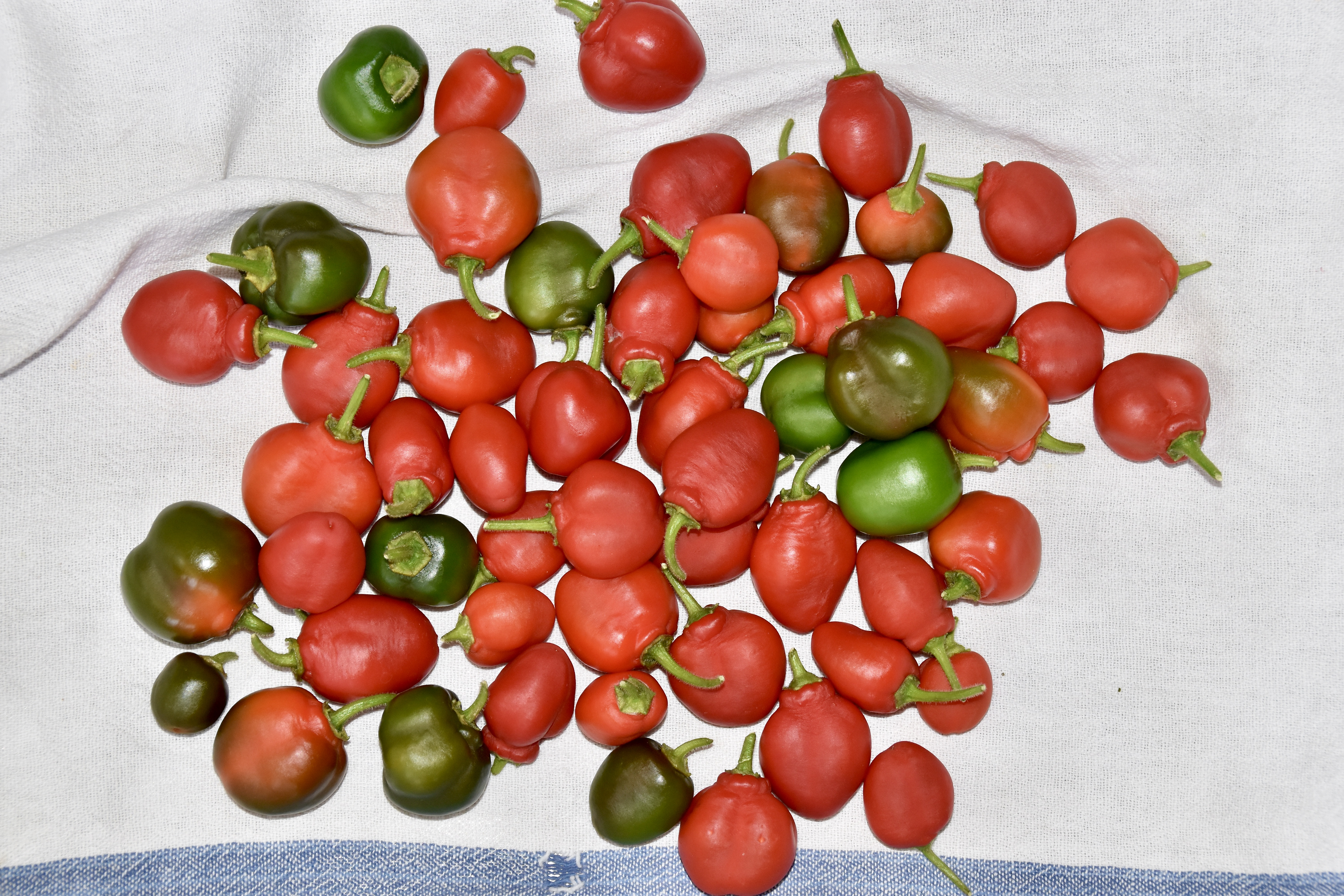
Cultivated Capsicum pubescens pepper fresh harvested fruits

== See also ==
- List of Capsicum cultivars
- Rocoto relleno, baked rocoto stuffed with mince
