= Pickled pepper =

Capsicum pepper preserved by pickling

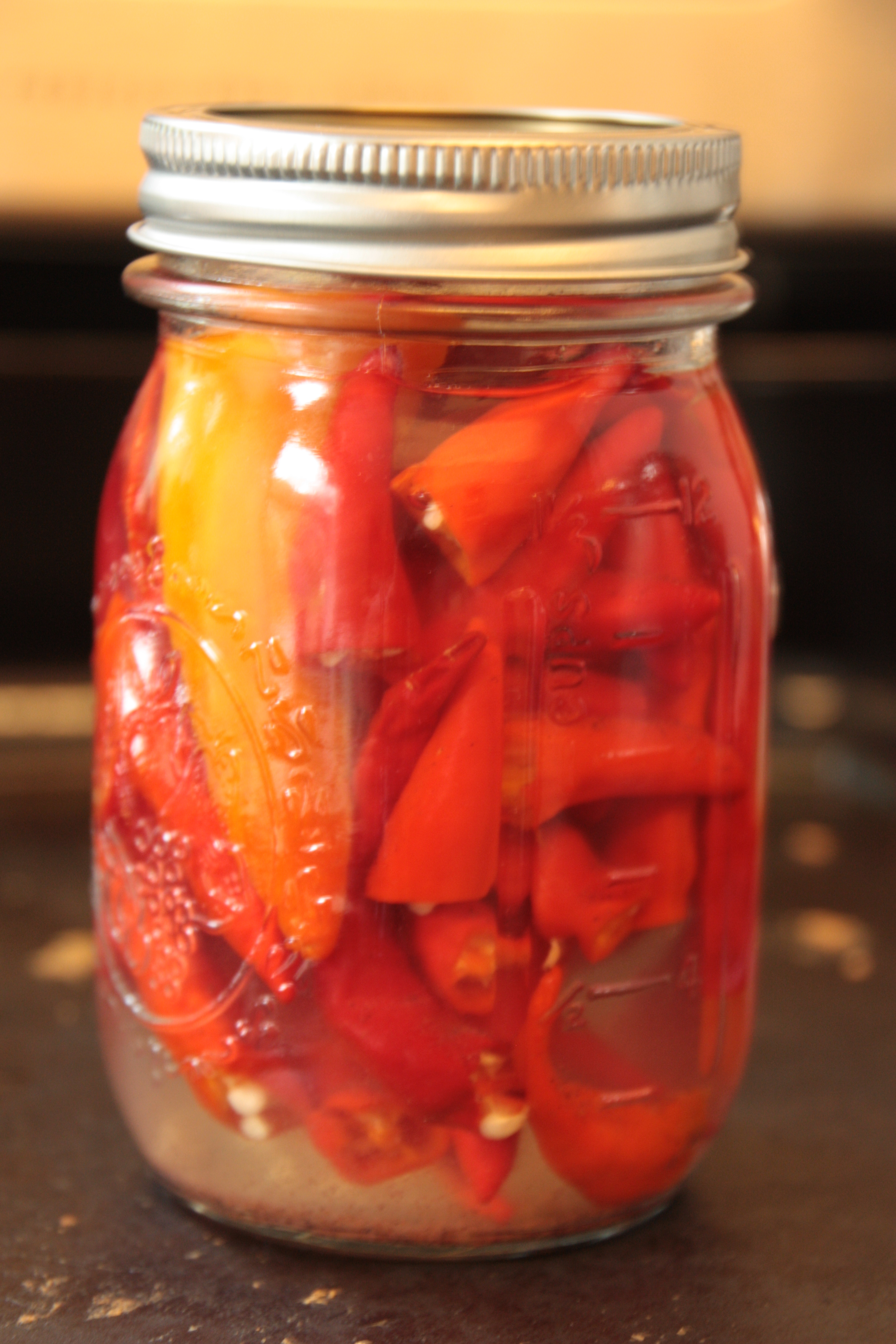
A jar of pickled peppers

A pickled pepper is a Capsicum pepper preserved by pickling, which usually involves submersion in a brine of vinegar and salted water with herbs and spices, often including peppercorns, coriander, dill, and bay leaf.

Common pickled peppers are the banana pepper, the friggitelli, the Cubanelle, the bell pepper, sweet and hot cherry peppers, the Hungarian wax pepper, the Greek pepper, the serrano pepper, and the jalapeño. They are often found in supermarkets alongside pickled cucumbers.

Pickled sliced jalapeños are also used frequently for topping nachos and other Mexican dishes. These peppers are a common ingredient used by sandwich shops such as Quiznos, Subway, and Wawa. Pickled peppers are found throughout the world, such as the Italian peperoncini sott'aceto and Indonesia's pickled bird's eye chili, besides the already-mentioned American and Latin American usages.

The flavored brine of hot yellow peppers is commonly used as a condiment in Southern cooking in the United States.

== Information ==
To achieve the best results and minimize the risk of botulism, only fresh blemish-free peppers should be used and vinegar with acidity of at least 5%; reducing the acidic taste can be achieved by adding sugar. While larger peppers are sliced up to be pickled, smaller peppers are often placed into the pickling solution whole; however, they still require slits so that the vinegar can penetrate the pepper. To avoid botulism it is recommended that pickled pepper products be processed in boiling water if they are to be stored at room temperature; improperly processed peppers led to the largest outbreak of botulism in U.S. history.

As with pickled cucumbers, there are multiple ways of pickling peppers. The most common is as above, pickling in an acidic brine and canned; next is quick-pickled or refrigerator pickling, which skips the canning step and requires the peppers to be stored in the refrigerator as mentioned above. For lacto-fermented pickled peppers, vinegar is omitted from the salty brine; instead, Lactobacilli convert the sugars of the peppers into lactic acid. Such fermented pickled peppers are often used to make hot sauce. At less than 3% acid, fermented pickled peppers are highly perishable if not canned.

Sweet pickling with sugar yields "candied" peppers, with jalapeños prepared this way known as Cowboy Candy. A variant of Cowboy Candy with added pineapple is referred to as Cowgirl Candy or Tropical Cowboy Candy.

Pickled peppers are also often made into relishes.

In Mexico most peppers sold are pickled.

== Pepper mash ==
The industrially important hot pepper mash, used in creation of condiments such as salsas, processed meats, hot sauces, dips, marinades, and table sauces, is made of pickled peppers and may be stored for up to three years for aging purposes to produce sharper flavors before further processing. Its Harmonized System Code is 0904.2073. In the Caribbean the majority of hot peppers produced are processed into a pickled mash prior to further processing.

Tabasco sauce is created by creating a pepper mash with the salt and the peppers, which then undergoes lacto-fermentation for up to 3 years before additional vinegar is added and after mixing; the pulp and skins are strained out. GraceKennedy produced 660,000 kilograms (1,460,000 lb) of hot pickled pepper mash in Jamaica in 2014 up from 325,000 kilograms (717,000 lb) in 2013 from local Jamaica farmers, in 2012 most production in Jamaica by GraceKennedy of hot pickled pepper mash for use in hot sauces was imported from Costa Rica. This was part of a joint effort by the Jamaican ministry of agriculture and GraceKennedy to increase mash production in Jamaica with a new facility, and decrease dependence on imported peppers through a series of 16 pepper nurseries. Texas Pete's hot pepper mash is pickled for two years from Cayenne peppers, while Frank's RedHot is aged for 7–12 months.

For Huy Fong Sriracha sauce garlic and sugar are added prior to the fermentation process of the mash.

The Aztec peoples of Mesoamerica were making pickled pepper hot sauces prior to the Spanish conquest.

== See also ==
- Pepper jelly – Preserve made with hot peppers
- Gochujang – Spicy fermented Korean condiment
- Hot sauce – Condiment made from chili peppers
- Pickled cucumber – Small pickled and fermented cucumber
- Pickled fruit – Fruit preserved in brine or vinegar
- Giardiniera – Italian relish of pickled vegetables in vinegar or oil
