= List of Capsicum cultivars =

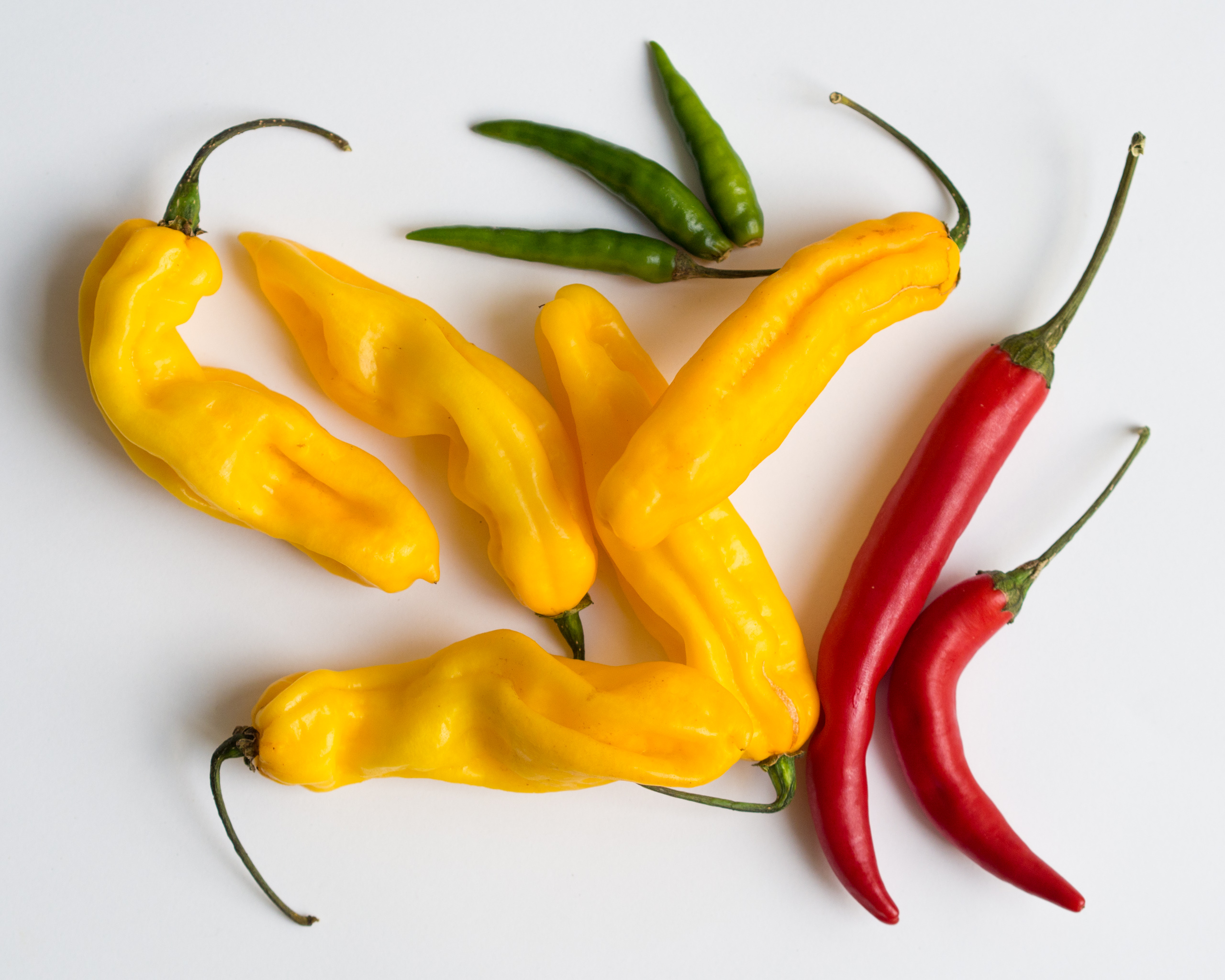
Bird's eye (green), 'Madame Jeanette' (yellow), and cayenne peppers (red)

This is a list of Capsicum cultivars belonging to the five major species of cultivated peppers (genus Capsicum): C. annuum, C. chinense, C. baccatum, C. frutescens, and C. pubescens. Due to the large and changing number of cultivars, and the variation of cultivar namings in different regions, this list only gives a few examples of the estimated 5000 pepper varieties that exist.

== Overview ==
There are perhaps fifty thousand Capsicum cultivars grown worldwide. The USDA-ARS GRIN seed collection contains 6,200 Capsicum accessions alone, including 4,000 Capsicum annuum accessions. The other Capsicum species in the USDA germplasm repository include: C. chinense, C. baccatum, C. frutescens, C. pubescens, C. cardenasii, C. chacoense, C. flexuosum, C. eximium, C. rhomboideum, C. galapagoense, and C. tovarii.

There are five major species of cultivated Capsicum, C. annuum, C. chinense, C. baccatum, C. frutescens, C. pubescens, and, within those species, there are several "taxonomic varieties". Because many species can cross and generate inter-specific hybrids, albeit with low success, there are also "complexes" of closely related and sexually compatible species within the Capsicum genus. This includes the Capsicum annuum complex, which consists of C. annuum, C. frutescens, and C. chinense.

Major species and their taxonomic varieties:

- Capsicum annuum, which includes bell peppers, cayennes, friggitello, jalapeños, paprika, and serrano.
  - Capsicum annuum 'New Mexico Group', common name Hatch or Anaheim, which includes Big Jim, Chimayó, and Sandia peppers.
- Capsicum baccatum, which includes the South American varieties, such as ají amarillo, ají limón, and criolla sella.
- Capsicum chinense, which includes all of the habaneros, Scotch bonnets, Trinidad Scorpions, the Bhut Jolokia, and the Carolina Reaper.
- Capsicum frutescens, which includes the Tabasco pepper and many of the peppers grown in India; sometimes not distinguished as a species separate from C. annuum.
- Capsicum pubescens, which includes the rocoto and manzano pepper, are distinctive plants, having violet flowers, black seeds, and hairy dark green leaves, and grow as a large, multi-stemmed vine up to 5 meters long.

== List of cultivars ==
The species and varieties include many economically important cultivars with a variety of different shapes, colors, and flavors that are grown for different purposes, such as spices, vegetables, and herbal medicines. Some confusion has resulted from the legal term "plant variety", which is used interchangeably with "cultivar" (not with "taxonomic variety"). The terminology around a cultivar also includes terms such as heirloom, open-pollinated, self-pollinating, and hybrid.

Heirloom varieties are typically those that have been selected and grown historically with seeds saved every year, and are still maintained today in similar fashion, such as the blocky-type California Wonder. Open-pollinated varieties are those that are maintained without strict barriers to prevent outcrossing and then seed is collected at and stored from each harvest such as the lamuyo-type Marconi Yellow. While open-pollinated varieties are typically true-to-type, there may be occasional outcrossing to other Capsicum varieties that may introduce some heterogeneity. Self-pollinated varieties are similar to open-pollinated varieties in that they are true-to-type and seed is collected at and stored from each harvest, but measures are taken to minimize outcrossing. This may involve placing a barrier such as a mesh bag or cage over the plant to prevent pollinators from reaching flowers, ensuring that the plant has "selfed". This is how much seed intended for home-garden use is produced, like the cultivar Early Jalapeño. These three types of cultivar seed production are all similar in that only one parent is used and the seed are produced generally through self-pollination.

Hybrid varieties take advantage of a phenomenon called heterosis or hybrid vigor, which occurs in pepper. To generate a hybrid variety, two self-pollinated varieties are intentionally crossed, and all seed from this cross are collected. The new hybrid variety typically is more vigorous than either of the two parents contributing to traits such as higher yield. Inter-specific crossing may result in a hybrid of diminished fertility due to specific genetic incompatibilities. In some cases, this may be overcome by deliberately selecting which of the two parents is to be the female parent in the cross. Hybrid seed if saved will not produce a homogeneous set of plants the next generation, meaning that the two parents will need to be crossed again to generate more hybrid seed. This method is used to produce hybrid Capsicum cultivars such as the blocky types Double-Up and Orange Blaze. Much of the commercial pepper production uses hybrid varieties for their improved traits.

=== Capsicum annuum ===
Capsicum annuum, native from southern North America through Central America to South America, has been cultivated by Indigenous peoples of the Americas for thousands of years, and globally for over 400 years. Its fruit forms are varied, from large to small, sweet to sour, and very hot/pungent to bland. Despite being a single species, C. annuum has many forms, with a variety of names, even in the same language. Official names aside, in American English, any variety lacking heat is colloquially known as a sweet pepper, and those sweet peppers that have a blocky shape are referred to as bell peppers. A variety that produces capsaicin is colloquially known as a hot pepper or chili pepper. In British English, the sweet varieties are called "peppers" or "sweet peppers" and the hot varieties "chillies", whereas in Australian English and Indian English, the name "capsicum" is commonly used for bell peppers exclusively and "chilli" is often used to encompass the hotter varieties.

The plant is a tender perennial subshrub, with a densely branched stem. The plant reaches 0.5–1.5 m (20–59 in). Single white flowers develop into the fruit, which is typically green when unripe, but may lack chlorophyll causing a white color. Ripening fruits usually change to red, although some varieties may ripen to yellow, orange, peach, brown, or purple. The species are grown in temperate climates as an annual, but they are especially productive in warm and dry climates.

Capsicum annuum
| Image | Name | Type | Origin | Heat | Pod size | Description |
|---|---|---|---|---|---|---|
| | Aleppo | | Syria and Turkey | 15,000 SHU | | Grown in Syria and Turkey and used, in coarsely ground, dried form, as a spice that is also called aleppo pepper |
| | Anaheim | Anaheim | United States | 500–2,500 SHU | 15 cm (5.9 in) | A mild variety of New Mexico chile. It was later brought to California from New Mexico by Emilio Ortega in the 1900s. Often it is used for chile relleno. When mature, it takes on a red color and is referred to as a colorado. |
| | Baklouti | | Tunisia | 1,000–5,000 SHU | | Grown in North Africa. Used in Harissa. |
| | Banana | Waxy | | 0–500 SHU | 15 cm (5.9 in) | Often it is pickled and used as an ingredient in sandwiches; its piquancy is not very hot. Its shape and color resemble a banana. |
| | Bird's Eye | Small hot | Southeast Asia | 50,000–100,000 SHU | 4 cm (1.6 in) | A Southeast Asian cultivar known by many local names, but generally it is called Thai chili in the United States. It has thin fruit with a pointed tip. |
| | Black Heart | Ornamental/ Culinary | Austria | 5,000–20,000 SHU | 2–3 cm (≈ 0.8-1.2 in) | Plants can grow up to 1.2 m (47 in), the flowers are purple. Young leaves show purple veins, which may turn dark green later on. The heart-shaped fruits mature from black to red. |
| | Black Hungarian | Ornamental/ Culinary | Hungary | 5,000–10,000 SHU | 5–7 cm (≈ 2–3 in) | Grows in a conical shape with a slight curve near the tip. Starting from green, they ripen first to a slightly shiny deep purple to black which is only skin deep; when sliced open, the thick flesh of the interior is green. As it continues to ripen, it morphs to red. |
| | Cascabel | | Mexico | 3,000 SHU | 2.5 cm (1 in) | The small, round fruit are usually dried, and have a distinct, nutty flavor. The name, Spanish for "rattle" or "jingle bell", derives from the rattling noise made by the seeds inside the dried pod. |
| | Cascabella | Waxy | | 1,500–6,000 SHU | 6 cm (2 1/2 in) | Not to be confused with the Cascabel pepper, this spicy variant of the wax pepper is often pickled, sold by fast food restaurants like In-N-Out and Jack in the Box. |
| | Cayenne (Red) | Cayenne | French Guiana | 30,000–50,000 SHU | 13 cm (5 in) | This long, thin fruit was transported by the Portuguese to China and India, where it is used widely. Often it is dried and ground into powder. |
| | Cheongyang | Long, hot | Korea | 10,000 SHU | | A medium-sized chilli cultivar, named after Cheongsong and Yeongyang Counties when developed by Dr Yoo Il-Woong(유일웅), by hybridizing local Jejudo chilli with Bird's eye chilli. |
| | Cherry | Cherry | | Cultivar dependent | | Named for the fruit they resemble, this type of red, round chili pepper has both sweet and spicy variants. This pepper can be enjoyed both fresh and cooked, and is a staple of Hungarian cuisine. |
| | Chilaca | Pasilla | Mexico | 1,000–2,000 SHU | 15 cm (5.9 in) | Popular in Mexican cuisine, it is almost always encountered dried; in this state, it is referred to as a pasilla. The pasilla has a dark brown color and a smoky flavor. |
| | Chiltepin | Chiltepin | Mexico | 50,000–100,000 SHU | 0.5 cm (0.20 in) | This small, hot fruit is often eaten by birds. The plant is thought to be the ancestor of the cultivated C. annuum peppers. Evidence indicates it has been consumed by humans as far back as 7,500 BC. |
| | Chilhuacle | Chilhuacle | Mexico (Oaxaca) | 1.500–2.000 SHU | 8 cm (3.1 in) | Chile huacle or chilhuacle (from Náhuatl, chilli 'chile' and huactli 'viejo') is a variety of chili (Capsicum annuum) produced and consumed in the Sierra de Flores Magón region of Oaxaca, Mexico. Despite little availability, it is the original chili with which several Oaxacan moles are prepared. They are found in three varieties: black, red and yellow chilhuacle, and are mainly used dry. |
| | Chimayó | | United States | 4,000–6,000 SHU | | |
| | Cubanelle | | | 1–1,000 SHU | 13 cm (5 in) | Medium in thickness, the tapered fruit is green when unripe, but turns red when mature. Often it is fried in Italian cooking. |
| | Dangjo | | Korea | | | Light green or bright yellow chili peppers with mild heat. |
| | De Árbol | | Mexico | 15,000–30,000 SHU | 8 cm (3.1 in) | This slender-fruited cultivar is grown primarily in Mexico, its name is Spanish for "from a tree". |
| | Elephant Trunk | | Balkans | | 15-20 cm | This plant typically has rough skin with cork-like texture that is reminiscent of elephant skin and gives it its characteristic look and name. |
| | Facing Heaven | Pimiento | China | 30,000-50,000SHU | | |
| | Fish | | | 5,000–30,000 SHU | | |
| | Fresno | Fresno | United States | 2,500–10,000 SHU | 9 cm (3.5 in) | Similar to the jalapeño, but with thinner walls, it is generally used ripe, and has a higher vitamin content. Frequently it is used in ceviche, and is one of the most frequently used chilis in salsa. |
| | Friggitelli (Peperoncini) | Waxy | Italy | 100–500 SHU | 8 cm (3.1 in) | Sweet-tasting and mild, used extensively in Italian and Greek cuisine, very frequently pickled. |
| | Guntur chilli | | Andhra Pradesh, Telangana, South India | 30,000–350,000 SHU | | It is well known as a commercial crop used as a condiment, culinary supplement, or vegetable. |
| | Hungarian Wax | Waxy | | 2,500–8,000 SHU | | This wide, medium-hot variety is used in Hungarian cuisine, frequently pickled. Also it is commonly dried, ground, and presented as "paprika". |
| | Italian Sweet | Long, sweet | Italy | | | Used in Spanish cuisine |
| | Jalapeño | Jalapeño | Mexico | 2,500–8,000 SHU | 9 cm (3.5 in) | Very popular, especially in the United States, it is often pickled or canned. A smoke-dried ripe jalapeño is referred to as a chipotle. |
| | Jwala chili (finger hot pepper) | | India | 20,000-30,000 SHU | | Grown in Kheda and Mehsana districts of Gujarat and frequently used in Indian home cooking. |
| | Korean chili | | Korea | 1,500 SHU | 7.6–10.2 cm (3–4 in) | Also known as "Korean Dark Green", "Korean Long Green", "Korean Red" or "Korean Hot" |
| | Medusa | Ornamental | | 1,000 SHU | | It is a sweet, ornamental chili pepper which grows upright and has brightly colored fruit. |
| | Mirasol | | Mexico | 2,000–5,000 SHU | | The dried form of the Mirasol chili is called guajillo, and is used to make a red sauce used for tamales. |
| | NuMex peppers | Ornamental | United States | | | The Chile Pepper Institute at New Mexico State University has developed a number of unusual chile cultivars. NuMex Twilight peppers pictured. |
| | Peter Pepper | Ornamental | United States and Mexico | 5,000–30,000 SHU | 8–10 cm (3.1–3.9 in) | Rare, heirloom-type hot pepper cultivated for its unique shape. |
| | Peperoncino | Cayenne | Italy | 15,000–30,000 SHU | | Generic Italian name for hot chili peppers, specifically the cultivars of the species Capsicum annuum and Capsicum frutescens. |
| | Peperone crusco | Sweet | Italy | 0 SHU | | Italian name for crispy pepper, a dry and sweet variety of capsicum annuum typical of the Basilicata region. |
| | Pimiento | | | 100-500 SHU | | This cultivar's fruit is small and heart-shaped. It is typically used fresh, or pickled and jarred, and is often used to stuff green olives. It is also called pimento. |
| | Pequin | Small Hot | Mexico | 100,000–140,000 SHU | | Also spelled piquín |
| | Piment d'Espelette | Pimiento | Basque Country (French part) | 1,500 - 2,500 SHU | | Fresh fruits, plants and seeds are known as "Gorria", dried fruits are called "Piment d'Espelette". "Gorria" is the Basque word for "red". Grown in Espelette since ca. 1650. |
| | Padrón | Pimiento | Spain | 500–5,000 SHU | 3.5–6 cm (1.4–2.4 in) | Sometimes also called pimientos de Herbón, from the Spanish region of Galicia. Most are mild, though about 1 out of 10 may be quite hot. |
| | Poblano | Poblano | Mexico | 1,000–2,000 SHU | 13 cm (5.1 in) | The large, heart-shaped, dark green fruit is extremely popular in Mexico, often to make chile relleno. When harvested early and dried, it is referred to as an ancho, When fully mature and dried, it is referred to as a mulato. |
| | Prairie Fire | | | | | |
| | Prik Kee Nu | Small Hot | Thailand | 50,000–100,000 SHU | 3 cm (1.2 in) | One of many cultivars called Thai pepper, it has very short fruit, and is very hot. Thai: พริกขี้หนู, RTGS: phrik khi nu, IPA: [pʰrík kʰîː nǔː], literal: Mouse/rat dropping chili. |
| | Puya | | Mexico | 5,000 SHU | | Capsicum annuum L., hot, medium-size, green to red, and tapered Also known as a 'Pulla'. |
| | Santa Fe Grande | Fresno | | | | The Santa Fe Grande is a very prolific variety used in the Southwestern United States. The conical, blunt fruits ripen from greenish-yellow, to orange-yellow to red. The peppers grow upright on 24-inch plants. Santa Fe Grande has a slightly sweet taste and is fairly mild in pungency. |
| | Serrano | Serrano | Mexico | 10,000–23,000 SHU | 5 cm (2.0 in) | The thin, tapered fruit turns red when mature. Due to its thin skin, it is sometimes eaten without being first peeled. |
| | Shishito | | Japan | 50-200 SHU | | |
| | Siling Mahaba | | Philippines | 50,000 SHU | | A chili pepper grown in the Philippines, and a popular ingredient in Filipino cuisine |
| Xcatik | Xcatic | | Mexico | | | A chili pepper local to the Yucatan peninsula, particularly popular in the Merida area. |

=== Capsicum baccatum ===
These have a distinctive, fruity flavor, and are commonly ground into colorful powders for use in cooking, each identified by its color.

Capsicum baccatum
| Image | Name | Origin | Heat | Pod size | Description |
|---|---|---|---|---|---|
| | Bishop's Crown | | 10,000–30,000 SHU | 6 cm (2.4 in) | C. baccatum strain from Barbados. Medium hot pods have a unique shape which resembles the hat of a bishop. Sturdy plants, can be grown as perennials. Also known as bishop's hat, orchid, ají flor, monk's hat. |
| | Aji Limon | | 30,000–50,000 SHU | 4 cm (1.6 in) | Very productive C. baccatum variety. Pods are thin walled and have a fruity taste with medium heat. |
| | Piquante pepper | South Africa | 1,000–2,000 SHU | 2 cm (0.79 in) | Mild, sweet and tangy flavour, usable in many dishes |
| | Sugar Rush Peach | Wales | 10,000–20,000 SHU | | Sweet, fruity aji-type C. baccatum discovered in 2012 as an open-pollinated seedling of the 'Sugar Rush Red' in the garden of Welsh breeder Chris Fowler, who selected and stabilised it and introduced it through his Welsh Dragon Chilli nursery. Pods ripen from green through yellow to peach. |
| | Sugar Rush Stripey | Wales | 25,000–50,000 SHU (estimated) | | Striped-pod form within the 'Sugar Rush' C. baccatum group. The original Sugar Rush was raised in Finland and its seed passed to the Welsh breeder Chris Fowler; striped pods that appeared on his Sugar Rush Peach plants were saved and stabilised as this cultivar. Pods are striped and ripen to a peach or orange base, with a sweet, fruity flavour. |
| | Brazilian Starfish | Brazil | 10,000–30,000 SHU | 4 cm (1.6 in) | Heirloom aji from Brazil with flattened, multi-lobed pods resembling a star, ripening to red or golden yellow. Sweet and fruity with mild to medium heat, and a heavy cropper. |

=== Capsicum chinense ===
Capsicum chinense or "Chinese capsicum" is a misnomer since all Capsicum species originated in the New World. Nikolaus Joseph von Jacquin (1727–1817), a Dutch botanist, named the species in that way in 1776 because he believed they originated in China. Most of the peppers of this species have a distinctive flavor and are similar in flavor to each other.

Capsicum chinense
| Image | Name | Origin | Heat | Pod size | Description |
|---|---|---|---|---|---|
| | Adjuma | | 100,000–500,000 SHU | | Very hot, originally cultivated in Suriname |
| | Ají Dulce | | 0–500 SHU | | It is a type of seasoning pepper. It refers to a specific variety of Capsicum chinense that is related to the habanero but with a much milder flavor. |
| | Bhut Jolokia | Northeast India | Up to 1,040,000 SHU | 6 cm (2.4 in) | This cultivar was once confirmed by Guinness World Records to be the hottest pepper. It is an interspecific hybrid, largely C. chinense with some C. frutescens genes. It is also known as naga jolokia and ghost pepper. |
| | Carolina Reaper | United States | 1,569,300–2,200,000 SHU | | Extremely hot pepper, was once the Guinness World Records holder for hottest pepper. Developed by Ed Currie |
| | Datil | | 100,000–300,000 SHU | | A very hot chili; primarily grown in Florida |
| | Fatalii | | 125,000–325,000 SHU | 6 cm (2.4 in) | Grown in central and southern Africa, it is very similar in appearance to and often confused with the devil's tongue habanero. |
| | Habanero | | 100,000–350,000 SHU | 5 cm (2.0 in) | Once considered to be the hottest chili pepper, the habanero has been surpassed by other hot varieties, but it is nonetheless hotter than most commonly available cultivars. The habanero has a subtle, fruity flavour and a floral aroma. It is closely related to many other very hot peppers. Disseminated to China over 500 years ago by Spanish and Portuguese explorers, it became so much a part of Chinese cuisine, botanists who found it in China thought it was native to the area and thus named this species Capsicum chinense, based on the habaneros from China. |
| | Hainan Yellow Lantern | | 300,000 SHU | 5 cm × 3 cm (2.0 in × 1.2 in) | Also known as the yellow emperor chili, it grows only in Hainan, China. |
| | Infinity chili | | 1,176,182 SHU (Note: Contested as being the result of testing a single specimen and thus not establishing a consistent result for a cultivar.) | | |
| | Madame Jeanette | Suriname | 100,000–350,000 SHU | | Originally cultivated in Suriname |
| | Naga Morich | Bangladesh and India | 1,000,000 SHU | | |
| | Naga Viper | England | 1,382,118 SHU | | |
| | NuMex peppers | United States | | | The Chile Pepper Institute at New Mexico State University has developed a number of unusual chile cultivars. NuMex Suave Orange peppers pictured. |
| | Pepper X | United States | 2,693,000 SHU | | Extremely hot pepper. As of August 23, 2023, is recognized by Guinness World Records as the world's hottest pepper. Developed by Ed Currie |
| | Red Savina | United States | 200,000–580,000 SHU | | |
| | Scotch Bonnet | | 150,000–325,000 SHU | 5 cm (2.0 in) | Named because of its resemblance to a Tam o' shanter, this fruit is closely related to the habanero and is similarly hot. Due to its heat and distinct flavour, it is often used in Caribbean cuisine. |
| | Trinidad moruga scorpion | | Up to 2,000,000 SHU | | Former World-record holder for hottest chili as of 2012. |
| | Trinidad Scorpion 'Butch T' | | Up to 1,400,000 SHU | | Former world-record hottest chili. |
| | Aji Charapita | Peru | 30,000–50,000 SHU | 1 cm (0.39 in) | Small, round, yellow C. chinense from the Peruvian Amazon, used in Peruvian cooking and sauces. It has been widely publicised as one of the world's most expensive peppers, a description that traces to marketing rather than documented sales. |
| | 7 Pot Primo | Louisiana, US | 1,000,000–1,473,480 SHU | | Superhot C. chinense bred in Louisiana by Troy Primeaux from a cross of Naga Morich and Trinidad 7 Pot, grown out from around 2005. The wrinkled red pods often end in a distinctive scorpion-like tail, and its heat has been measured at over 1.4 million Scoville units. |

=== Capsicum frutescens ===
Sometimes considered to be the same species as C. annuum

Capsicum frutescens
| Image | Name | Origin | Heat | Pod size | Description |
|---|---|---|---|---|---|
| | Kambuzi | Malawi | 50,000–175,000 SHU | | Kambuzi is a small, round chili pepper cultivar that is found in central region of Malawi, a landlocked country in southeast Africa. |
| | Labuyo (Filipino birdseye) | Philippines | 80,000–100,000 SHU | 0.51 to 1.78 cm (0.2 to 0.7 in) | A small, cone-shaped cultivar grown in the Philippines. |
| | Peri-peri (African Birdseye) | Southern Africa, Central Africa, and West Africa | 50,000–175,000 SHU | 1.9 to 3.2 cm (0.75 to 1.25 in) | Also known as piri piri, it is common in Portugal and former Portuguese colonies in southern Africa |
| | Malagueta | The Caribbean | 60,000–100,000 SHU | 4.8 cm (1.9 in) | A small, tapered chili widely used in the Caribbean, Brazil, and Portugal |
| | Tabasco | Mexico | 30,000–50,000 SHU | 4 cm (1.6 in) | Used in Tabasco sauce. The fruit is only used when it is a particular red color measured with "le petit bâton rouge". |
| | Xiao mi la pepper | China | 75,000 SHU | | The name xiao mi la literally translates to little rice chili in English. Xiao mi la is one of the three most commonly used peppers in Chinese cuisine. |

=== Capsicum pubescens ===
Capsicum pubescens is among the oldest of domesticated peppers, and was grown as long as 5,000 years ago. It is probably related to undomesticated plants that still grow in South America (C. cardenasii, C. eximium, and others).

Capsicum pubescens
| Image | Name | Origin | Heat | Pod size | Description |
|---|---|---|---|---|---|
| | Canário | Peru | 30,000–50,000 SHU | 6.5 cm (2.6 in) | Canário is a medium hot C. pubescens variety. Thick walled pods are dark yellow when fully ripe and have the size of a small apple. This South American strain thrives well under cool growing conditions and can be grown as a perennial. |
| | Rocoto | Peru, Bolivia | 30,000–100,000 SHU | | Also known as a Manzano or Locoto pepper, there are many Rocoto varieties. "Manzano" is the Spanish word for "apple", and describes the fruits' shape. Note the black seeds. |

== See also ==
- International Code of Nomenclature for Cultivated Plants
- USDA National Plant Germplasm System
- New Mexico State University: Chile Pepper Institute
