= Cascabella pepper =

Spicy wax pepper of the species Capsicum annuum

Cascabella
- Pickled cascabella peppers
- Species: Capsicum annuum
- Cultivar: Cascabella
- Heat: Medium
- Scoville scale: 1,500–6,000 SHU

The cascabella pepper is a hot pepper of the species Capsicum annuum. It is a short-fruited cultivar of the wax pepper, typically growing to no larger than 6 cm (2 1/2 in) long and 2 cm (1 in) wide. Spicy with a fruity flavor, cascabella peppers are usually harvested when yellow and sold in pickled form by companies such as Mezzetta. They vary in heat between 1,500 and 6,000 on the Scoville scale.

== Use in fast food ==
Pickled cascabella peppers are commonly used by fast food restaurants such as In-N-Out and Jack in the Box. In 2016, a shortage in supply caused by poor soil and rain led to a reduction of up to 60%, forcing many restaurants to switch to banana peppers. A similar shortage occurred at the beginning of 2023.
