= Cascabel =

Cascabel may refer to:

- Cascabel (artillery), a subassembly of a muzzle-loading cannon
- Cascabel chili, a small, round chili pepper
- Cascabel, a Shuttle Loop roller coaster at Chapultepec Park in Mexico City
- Spanish common name for Crotalus durissus, a venomous South American rattlesnake
- Cascabel, Arizona, an area along the San Pedro River north of Benson, Arizona
- César Cascabel, a novel by Jules Verne
- Cascabel, a short-lived satirical newspaper in Buenos Aires
