= Sal, Kris & Charlie's Deli =

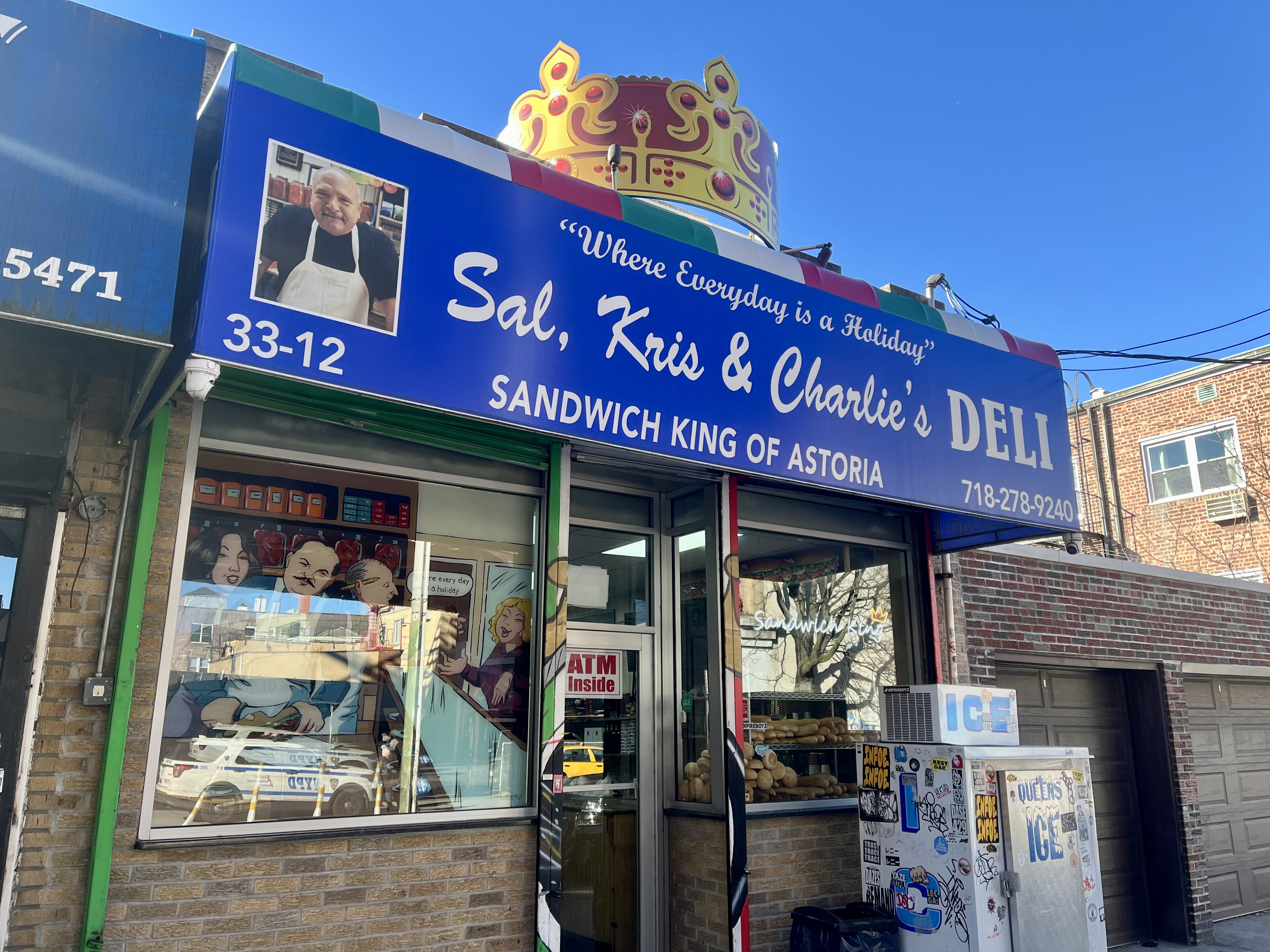
- The deli in 2025
- Interactive map of Sal, Kris & Charlie's Deli

Restaurant information
- Established: 1940
- Owner: John Gordon
- Previous owner: Charlie Gordon
- Food type: Submarine sandwiches
- Location: Astoria, Queens, New York
- Coordinates: 40°46′24″N 73°54′42″W

Sal, Kris & Charlie's Deli, also known as The Sandwich King of Astoria, is a deli located on 33-12 23rd Avenue in Astoria, Queens, near the Astoria–Ditmars Boulevard station. Established in 1940, it was run since then by the Gordon family. In 1987, Charlie Gordon became the shop's third owner until his death in 2019 at the age of 60, after which it was inherited by his son, John Gordon. The deli is named after him, his wife, Kris, and the shop's counterman, Sal, with the "Sandwich King" name coming from Charlie's nickname at the time. While the deli used to sell canned goods and small $1 sandwiches, Charlie, a former baker, preferred heavy sandwiches, and specialized the deli as a sandwich restaurant selling 14-inch-long heroes. The restaurant's most well-known sandwich is "The Bomb", a mix of Italian and American cold cuts topped with American and Provolone cheese, lettuce, onions, tomatoes, hot peppers, sweet peppers, and mayonnaise and vinegar. It was invented by accident when a customer told Charlie he could make whatever he wanted, and the resulting sandwich caught on with customers. In 2013, an airplane passenger, Jason Michael Cruz, was detained by the TSA after discussing the sandwich with a friend and claiming he "had the wrong kind of bomb", which was mistaken for a terrorist threat. Other foods served by the deli include coffee and house-made pickled peppers that are also used to top their sandwiches.

== Reception ==
Ted Berg of USA Today reviewed the Bomb hero, calling it "remarkably delicious". Saying that he initially believed it to be "gimmicky" and "a giant mountain of deli meat", he called it "pretty salty" but a "genius" combination of meat types and an "awesome mess". Noting that the cost "would be a reasonable price for a sandwich 1/3 this size" and estimating that it had at least a pound of cold cuts, he stated that he saved half of it for later. Actor and comedian Michael Rapaport declared the deli "the best in the city", with John stating that he came there several times a year. The Infatuation wrote that their sandwiches were "roughly the same dimensions as a newborn", describing the Bomb as "locally famous".
