= Chile de árbol =

Variety of chili pepper

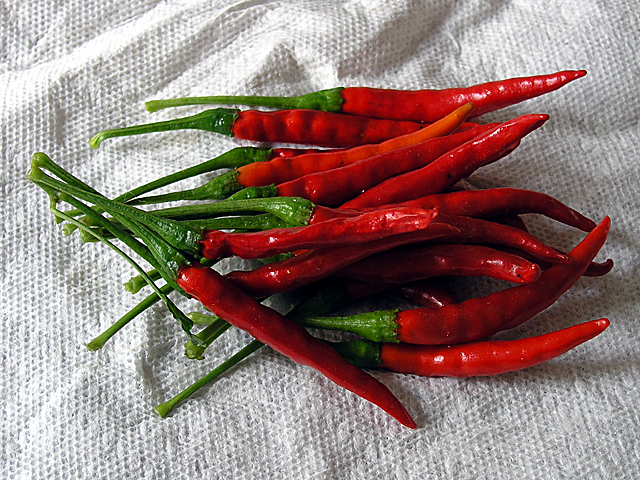
- Fresh mature chile de árbol peppers
- Species: Capsicum annuum
- Cultivar: 'De Árbol'
- Origin: Mexico
- Heat: Hot
- Scoville scale: 15,000 to 30,000 SHU

The chile de árbol (lit. 'chili from tree') is a small and potent Mexican chili pepper also known as bird's beak chile and rat's tail chile. These chilis are about 5 to 7.5 cm (2.0 to 3.0 in) long, and 0.65 to 1 cm (0.26 to 0.39 in) in diameter. Their heat index is between 15,000 and 30,000 Scoville units. The peppers start out green and turn a bright red color as they mature. Chile de árbol peppers can be found fresh, dried, or powdered. As dried chiles, they are often used to decorate wreaths because they do not lose their red color after dehydration.

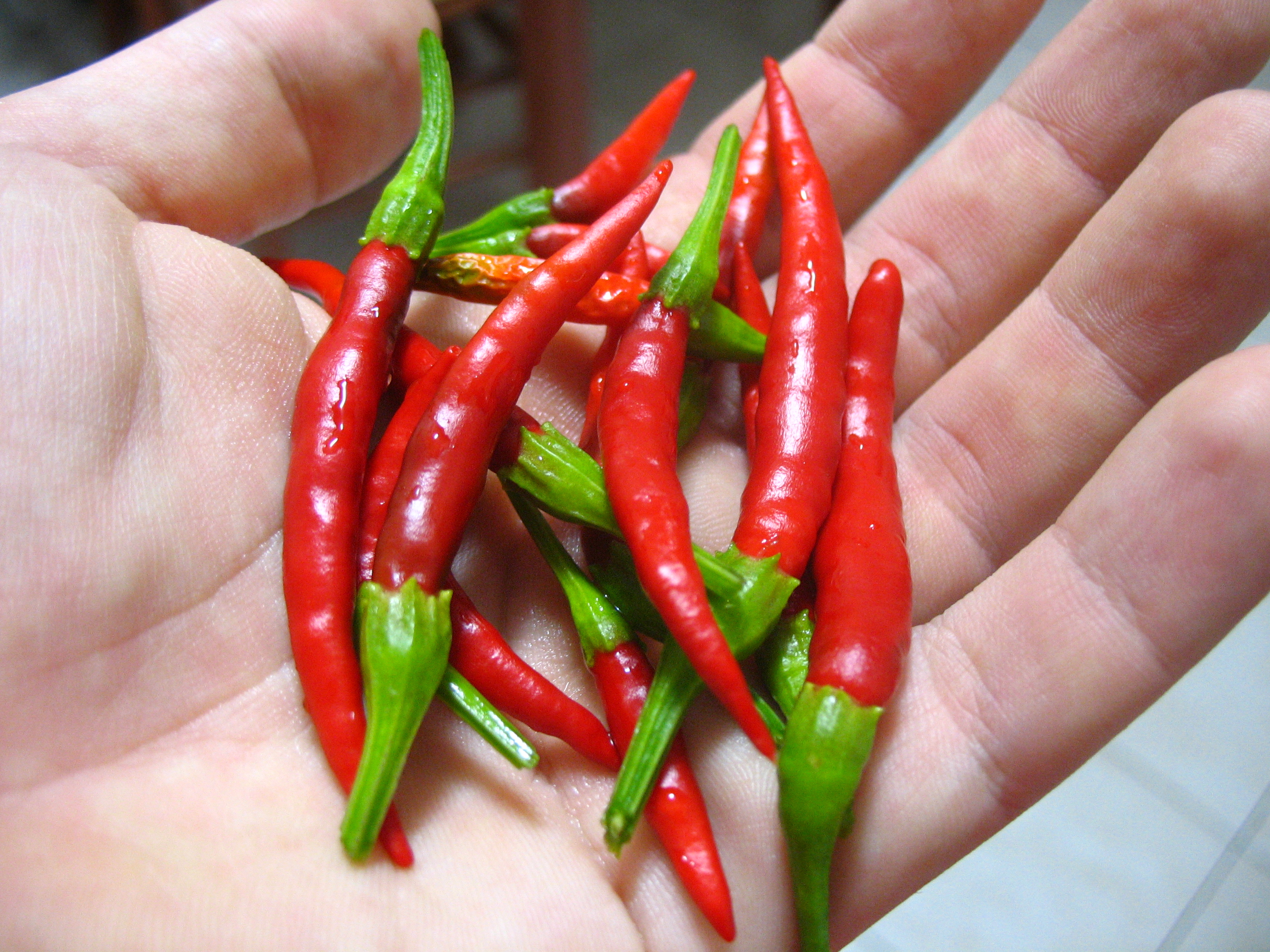
Outdoor-grown chile de árbol peppers

== Cultivation ==
The plant was originally located in the tropical and subtropical regions of North and South America. It grows in a temperature range of 10 °C (54 °F) to 32 °C (90 °F) with an optimal average temperature of around 24 °C (75 °F) . In sandy or clayey soil the plant grows best within a depth of 50 to 150 cm of soil, preferably clay-loam or sandy-loam textures.

== See also ==
- Bird's eye chili
- List of Capsicum cultivars
