= Paul Bosland =

American plant scientist and chile pepper breeder

Paul W. Bosland is an American plant breeder and horticulturist known for his research on chili peppers. A Regents Professor at New Mexico State University (NMSU), he co-founded the university's Chile Pepper Institute and served as its director.

== Career ==
Bosland received a PhD from the University of Wisconsin–Madison in 1985 and joined New Mexico State University, where he developed a research program on the genus Capsicum. In 1992 he co-founded the Chile Pepper Institute, described as the only research center devoted specifically to chile peppers, which grew out of the seed requests his program received.

Bosland has bred and released many chile cultivars, including varieties in NMSU's "NuMex" series, and is co-author, with Eric Votava, of Peppers: Vegetable and Spice Capsicums, a widely used reference work on Capsicum.

In 2007 Bosland and a colleague reported that the bhut jolokia (ghost pepper) of northeastern India exceeded one million Scoville heat units, the hottest chile pepper measured at that time; the result was later recognised by Guinness World Records.

== Selected works ==
- Bosland, Paul W.; Votava, Eric J. (2012). Peppers: Vegetable and Spice Capsicums. CABI.
