= Serrano pepper =

Type of chili pepper

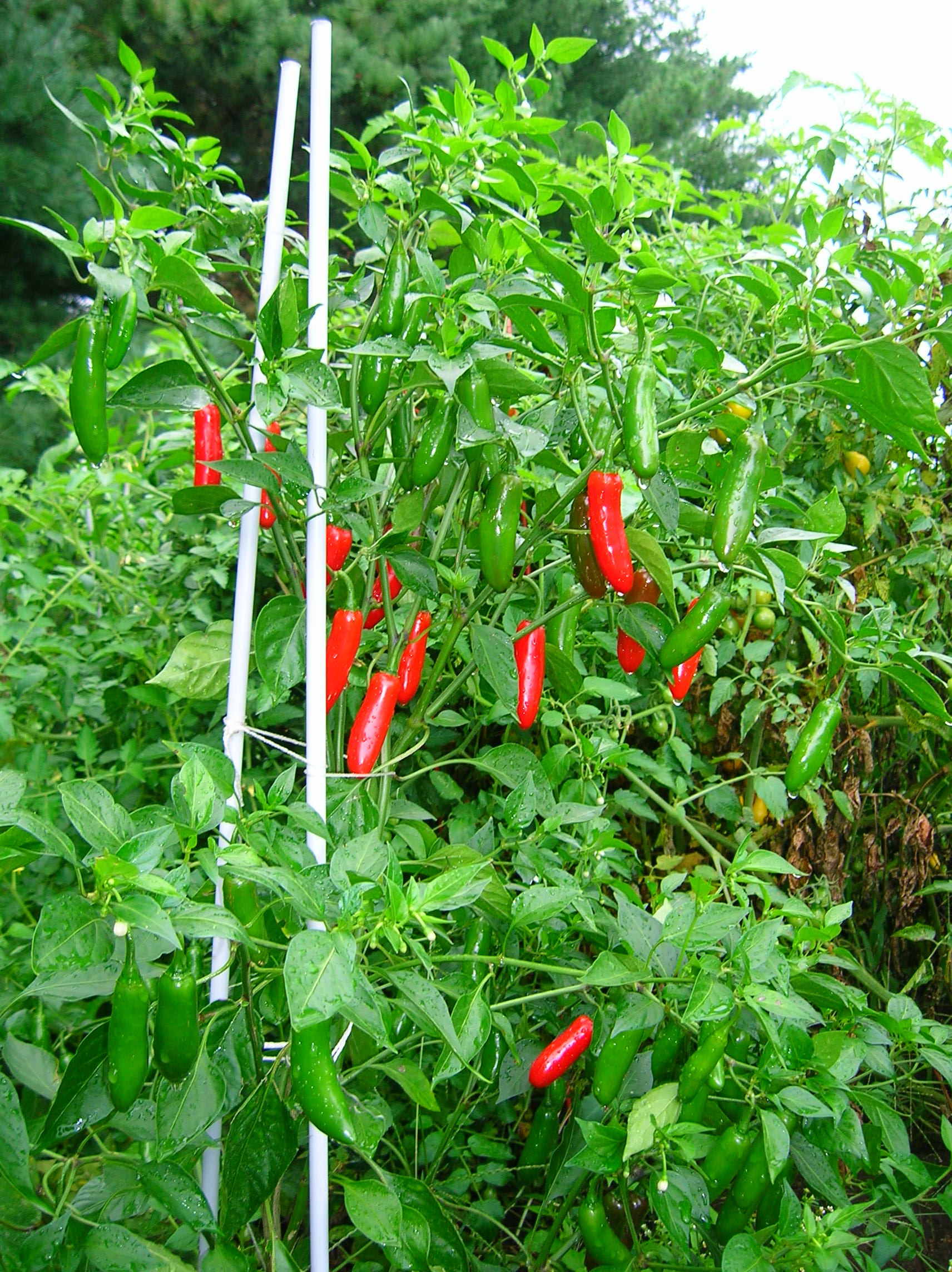
- Serrano pepper plant with red and green fruits
- Species: Capsicum annuum
- Origin: Puebla and Hidalgo Mexico
- Heat: Hot
- Scoville scale: 10,000–25,000 SHU

The serrano pepper (Capsicum annuum) is a type of chili pepper that originated in the mountainous regions of the Mexican states of Puebla and Hidalgo. The Scoville rating of the serrano pepper is 10,000 to 25,000. The name of the pepper is a reference to the mountains (sierras) of these regions. The pepper is commonly used to make hot sauces.

== Serrano plant ==
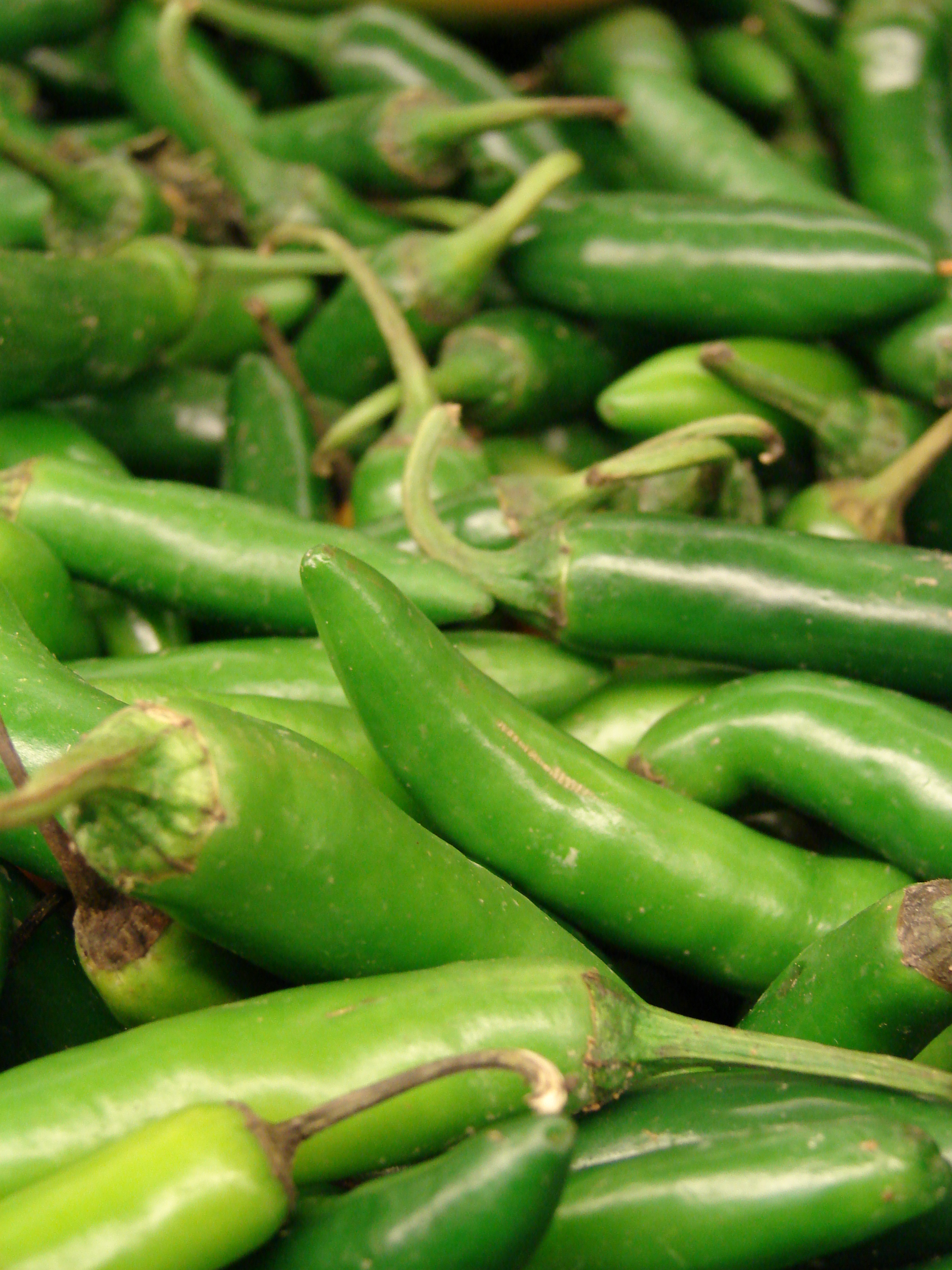
Close-up of unripe serrano peppers

Mature serrano pepper plants reach a height of 0.5–1.5 meters (1 ft 8 in – 4 ft 11 in). Each plant can produce up to 50 pepper berries (not true botanical pods). The fruit can be harvested while they are green or ripe. Unripe serrano peppers are green, but the color varies at maturity; common colors for the ripe fruit are green, red, brown, orange, and yellow. Serrano peppers do better in soils with a pH between 7.0 and 8.5 in warm temperatures above 24 °C (75 °F) and have a low tolerance for frost.

== Serrano fruit ==
Peppers, serrano, raw
Nutritional value per 100 g (3.5 oz)
- Energy: 121 kJ (29 kcal)
- Carbohydrates: 6.70 g
- Sugars: 3.8 g
- Dietary fiber: 3.7 g
- Fat: 0.4 g
- Protein: 1.7 g
Vitamins and minerals
Vitamins	Quantity %DV^{†}
Vitamin A equiv.	5% 47 μg
Thiamine (B1)	5% 0.054 mg
Riboflavin (B2)	6% 0.081 mg
Niacin (B3)	10% 1.537 mg
Vitamin B6	30% 0.505 mg
Folate (B9)	6% 23 μg
Vitamin C	50% 44.9 mg
Vitamin E	5% 0.69 mg
Vitamin K	10% 11.8 μg
Minerals	Quantity %DV^{†}
Calcium	1% 11 mg
Iron	5% 0.86 mg
Magnesium	5% 22 mg
Phosphorus	3% 40 mg
Potassium	10% 305 mg
Sodium	0% 10 mg
Zinc	2% 0.26 mg
- Other constituents: Quantity
- Water: 90.25 g
- Capsaicin: 0.01g – 6 g
- ^{†}Percentages estimated using US recommendations for adults, except for potassium, which is estimated based on expert recommendation from the National Academies.

They are typically eaten raw and have a bright and biting flavor that is notably hotter than the jalapeño pepper. Serrano peppers are also commonly used in making pico de gallo and salsa, as the chili is particularly fleshy compared to others, making it ideal for such dishes.

It is the second most used chili pepper in Mexican cuisine (after jalapeños). The Mexican states of Veracruz, Sinaloa, Nayarit, and Tamaulipas produce about 180,000 tonnes of serranos each year.

== See also ==
- Pickled pepper
