= Mezzetta =

American food company

- Type: Private
- Founder: Giuseppe Luigi Mezzetta
- Headquarters: American Canyon, California, United States
- Area served: California
- Products: olives, pickled peppers, pasta sauces
- Owner: Jeff Mezzetta
- Website: mezzetta.com

G. L. Mezzetta, Inc., commonly known as Mezzetta, is a California food processor that packs olives, pickled peppers and other pickled vegetables in glass jars for retail sale. They also pack and sell wine-based pasta sauces under the Napa Valley Bistro brand name.

The privately held company is headquartered at 105 Mezzetta Ct., American Canyon, California. It occupies a 200,000-square-foot (19,000 m^{2}) plant built in the 1990s in the Green Island Industrial Park at the northern edge of American Canyon. The company selected the location because of the favorable business climate in American Canyon. In 2011, after over a year of negotiation to expand operations with the city, the company indicated that it may move future growth to another state. Mezzetta is among the top ten employers in Napa County.

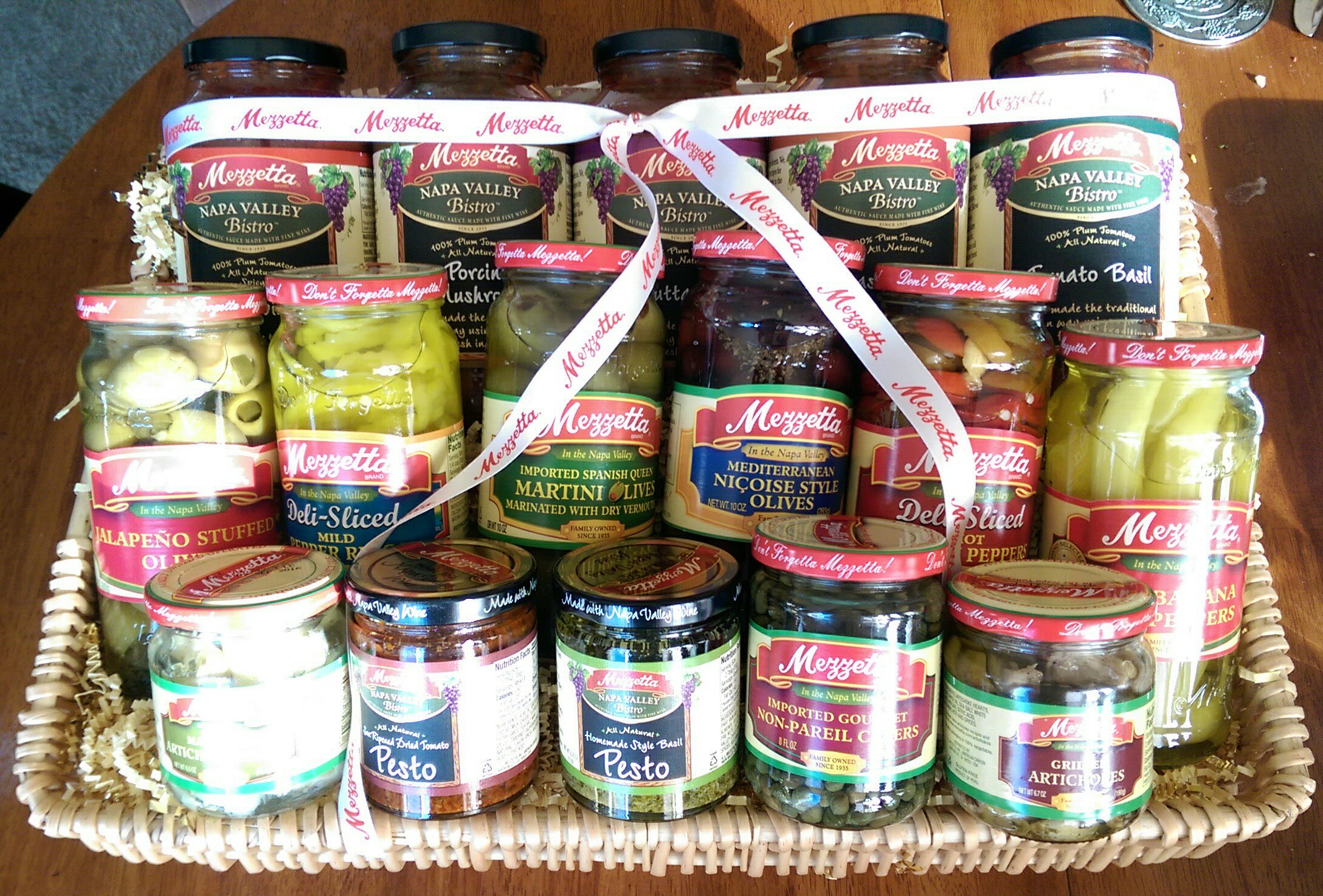
A gift basket of various Mezzetta products

The company was founded in San Francisco by Italian immigrant Giuseppe Luigi Mezzetta and his son Daniel in 1935. Originally, the company distributed imported specialty food items to delicatessens and restaurants in San Francisco. Ron Mezzetta, Daniel's son, began managing the company in 1973. Mezzetta began packaging and distributing its food products for retail sale in 1980. In 1993, Mezzetta purchased Kona Coast Hawaiian Sauces and Marinades. In 1995, the company moved into a new factory in American Canyon, CA. The company is now operated by fourth-generation family member Jeff Mezzetta, who serves as president.

At one time, Mezzetta owned the Tulelake Horseradish brand, but sold that business to Beaverton Foods of Oregon.

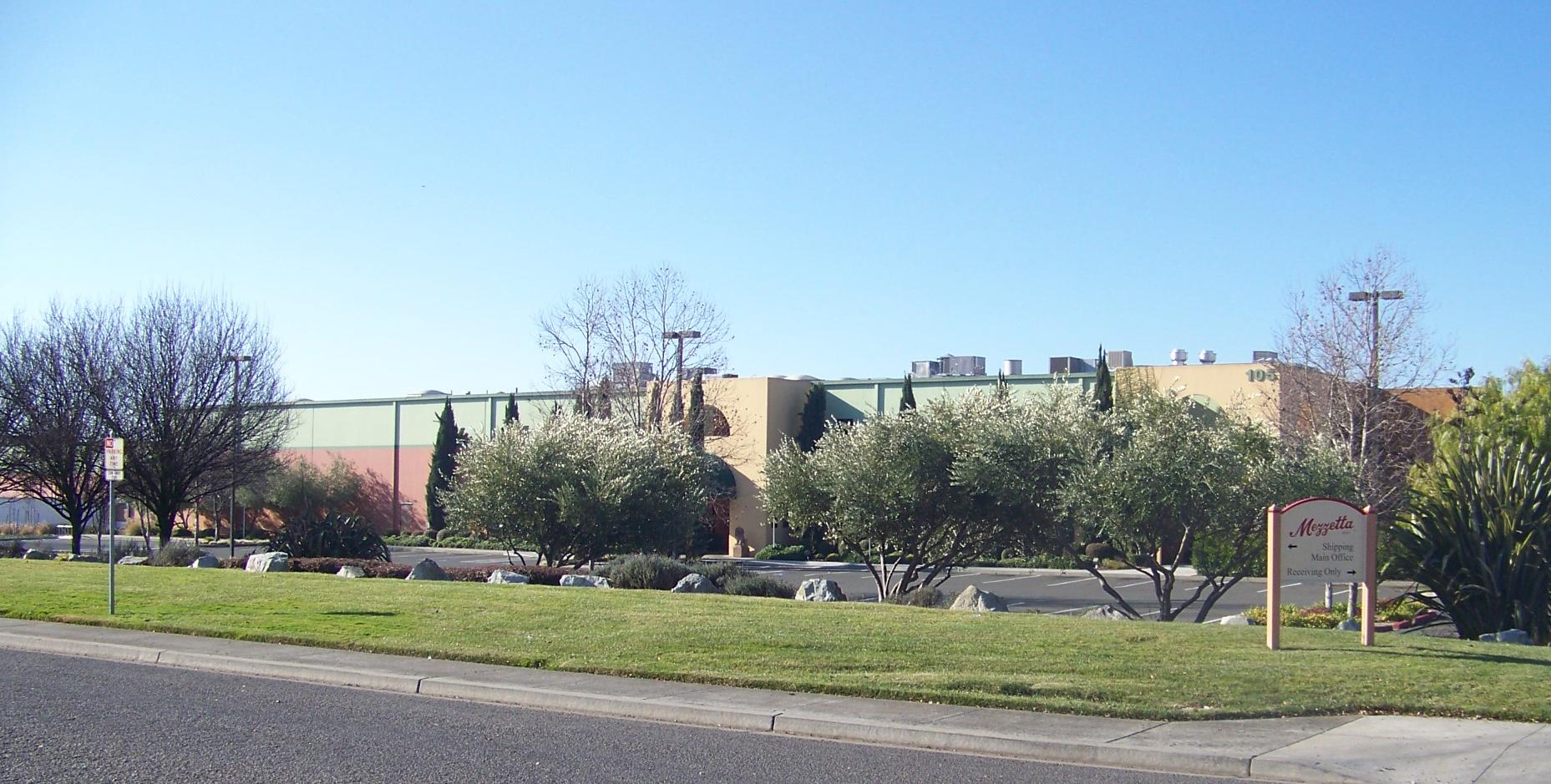
Mezzetta's plant in American Canyon, CA

The company sponsors an annual "Make That Sandwich" recipe contest, awarding a $25,000 first prize.
