= Medusa pepper =

Type of chili pepper

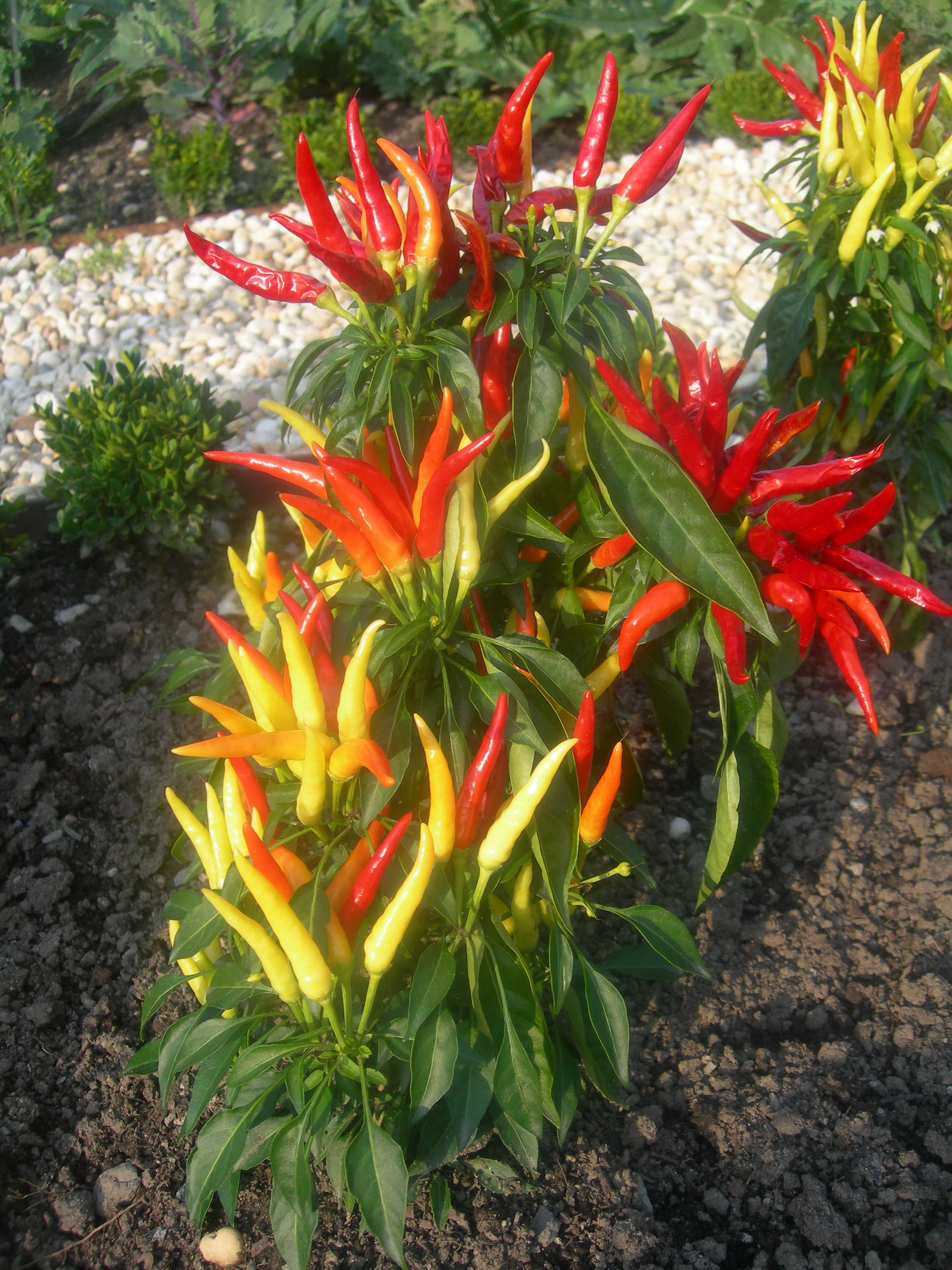
- Genus: Capsicum
- Species: Capsicum annuum
- Heat: Mild
- Scoville scale: 1–1,000 SHU

Medusa peppers are a type of sweet, ornamental chili pepper which grow upright, brightly colored fruit, and which are long and thin, producing a "hair of snakes" look suggestive of the gorgon Medusa in Greek mythology.

Unlike most other ornamental peppers, Medusa peppers are very mild, and typically have a heat level ranging from 1 to 1,000 Scoville heat units. Medusa peppers typically grow to approximately 2 inches (5.1 cm) long, and are often slightly curved in shape. Unusually for ornamental peppers, the fruits are sweet, and transition from green through yellow and orange as they ripen, eventually becoming red when fully ripe.

== See also ==
- List of Capsicum cultivars
