= Cascabel chili =

Mirasol cultivar of the species Capsicum annuum

Cascabel
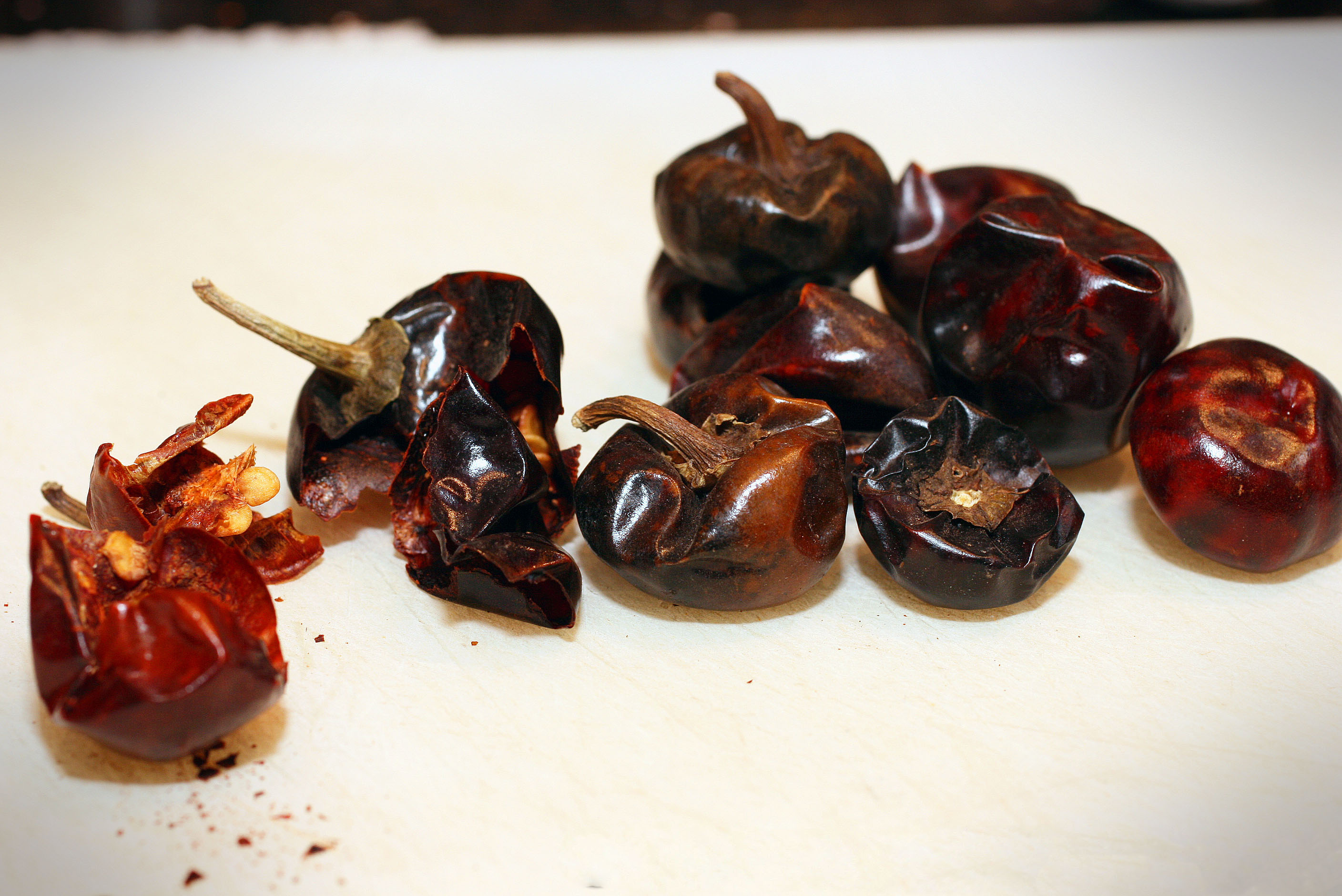
- Dried cascabel chili peppers
- Species: Capsicum annuum
- Cultivar: Cascabel
- Origin: Mexico
- Heat: Low
- Scoville scale: 1,500–2,500 SHU

The cascabel chili (lit. 'little bell'), also known as the rattle chili, is one of the Mirasol cultivars of the species Capsicum annuum. The "rattle" and "bell" designations describe the tendency of loose seeds to rattle inside a dried cascabel when shaken. Fresh cascabel, which is 2–3 cm in diameter, is also known by the alias bola chili or chile bola (Spanish for 'ball chili'). The pigmentation of the fresh chilis blends from green to red; when dried, the color darkens.

The cascabel chili is similar in shape to cherry pepper varieties, but with thinner walls.

Farmers cultivate cascabel in several states throughout Mexico, including Coahuila, Durango, Guerrero, and Jalisco.

Toasted and ground, the cascabel has a nutty, smoky and slightly woody flavour, and is used in table salsas, soups and stews, either rehydrated or as a powder.

== See also ==
- List of Capsicum cultivars
