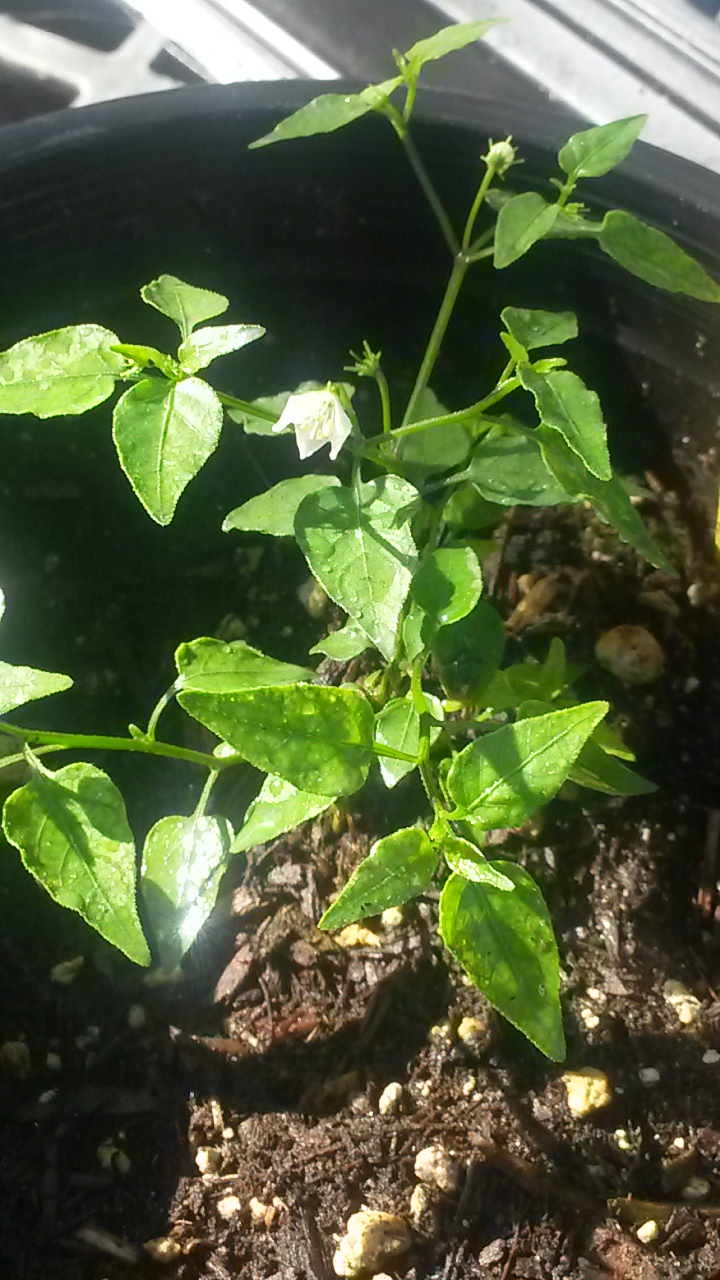

Scientific classification
- Kingdom: Plantae
- Clade: Tracheophytes
- Clade: Angiosperms
- Clade: Eudicots
- Clade: Asterids
- Order: Solanales
- Family: Solanaceae
- Genus: Capsicum
- Species: C. chacoense

Binomial name
- Capsicum chacoense Hunz.

= Capsicum chacoense =

Species of flowering plant

Capsicum chacoense is a species of the genus Capsicum native to South America. While it is rarely cultivated by humans, it, like domesticated Capsicum species, produces edible fruit.

A chili sample morphologically classified as this species appears to be nested within C. baccatum when analyzed through ribosomal DNA internal transcribed spacer.

== Plant characteristics ==
Capsicum chacoense plants are compact perennial (annual in cooler climates) shrubs that grow close to the ground and grow approximately 80 cm and up to 1 meter in height and width. The flowers appear in summer and are small, white flowers with five petals. The fruit, with a roundish/triangular shape, grows to be around 2.5 cm long, 0.5 cm wide when fully ripe, and it matures from green to either yellow or bright red in color. Plants tend to crop heavily each season and in warm areas can easily keep producing for four or five years. The plant's leaves are large, flat, and roundish, with a point at the end. The plant branches evenly, forming a small to medium shrub in most cases.

Capsicum chacoense
- Heat: Variable
- Scoville scale: 0–75,000 SHU

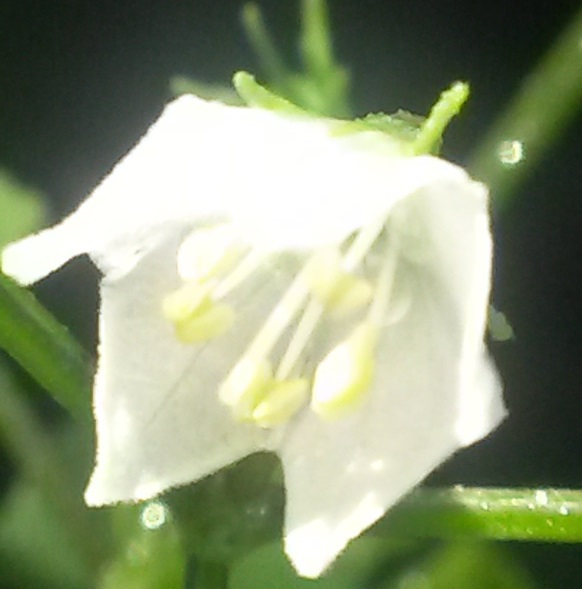

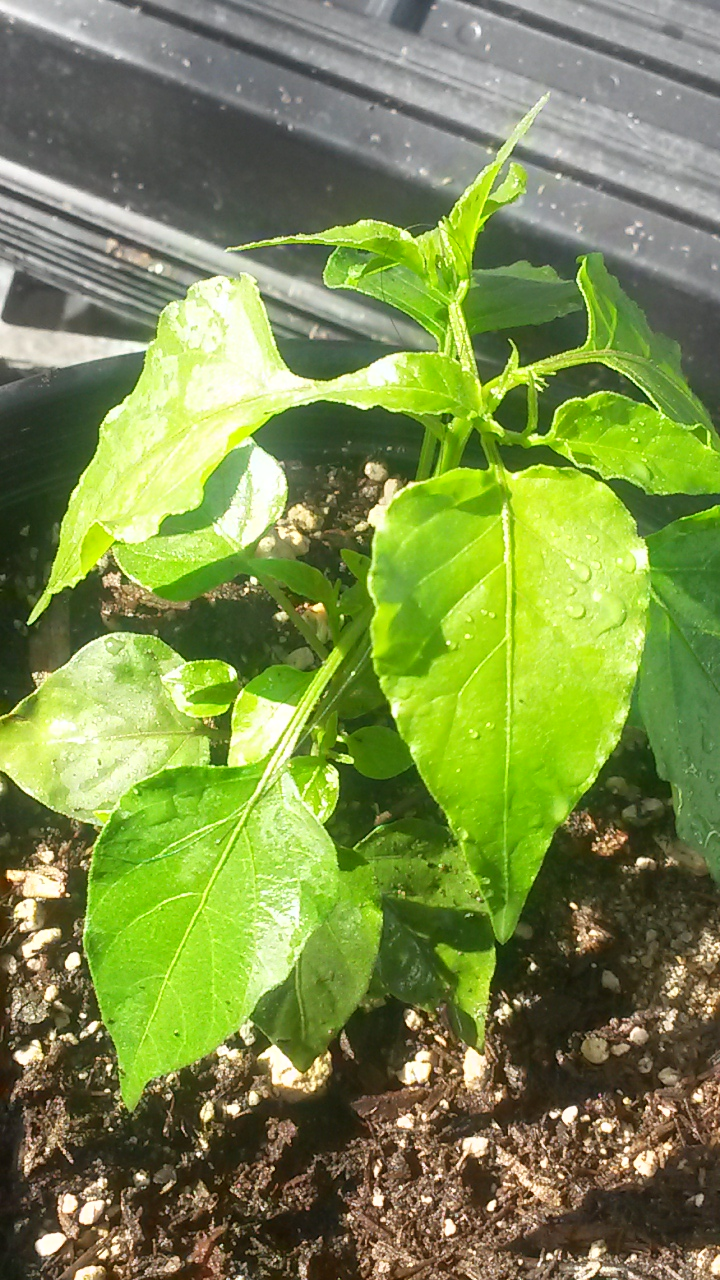

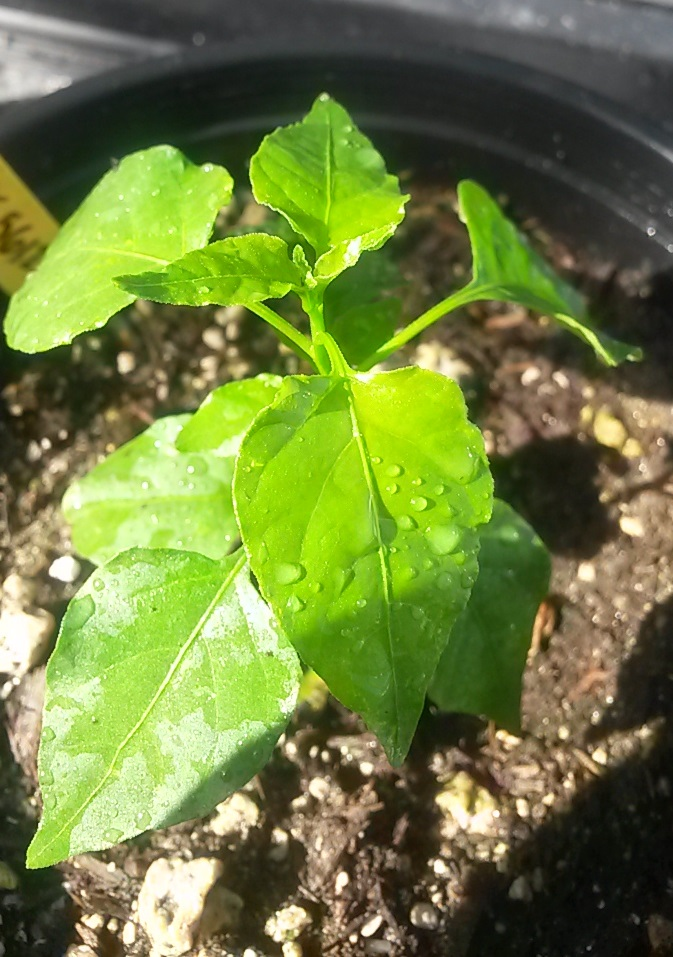

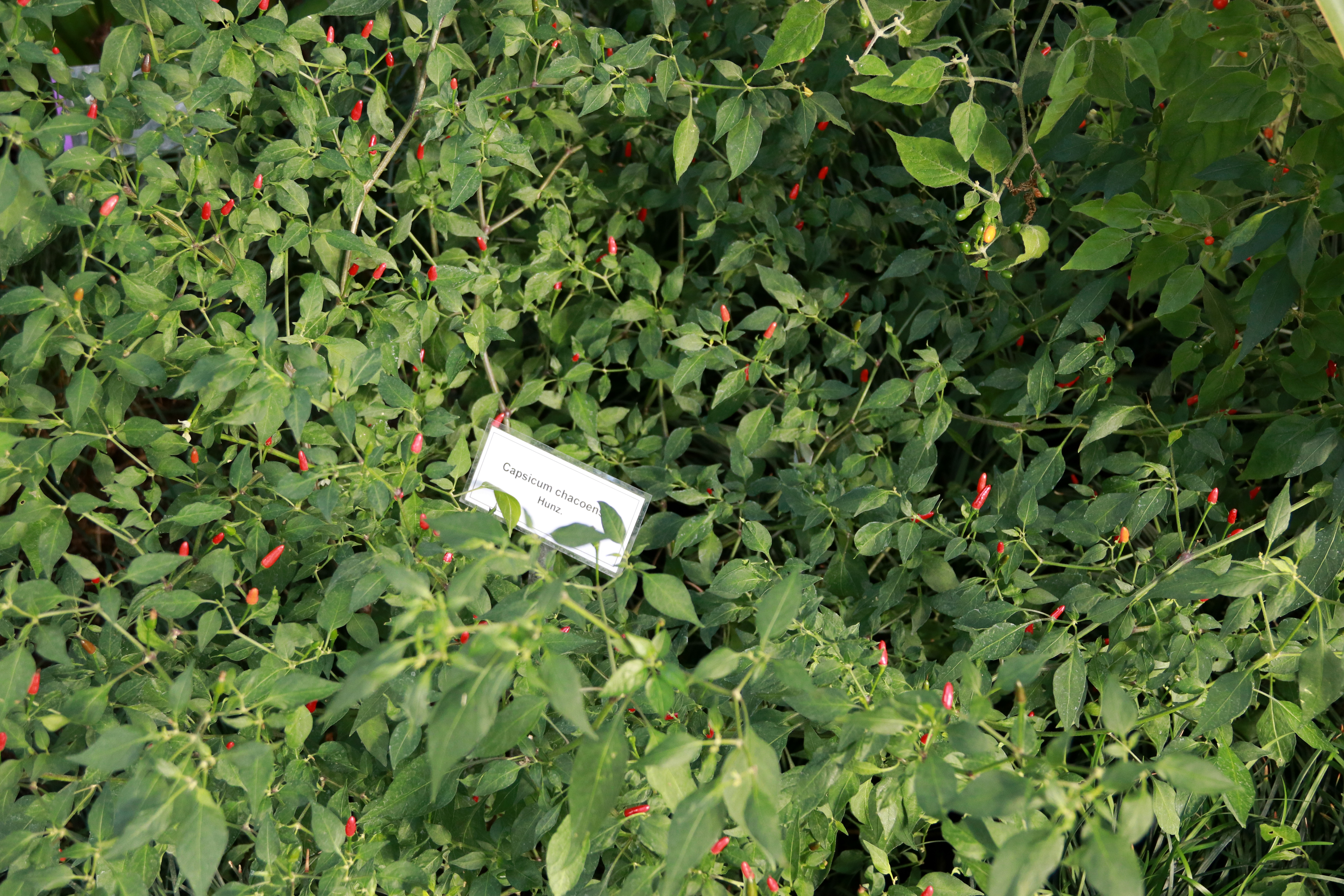

== Synonyms and common names ==
The plant is known locally as Tova or Covincho in Paraguay, ají putaparió in Argentina, and as ají puta madre in Chile. The latter two are related to its heat, often causing people to swear when eating it.

== Distribution ==
C. chacoense is native to the Chaco region of Northern Argentina, the Bolivian Chaco, and Paraguayan Chaco, and for the most part is only known to occur in its native region. It is propagated by seed, which is generally distributed by birds that eat the fruit and distribute it after it has been digested.

== Cultivation and agricultural use ==
This chilli species is sometimes cultivated for food. Also, since it is a wild pepper species, it has been used extensively in phylogenetic studies to better understand the relationships of peppers and different gene models.

== See also ==
- List of Capsicum cultivars
- Capsicum
