= Banana pepper =

Type of chili pepper

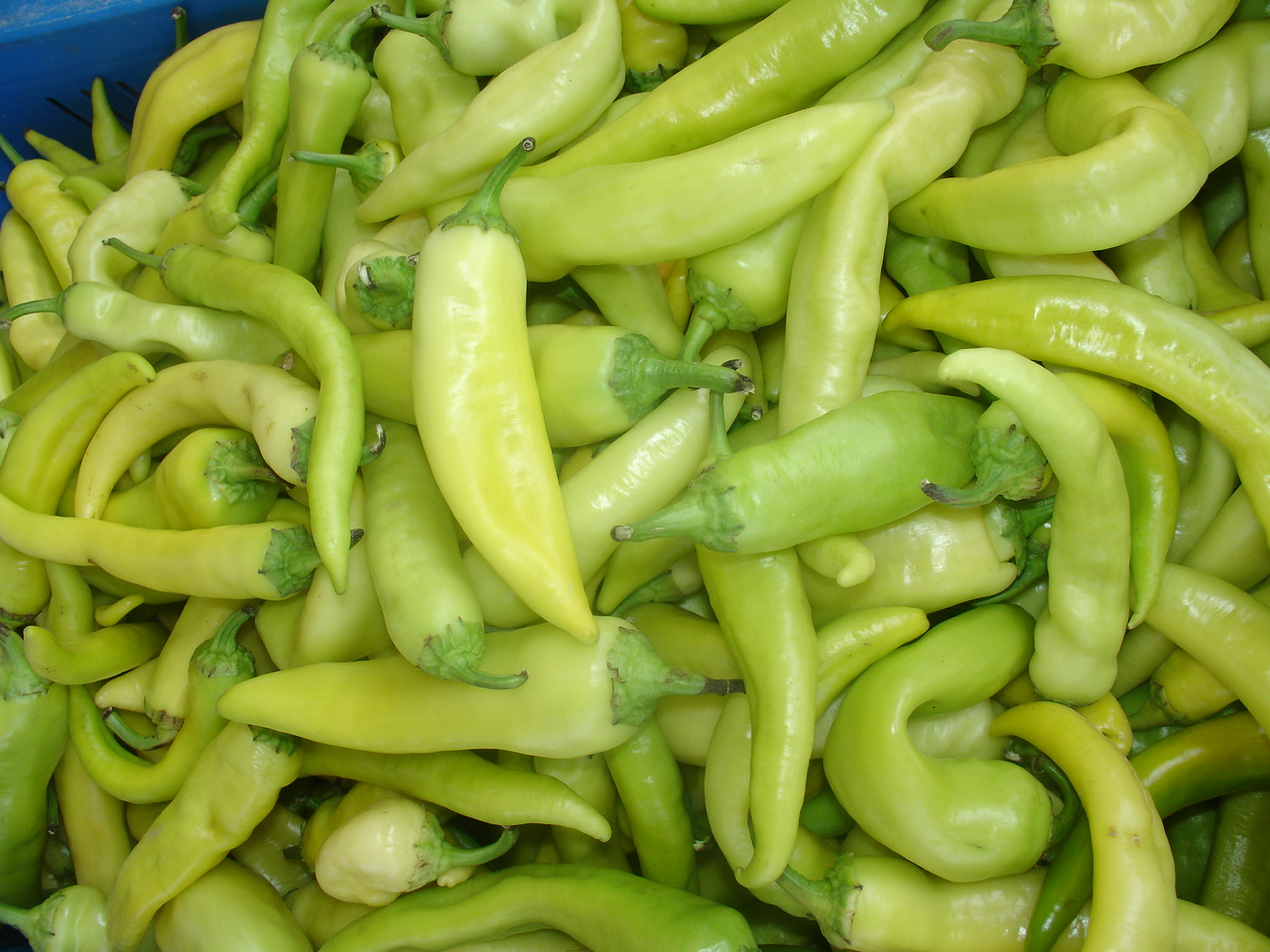
- Armenian banana peppers
- Species: Capsicum annuum
- Heat: Mild
- Scoville scale: 0–500 SHU

The banana pepper (also known as the yellow wax pepper or banana chili) is an average-sized member of the chili pepper family that has a mild, tangy taste. While typically bright yellow, it is possible for them to change to green, red, or orange as they ripen. It is often pickled, stuffed or used as a raw ingredient in foods. It is a cultivar of the species Capsicum annuum. Its flavor is not very hot (0–500 Scoville units) and, as is the case with most peppers, its heat depends on the maturity of the pepper, with the ripest being sweeter than younger ones.

== Nomenclature ==
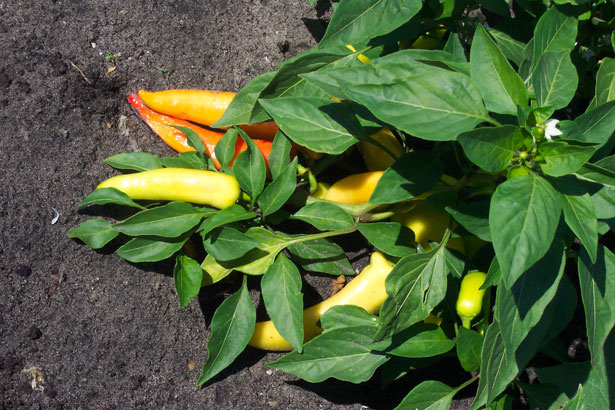
Banana pepper plant

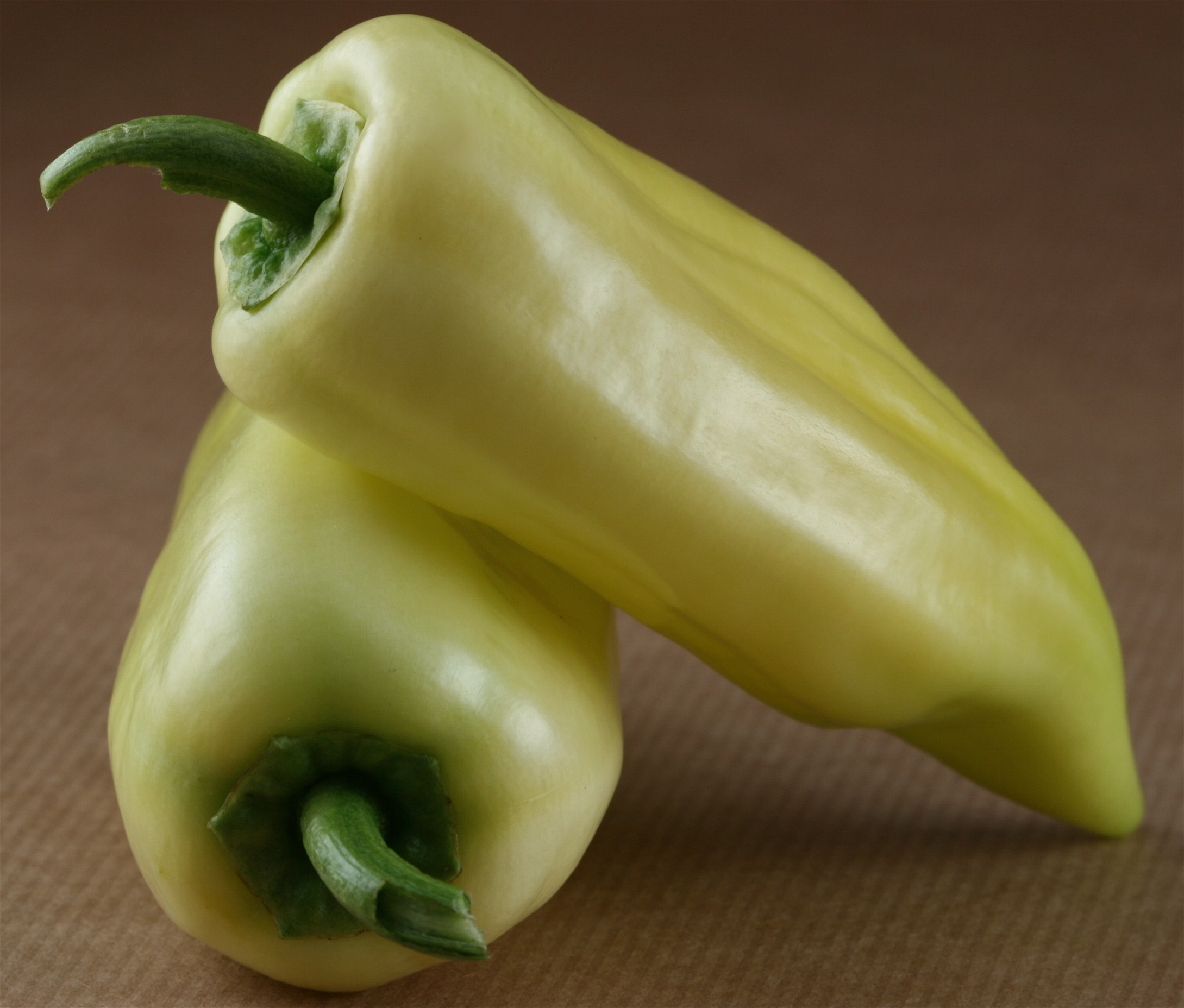
Banana peppers

A mature fruit will be about 2–3 inches (5–8 cm) in length and have a curved shape and yellowish colour similar to a banana, giving rise to the fruit's common name. Friggitelli (pepperoncini) are often erroneously referred to as banana peppers. The hot varieties of banana pepper are called Hungarian wax peppers.

== Cultivation ==
The plant requires full sun, like other Capsicum annuum varieties, and should be treated the same as most other plants in the pepper family. Plants can be grown from seed and cuttings. A mature plant will reach 1 to 2 feet (30 to 61 cm) tall and can be grown in many climates, but prefers warmer climates. Cultivars include Early Sweet Banana, Hungarian Yellow Wax, Long Sweet Yellow, Sweet Banana, and Sweet Hungarian.

== Nutritional information ==
Pepper, banana, raw
Nutritional value per 100 g
- Energy: 113 kJ (27 kcal)
- Carbohydrates: 5.3 g
- Sugars: 1.9 g
- Dietary fiber: 3.4 g
- Fat: .5 g
- Polyunsaturated: .2 g
- Protein: 1.7 g
Vitamins and minerals
Vitamins	Quantity %DV^{†}
Vitamin A equiv. beta-Carotene	2% 17 μg 2% 184 μg
Thiamine (B1)	8% 0.1 mg
Riboflavin (B2)	4% 0.05 mg
Niacin (B3)	8% 1.2 mg
Pantothenic acid (B5)	5% 0.27 mg
Vitamin B6	21% 0.36 mg
Folate (B9)	7% 29 μg
Vitamin C	92% 82.7 mg
Minerals	Quantity %DV^{†}
Calcium	1% 14 mg
Iron	3% 0.5 mg
Magnesium	4% 17 mg
Manganese	4% 0.1 mg
Phosphorus	3% 32 mg
Potassium	9% 256 mg
Zinc	3% 0.3 mg
- Other constituents: Quantity
- Water: 91.8 g
- ^{†}Percentages estimated using US recommendations for adults, except for potassium, which is estimated based on expert recommendation from the National Academies.

Raw banana peppers contain 92% water, 5% carbohydrates, and negligible fat and protein (table). They are rich sources of vitamin C, containing 92% of the Daily Value (DV) in a 100 gram reference amount (table). Vitamin B6 is present in substantial content of 21% DV, with no other micronutrients in appreciable amounts (table).

== Uses ==
=== Culinary ===
- Pickled banana peppers are commonly sold sliced and used to garnish pizzas, sandwiches and Greek salads.
- Pickled and stuffed banana peppers are common inclusions on antipasto bars filled with prosciutto and/or cheese.
- Stuffed banana peppers are served warm with a variety of Italian sausage and cheeses.
- Chopped or diced banana peppers are used in many relishes and salsas to add sweetness with other peppers providing heat.
- Banana peppers may be jellied along with other hot green peppers such as jalapeños.
- Bhaji, a snack food.

== See also ==
- List of Capsicum cultivars
