= Cherry pepper =

Chili pepper of the species Capsicum annum

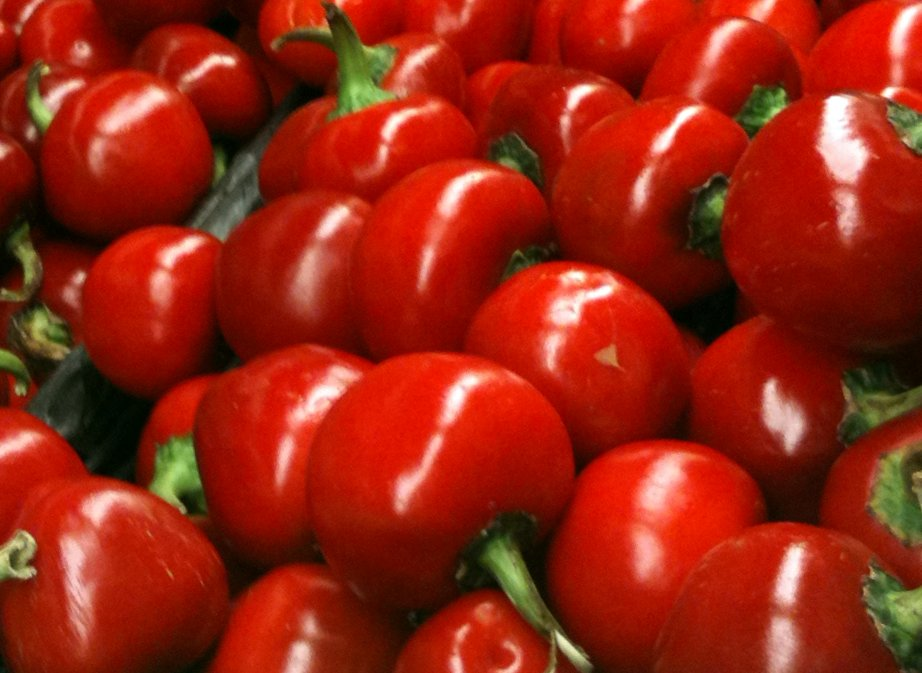
- Species: Capsicum annuum

The cherry pepper is type of a chili pepper of the species Capsicum annuum. They vary in spice level, with both sweet and spicy cultivars. Immature cherry pepper pods are green, turning red upon reaching maturity.

== In Hungary ==
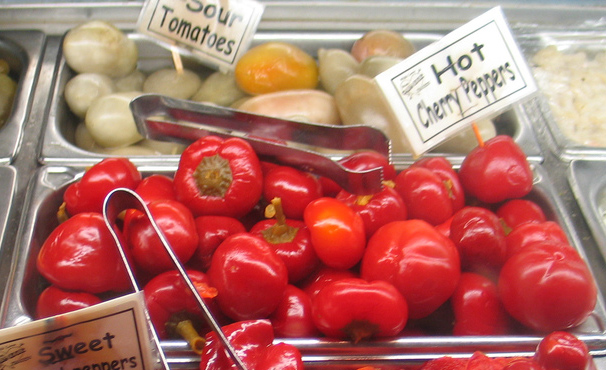
Pickled cherry peppers

The cherry pepper (Hungarian: cseresznyepaprika, lit. 'cherry chili') is a popular variant of pepper in Hungary. It was traditionally stored in a bundle or tied in a ball in a window. It is also kept as an ornamental plant. They are often used in traditional Hungarian dishes including csalamádé, pörkölt, halászlé, and they are made into Paprika.

Kalocsai, Szentesi, and the large Cseresznye varieties of the cherry pepper are local specialities exported from the Kalocsa and Szentes regions.

== See also ==
- List of Capsicum cultivars
- Hungarian cuisine
