= Bird's eye chili =

Variety of chili pepper

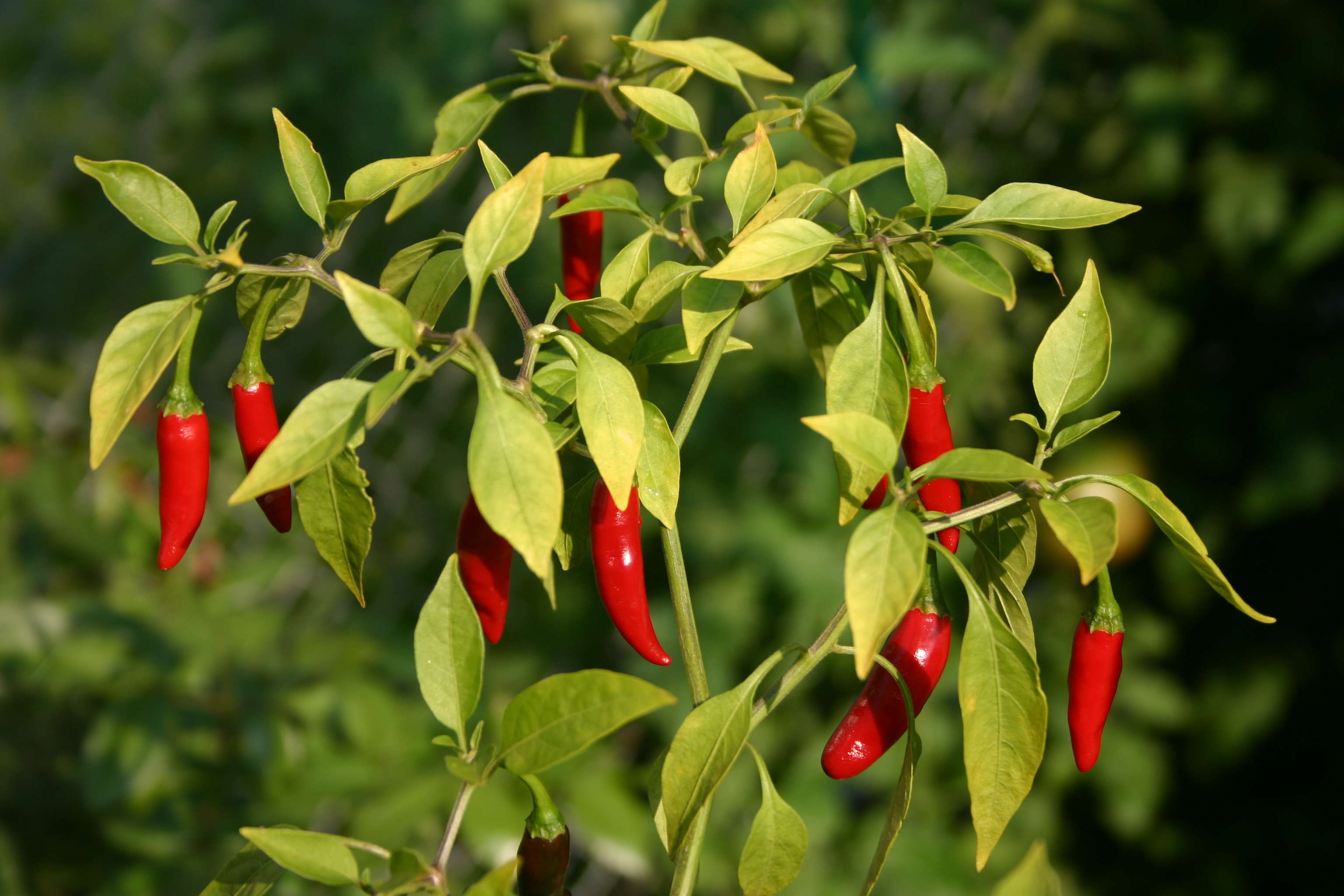
- Several bird's eye chilis on a shrub
- Species: Capsicum annuum
- Cultivar: Bird's Eye
- Heat: Very hot
- Scoville scale: 50,000 - 250,000 SHU

Bird's eye chili or Thai chili (Thai: พริกขี้หนู, romanized: phrik khi nu, lit. 'mouse-dropping chili' owing to its shape) is a chili pepper variety from the species Capsicum annuum that is native to Mexico. Cultivated across Southeast Asia, it is used extensively in many Asian cuisines. It may be mistaken for a similar-looking chili derived from the species Capsicum frutescens, the cultivar siling labuyo. Capsicum frutescens fruits are generally smaller and characteristically point upwards. In the Marianas and Guam, these are often called boonie peppers or Doni Sali, which can be a term for regional wild (technically feral) varieties. The variation between different varieties can be significant for regional dishes or visuals, such as the Thai ornamental varieties.

== Description ==
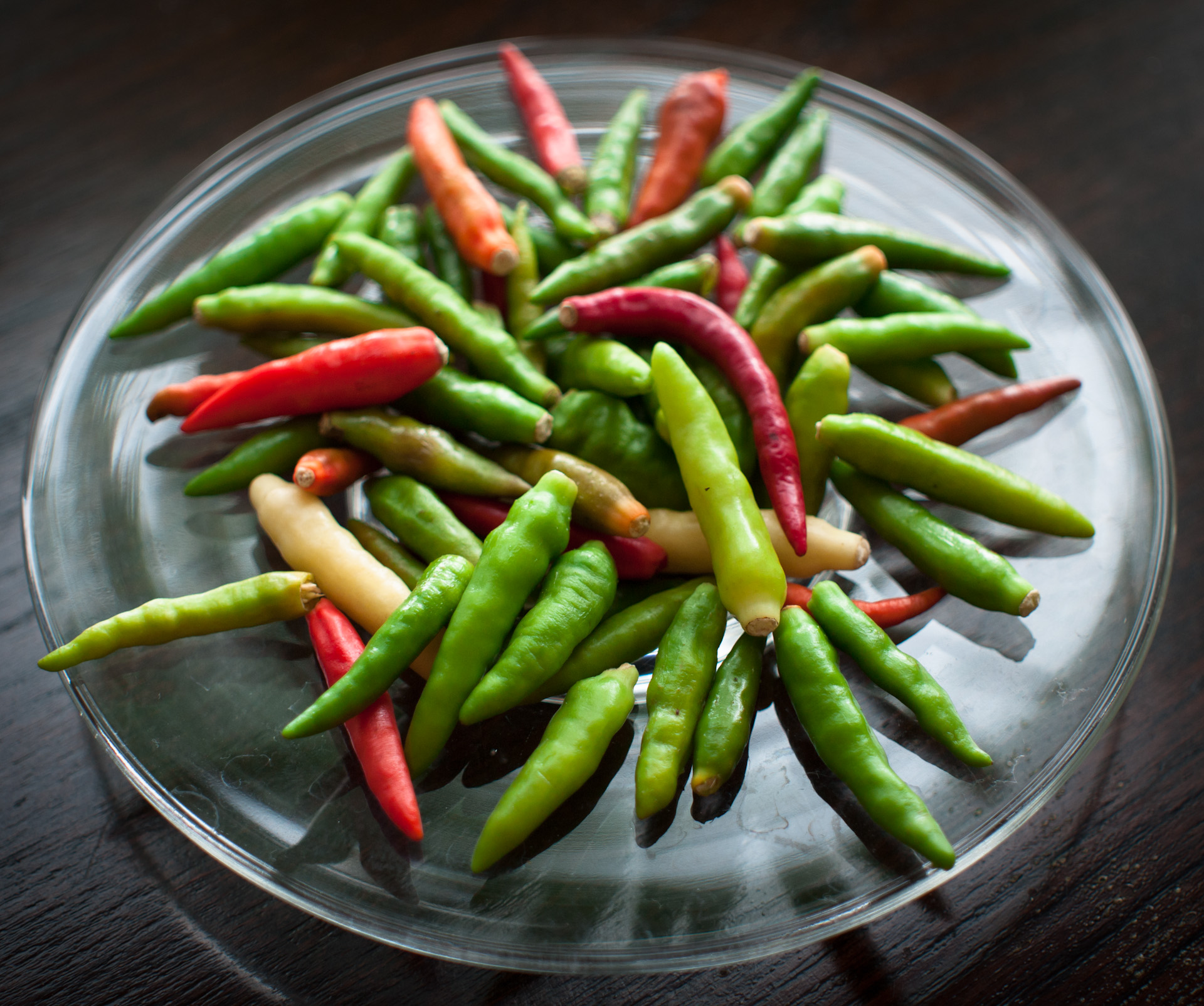
Bird's eye chilis of assorted colors

The bird's eye chili plant is a perennial with small, tapering fruits, often two or three, at a node. The fruits are very pungent.

The bird's eye chili is small, but is quite hot. It measures around 50,000 – 100,000 Scoville units, which is less than a habanero, but many times hotter than the spiciest jalapeños.

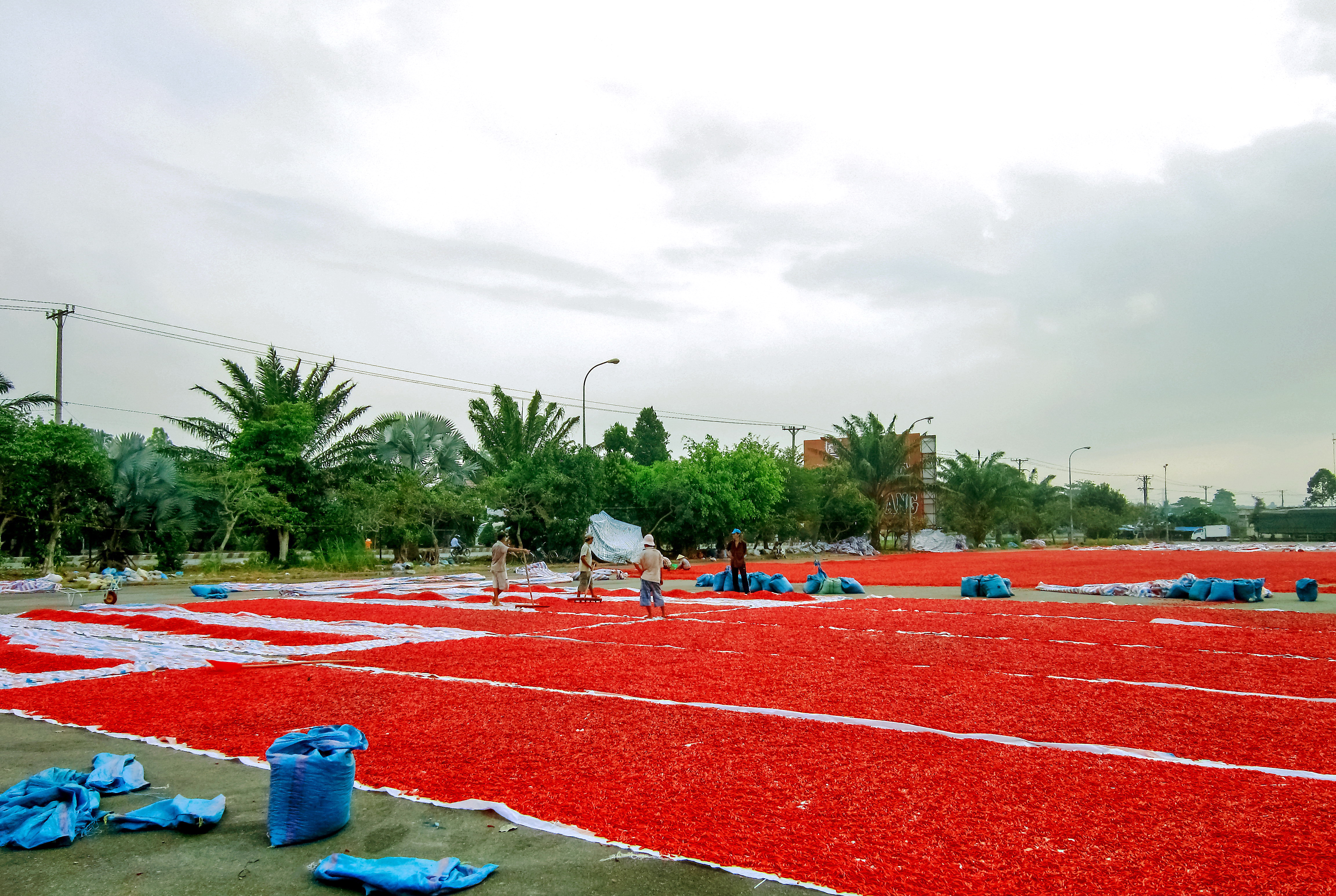
Commercial-scale drying of chilis in Vietnam

== Origins ==
All chilis found around the world today have their origins in Mexico, Central America, and South America. They were spread by Spanish and Portuguese colonists, missionaries, and traders, together with many other now-common crops, such as maize, tomatoes and pineapples, through the Columbian Exchange. The chili varieties found in Southeast Asia today were brought there in the 16th or 17th centuries.

== Uses ==
=== Cooking ===
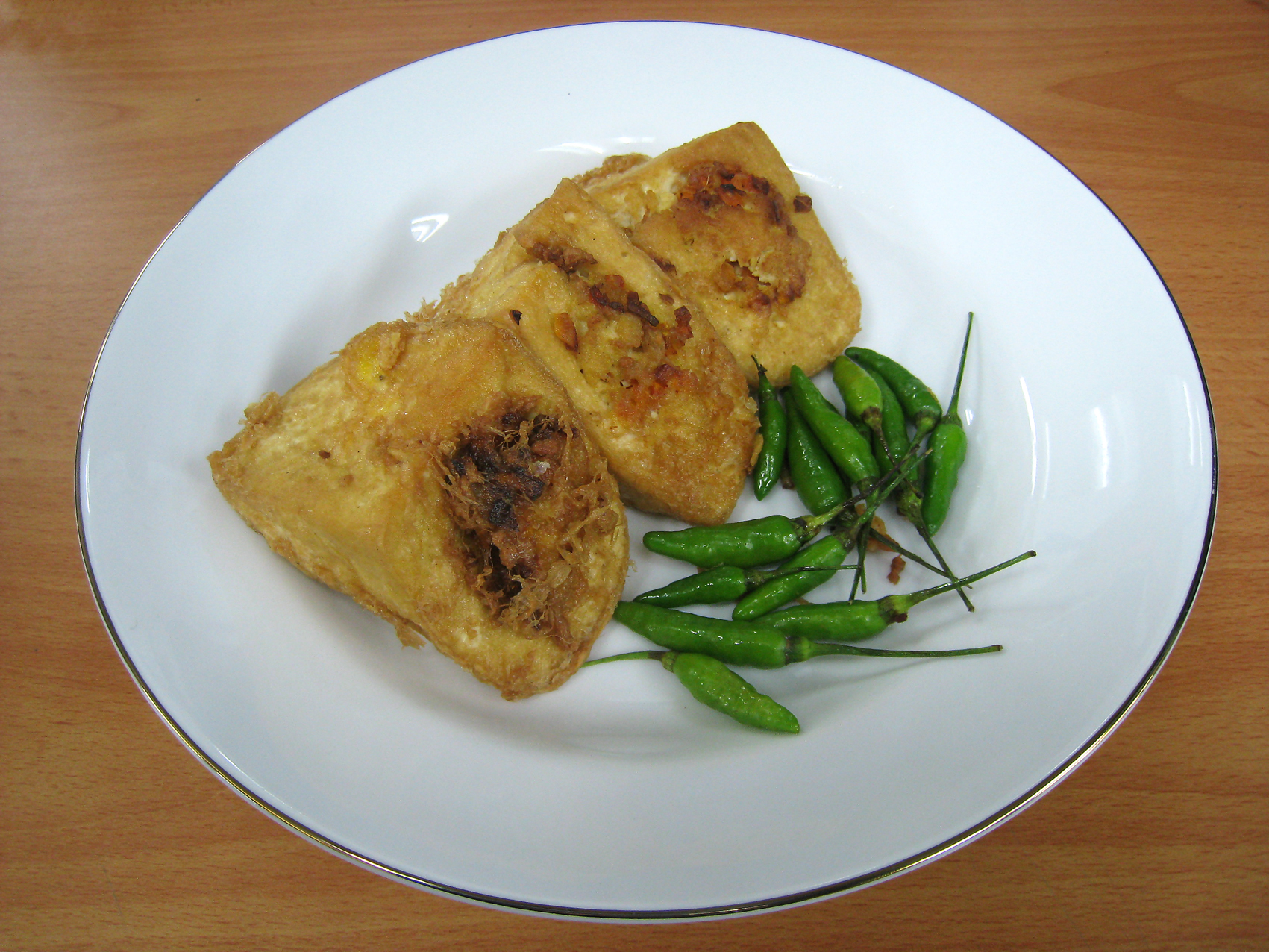
Tahu isi (tofu fritter) with green bird's eye chili locally called cabai rawit is a popular snack in Indonesia

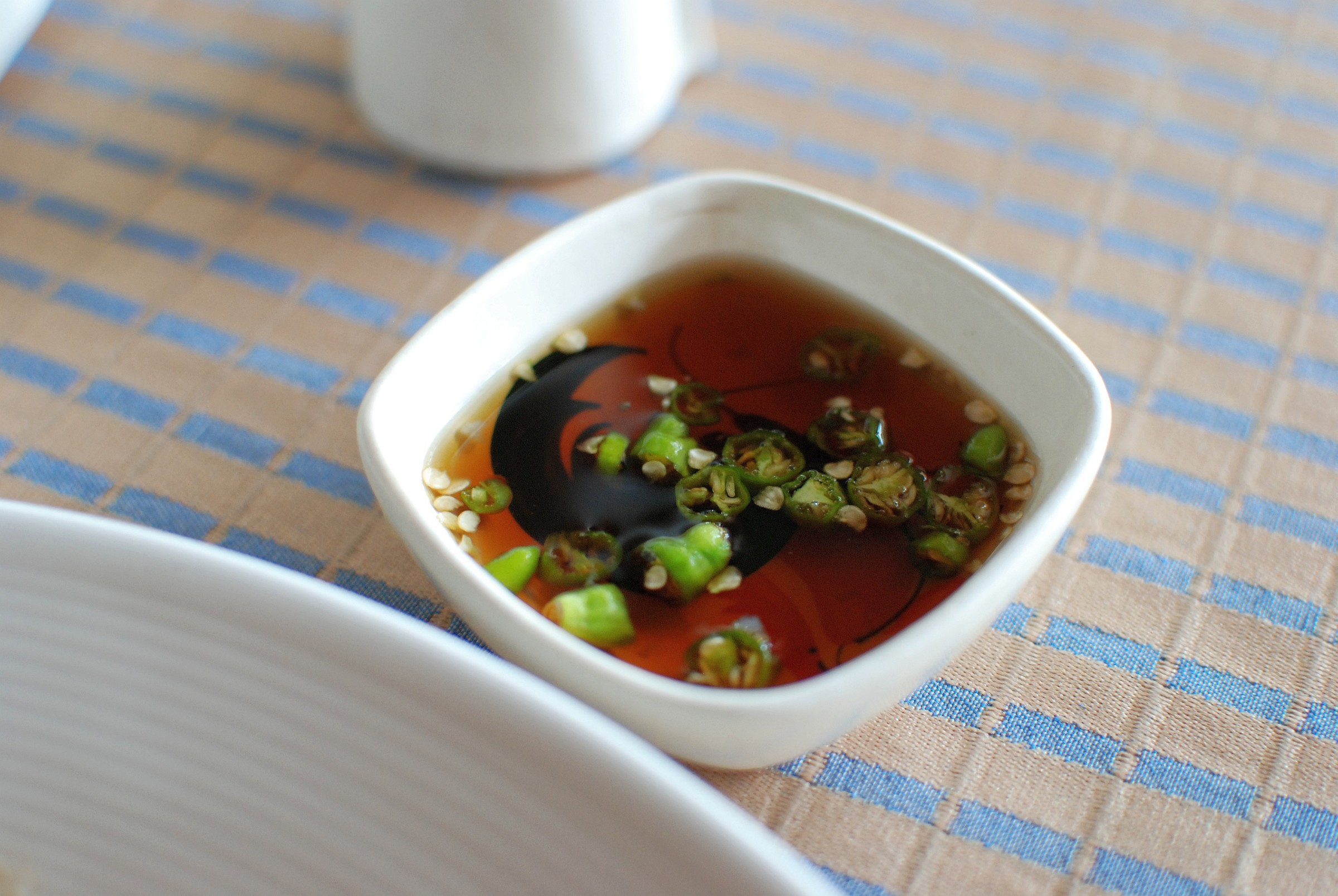
Bird's eye chili with fish sauce and lime juice is served with a multitude of Thai dishes.

In Indonesian cuisine, these chilis are widely used in a variety of dishes and sambals. The whole green bird's eye chili is also eaten raw as a side dish for gorengan (deep-fried foods).

In Vietnamese cuisine, these chilis are used in soups, salads, and stir-fried dishes. They are also put in a wide variety of sauces, pastes, and marinades, used as a condiment or eaten raw, both fresh and dried.

In Thai cuisine, these chilis are highly valued for their fruity taste and extreme spiciness. They are extensively used in many Thai dishes, such as in Thai curries and in Thai salads, green as well as the ripe red chilis; or they can just be eaten raw on the side, with for instance, khao kha mu (stewed pork trotter served with rice).

In Indian cuisine, it is primarily used across South Indian cuisine (notably in Kerala and coastal Karnataka), where it is known as Kanthari or Gandhari chili. It is used for chutneys, curries and broths, meat and seafood dishes, preserves and pickles, beverages and is also used to make a special type of icecream.

=== Thai ornamentals ===
The more decorative, but slightly less pungent chili, sometimes known as "Thai ornamental", has peppers that point upward on the plant, and range from green to yellow, orange, and then red. It is the basis for the hybrid cultivar 'NuMex Twilight', essentially the same, but less pungent, and starting with purple fruit, creating a rainbow effect. These peppers can grow wild in places such as Saipan and Guam.

== See also ==
- Bird's beak chile, also known as chile de árbol
- Capsicum frutescens
- List of Capsicum cultivars
