= Chile Pepper Institute =

International research-based organization

- Founded: 1992; 34 years ago
- Location: Las Cruces, New Mexico, U.S.
- Coordinates: 32.2806°N 106.7575°W
- Website: cpi.nmsu.edu

The Chile Pepper Institute at New Mexico State University in Las Cruces, New Mexico, United States, is an international research-based and non-profit organization specializing in research, education and archiving information related to Capsicum or chile peppers. The institute was established in 1992 and is devoted to research and education about chile peppers. Its research facility is named for Fabián García, a Mexican-American horticulturalist dubbed "the father of the U.S. chile pepper industry", who began standardizing varieties of chile pepper in 1888.

== Overview ==
The Chile Pepper Institute is a research institute and is the only international organization that is devoted to the research, resource, and education of chile peppers. The institute promotes chile peppers. CPI is located in Las Cruces, New Mexico, on the campus of New Mexico State University, and research is conducted at the Fabian Garcia Horticultural Center, where it also showcases 100–200 varieties of chile pepper from around the world. Paul W. Bosland is the current director and the co-founder of The Chile Pepper Institute, who is also a professor of horticulture at New Mexico State University, where he leads the chile breeding and genetics research program.

The Chile Pepper Institute is responsible for discovering the then world's hottest chile pepper, the Bhut Jolokia, led by Paul W. Bosland, and confirmed by the Guinness World Records in the Fall of 2006. Many interesting records about chile peppers are discovered at the Chile Pepper Institute including the world's largest chile pepper, the Numex Big Jim specimen, that was developed in 1976 at NMSU, and the recently released specimen chile pepper, NuMex Heritage 6-4, which is five times the flavor of a standard green chile. CPI also host different programs, events and conferences in local, national, and international levels. These include:

- The Annual New Mexico Chile Conference
- European Association for Plant Breeding Research (EUCARPIA)
- Chile Pepper Institute Teaching Garden
- The Annual Chile Conference
- The International Pepper Conference
- Agricultural Science Summer Undergraduate Research Education and Development Program (ASSURED Program)

== Cultivars ==
The Chile Pepper Institute produces numerous pepper cultivars in unusual colors and shapes, such as the NuMex Twilight, a hybrid based on the Thai Ornamental pepper. The peppers of the Twilight start out white, turn purple, then move through yellow and orange, becoming red when fully ripe, producing a rainbow effect on the green plant. Other varieties, such as the NuMex Centennial and NuMex Easter move through other color ranges. The NuMex April Fools' Day cultivar has bundles of purple peppers which point upward, resembling a jester hat.

== See also ==
- Paul Bosland
- World Vegetable Center
