= Bell pepper =

Group of fruits of Capsicum annuum

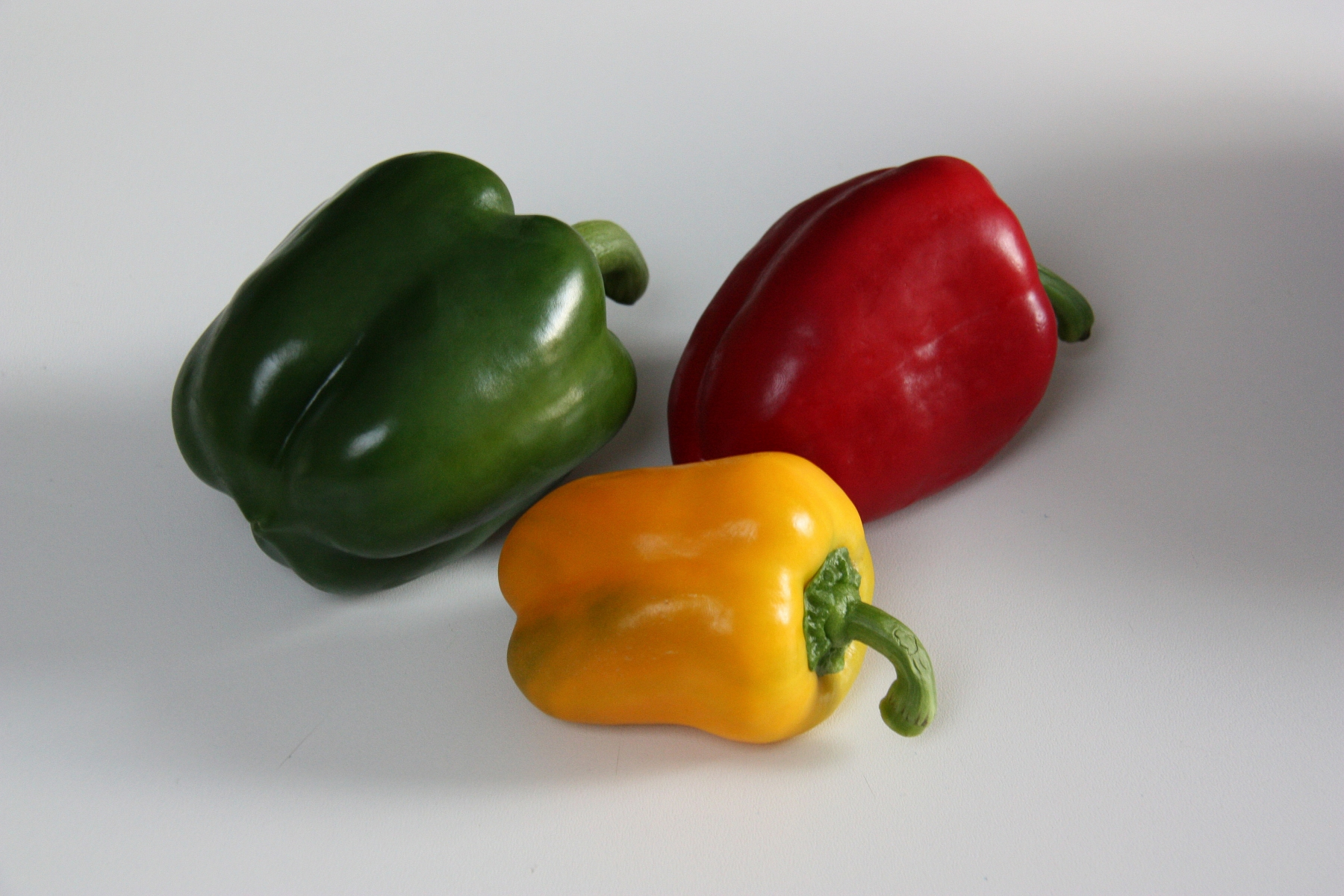
- Green, yellow, and red bell peppers on a grey background.
- Species: Capsicum annuum
- Heat: None
- Scoville scale: 0 SHU

The bell pepper (also known as sweet pepper, paprika, pepper, capsicum /ˈkæpsɪkəm/ or, in some parts of the U.S. Midwest, mango) is the fruit of plants in the Grossum Group of the species Capsicum annuum. Cultivars of the plant produce fruits in different colors, including red, yellow, orange, green, white, and purple. Bell peppers are sometimes grouped with less pungent chili varieties as "sweet peppers". While they are botanically fruits—classified as berries—they are commonly used as a vegetable ingredient or side dish. Other varieties of the genus Capsicum are categorized as chili peppers when they are cultivated for their pungency, including some varieties of Capsicum annuum.

Peppers are native to Mexico, Central America, the Caribbean and northern South America. Pepper seeds were imported to Spain in 1493 and then spread through Europe and Asia. Preferred growing conditions for bell peppers include warm, moist soil in a temperature range of 21 to 29 °C (70 to 84 °F).

== History ==
Peppers are native to Mexico, Central America, the Caribbean and northern South America. Capsicum originated in Bolivia and Brazil, being transported to Mesoamerica and the Caribbean before the arrival of Europeans. In Mesoamerica, it was domesticated and C. annuum became the parent to the cayenne, bell, jalapeño, and tabasco peppers.

Pepper seeds were spread all through the globe; Spain by 1493, the East Indies by 1540, and India by 1542, where they became staples for many cuisines and cultures. Peppers are one of the oldest domesticated crops based on findings in caves in Mexico, Peru, and Ecuador, suggesting that the species was being used around 7,000 years ago. The Spanish introduced peppers to Europe, but the Portuguese played the primary role in their spread to Africa, India, and Southeast Asia.

== Nomenclature ==
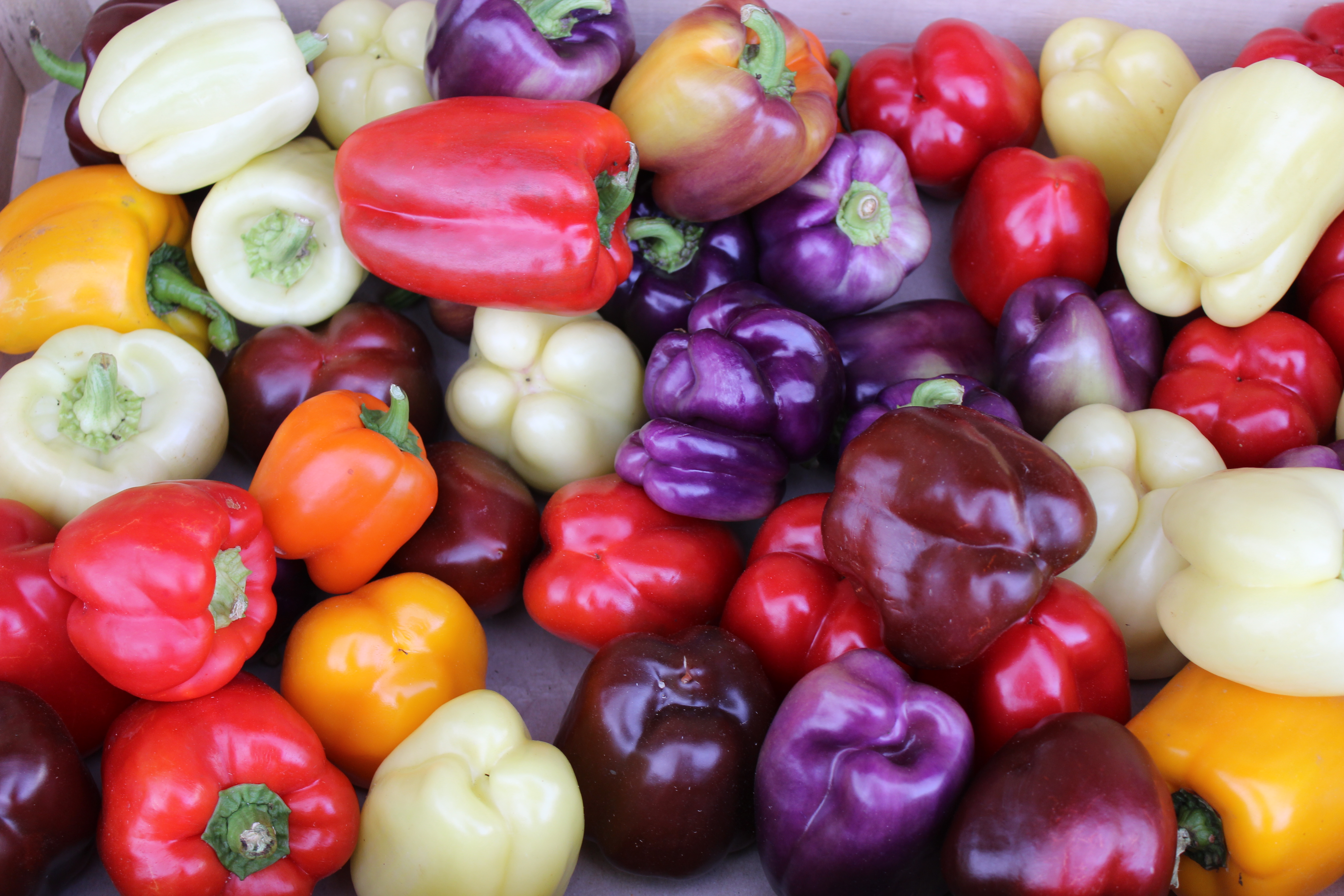
A variety of colored bell peppers

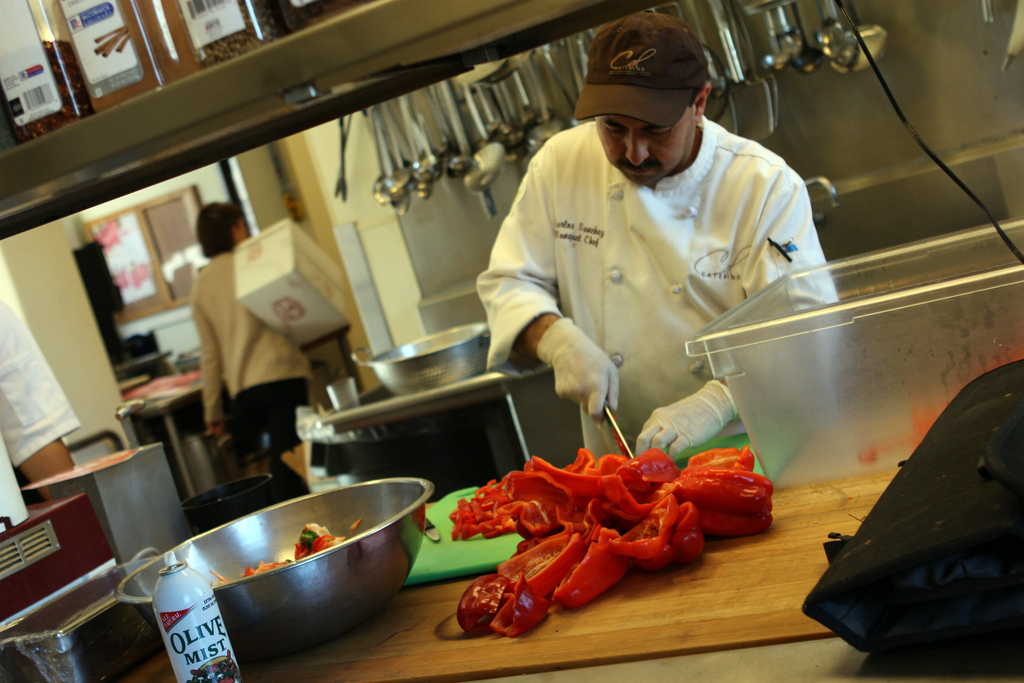
Chef chopping bell peppers

The word ‘pepper’ is derived from the Sanskrit word pippali meaning "long pepper." As it was traded, the Ancient Greeks called it πέπερι or péperi, and then it entered latin as piper. That latin word was borrowed from Germanic languages and in Old English became piper, before evolving into peper. The name Capsicum can be tied to both Greek and Latin. The Greek word kapto meaning “to bite,” and the Latin word capsa means “box.” An early use of the term bell pepper was in the year 1683. The name pepper was applied in Europe to all known spices with a hot and pungent taste and was therefore extended to genus Capsicum when it was introduced from the Americas.

Red, yellow, and green bell peppers are sometimes packaged and sold together in grocery stores under names like "tricolor" or "stoplight mix".

== Colors ==
The most common colors of bell peppers are green, yellow, orange and red. Other colors include brown, white, lavender, and dark purple, depending on the variety. Most typically, unripe fruits are green or, less commonly, pale yellow or purple. Red bell peppers are simply ripened green peppers, although the 'Permagreen' variety maintains its green color even when fully ripe. Therefore, mixed colored peppers also exist during parts of the ripening process.

Peppers, sweet, red, raw
Nutritional value per 100 g (3.5 oz)
- Energy: 110 kJ (26 kcal)
- Carbohydrates: 6.65 g
- Sugars: 2.4 g
- Dietary fiber: 1.8 g
- Fat: 0.13 g
- Protein: 0.9 g
Vitamins and minerals
Vitamins	Quantity %DV^{†}
Vitamin A equiv. beta-Carotene lutein zeaxanthin	17% 157 μg 15% 1624 μg 341 μg
Thiamine (B1)	5% 0.055 mg
Riboflavin (B2)	11% 0.142 mg
Niacin (B3)	6% 1 mg
Pantothenic acid (B5)	6% 0.317 mg
Vitamin B6	18% 0.3 mg
Folate (B9)	12% 47 μg
Vitamin C	158% 142 mg
Vitamin E	11% 1.58 mg
Vitamin K	6% 7.4 μg
Minerals	Quantity %DV^{†}
Calcium	0% 6 mg
Iron	2% 0.35 mg
Magnesium	3% 11 mg
Manganese	6% 0.133 mg
Phosphorus	2% 27 mg
Potassium	7% 213 mg
Sodium	0% 3 mg
Zinc	2% 0.2 mg
- Other constituents: Quantity
- Water: 92 g
- Link to USDA Database entry
- ^{†}Percentages estimated using US recommendations for adults, except for potassium, which is estimated based on expert recommendation from the National Academies.

== Nutrition ==
A raw red bell pepper is 92% water, 7% carbohydrates, 1% protein, and contains negligible fat (table). A 100-gram (3 1/2-ounce) reference amount supplies 26 calories of food energy, and is a rich source of vitamin C – containing 158% of the Daily Value (DV) – with moderate contents of vitamin A, vitamin B6, riboflavin, folate, and vitamin E (11–18% DV, table). A red bell pepper supplies more vitamin C and vitamin A content than a green bell pepper.

== Uses ==
Like the tomato, bell peppers are botanical fruits and culinary vegetables. Pieces of bell pepper are commonly used in garden salads and as toppings on pizza. There are many varieties of stuffed peppers prepared using hollowed or halved bell peppers. Bell peppers (and other cultivars of C. annuum) may be used in the production of the spice paprika.

== Production ==
In 2024, world production of raw peppers was 933,415 tonnes, led by Vietnam with 262,230 tonnes, India with 126,038 tonnes, and Brazil with 124,925 tonnes.

== See also ==
- List of Capsicum cultivars
