= Friggitello =

Italian sweet pepper

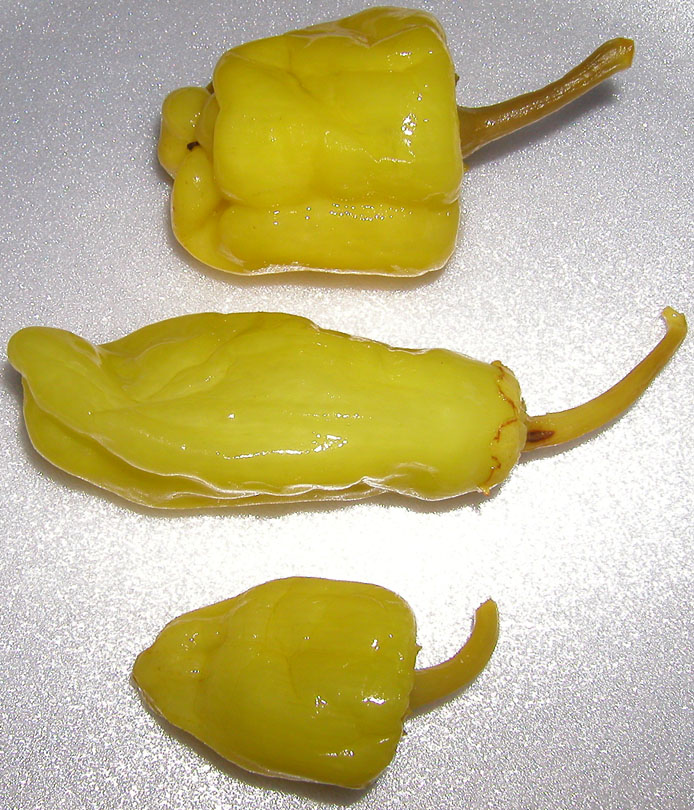
- Three pickled friggitelli
- Species: Capsicum annuum
- Origin: Italy
- Heat: Mild
- Scoville scale: 100–500 SHU

Friggitello (pl.: friggitelli) is a sweet Italian chili pepper of the species Capsicum annuum. It is also known as the "Golden Greek pepper", "Sweet Italian pepper", or "Tuscan pepper". In the United States they may be called "pepperoncini"; they are quite distinct from Italian peperoncini, which are hot Italian chili peppers. Friggitello is mild with a slight heat and a hint of bitterness, and is sometimes pickled and sold in jars. In Italy friggitello is most associated with the region of Tuscany. The Greek variety, which is sweeter, is commonly used elsewhere in Europe and the United States.

== Cultivation ==
Like many other cultivars of Capsicum annuum, friggitello requires a warm climate with a lot of sunlight and is not tolerant of frost. The seeds take 10 to 14 days to germinate, after which the plant will reach maturity in 70 to 80 days. It appreciates slightly rich and well-drained soils, but overfertilized soil will result in fewer fruits. The plant has the potential to grow plenty of fruits, so it requires staking if it is to be prevented from falling over due to the weight of the fruits. The fruits should be harvested when they are 5–7.5 centimetres (2–3 in) long. Mature fruits will eventually turn red, but it is best to pick them while they are still green.

== Culinary use ==
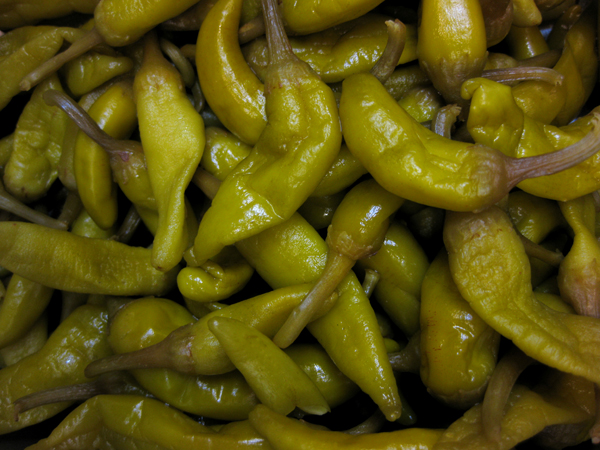
Friggitelli served in a Swedish kebab restaurant

Although it is often pickled, friggitello has a complex flavor which is appreciated most when it is eaten fresh. It lends itself very well to sautéing, stuffing, and popping. It combines nicely with fruits and is a suitable ingredient to use in salads and compotes or on sandwiches.

They are also often served with kebab, such as İskender kebap. Pickled friggitelli can vary in color from bright yellow to bright yellow-green. They are sometimes briefly rinsed in cold water before serving to reduce the effects of the pickling brine on the taste.

== Sources ==
- Iannotti, Marie (2011). The Beginner's Guide to Growing Heirloom Vegetables: The 100 Easiest-to-Grow, Tastiest-to-Eat Vegetables for Your Garden. Portland, Oregon: Timber Press. ISBN 9781604693843.
- Kipfer, Barbara Ann (2011). The Culinarian: A Kitchen Desk Reference. Hoboken, New Jersey: John Wiley & Sons. ISBN 9780544186033.
