= Capsicum schottianum =

Scientific classification
- Kingdom: Plantae
- Clade: Tracheophytes
- Clade: Angiosperms
- Clade: Eudicots
- Clade: Asterids
- Order: Solanales
- Family: Solanaceae
- Genus: Capsicum
- Species: C. schottianum

Binomial name
- Capsicum schottianum Sendtn.

Species of wild chili pepper

Capsicum schottianum is a species of wild chili pepper in the nightshade family Solanaceae, native to southeastern Brazil. It was described by Otto Sendtner in 1846, and is one of the wild species of Capsicum treated in the 2022 monograph of the genus by Barboza and colleagues.

== Description ==
An erect shrub 1–2.5 m tall, or a small tree 3–5 m tall, much branched with dichotomous zig-zag branches. The leaves are membranous, elliptic to ovate, the larger blades roughly 9.5–16.5 cm long (up to 25 cm). Flowers are borne two to five per leaf axil.

== Distribution and habitat ==
It is native to southeastern Brazil, where it grows in a wet tropical climate.
