= Capsicum parvifolium =

Scientific classification
- Kingdom: Plantae
- Clade: Tracheophytes
- Clade: Angiosperms
- Clade: Eudicots
- Clade: Asterids
- Order: Solanales
- Family: Solanaceae
- Genus: Capsicum
- Species: C. parvifolium

Binomial name
- Capsicum parvifolium Sendtn.

Species of wild chili pepper

Capsicum parvifolium is a species of wild chili pepper in the nightshade family Solanaceae, native to Brazil, Colombia and Venezuela. It was described by Otto Sendtner in 1846, and is one of the wild species of Capsicum treated in the 2022 monograph of the genus by Barboza and colleagues.

== Description ==
An erect shrub 1–4 m tall (rarely to 5 m) with an almost broom-like (fastigiate) habit, much branched above. The leaves are ovate and comparatively small, the larger blades 3–8 cm long. Flowers are borne three to six per leaf axil (occasionally up to eight).

== Distribution and habitat ==
It is native to a range extending from northern Colombia and northern Venezuela to northeastern Brazil, reaching south to northern Minas Gerais. It grows in a seasonally dry tropical climate.
