= Capsicum campylopodium =

Scientific classification
- Kingdom: Plantae
- Clade: Tracheophytes
- Clade: Angiosperms
- Clade: Eudicots
- Clade: Asterids
- Order: Solanales
- Family: Solanaceae
- Genus: Capsicum
- Species: C. campylopodium

Binomial name
- Capsicum campylopodium Sendtn.

Species of wild chili pepper

Capsicum campylopodium is a species of wild chili pepper in the nightshade family Solanaceae, native to southeastern Brazil. It was described by Otto Sendtner in 1846, and is one of the wild species of Capsicum treated in the 2022 monograph of the genus by Barboza and colleagues.

== Description ==
An erect subshrub or shrub 0.5–2 m tall, much branched above, with the branches spreading dichotomously in a characteristic zig-zag pattern. The leaves are membranous, elliptic to ovate, the larger blades 4–11.5 cm long. Flowers are borne two to five per leaf axil on very thin pedicels 9–14 mm long.

== Distribution and habitat ==
It is native to southeastern Brazil, where it grows in a wet tropical climate.
