= Capsicum recurvatum =

Scientific classification
- Kingdom: Plantae
- Clade: Tracheophytes
- Clade: Angiosperms
- Clade: Eudicots
- Clade: Asterids
- Order: Solanales
- Family: Solanaceae
- Genus: Capsicum
- Species: C. recurvatum

Binomial name
- Capsicum recurvatum Witasek

Species of wild chili pepper

Capsicum recurvatum is a species of wild chili pepper in the nightshade family Solanaceae, native to southern and southeastern Brazil. It was described by Johanna Witasek in 1910, and is one of the wild species of Capsicum treated in the 2022 monograph of the genus by Barboza and colleagues.

== Description ==
An erect shrub 1.5–4 m tall with a thick main stem, much branched, the branches dichotomous and spreading in a zig-zag pattern. The leaves are elliptic to ovate, the larger blades 5–16 cm long.

== Distribution and habitat ==
It is native to southeastern and southern Brazil, where it grows in a wet tropical climate.
