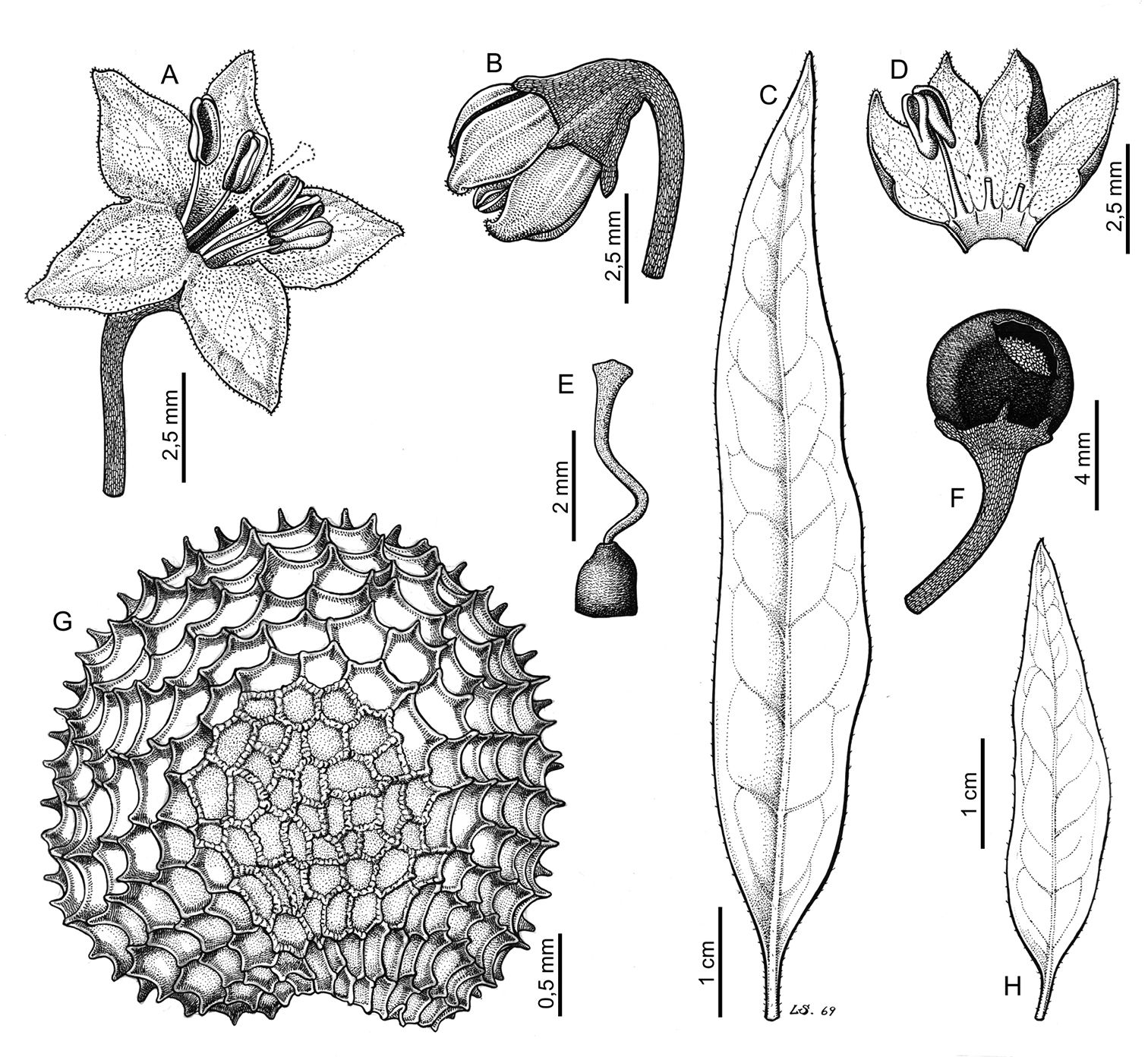
- Capsicum mirabile A flower, B flower bud C, H leaf, D open corolla, E gynoecium, F fruit, G seed

Scientific classification
- Kingdom: Plantae
- Clade: Tracheophytes
- Clade: Angiosperms
- Clade: Eudicots
- Clade: Asterids
- Order: Solanales
- Family: Solanaceae
- Genus: Capsicum
- Species: C. mirabile

Binomial name
- Capsicum mirabile Mart. ex Sendtn.

Synonyms
- Capsicum mirabile var. grandiflorum Sendtn.

= Capsicum mirabile =

Species of flowering plant

Capsicum mirabile is a wild species of the genus Capsicum, which is found in the rainforests of Brazil. It was first described botanically in 1846.
