= Capsicum friburgense =

Scientific classification
- Kingdom: Plantae
- Clade: Tracheophytes
- Clade: Angiosperms
- Clade: Eudicots
- Clade: Asterids
- Order: Solanales
- Family: Solanaceae
- Genus: Capsicum
- Species: C. friburgense

Binomial name
- Capsicum friburgense Bianch. & Barboza

Species of wild chili pepper

Capsicum friburgense is a species of wild chili pepper in the nightshade family Solanaceae, native to southeastern Brazil. It was described by Luciano de Bem Bianchetti and Gloria E. Barboza in 2005, and is treated in the 2022 monograph of the genus Capsicum by Barboza and colleagues.

== Description ==
An erect shrub 0.8–2.5 m tall (rarely to 3 m), the branches pendulous and dichotomously spreading in a zig-zag pattern. The young stems bear sparse simple hairs together with abundant minute glandular hairs. The leaves are ovate to elliptic, the larger blades roughly 8.5–13 cm long.

== Distribution and habitat ==
It is native to central Rio de Janeiro state in southeastern Brazil, where it grows in a wet tropical climate.
