= Capsicum regale =

Scientific classification
- Kingdom: Plantae
- Clade: Tracheophytes
- Clade: Angiosperms
- Clade: Eudicots
- Clade: Asterids
- Order: Solanales
- Family: Solanaceae
- Genus: Capsicum
- Species: C. regale

Binomial name
- Capsicum regale Barboza & Bohs

Species of wild chili pepper

Capsicum regale is a species of wild chili pepper in the nightshade family Solanaceae, native to Colombia, Ecuador and Peru. It was described by Gloria E. Barboza and Lynn Bohs in 2020, and is one of the wild species of Capsicum treated in the 2022 monograph of the genus by Barboza and colleagues.

== Description ==
An erect, slender shrub 1.8–2.5 m tall (rarely to 3 m), sparsely branched toward the tip with weak, horizontally spreading branches. The leaves are membranous and large, elliptic, the larger blades 17–20 cm long and up to about 9 cm wide, the midvein purple beneath. Unusually for the genus, the flowers are borne five to thirteen together along an elongated axis rather than clustered in the leaf axils.

== Distribution and habitat ==
It is native to a range extending from southern Colombia through Ecuador to northwestern Peru, where it grows in a wet tropical climate.
