= Capsicum longidentatum =

Scientific classification
- Kingdom: Plantae
- Clade: Tracheophytes
- Clade: Angiosperms
- Clade: Eudicots
- Clade: Asterids
- Order: Solanales
- Family: Solanaceae
- Genus: Capsicum
- Species: C. longidentatum

Binomial name
- Capsicum longidentatum Agra & Barboza

Species of wild chili pepper

Capsicum longidentatum is a species of wild chili pepper in the nightshade family Solanaceae, native to eastern Brazil. It was described by Maria de Fátima Agra and Gloria E. Barboza in 2011, and is treated in the 2022 monograph of the genus Capsicum by Barboza and colleagues.

== Description ==
An erect, slender or half-scrambling shrub 1.5–4 m tall, much branched from near the base; the youngest stems bear branched (forked to feathery) hairs. The leaves are ovate and densely hairy, the larger blades small, only 3.5–5.4 cm long. Flowers are borne two to five per axil on strongly angled, pendent stalks.

== Distribution and habitat ==
It is native to eastern Brazil, from Pernambuco south to northern Minas Gerais, where it grows in a seasonally dry tropical climate.
