= Capsicum carassense =

Scientific classification
- Kingdom: Plantae
- Clade: Tracheophytes
- Clade: Angiosperms
- Clade: Eudicots
- Clade: Asterids
- Order: Solanales
- Family: Solanaceae
- Genus: Capsicum
- Species: C. carassense

Binomial name
- Capsicum carassense Barboza & Bianch.

Species of wild chili pepper

Capsicum carassense is a species of wild chili pepper in the nightshade family Solanaceae. It is a shrub native southeastern Minas Gerais in southeastern Brazil. It was described by Gloria E. Barboza and Luciano de Bem Bianchetti in 2020, and is treated in the 2022 monograph of the genus Capsicum by Barboza and colleagues.

== Description ==
An erect shrub 1–2 m tall (rarely to 3 m), sparsely branched, the branches dichotomous and spreading horizontally, the stems covered with short hairs. The leaves are narrowly elliptic to lanceolate, the larger blades 6–16 cm long and only 0.9–2.5 cm wide. Flowers are borne two to four per leaf axil.

== Distribution and habitat ==
It is native to southeastern Minas Gerais in southeastern Brazil, where it grows in a seasonally dry tropical climate.
