= Capsicum cornutum =

Scientific classification
- Kingdom: Plantae
- Clade: Tracheophytes
- Clade: Angiosperms
- Clade: Eudicots
- Clade: Asterids
- Order: Solanales
- Family: Solanaceae
- Genus: Capsicum
- Species: C. cornutum

Binomial name
- Capsicum cornutum (Hiern) Hunz.

Synonyms
- Bassovia cornuta Hiern; Capsicum dusenii Bitter

Species of wild chili pepper

Capsicum cornutum is a species of wild chili pepper in the nightshade family Solanaceae. It is a subshrub or shrub native to the states of Rio de Janeiro and São Paulo in southeastern Brazil.

The species was first described as Bassovia cornuta by William Philip Hiern in 1878. In 1954 Armando Theodoro Hunziker placed the species in genus Capsicum as C. cornutum. It is one of the wild species of Capsicum treated in the 2022 monograph of the genus by Barboza and colleagues.

== Description ==
An erect shrub or subshrub 1–3.5 m tall, much branched with zig-zag branches; the young stems are densely covered with rusty (ferruginous) hairs. The leaves are ovate to broadly elliptic, the larger blades 6–16 cm long.

== Distribution and habitat ==
It is native to the Brazilian states of Rio de Janeiro and São Paulo, where it grows in a wet tropical climate.
