= Capsicum lanceolatum =

Scientific classification
- Kingdom: Plantae
- Clade: Tracheophytes
- Clade: Angiosperms
- Clade: Eudicots
- Clade: Asterids
- Order: Solanales
- Family: Solanaceae
- Genus: Capsicum
- Species: C. lanceolatum

Binomial name
- Capsicum lanceolatum (Greenm.) C.V.Morton & Standl.

Synonyms
- Brachistus lanceolatus

Species of flowering plant

Capsicum lanceolatum is a species of plant in the genus Capsicum in the nightshade family (Solanaceae). The species has its original range in Guatemala and in the neighboring countries of Mexico and Honduras. Currently, only one natural occurrence of the species is known; all other previously known deposits were destroyed by converting the sites into agricultural land.

== Description ==
=== Vegetative characteristics ===
Like almost all members of the genus, Capsicum lanceolatum is a bushy plant with a mostly slender, upright habit and a height of 1 to 5 m. Capsicum lanceolatum differs from all other species of the genus primarily in the combination of leaf shape and position. The leaves usually appear in pairs, with both leaves pointing roughly in the same direction but having very different sizes and shapes. While there are large, elongated leaves with a length of 6 to 11 cm and a width of 1.5 to 3 mm, there are also small, almost round leaves with a size of 0.5 to 2 × 0.8 to 1.5 cm. Both leaf types are slightly hairy.

=== Blossoms ===
The flowering period extends from May to December. The flowers are solitary, rarely in pairs, in the axils of the shoots on 1.5 to 3 cm long, slender flower stalks extending to 3 to 5 cm until the fruit ripens. The heavily ribbed calyx is 1.3 to 2 mm long during flowering and hardly lengthens afterward. On the edge of the calyx are 2 to 5 mm-long calyx teeth, which lengthen to 4 to 5.5 mm as the fruit ripens. The petals of the fivefold flowers, which are fused to one another for well over half the length, are yellowish-white or two-tone white and red-purple, slightly hairy at the tips. The stamens are about 2.5 mm long, and the anthers are 1.3 to 1.5 mm long. The style is 4.5 to 5 mm long.

=== Fruits and seeds ===
As with most wild species of the genus, the very small, round berries are orange-red with a diameter of 7 to 10 mm, filled with flesh. As with other members of the Andean clade, the fruits are not spicy. The seeds are whitish or black and 2 to 2.5 mm in size. The plant is self-compatible.

=== Other characteristics ===
Like some other wild Brazilian species, C. lanceolatum has 13 pairs of chromosomes. Typical features of the species with this chromosome number are the preference for damp locations and the mostly yellowish-green, non-spicy, small fruits. The orange-red fruits distinguish C. lanceolatum from other related species.

== Distribution and habitat ==
The mountain rainforests and cloud forests of Guatemala at an altitude of 1200–1800 meters are specified as the location of C. lanceolatum, the environment is described as damp and hazy. Within the group with 13 chromosome pairs, C. lanceolatum is one of the species with the most northerly range; the other species are mainly found in southeastern Brazil. The records of scientist Paul C. Standley's 1938–39 Guatemala expedition provide the most comprehensive description of C. lanceolatum, as well as the locations where plants of the species were found. Herbarium specimens collected during this expedition are on display today at the Field Museum of Natural History in Chicago. A further description of the species was made in 1974, also with the collaboration of Paul C. Standley.

Based on the accurate records of the 1938–1939 expedition, another expedition to Guatemala was organized under Paul W. Bosland in 1991 to collect specimens of the species for more extensive study. At the time, there were no known living plants of the species in the collections available for research. All of the sites described by Standley have been visited, but have been converted to agricultural land or covered by post-use secondary forest. New colonization of C. lanceolatum could not be determined when examining the sites.

However, a new, previously unknown location was discovered. Plants classified as C. lanceolatum were discovered in the 1133-hectare Biotopo el Quetzal, a sanctuary for the quetzal bird (Pharomachrus mocinno). Although they differ in some characteristics from the plants described by Standley, such a scattering of characteristics can also be observed in other species of the genus Capsicum. The color of the flowers is white in the original description, and red in the plants found by Bosland; the color of the seeds is also given as white by Standley, while the plants from the Biotopo el Quetzal have black seeds. All other characteristics correspond to the description of the plant from 1974 and were also found in the herbarium plants of the collection from 1938 to 1939.

Since other species in the genus Capsicum has also specialized in avian dispersal, Bosland theorizes that the distribution of C. lanceolatum may be related to the distribution of the quetzal bird. This is supported by the similarity in the habitats of both creatures and the absence of C. lanceolatum in restored forest areas where other cloud forest plants have resettled.

In this context, Bosland points out that the preservation of the natural habitats of wild species of the genus Capsicum is important since these wild species could possibly provide genetic material that can provide cultivated peppers with resistance to diseases or adaptations to extreme environmental conditions.

== Classification ==
To position the species Capsicum lanceolatum within the genus Capsicum, the team led by Paul W. Bosland carried out various studies of the chromosome structure and compatibility with other species of the genus. It was initially determined that Capsicum lanceolatum does not have 12 pairs of chromosomes like most species of the genus but, like the wild species Capsicum cilatum, for example, has 13 pairs of chromosomes. A fertilization barrier is suspected between species with 12 pairs of chromosomes and those with 13 pairs of chromosomes. Among other things, this explains why the crossing attempts with other species of the genus either did not result in fertilization, or only produced fruits with empty seed coats or, in one case, an underdeveloped embryo. However, since there is still no complete investigation of the crossing behavior between the species of the genus Capsicum, no precise statement could be made about the historical developmental relationships. At this point, it can be said with certainty how the extra chromosome came about. With the knowledge gained in this way, however, it was likely that Capsicum lanaceolatum could not be classified into the three known evolutionary groups around Capsicum annuum, Capsicum baccatum, or Capsicum pubescens.

Studies on wild and semi-wild Brazilian Capsicum species showed that the number of species with 13 pairs of chromosomes is significantly higher than initially assumed. These results challenged some previously unproven assumptions about the evolutionary history of the genus Capsicum. For example, it was assumed that the 13th pair of chromosomes could be broken down by mechanisms such as the so-called centric fission that has arisen. However, since no features indicative of centric fission were found on the remaining 12 "original" chromosome pairs, this theory can be considered false. Rather, it now appears more likely that the group of species with 13 chromosome pairs is the original one and that one chromosome pair was lost in an as yet unexplained manner during the species increasing northward distribution. As a result, species with only 12 pairs of chromosomes changed their appearance, for example, by developing predominantly red fruits, which have a significantly higher pungency. Since the climatic conditions remained constant in the original distribution area of southeastern Brazil, the species with 13 chromosome pairs were able to survive there.

== Etymology ==
The scientific name of the species (lanceolatum) derives from the leaf shape (lanceolate). The indigenous Mayan word for the plant is "IC", pronounced with a characteristic click in the word. The colloquial names "Yerba de pajarito" (little birdweed) and "Pajarito del rio" (little bird of the river) are common.
