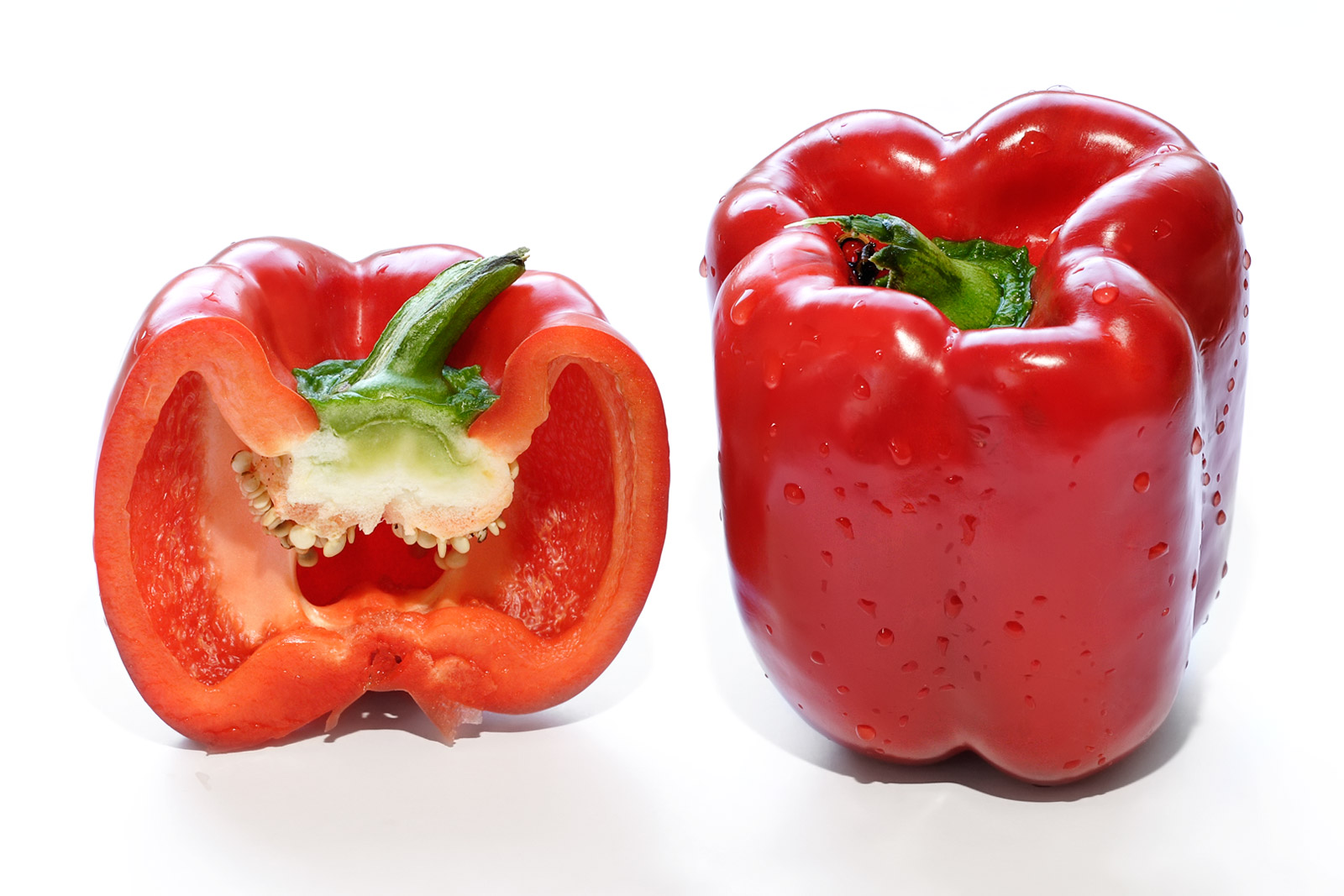
- Capsicum fruit and longitudinal section

Scientific classification
- Kingdom: Plantae
- Clade: Tracheophytes
- Clade: Angiosperms
- Clade: Eudicots
- Clade: Asterids
- Order: Solanales
- Family: Solanaceae
- Subfamily: Solanoideae
- Tribe: Capsiceae
- Genus: Capsicum; L.

Species
- See text

= Capsicum =

Genus of flowering plants

Capsicum (/ˈkæpsɪkəm/) is a genus of flowering plants in the nightshade family Solanaceae, native to the Americas, cultivated worldwide for their edible fruit, which are generally known as peppers or capsicums. Chili peppers grow on five species of Capsicum. Sweet or bell peppers and many chili peppers come from Capsicum annuum, making it the most cultivated species in the genus.

== History ==
Capsicum is native to South America and Central America. These plants have been evolving for 17 million years. It was domesticated and cultivated at least since 3000 BC, as evidenced by remains of chili peppers found in pottery from Puebla and Oaxaca.

== Etymology and names ==
The generic name may come from Latin capsa, meaning "box", presumably alluding to the pods; or possibly from the Greek word κάπτω, kapto, "to gulp". The common name pepper alludes to black pepper, which, like many capsicums, has a hot, pungent taste. There is no botanical relationship between the two.

The fruit (botanically a berry) of Capsicum plants has a variety of names depending on place and type. The more piquant varieties are called chili peppers or simply chilis, a word of Nahuatl origin. The large, mild forms are called bell peppers or are named by color (green pepper, green bell pepper, red bell pepper, etc.) in North America. In South Africa and some other countries, they are called sweet peppers. The word pepper alone is used in the United Kingdom and Ireland. The word capsicum is used in Australia, India, Malaysia, Singapore and New Zealand.

== Phylogeny ==
Capsicums are solanaceous plants within the tribe Capsiceae, and are closely related to Lycianthes.

A 2020 study using ribosomal DNA provided the following internal phylogenetic tree. It can be seen that in two of the clades, the species C. frutescens is intermingled with C. chinense and that C. chacoense is intermingled with C. baccatum.

- Capsicum
  - - - - - C. annuum inc. many varieties (11 sequences)
          - - C. frutescens (6 sequences) and 3 dubious "C. eximium" (different sequences from a single sample: result of incomplete concerted evolution)
            - - C. frutescens (1 sequences: a paraphyletic group)
              - C. chinense and 1 stray C. frutescens (incomplete conc. evo.)
        - - C. baccatum (7 sequences)
          - - C. chacoense (2 sequences, incomplete conc. evo. of one sample)
            - - C. baccatum (2 sequences)
              - C. chacoense (1 sequences, incomplete conc. evo. of the same sample)
      - C. pubescens inc. Chile de caballo (9 sequences)
    - C. eximium, a pungent chili pepper with purple flowers
  - C. lycianthoides

An expansive internal phylogeny based on genome-wide RAD-seq was published in 2022.

External phylogenies can be found in a variety of references. The best-studied close relatives are the tomato and the potato. The tomatillo (Physaleae) is even more closely related. The sister genus is Lycianthes.

== Growing conditions ==
Ideal growing conditions for peppers include a sunny position with warm, loamy soil, ideally 21 to 29 °C (70 to 84 °F), that is moist but not waterlogged. Extremely moist soils can cause seedlings to "damp-off" and reduce germination.

The plants will tolerate (but do not like) temperatures down to 12 °C (54 °F) and they are sensitive to cold. For flowering, Capsicum is a non-photoperiod-sensitive crop. The flowers can self-pollinate. However, at extremely high temperature, 30 to 38 °C (86 to 100 °F), pollen loses viability, and flowers are much less likely to result in fruit.

== Species and varieties ==
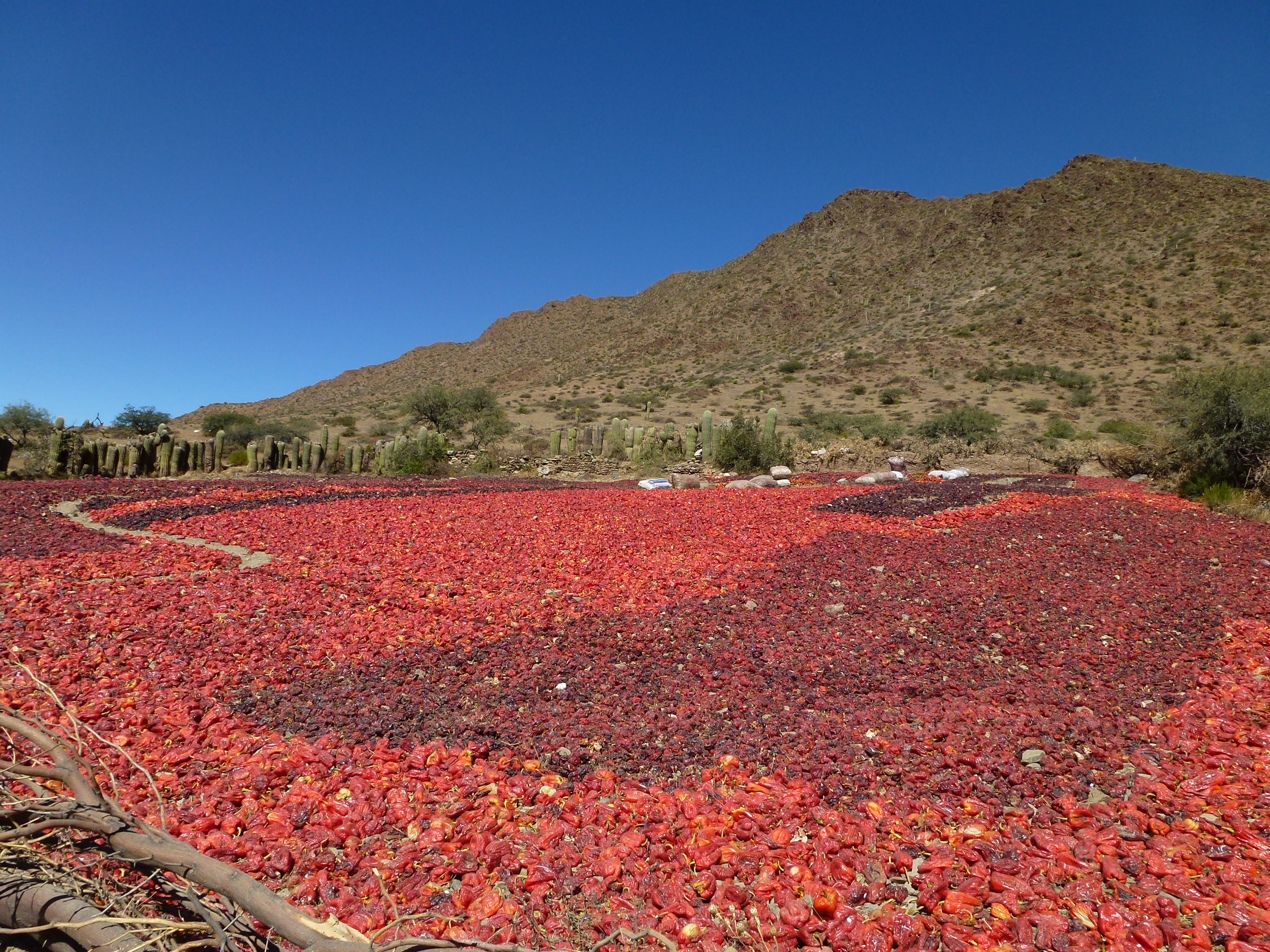
Red peppers in Cachi, Argentina air-drying before being processed into powder

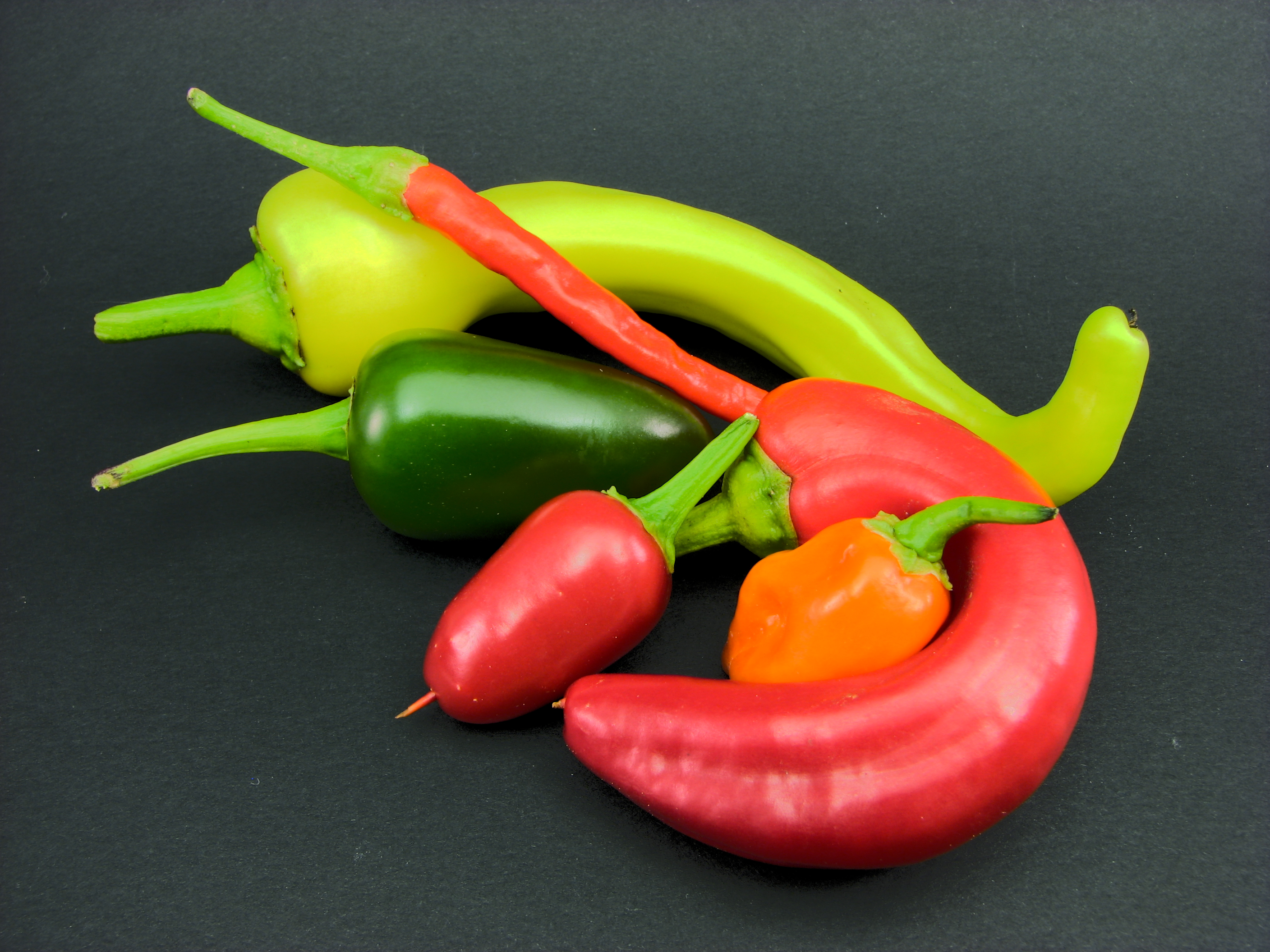
An arrangement of chilis, including jalapeño, banana, cayenne, and habanero peppers.

Capsicum consists of 20–27 species, five of which are widely cultivated: C. annuum, C. baccatum, C. chinense, C. frutescens, and C. pubescens. A 2022 monograph by Barboza and colleagues recognised 43 species of Capsicum, together with five infraspecific varieties, and grouped the wild and cultivated species into a series of clades. Phylogenetic relationships between species have been investigated using biogeographical, morphological, chemosystematic, hybridization, and genetic data. Fruits of Capsicum can vary tremendously in color, shape, and size both between and within species, which has led to confusion over the relationships among taxa. Chemosystematic studies helped distinguish the difference between varieties and species. For example, C. baccatum var. baccatum had the same flavonoids as C. baccatum var. pendulum, which led researchers to believe the two groups belonged to the same species.

Many varieties of the same species can be used in many different ways; for example, C. annuum includes the "bell pepper" variety, which is sold in its immature green state, yellow, orange and red, though different colors are not ripeness stages of the same single variety. This same species has other varieties, as well, such as the Anaheim chiles often used for stuffing, the dried ancho (before being dried it is called a poblano) chile used to make chili powder, the mild-to-hot, ripe jalapeño used to make smoked jalapeño, known as chipotle.

Peru is thought to be the country with the highest cultivated Capsicum diversity since varieties of all five domesticates are commonly sold in markets in contrast to other countries. Bolivia is considered to be the country where the largest diversity of wild Capsicum peppers are consumed. Bolivian consumers distinguish two basic forms: ulupicas, species with small round fruits including C. eximium, C. cardenasii, C. eshbaughii, and C. caballeroi landraces; and arivivis, with small elongated fruits including C. baccatum var. baccatum and C. chacoense varieties.

The amount of capsaicin is measured in Scoville heat units (SHU) and this value varies significantly among Capsicum varieties. For example, a typical Bell pepper has a value of 0-500 SHU and a Jalapeño has a value of 4000–8000 SHU. In 2017, the Guinness Book of World Records listed the Carolina Reaper as the world's hottest pepper at 1,641,183 SHU, according to tests conducted by Winthrop University in South Carolina, United States. In 2023, the Guinness Book of Records recognized Pepper X as the world's hottest pepper.

=== Species list ===
Sources:

- Capsicum annuum L.
  - glabriusculum var.
  - New Mexico Group
- Capsicum baccatum L.
- Capsicum benoistii Hunz. ex Barboza
- Capsicum buforum Hunz.
- Capsicum caatingae Barboza & Agra
- Capsicum caballeroi M. Nee
- Capsicum campylopodium Sendtn.
- Capsicum carassense Barboza & Bianch.
- Capsicum cardenasii Heiser & P. G. Sm.
- Capsicum ceratocalyx M. Nee
- Capsicum chacoense Hunz.
- Capsicum chinense Jacq.
- Capsicum coccineum (Rusby) Hunz.
- Capsicum cornutum (Hiern) Hunz.
- Capsicum dimorphum (Miers) Kuntze
- Capsicum dusenii Bitter
- Capsicum eshbaughii Barboza
- Capsicum eximium Hunz.
- Capsicum flexuosum Sendtn.
- Capsicum friburgense Bianch. & Barboza
- Capsicum frutescens L.
- Capsicum galapagoense Hunz.
- Capsicum geminifolium (Dammer) Hunz.
- Capsicum havanense Kunth
- Capsicum hookerianum (Miers) Kuntze
- Capsicum hunzikerianum Bianch. & Barboza
- Capsicum lanceolatum (Greenm.) C.V.Morton & Standl.
- Capsicum leptopodum (Dunal) Kuntze
- Capsicum longidentatum Agra & Barboza
- Capsicum longifolium Barboza & S. Leiva
- Capsicum lycianthoides Bitter
- Capsicum minutiflorum (Rusby) Hunz.
- Capsicum mirabile Mart. ex Sendtn.
- Capsicum mositicum Toledo
- Capsicum neei Barboza & X. Reyes
- Capsicum parvifolium Sendtn.
- Capsicum pereirae Bianch. & Barboza
- Capsicum pubescens Ruiz & Pav.
- Capsicum piuranum S. Leiva & Barboza
- Capsicum praetermissum Heiser & Smith
- Capsicum ramosissimum Witasek
- Capsicum recurvatum Witasek
- Capsicum regale Barboza & Bohs
- Capsicum rhomboideum (Dunal) Kuntze
- Capsicum schottianum Sendtn.
- Capsicum scolnikianum Hunz.
- Capsicum spina-alba (Dunal) Kuntze
- Capsicum stramoniifolium (Kunth) Standl.
- Capsicum tovarii Eshbaugh et al.
- Capsicum villosum Sendtn.

According to Adepoju et al. (2021), the most commonly occurring Capsicum cultivars in Nigeria (and West Africa) are: C. fructescens var. fructescens L.; C. fructescens var. baccatum (L.) Irish; C. annuum var annuum L; C. annuum var. grossum (L.) Sendtn. and C. chinense Jacq.

=== Formerly placed here ===
- Tubocapsicum anomalum (Franch. & Sav.) Makino (as C. anomalum Franch. & Sav.)
- Vassobia fasciculata (Miers) Hunz. (as C. grandiflorum Kuntze)
- Witheringia stramoniifolia Kunth (as C. stramoniifolium (Kunth) Kuntze)

=== Genetics ===
Most Capsicum species are 2n=2x=24. A few of the non-domesticated species are 2n=2x=26. All are diploid.

The Capsicum annuum and Capsicum chinense genomes were completed in 2014. The Capsicum annuum genome is approximately 3.48 Gb, making it larger than the human genome, even though the chromosomes mostly correspond one-to-one with the ~0.9 Gb tomato genome. Over 75% of the pepper genome is composed of transposable elements, mostly Gypsy elements, distributed widely throughout the genome. The distribution of transposable elements is inversely correlated with gene density. Pepper is predicted to have 34,903 genes, approximately the same number as both tomato and potato, two related species within the family Solanaceae. The five genomes, each sequenced from a different variety, provide insight into how they have evolved over time.

500 genomes of all five cultivated species and their wild relatives have furthered knowledge on how specific traits arose.

=== Breeding ===
Many types of peppers have been bred for heat, size, and yield. Along with selection of specific fruit traits such as flavor and color, specific pest, disease and abiotic stress resistances are continually being selected. Breeding occurs in several environments dependent on the use of the final variety including but not limited to: conventional, organic, hydroponic, green house and shade house production environments.

Several breeding programs are being conducted by corporations and universities. In the United States, New Mexico State University has released several varieties in the last few years. Cornell University has worked to develop regionally adapted varieties that work better in cooler, damper climates. Other universities such as UC Davis, University of Wisconsin-Madison, and Oregon State University have smaller breeding programs. Many vegetable seed companies breed different types of peppers as well.

== Capsaicin ==
Molecular structure of capsaicin

The fruit of most species of Capsicum contains capsaicin (methyl-n-vanillyl nonenamide), a lipophilic chemical that can produce a burning sensation (pungency or spiciness) in the mouth of the eater. Most mammals find this unpleasant, whereas birds are unaffected. The secretion of capsaicin protects the fruit from consumption by insects.

Capsaicin is present in large quantities in the placental tissue (which holds the seeds), the internal membranes, and to a lesser extent, the other fleshy parts of the fruits of plants in this genus. The seeds themselves do not produce any capsaicin, although the highest concentration of capsaicin can be found in the white pith around the seeds. Most of the capsaicin in a pungent (hot) pepper is concentrated in blisters on the epidermis of the interior ribs (septa) that divide the chambers, or locules, of the fruit to which the seeds are attached.

A study on capsaicin production in fruits of C. chinense showed that capsaicinoids are produced only in the epidermal cells of the interlocular septa of pungent fruits, that blister formation only occurs as a result of capsaicinoid accumulation, and that pungency and blister formation are controlled by a single locus, Pun1, for which there exist at least two recessive alleles that result in non-pungency of C. chinense fruits.

The amount of capsaicin per fruit is highly variable, depending on genetics and the environment. The most recognized Capsicum without capsaicin is the bell pepper, a cultivar of Capsicum annuum, which has a zero rating on the Scoville scale. The lack of capsaicin in bell peppers is due to a recessive gene that eliminates capsaicin and, consequently, the hot taste usually associated with the rest of the genus Capsicum. There are also other peppers without capsaicin, mostly within the Capsicum annuum species, such as the cultivars Giant Marconi, Yummy Sweets, Jimmy Nardello, and Italian frying peppers (cubanelles).

Chili peppers are important in the medicine of Indigenous peoples, and capsaicin is used in modern medicine mainly in topical medications as a circulatory stimulant and analgesic. In more recent times, an aerosol extract of capsaicin, known as capsicum or pepper spray, has become used by law enforcement as a nonlethal means of incapacitating a person, and in a more widely dispersed form for riot control, or by individuals for personal defense. Capsaicin in vegetable oils or horticultural products can be used in gardening as a natural insecticide.

== Cuisine ==
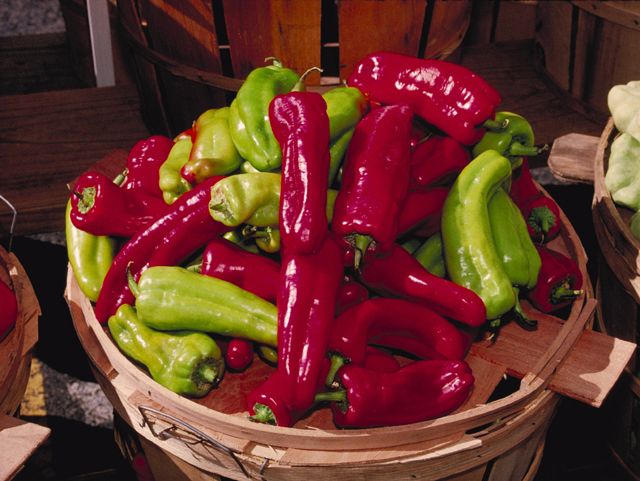
Chili peppers

Capsicum fruits can be eaten raw or cooked. Those used in cooking are generally varieties of the C. annuum and C. frutescens species, though a few others are used, as well. They are suitable for stuffing with fillings such as cheese, meat, or rice.

They are frequently used both chopped and raw in salads, or cooked in stir-fries or other mixed dishes. They can be sliced into strips and fried, roasted whole or in pieces, or chopped and incorporated into salsas or other sauces, of which they are often a main ingredient.

They can be preserved in the form of a jam, or by drying, pickling, or freezing. Dried Capsicum may be reconstituted whole, or processed into flakes or powders. Pickled or marinated Capsicum are frequently added to sandwiches or salads. Frozen Capsicum are used in stews, soups, and salsas. Extracts can be made and incorporated into hot sauces.

The Spanish conquistadors soon became aware of their culinary properties, and brought them back to Europe, together with cocoa, potatoes, sweet potatoes, tobacco, maize, beans, and turkeys. They also brought it to the Spanish Philippines colonies, whence it spread to Asia. The Portuguese brought them to their African and Asiatic possessions such as India. All varieties were appreciated but the hot ones were particularly appreciated, because they could enliven an otherwise monotonous diet during times of dietary restriction, such as during religious observances.

Spanish cuisine soon benefited from the discovery of chiles in the New World, and it would become very difficult to untangle Spanish cooking from chiles. Ground chiles, or paprika, hot or otherwise, are a key ingredient in chorizo, which is then called picante (if hot chile is added) or dulce (if otherwise). Paprika is an important ingredient in rice dishes, and plays a definitive role in squid Galician style (polbo á feira). Chopped chiles are used in fish or lamb dishes such as ajoarriero or chilindrón. Pisto is a vegetarian stew with chilies and zucchini as main ingredients. They can also be added, finely chopped, to gazpacho as a garnish. In some regions, bacon is salted and dusted in paprika for preservation. Cheese can also be rubbed with paprika to lend it flavor and colour. Dried round chiles called ñoras are used for arroz a banda.

After being introduced by the Portuguese, chile peppers saw widespread adoption throughout South, Southeast, and East Asia, especially in India, Thailand, Vietnam, China, and Korea. Several new cultivars were developed in these countries, and their use in combination with (or as a substitute for) existing 'hot' culinary spices such as black pepper and Sichuan pepper spread rapidly, giving rise to the modern forms a number of staple dishes such as chana masala, tom yum, laziji, and kimchi. This in turn influenced Anglo-Indian and American Chinese cuisine, most notably with the development of British and American forms of curry powder (based on Indian spice preparations such as garam masala), and dishes such as General Tso's chicken and chicken tikka masala.

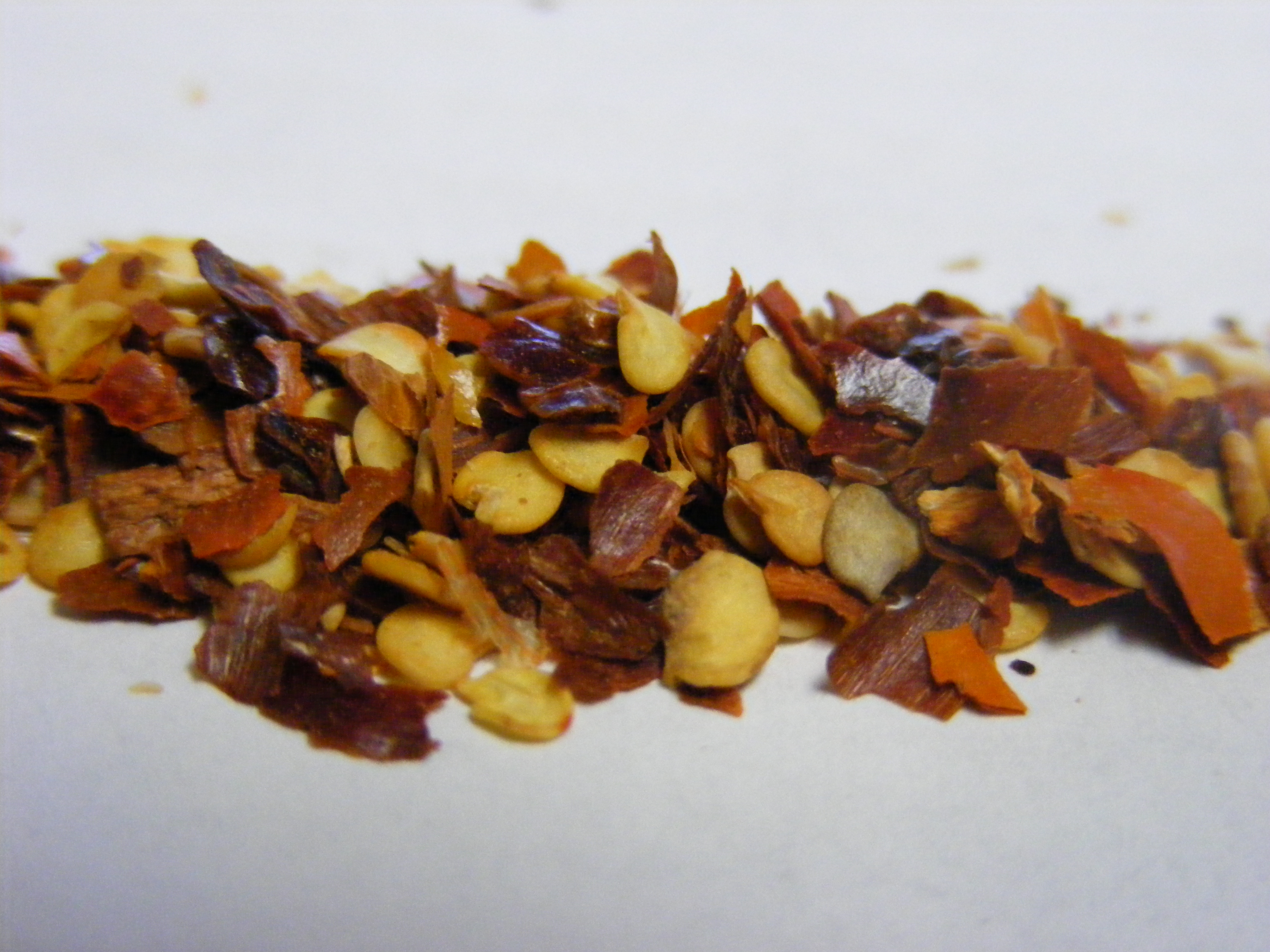
Crushed red pepper

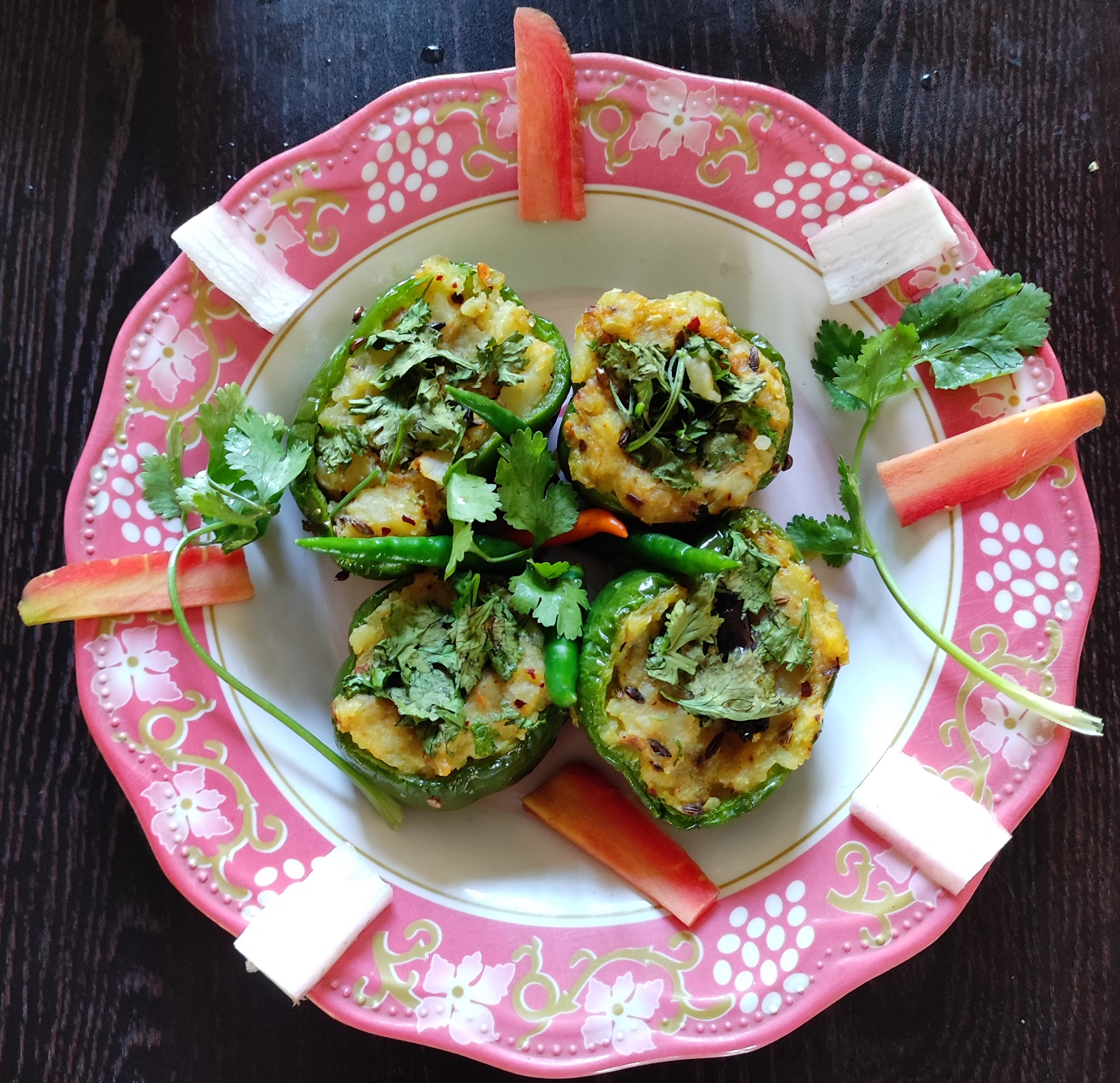
Stuffed capsicum with a spicy filling of potatoes, Kolkata, India

According to Richard Pankhurst, C. frutescens (known as berbere) was so important to the cuisine of Ethiopia, at least as early as the 19th century, "that it was cultivated extensively in the warmer areas wherever the soil was suitable". Although it was grown in every province, berbere was especially extensive in Yejju, "which supplied much of Showa, as well as other neighbouring provinces". He mentions the upper Golima River valley as being almost entirely devoted to the cultivation of this plant, where it was harvested year-round.

In 2005, a poll of 2,000 people revealed the capsicum to be Britain's fourth-favourite culinary vegetable.

In Hungary, sweet yellow capsicum – along with tomatoes – is the main ingredient of lecsó.

In Bulgaria, South Serbia, and North Macedonia, capsicum are very popular, too. They can be eaten in salads, like shopska salata; fried and then covered with a dip of tomato paste, onions, garlic, and parsley; or stuffed with a variety of products, such as minced meat and rice, beans, or cottage cheese and eggs. Capsicum are the main ingredient in the traditional tomato and capsicum dip lyutenitsa and ajvar. They are in the base of different kinds of pickled vegetables dishes, turshiya.

Capsicum is also used widely in Italian cuisine, and the hot species are used all around the southern part of Italy as a common spice (sometimes served with olive oil). Capsicums are used in many dishes; they can be cooked by themselves in a variety of ways (roasted, fried, deep-fried) and are a fundamental ingredient for some delicatessen specialties, such as 'nduja.

Capsicums are also used extensively in Sri Lanka cuisine as side dishes.

The Maya and Aztec people of Mesoamerica used Capsicum fruit in cocoa drinks as a flavouring.

In New Mexico, there is a Capsicum annuum cultivar group called the New Mexico chile which is a mainstay of the state's New Mexican cuisine.

=== GRAS ===
Only Capsicum frutescens L. and Capsicum annuum L. are Generally recognized as safe.

== Synonyms and common names ==
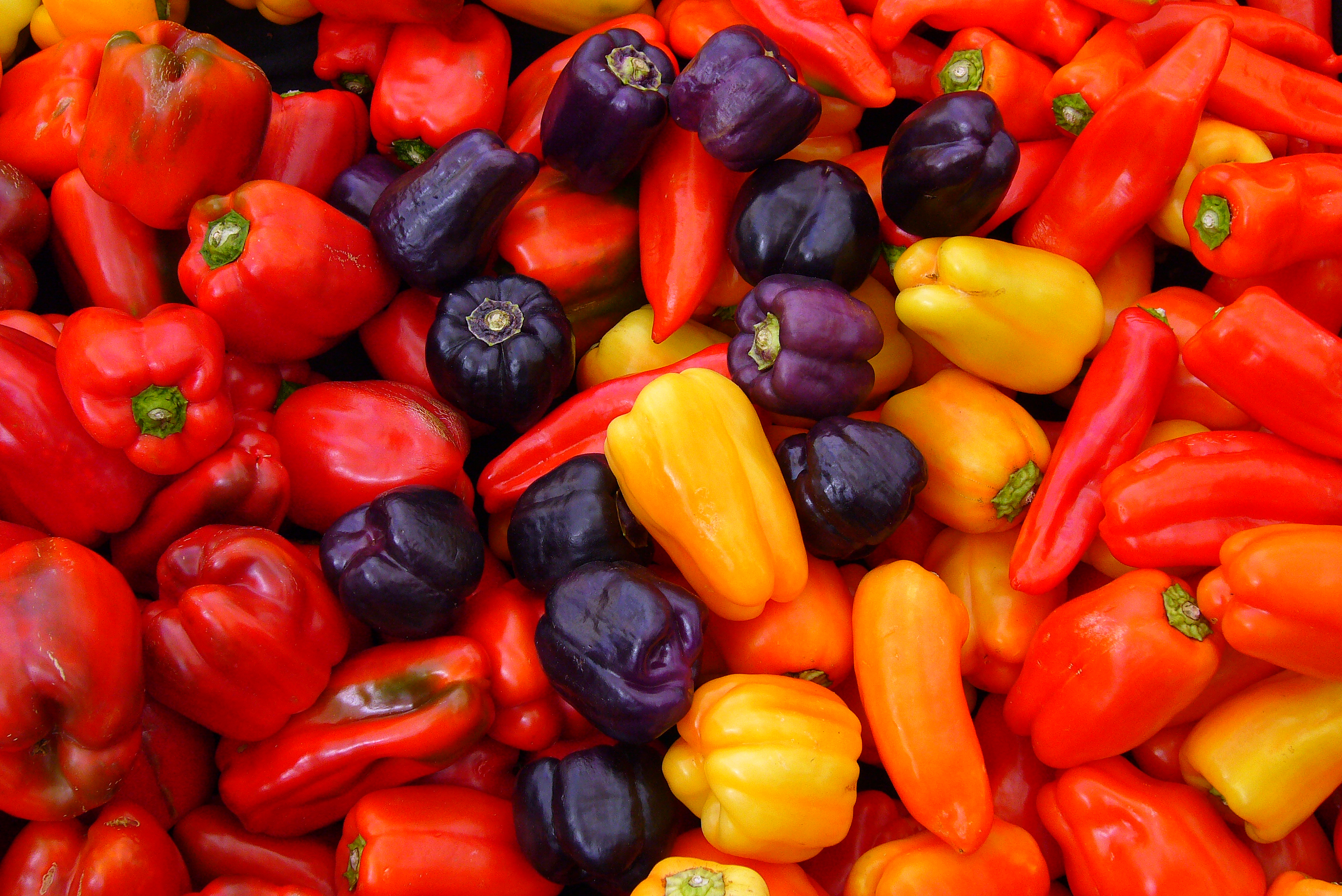
Capsicum annuum cultivars

The name given to the Capsicum fruits varies between English-speaking countries.

In Australia, New Zealand and Indian English, heatless varieties are called "capsicums", while hot ones are called "chilli"/"chillies" (double L). The term "bell peppers" is never used, although in Australia C. annuum and other varieties which have a bell shape and are fairly hot, are often called "bell chillies".

In Canada, Ireland, South Africa and the United Kingdom, the heatless varieties are known simply as "peppers" (or more specifically "green peppers", "red peppers", etc.), while the hot ones are "chilli"/"chillies" (double L) or "chilli peppers".

In the United States, the common heatless varieties are referred to as "bell peppers", "sweet peppers", "red/green/etc. peppers", or simply "peppers", while the hot varieties are collectively called "chile"/"chiles", "chili"/"chilies", or "chili"/"chile peppers" (one L only), "hot peppers", or named as a specific variety (e.g., banana pepper).

The ground spice made from hot capsicums is called paprika in both U.S. English and Commonwealth English. The name derives from Central Europe; in Polish and in Hungarian, the term papryka and paprika (respectively) is used for all kinds of capsicums and the spice made from them.

== Pictures of common cultivars ==
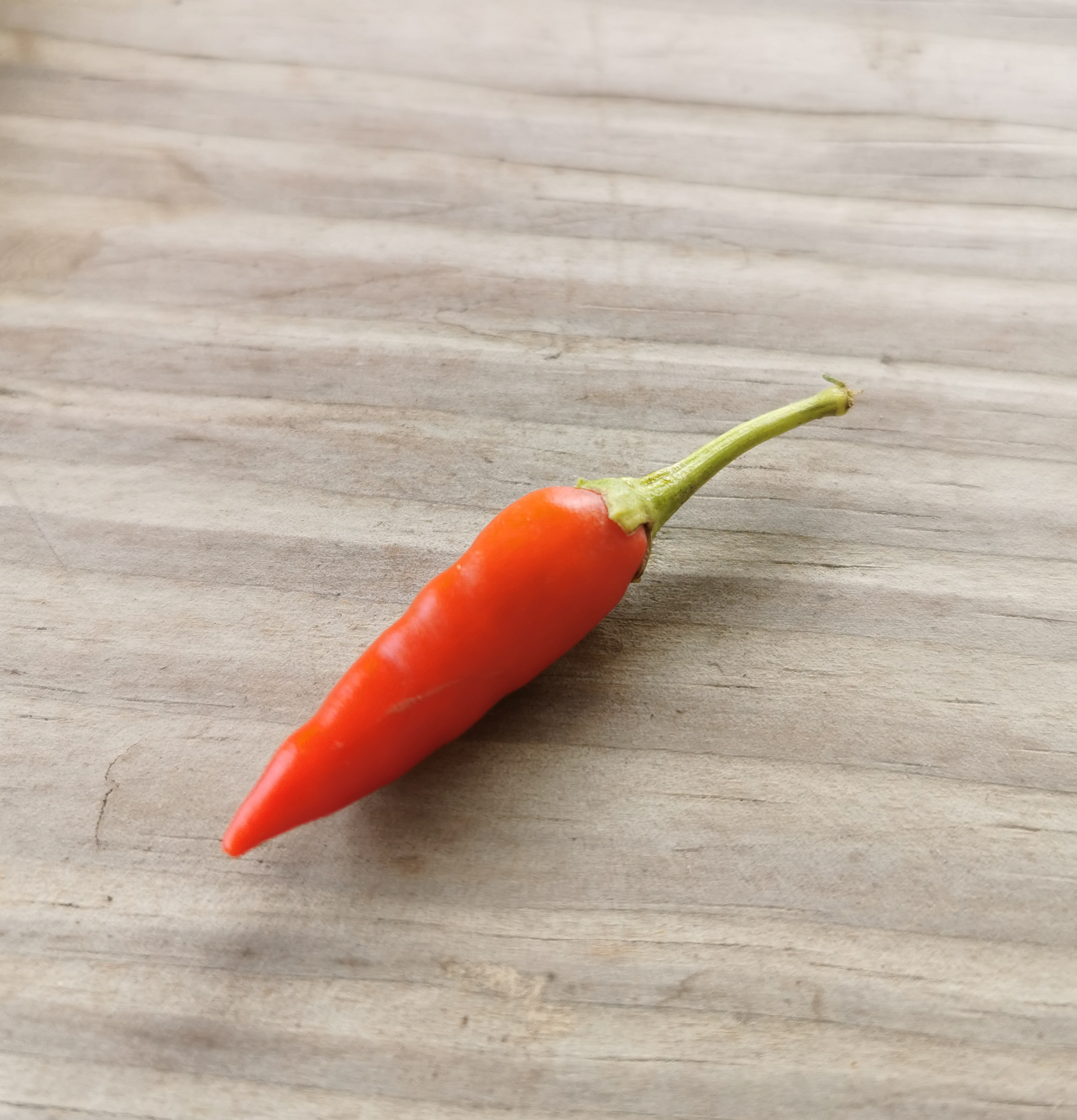
Capsicum annum L. var. fasciculatum Irish.

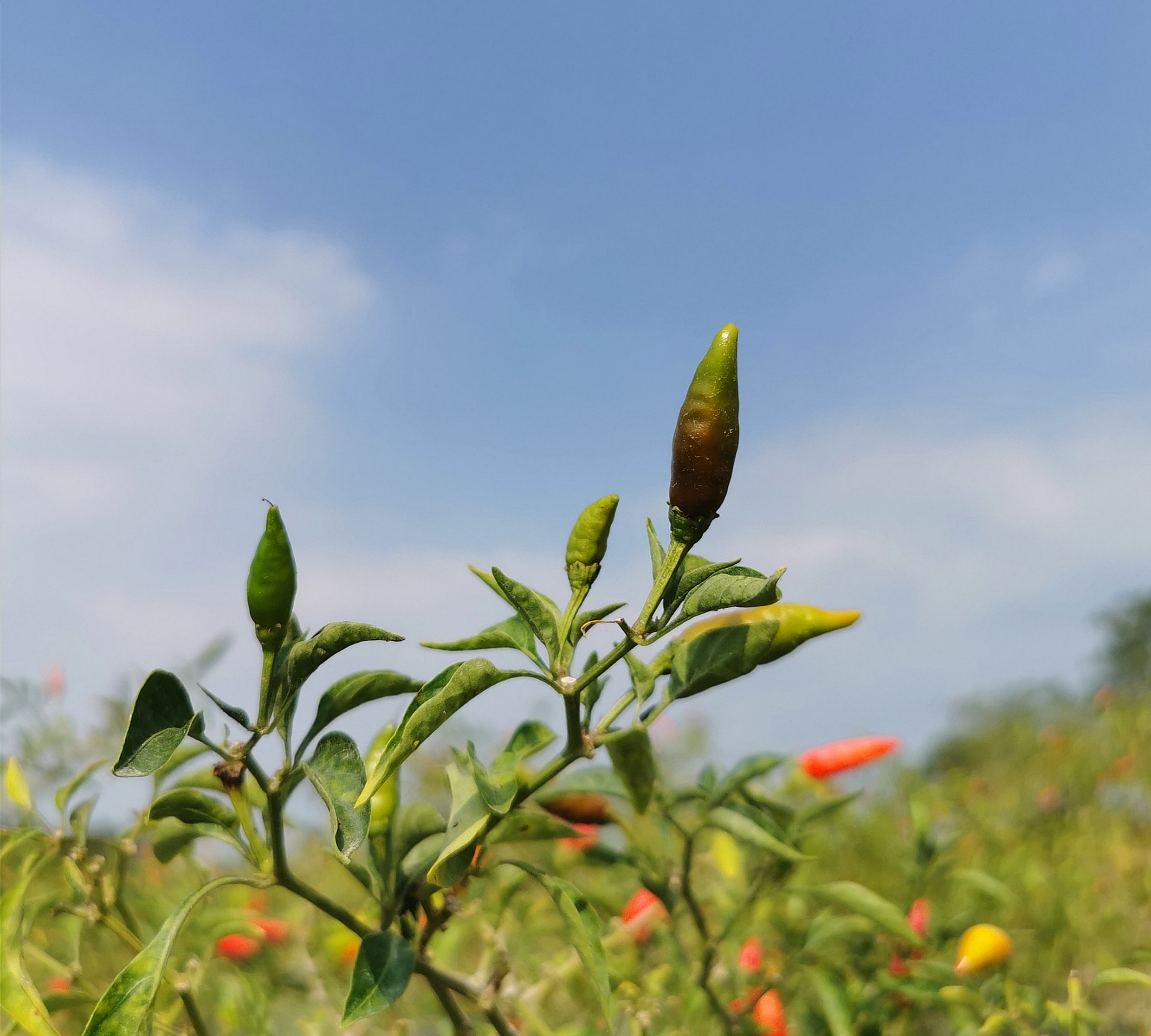
Capsicum annum L. var. fasciculatum Irish.

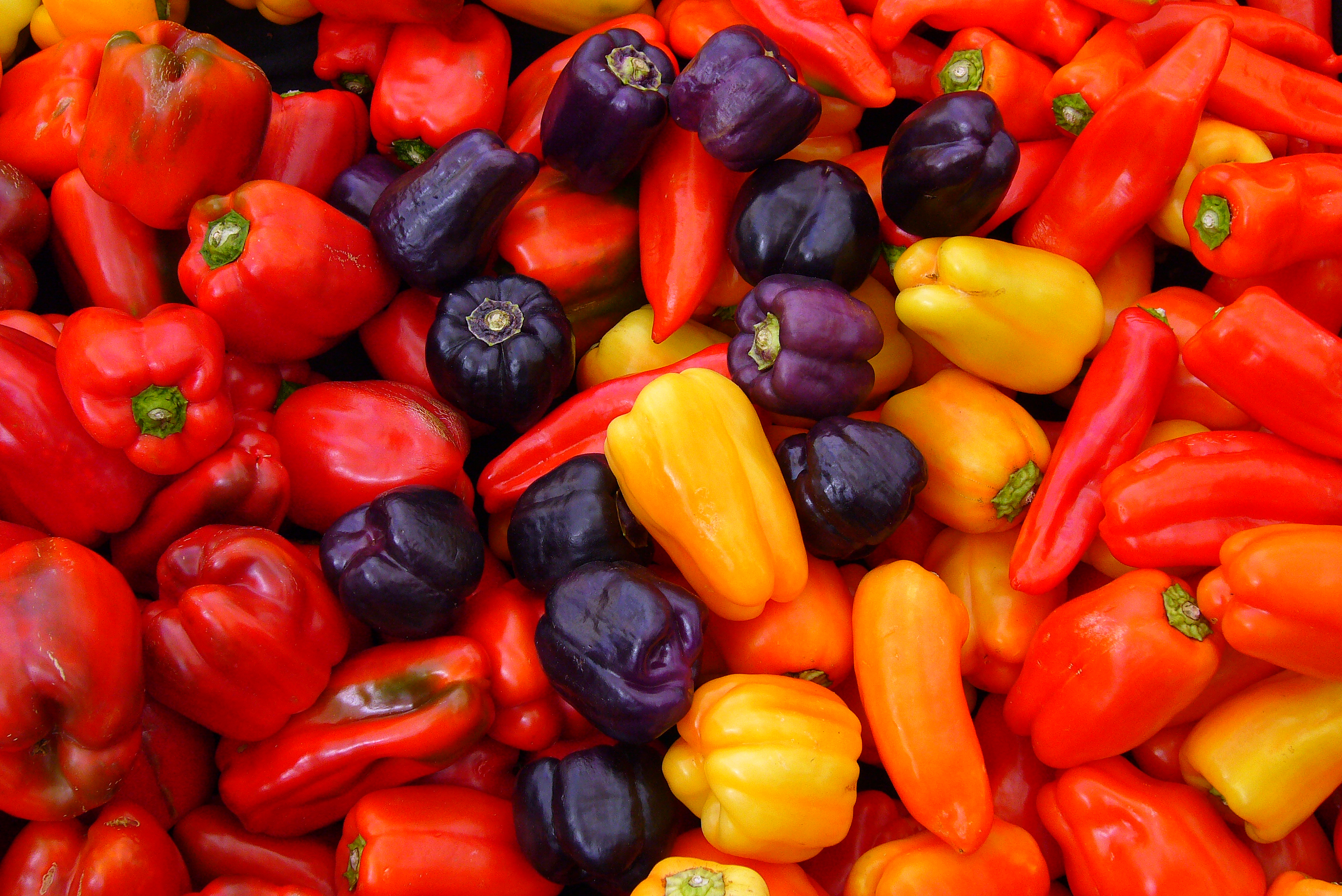
C. annuum cultivars

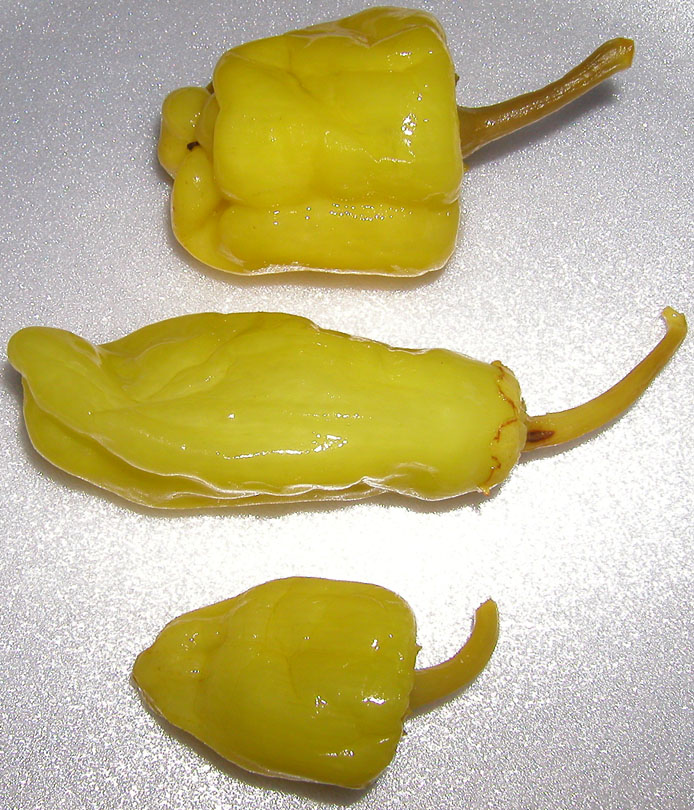
Peperoncini (C. annuum)

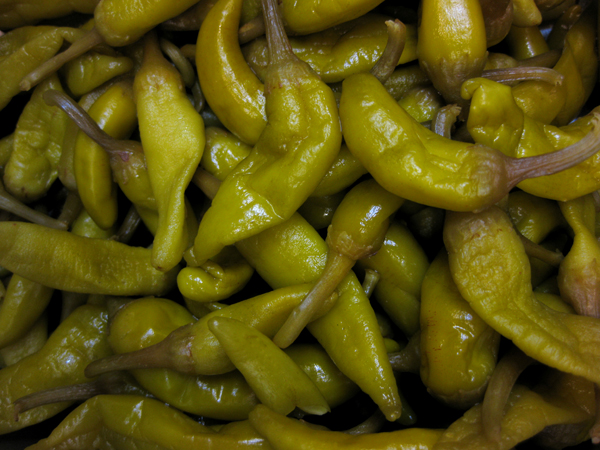
Peperoncini in kebab restaurant

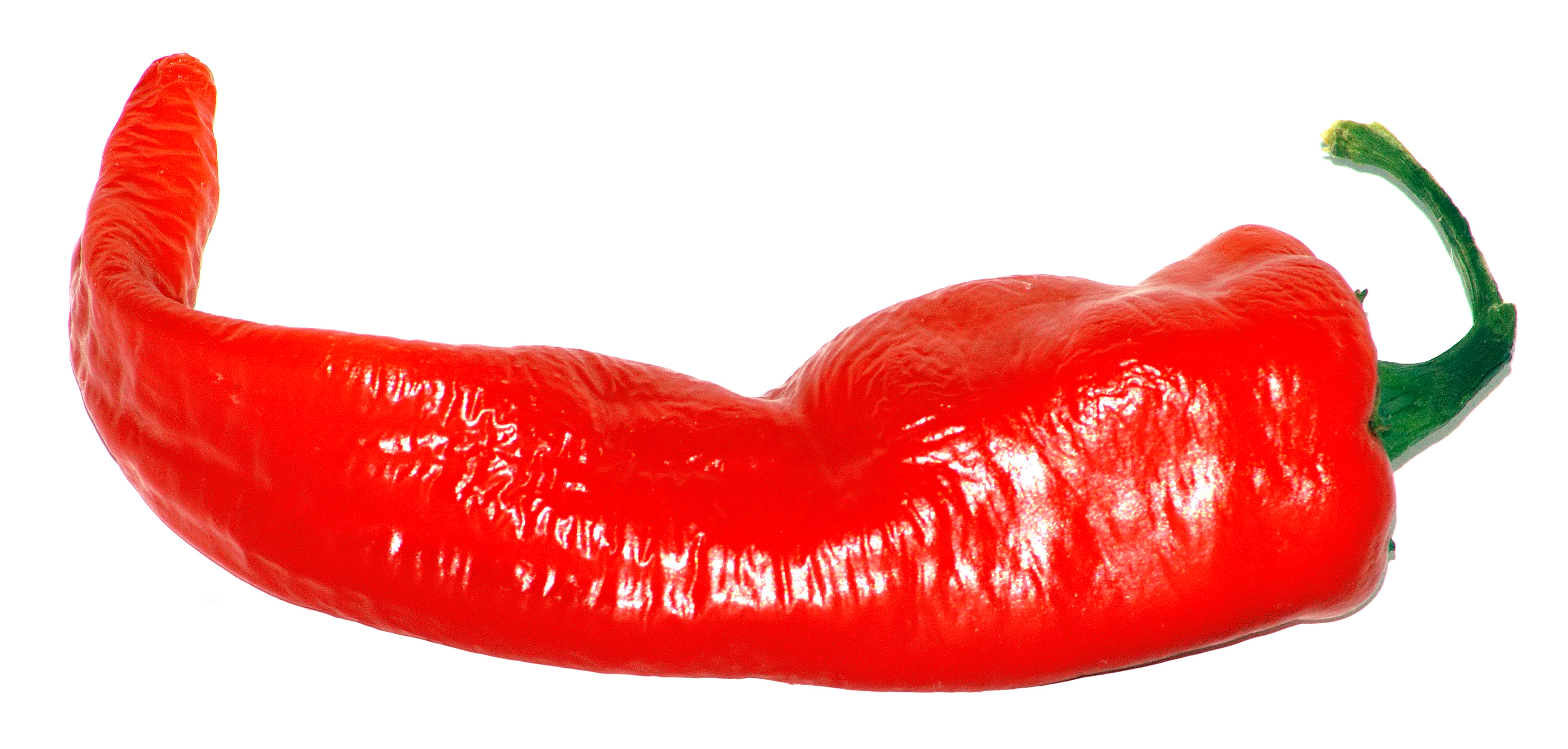
Cayenne pepper (C. annuum)

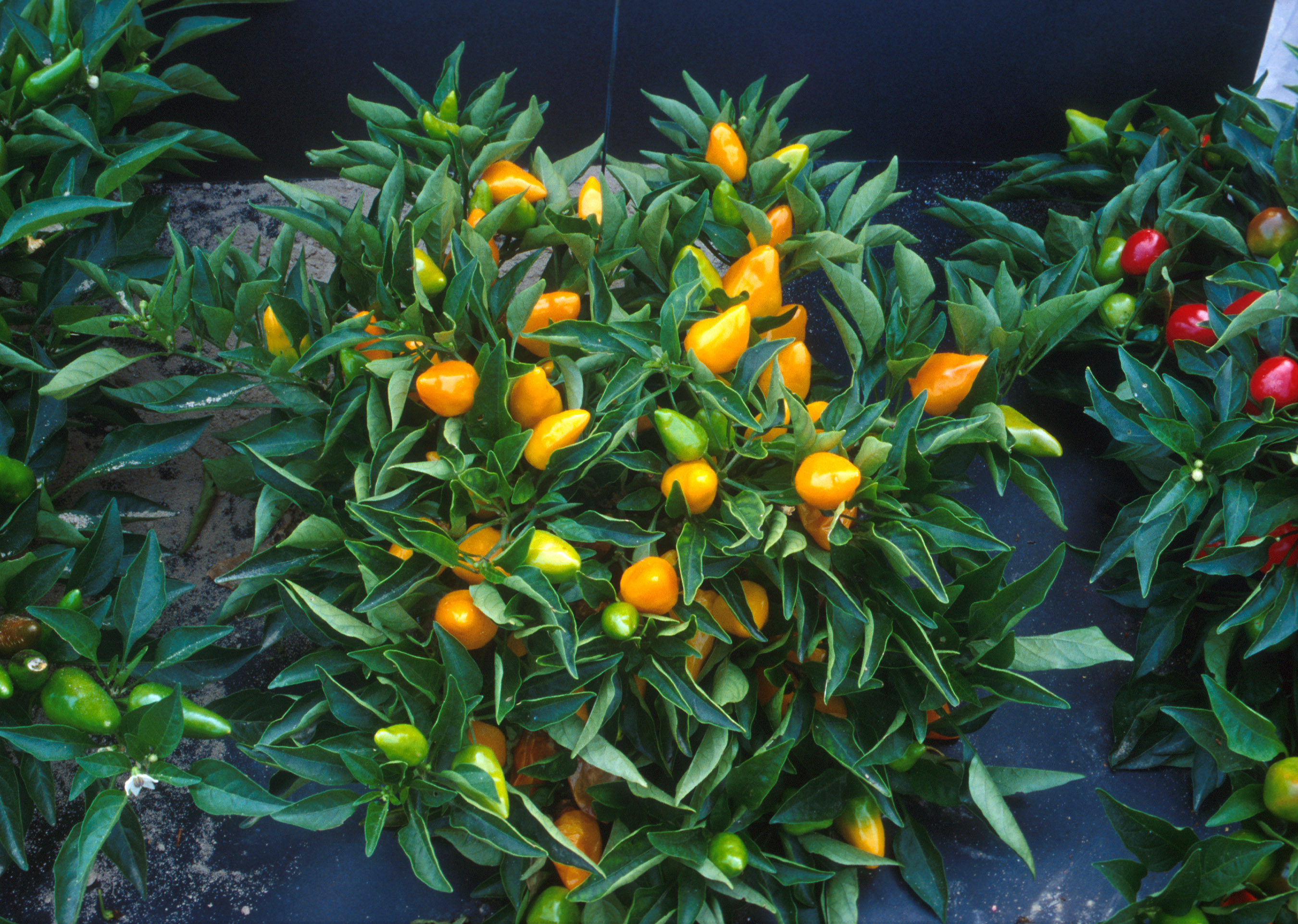
Compact plant of orange Capsicum

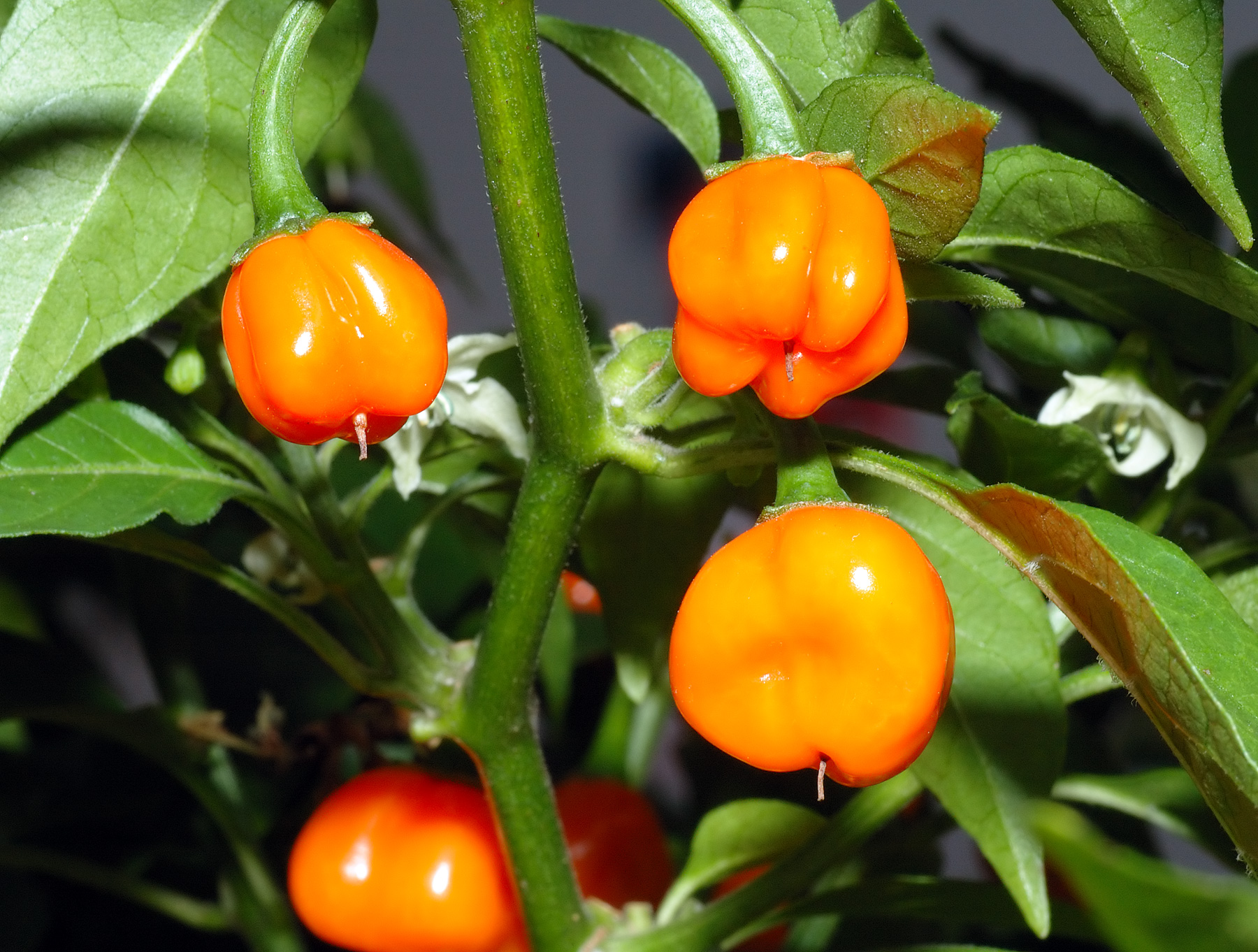
Habanero chili (C. chinense Jacquin)- plant with flower and fruit

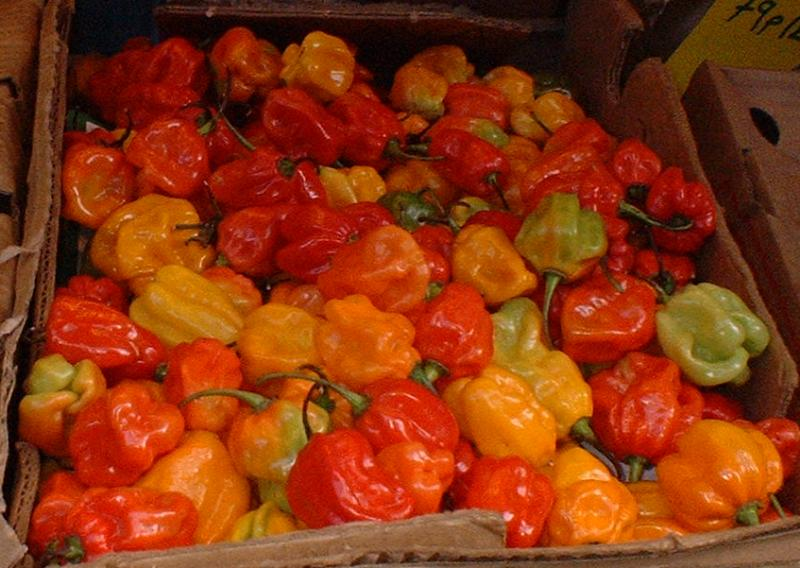
Scotch bonnet (C. chinense) in a Caribbean market

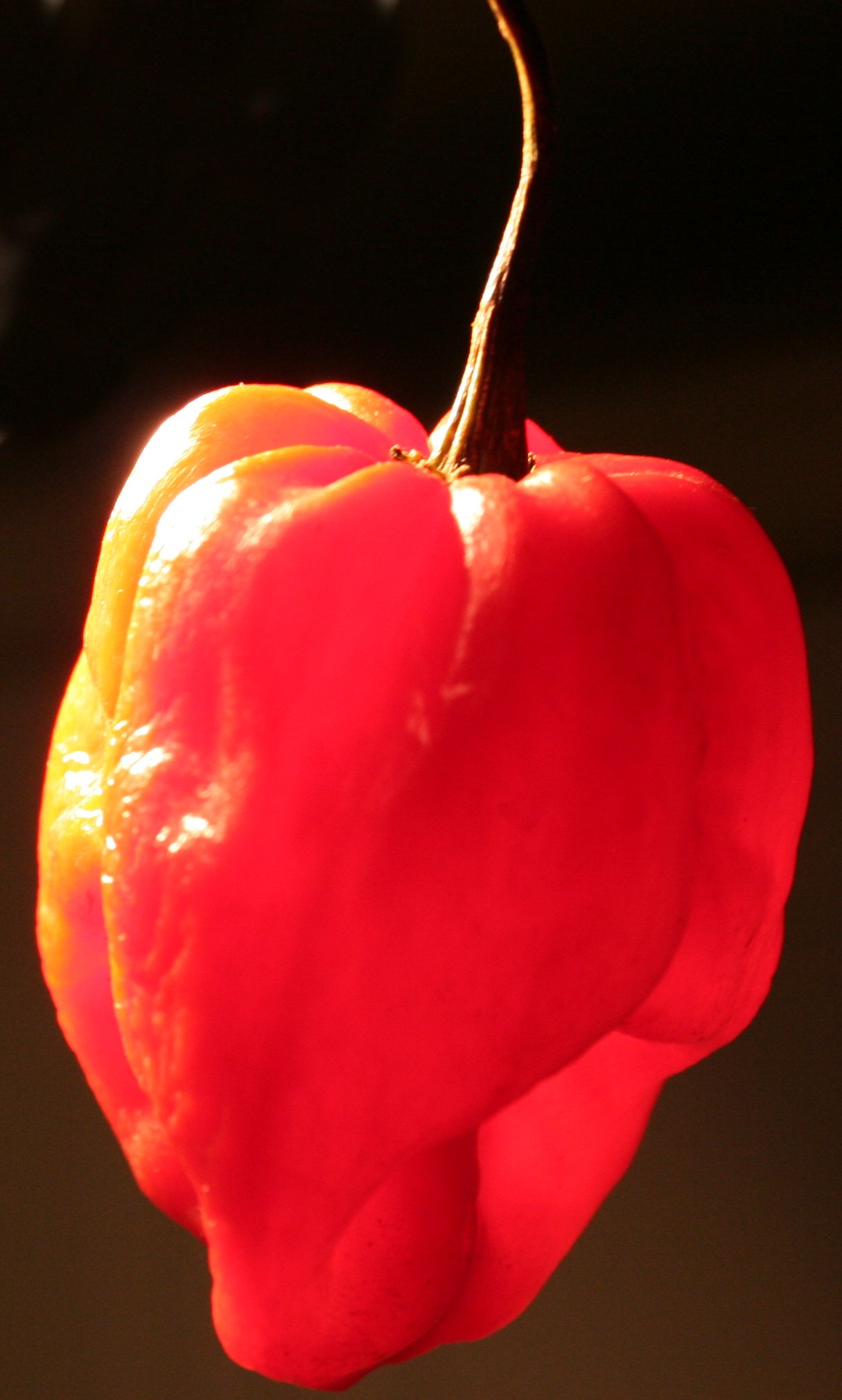
Scotch bonnet

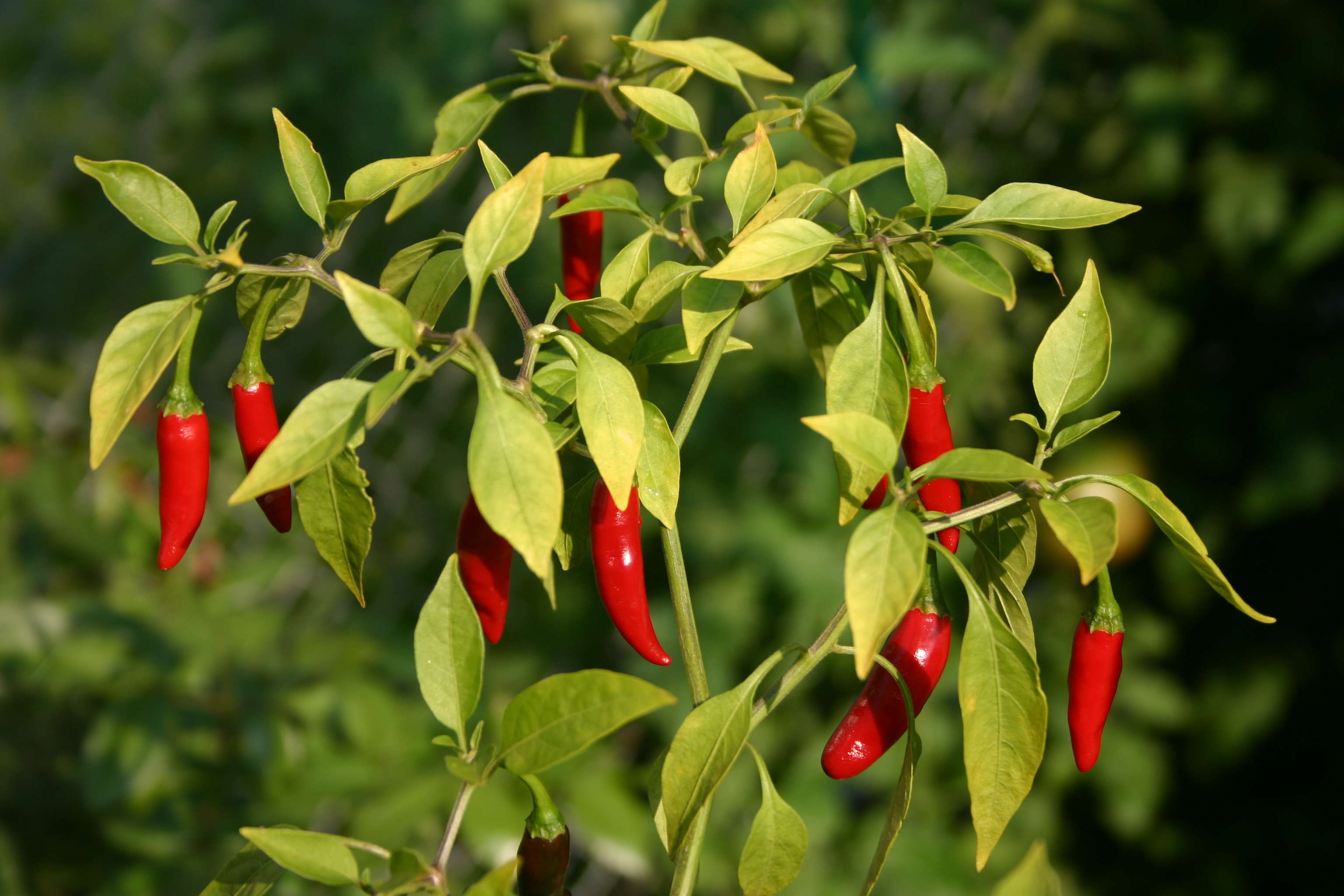
Thai peppers (C. annuum)

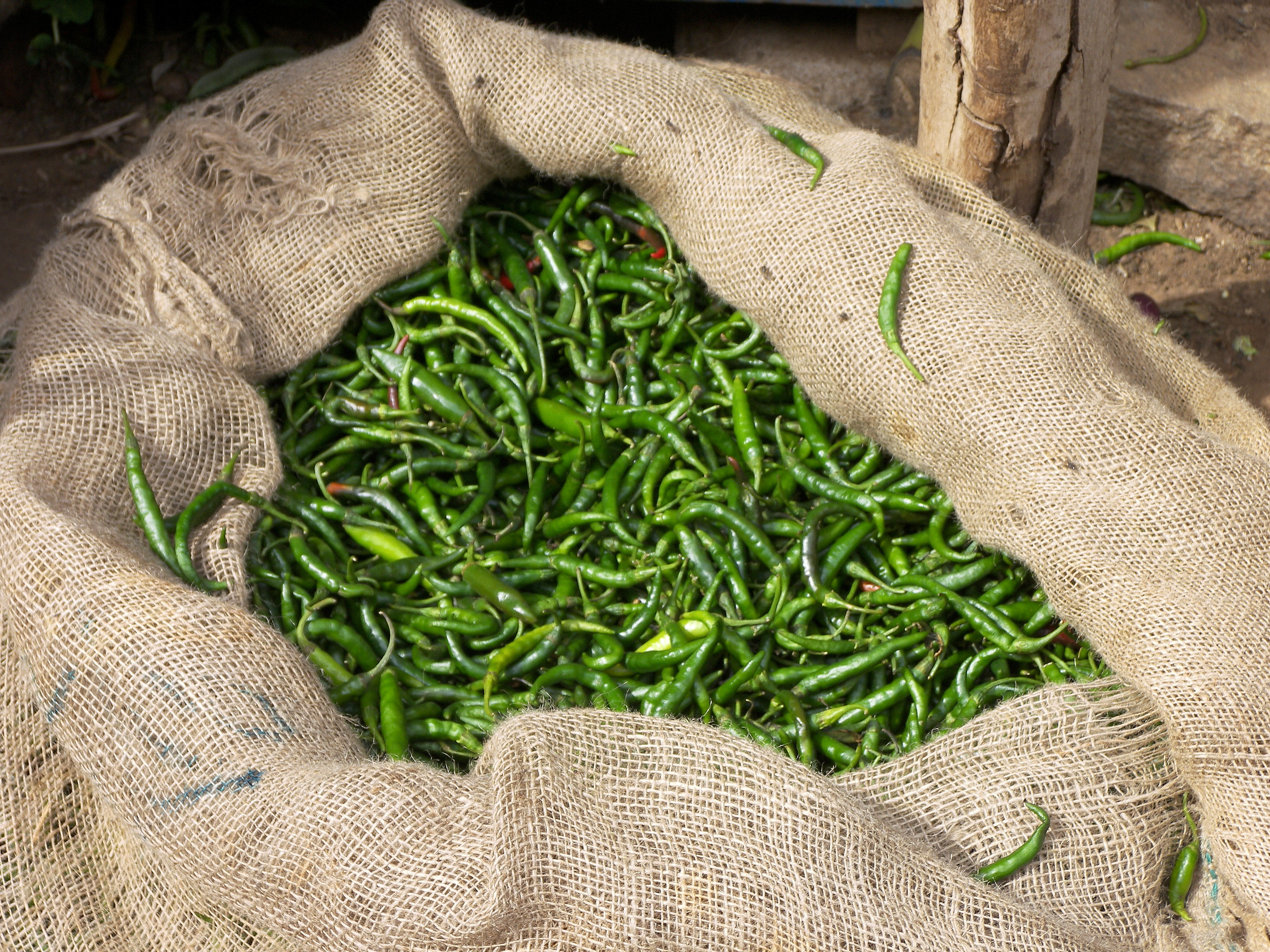
Fresh Indian green chillies in Bangalore market

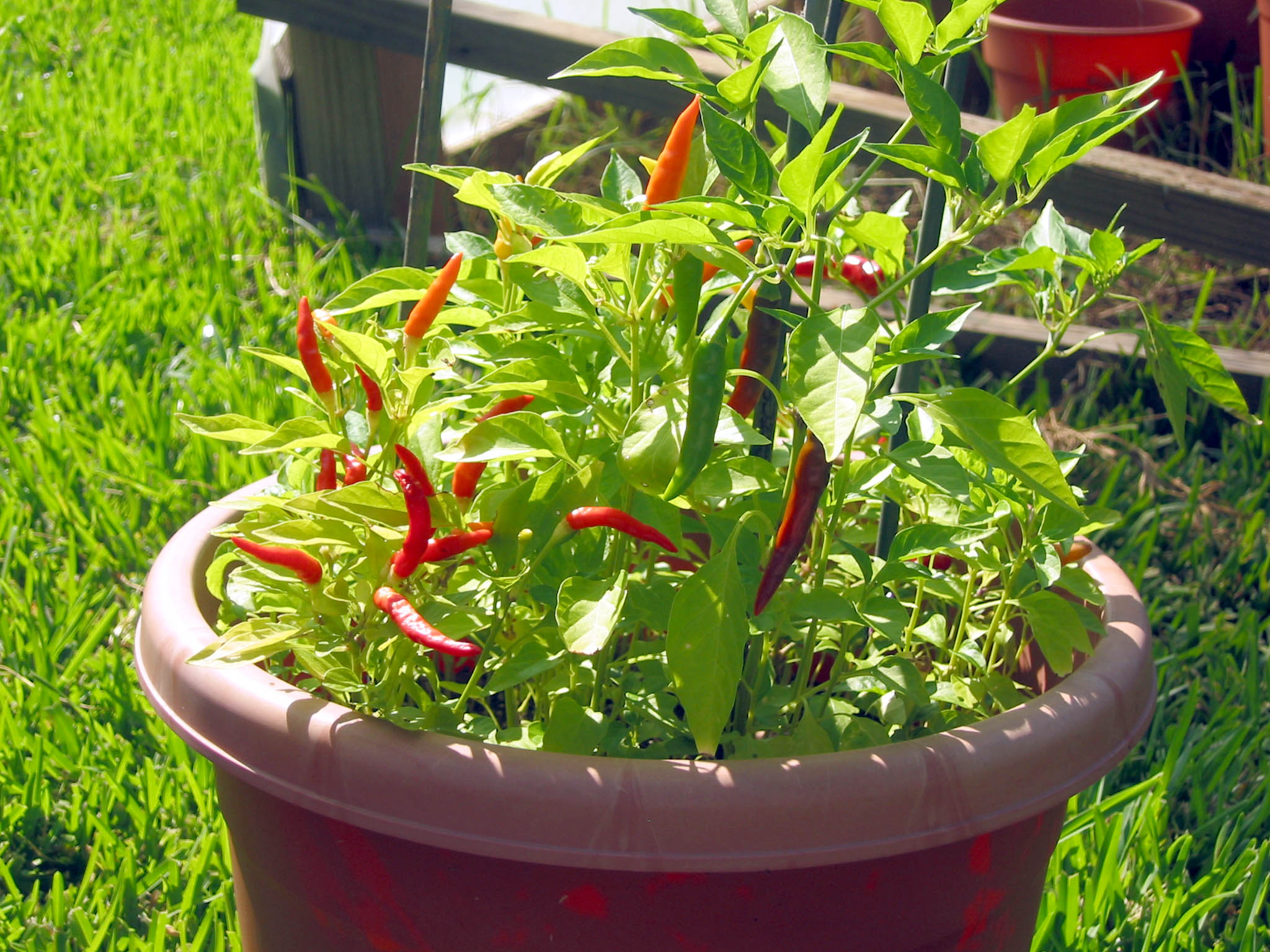
Piri piri (C. frutescens 'African Devil')

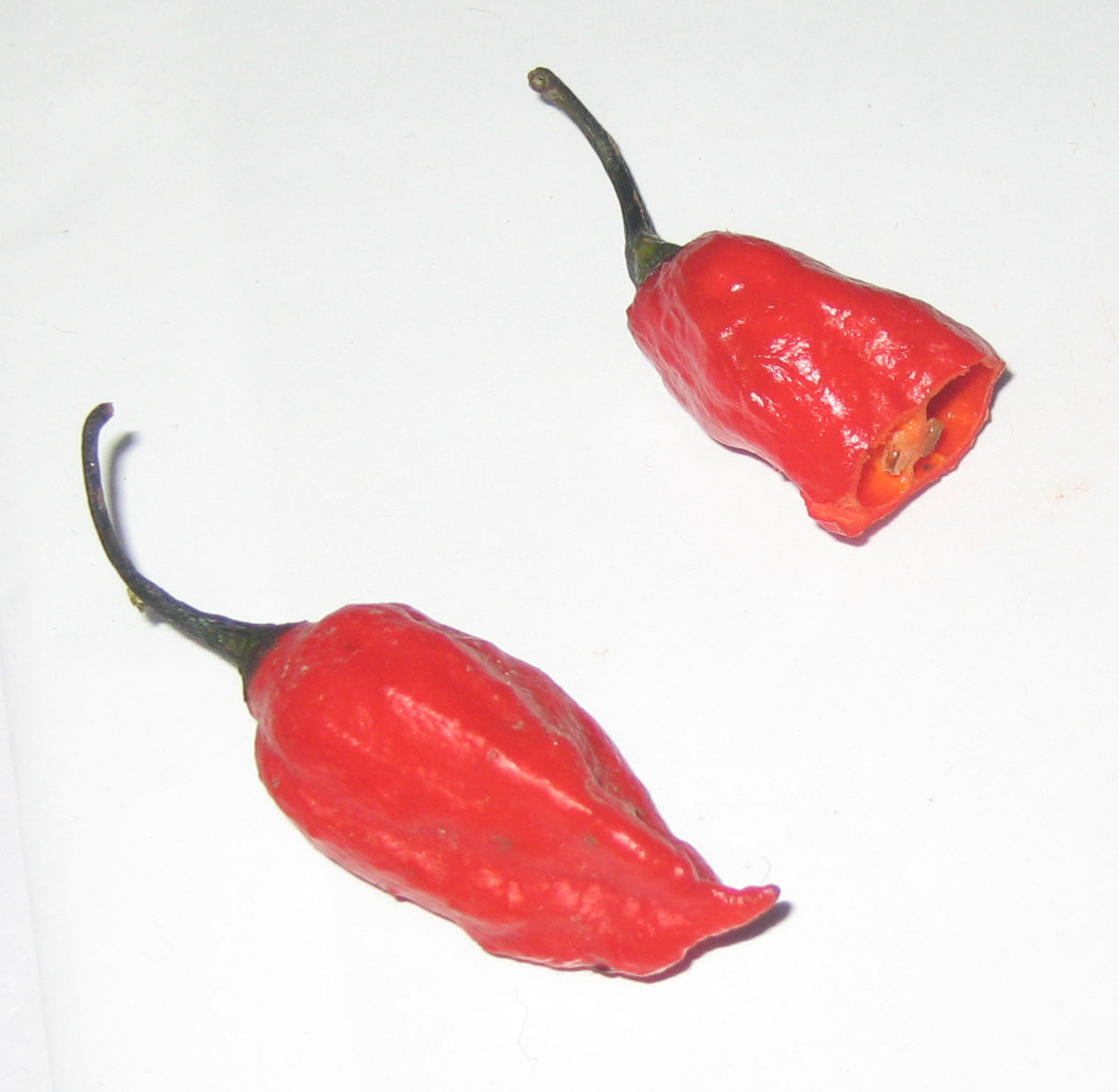
Naga jolokia Chilli (bhut jolokia) (C. chinense x C. frutescens)

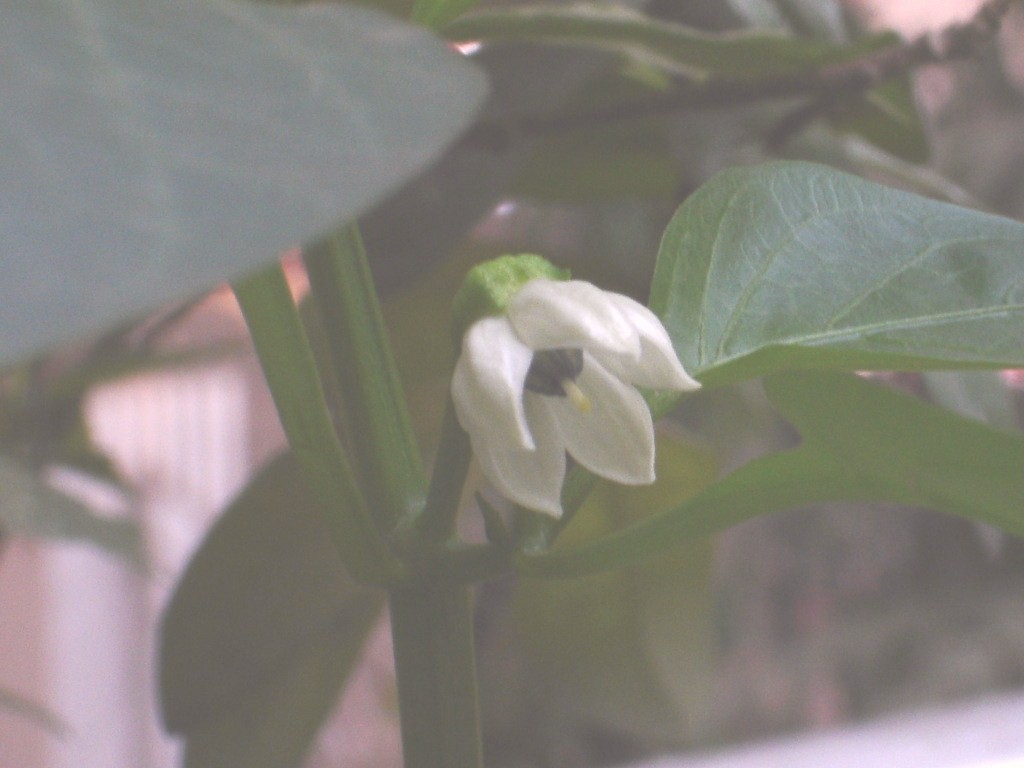
C. annuum flower

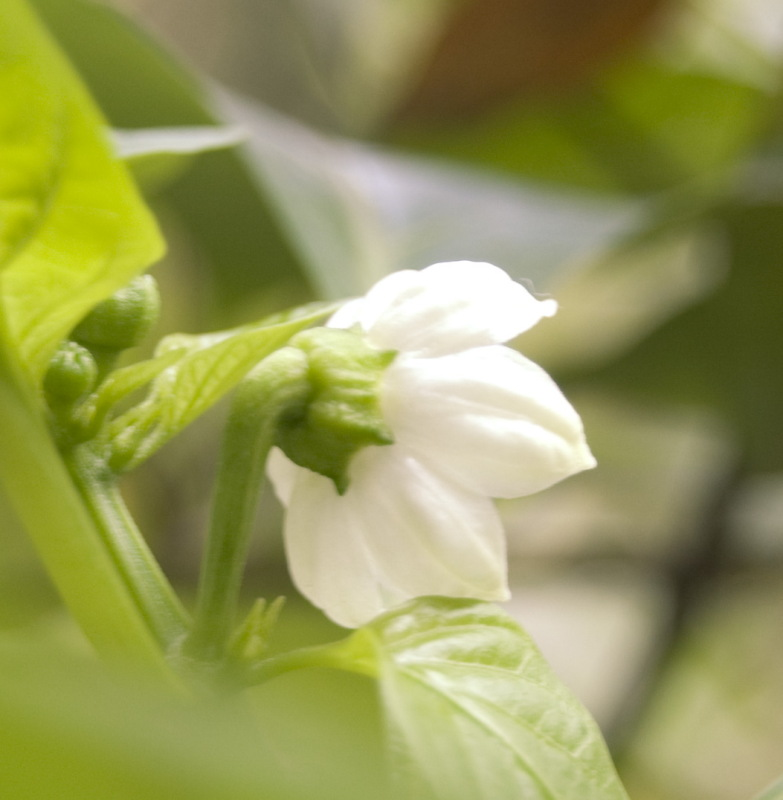
C. annum flower close up

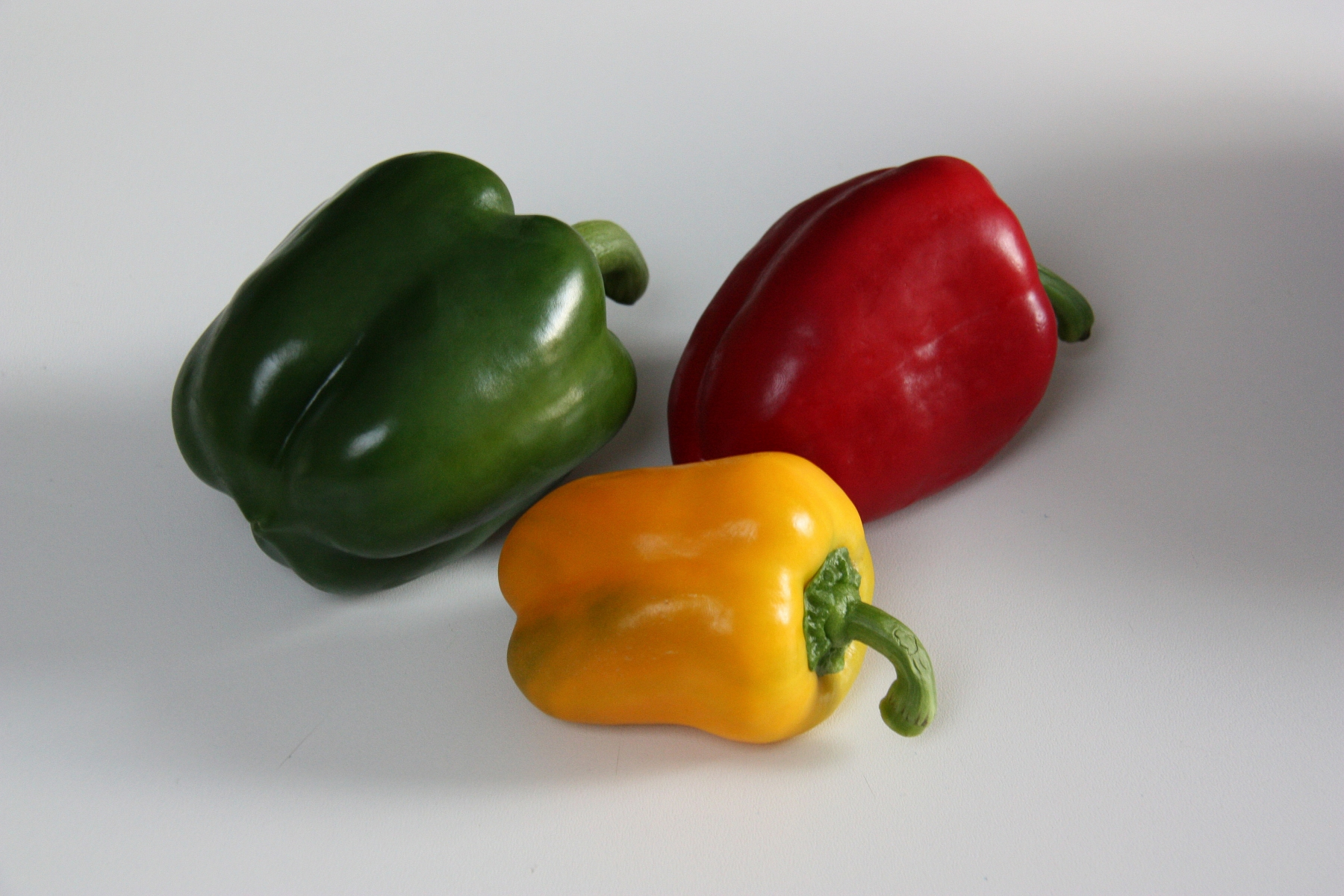
Green, yellow, and red capsicum

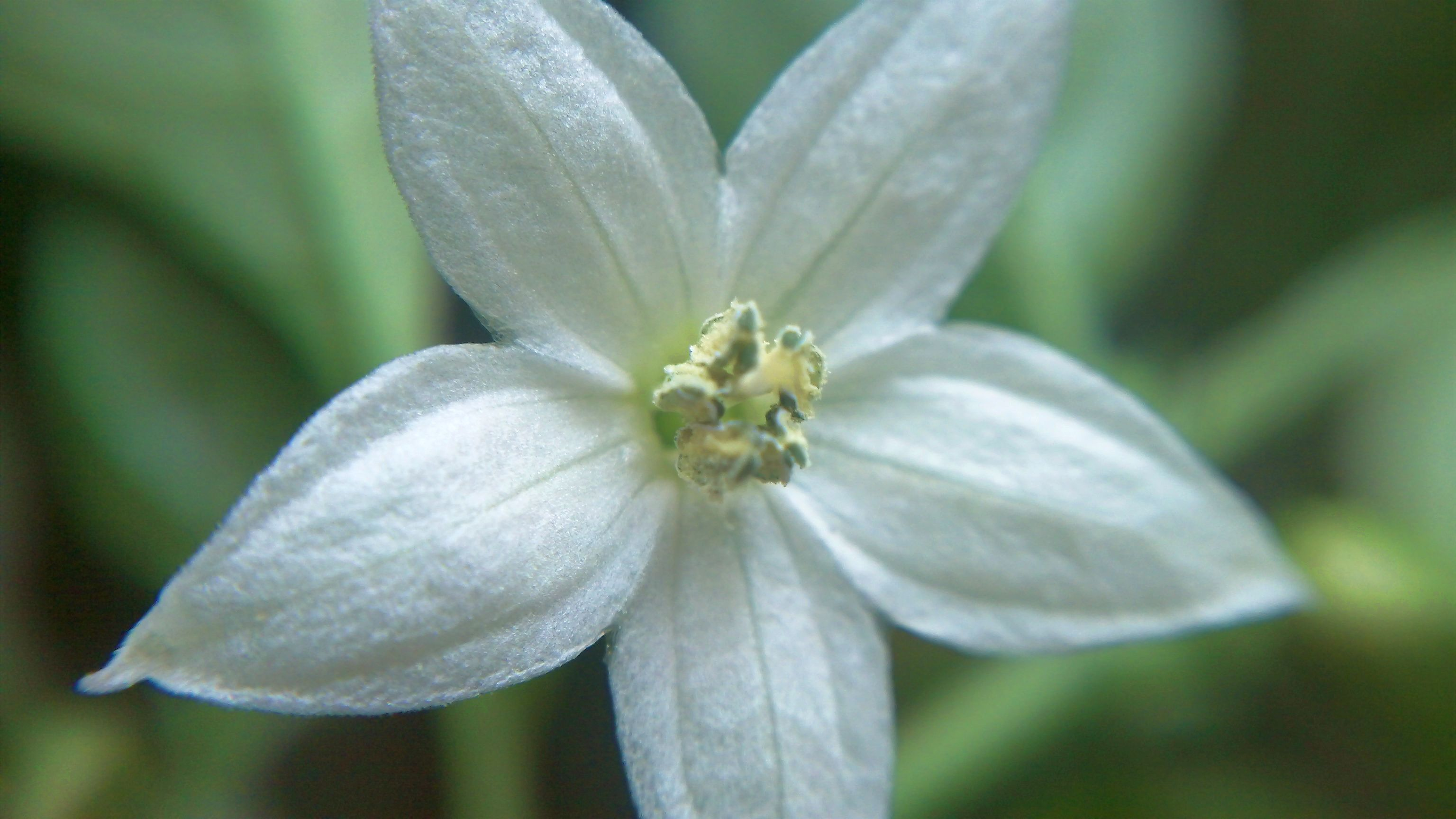
The flower of red hot bangi pepper, Malaysia

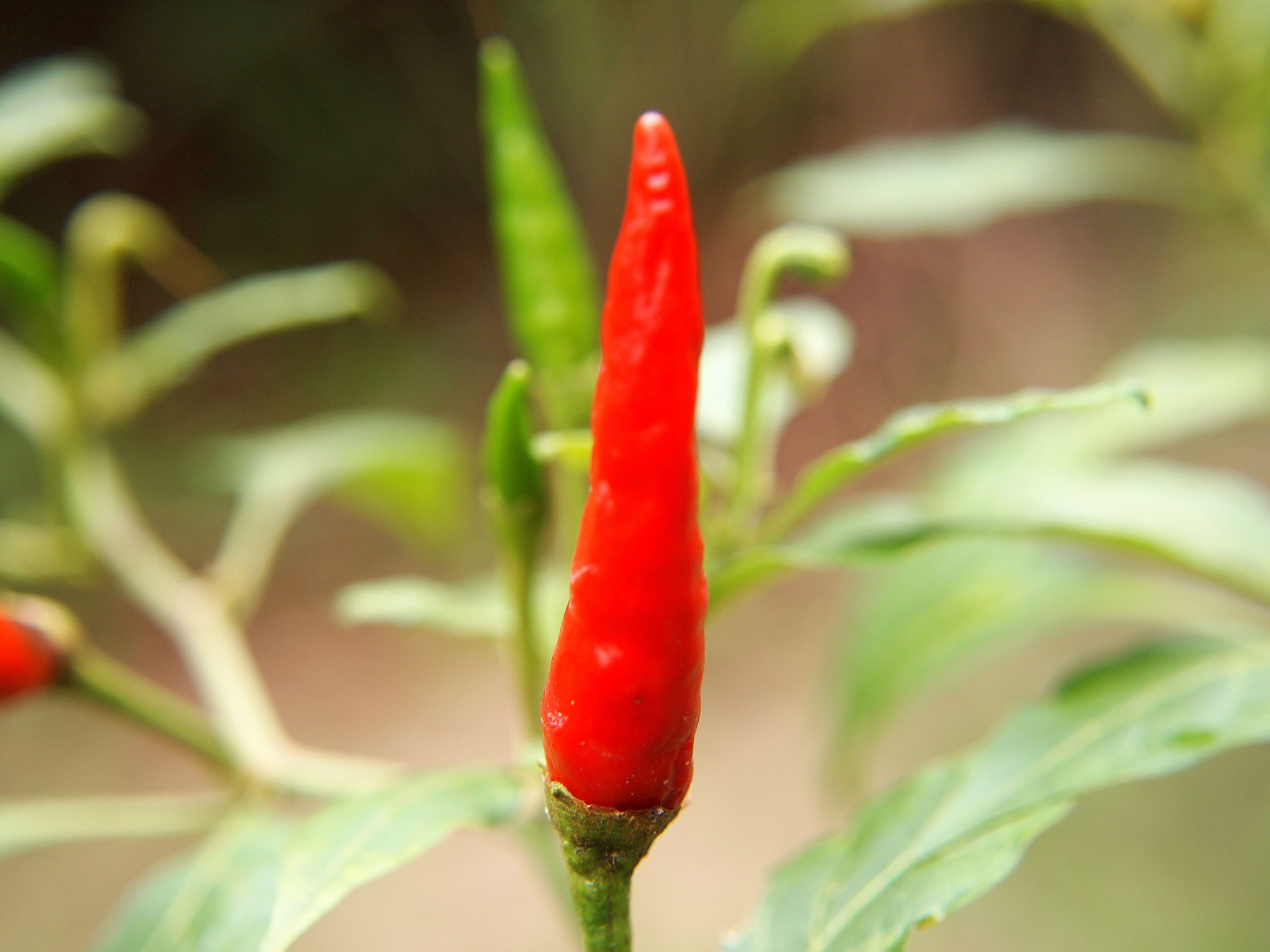
A small but very hot Capsicum in Malaysia

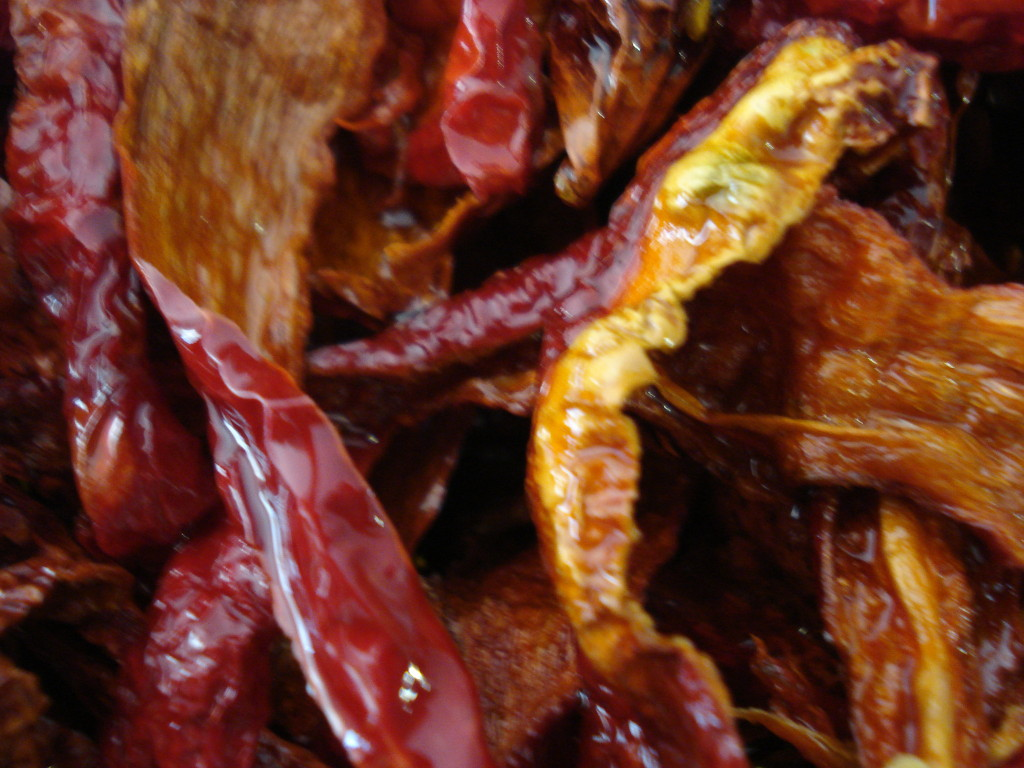
Peperoni cruschi, dried and crispy Capsicum from Basilicata

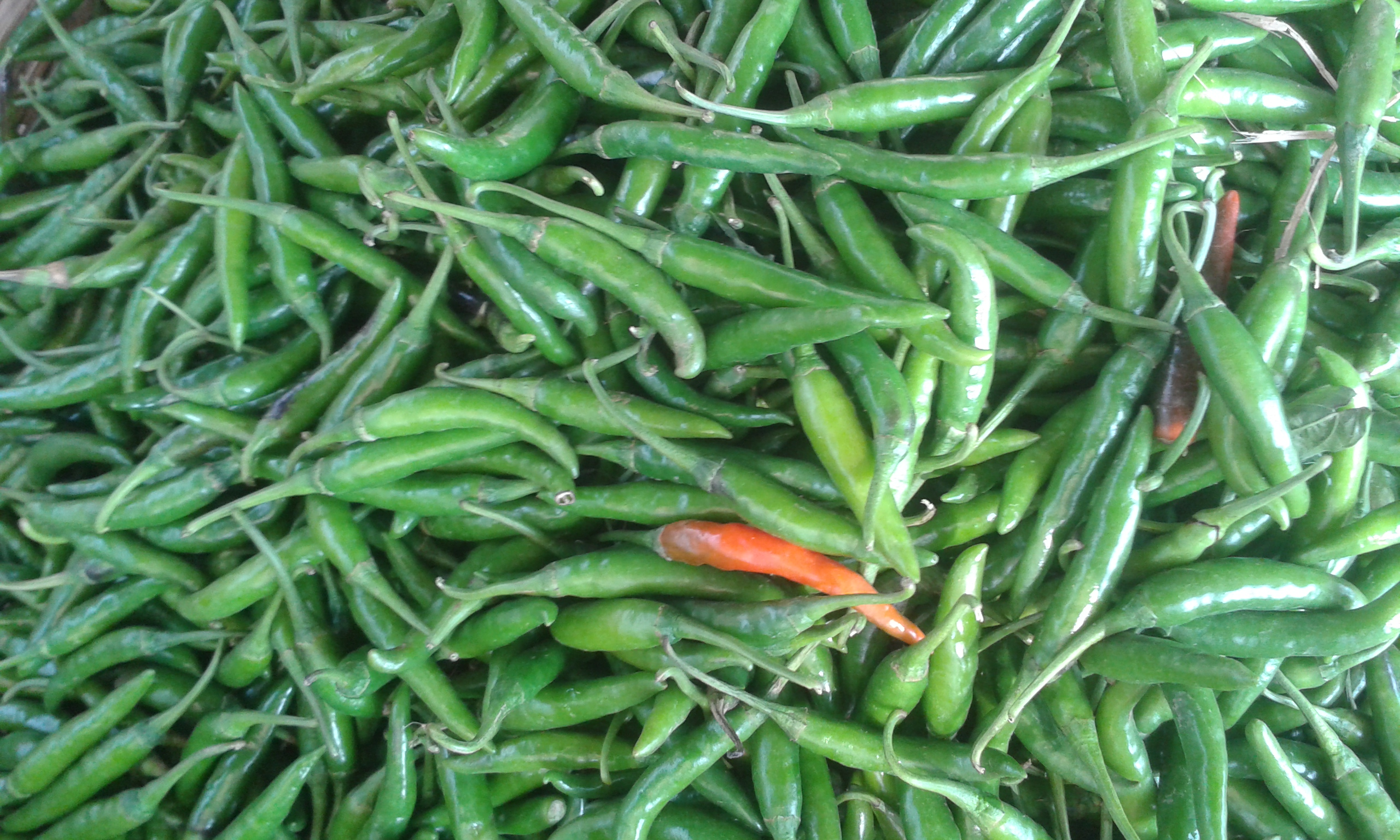
Capsicum in Bangladesh

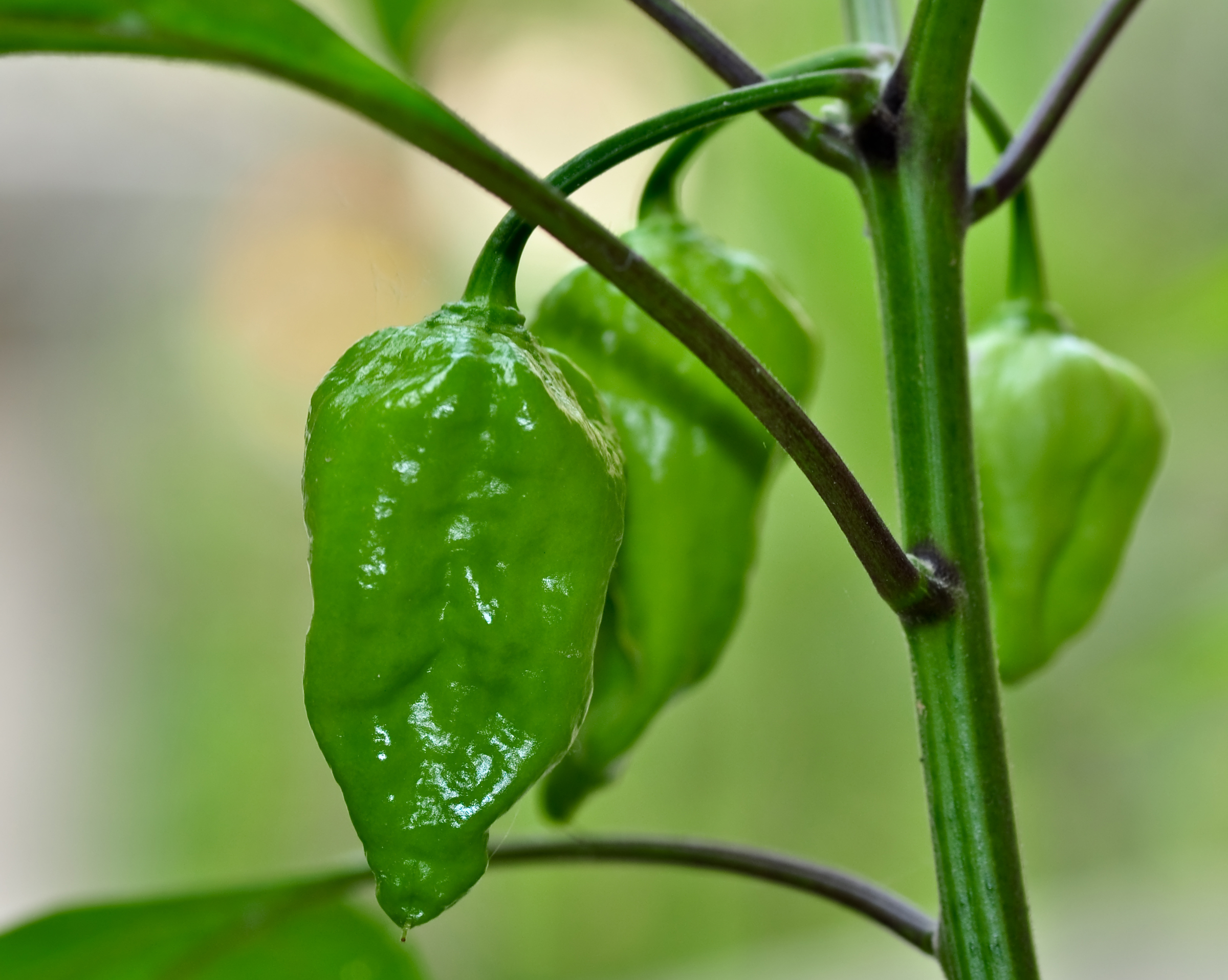
Naga Morich in Bangladesh

== See also ==
- Pepper classification
- List of Capsicum cultivars
- List of vegetables
- New Mexico chile
- Pimento
- Scoville scale
