= Capsicum caatingae =

Conservation status
- Least Concern (IUCN 3.1)

Scientific classification
- Kingdom: Plantae
- Clade: Tracheophytes
- Clade: Angiosperms
- Clade: Eudicots
- Clade: Asterids
- Order: Solanales
- Family: Solanaceae
- Genus: Capsicum
- Species: C. caatingae

Binomial name
- Capsicum caatingae Barboza & Agra

Species of wild chili pepper

Capsicum caatingae, commonly known as pimenta brava, is a species of wild chili pepper in the nightshade family Solanaceae. It is a shrub native to eastern Brazil. It was described by Gloria E. Barboza and Maria de Fátima Agra in 2011, and is treated in the 2022 monograph of the genus Capsicum by Barboza and colleagues.

== Description ==
A small tree or erect shrub 2–4 m tall (occasionally to 6 m), with a thick main stem 2.5–5 cm across at the base and slender or scrambling branches. The leaves are membranous to papery, ovate to elliptic, the larger blades 4–11.5 cm long (rarely to 20 cm).

== Distribution and habitat ==
It is native to northeastern Brazil, ranging south to northern Minas Gerais, where it grows in a seasonally dry tropical climate.
