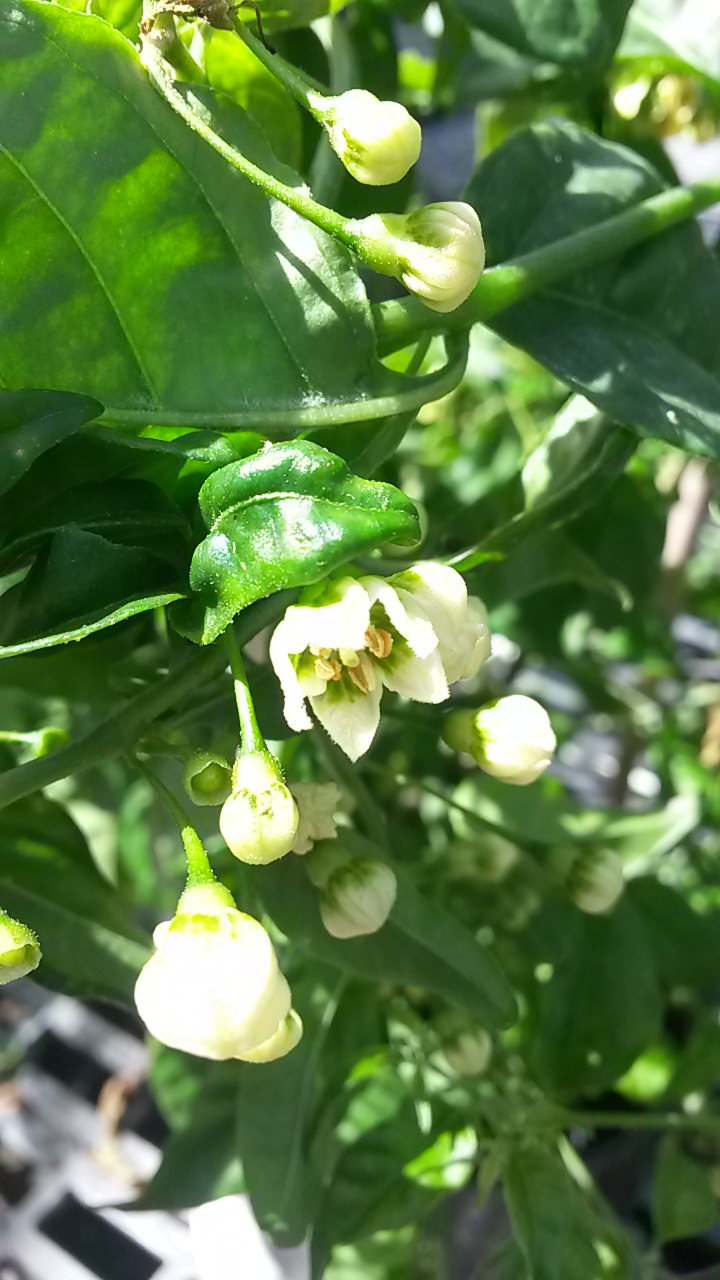
- Capsicum flexuosum at flowering

Scientific classification
- Kingdom: Plantae
- Clade: Tracheophytes
- Clade: Angiosperms
- Clade: Eudicots
- Clade: Asterids
- Order: Solanales
- Family: Solanaceae
- Genus: Capsicum
- Species: C. flexuosum

Binomial name
- Capsicum flexuosum Hunz

= Capsicum flexuosum =

Species of flowering plant

Capsicum flexuosum is a member of the genus Capsicum, and is native to the New World, specifically the southern regions of Brazil. Unlike most other chili peppers, it is only mildly pungent and has issues with self-compatibility.

== Plant description ==
Capsicum flexuosum is identified by its distinctive white, green, and sometimes purple flowers. The flowers have an entire calyx and campanulate corolla that come in various color varieties, but are generally green toward the center changing to white at the petal edges . Mature fruit of C. flexuosum are tiny berries with a bullet shape about 7 mm long that ripen to red. It is propagated by seed. It has a somatic chromosome number of 2n=2x=24.

== Uses ==
In Brazil, where the plants occur naturally, C. flexusoum is sometimes used as a spice. Also, since it is a wild pepper species, it has been used extensively in phylogenetic studies to better understand the relationships of peppers and different gene models. This species has also been used as a "bridge species" to cross more distantly related Capsicum species to those more related to domesticated cultivars.
