= Capsicum caballeroi =

Scientific classification
- Kingdom: Plantae
- Clade: Tracheophytes
- Clade: Angiosperms
- Clade: Eudicots
- Clade: Asterids
- Order: Solanales
- Family: Solanaceae
- Genus: Capsicum
- Species: C. caballeroi

Binomial name
- Capsicum caballeroi M.Nee

Species of flowering plant

Capsicum caballeroi is a species of pepper from the genus Capsicum, native to the northeastern departments of Bolivia in Santa Cruz and Cochabamba. Alternative names include ají de monta and ulupica de yunga . It was first described by Michael Nee in late 2006.
