= Capsicum hunzikerianum =

Scientific classification
- Kingdom: Plantae
- Clade: Tracheophytes
- Clade: Angiosperms
- Clade: Eudicots
- Clade: Asterids
- Order: Solanales
- Family: Solanaceae
- Genus: Capsicum
- Species: C. hunzikerianum

Binomial name
- Capsicum hunzikerianum Barboza & Bianch.

Species of wild chili pepper

Capsicum hunzikerianum is a species of wild chili pepper in the nightshade family Solanaceae, native to southeastern Brazil. It was described by Gloria E. Barboza and Luciano de Bem Bianchetti in 2005, and is one of the wild species of Capsicum treated in the 2022 monograph of the genus by Barboza and colleagues.

== Description ==
A robust, erect, leafy shrub 1–3 m tall; the young stems are green with violet spots and hairless. The leaves are leathery, hairless and glossy, ovate to elliptic, the larger blades 9.5–20 cm long (up to 25 cm). Flowers are borne two to four per leaf axil on stalks 20–38 mm long.

== Distribution and habitat ==
It is native to southeastern São Paulo state in southeastern Brazil, where it grows in a wet tropical climate.
