= Capsicum pereirae =

Scientific classification
- Kingdom: Plantae
- Clade: Tracheophytes
- Clade: Angiosperms
- Clade: Eudicots
- Clade: Asterids
- Order: Solanales
- Family: Solanaceae
- Genus: Capsicum
- Species: C. pereirae

Binomial name
- Capsicum pereirae Barboza & Bianch.

Species of wild chili pepper

Capsicum pereirae is a species of wild chili pepper in the nightshade family Solanaceae, native to eastern Brazil. It was described by Gloria E. Barboza and Luciano de Bem Bianchetti in 2005, and is treated in the 2022 monograph of the genus Capsicum by Barboza and colleagues.

== Description ==
An erect shrub commonly 0.8–3 m tall, the slender branches horizontal in a zig-zag pattern; the young stems are green mottled with white. The leaves are leathery, hairless, elliptic, the larger blades 9–15 cm long, with the veins beneath mottled white. Flowers are borne two to six per leaf axil on stalks 15–30 mm long.

== Distribution and habitat ==
It is native to eastern Brazil, where it grows in a wet tropical climate.
