= Capsicum neei =

Scientific classification
- Kingdom: Plantae
- Clade: Tracheophytes
- Clade: Angiosperms
- Clade: Eudicots
- Clade: Asterids
- Order: Solanales
- Family: Solanaceae
- Genus: Capsicum
- Species: C. neei

Binomial name
- Capsicum neei Barboza & X.Reyes

Species of wild chili pepper

Capsicum neei is a species of wild chili pepper in the nightshade family Solanaceae, native to Bolivia. It was described by Gloria E. Barboza and Ximena Reyes in 2019, and is treated in the 2022 monograph of the genus Capsicum by Barboza and colleagues.

== Description ==
A low, erect shrub 0.70–2 m tall (rarely to 3 m), loosely branched with thin branches. The leaves are membranous, elliptic or ovate, the larger blades about 6.7–11 cm long. Flowers are borne two to four per leaf axil.

== Distribution and habitat ==
It is native to central and southern Bolivia, where it grows in a seasonally dry tropical climate.
