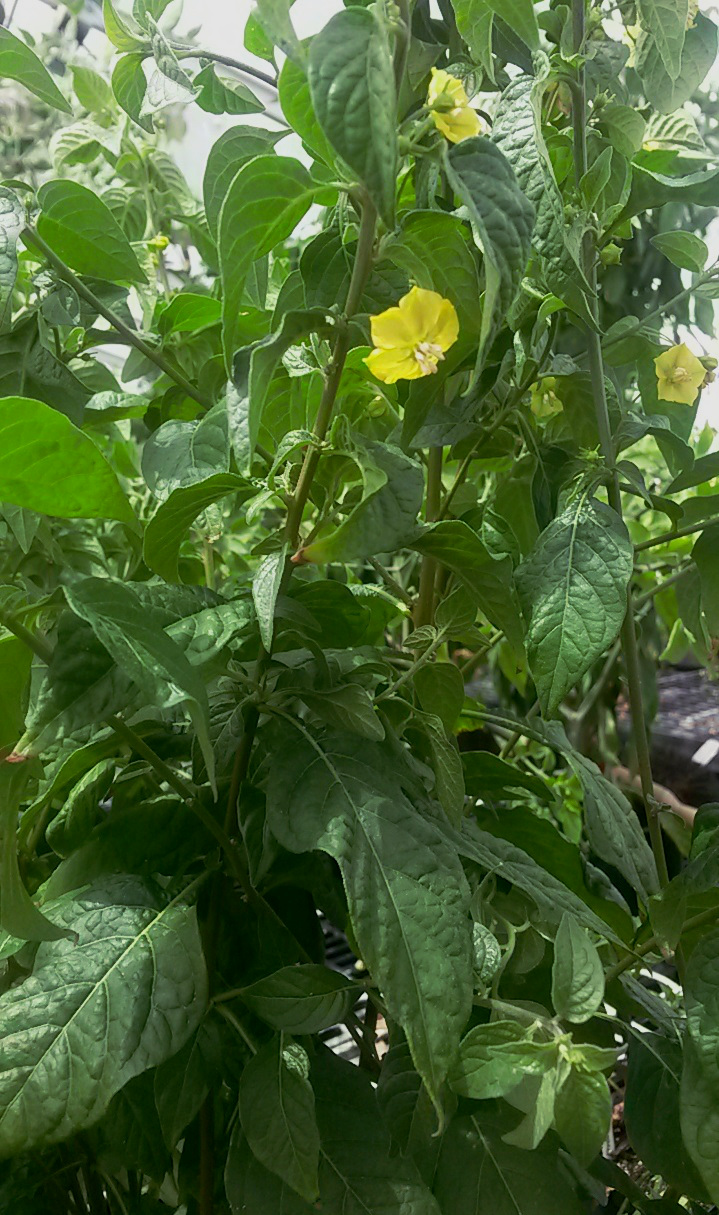
- Capsicum rhomboideum at flowering featuring yellow flowers.

Scientific classification
- Kingdom: Plantae
- Clade: Tracheophytes
- Clade: Angiosperms
- Clade: Eudicots
- Clade: Asterids
- Order: Solanales
- Family: Solanaceae
- Genus: Capsicum
- Species: C. rhomboideum

Binomial name
- Capsicum rhomboideum (Dunal) Kuntze

Synonyms
- Capsicum ciliatum (Kunth) Kuntze; Witheringia ciliata Kunth

= Capsicum rhomboideum =

Species of flowering plant

Capsicum rhomboideum is a perennial member of the genus Capsicum with 2n=2x=26, and is considered a distant wild relative of the chili pepper. Its fruit do not have any pungency, and are a 0 on the Scoville Heat Unit scale. It gets its name from the rhomboidal to elliptical shape of its leaves. It is native to Mexico, Central America, and Andean region of South America.

== Plant description ==
Capsicum rhomboideum is typically a perennial shrub. It is densely covered in trichomes, making it pubescent. It is best identified by its rhomboidal to elliptically-shaped leaves. The flowers have a five-toothed calyx and yellow bell-shaped corolla. The pollen grains are extremely small, 15 μm. Mature fruit of C. rhomboideum are pea-shaped and sized, bright red to black when fresh, and they darken as they dry. They typically bear 2-6 seed per fruit. The seeds are brown.

== Genome ==
The genome of C. rhomboideum is smaller than that of C. annuum. In the specific differentiation, C. rhomboideum likely underwent genome size reduction. Approximately 5% of the genome is heterochromatic. The typical Capsicum has 2n=24, and since 2n=26 in C. rhomboideum , causing it to be reclassified from Capsicum ciliatum in 2001.
