= Capsicum benoistii =

Scientific classification
- Kingdom: Plantae
- Clade: Tracheophytes
- Clade: Angiosperms
- Clade: Eudicots
- Clade: Asterids
- Order: Solanales
- Family: Solanaceae
- Genus: Capsicum
- Species: C. benoistii

Binomial name
- Capsicum benoistii Hunz. ex Barboza

Species of wild chili pepper

Capsicum benoistii is a species of wild chili pepper in the nightshade family Solanaceae, native to Ecuador. It was described by Gloria E. Barboza in 2019, and is one of the wild species of Capsicum treated in the 2022 monograph of the genus by Barboza and colleagues.

== Description ==
An erect shrub with few branches; the young stems are three-angled and light brown. The leaves are membranous and borne in markedly unequal pairs, ovate to elliptic, the larger blades 8.5–12 cm long. Flowers are borne three to six per leaf axil on slender, pendent stalks 13–20 mm long, and are five-parted.

== Distribution and habitat ==
It is native to central and southern Ecuador, where it grows in a wet tropical climate.
