= Johanna A. Witasek =

Austrian botanist (1865–1910)

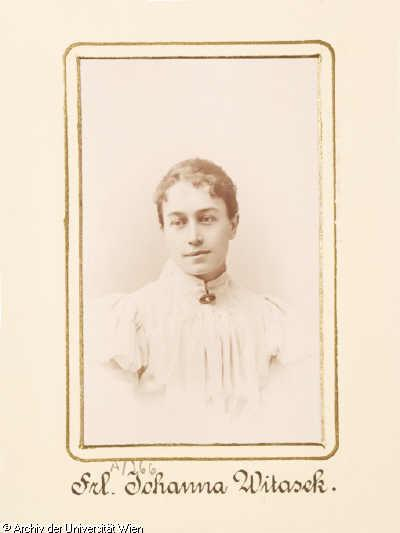
- Born: August 13, 1865
- Died: July 5, 1910 (aged 44)
- Occupation: Botanist
- Known for: plant taxonomy
- Scientific career
- Author abbrev. (botany): Witasek

Johanna Amalia Witasek (13 August 1865 – 5 July 1910) was an Austrian botanist noted for her work on taxonomy, geographic distribution, and nomenclature. Witasek studied at the Botanical Museum in Vienna, working on material brought back from expeditions to Brazil and Samoa. Over eleven years, she published a number of papers on Solanaceae, Campanula, and Callianthemum.

== Life ==
Witasek was born on 13 August 1865 in Vienna. Her father was a railway engineer. She initially worked as a school teacher in public schools in Vienna, and later in a school for girls. In 1899, she began studying at the botanical museum in Vienna. She published papers over eleven years, on the taxonomy, geographic distribution, and nomenclature of plants. She published a monograph in 1908 on Solanaceae in Brazil, using material from the Austrian Academy of Science expedition in 1901, led by Richard Wettstein. Witasek also published on the distribution of Campanula, and researched the genus Callianthemum.

Her last major work, a monograph on nightshade (Solanum) plants, was published in 1909. This material came from the Samoa trip of Karl Rechinger and Lily Rechinger-Favarger. Rechinger's work of Botanical and Zoological Results, submitted to the Academy of Sciences in July 1909, was reprinted in 1910, including Witasek's contributions. The work was published in the same year.

Witasek died on 5 July 1910 in Vienna, aged forty-four years, by suicide. Her botanical collection was donated to the Botanical Museum after her death.

== Written works ==
- Witasek, Johanna (1902). Ein Beitrag zur Kenntnis der Gattung Campanula (in German).
