= Otto Sendtner =

German botanist (1813-1859)

Otto Sendtner (27 June 1813 – 21 April 1859) was a German botanist and phytogeographer born in Munich.

He received his education at the Ludwig-Maximilians-Universität München, where he was a student of Karl Friedrich Schimper (1803–1867). Afterwards, he served as a private secretary to a Silesian nobleman, and during his spare time performed studies of cryptogramic flora of the Sudetenland.

In 1841, he was appointed curator of the Leuchtenbergsche Naturalienkabinett in Eichstätt. Two years later he accompanied Mutius von Tommasini (1794–1879) on a botanical excursion through Istria and Tyrol, and in 1847 conducted botanical research in Bosnia. During this time period he also performed phytogeographical studies in southern Bavaria. In 1854, he became an associate professor, and in 1857 was appointed to the second chair of botany, as well as first curator of the herbarium at the Ludwig-Maximilians-Universität München.

Sendtner was a pioneer in the field of phytogeography, and in his research conducted important analyses involving the vertical distribution patterns of different types of vegetation. The genus Sendtnera Endl. (1840) is probably named after him, although no etymology is given. Also the specific epithet of Halacsya sendtneri (Boiss.) Dörfl. was also named in his honour. As a taxonomist he described many plants within the family Solanaceae.

In 1993, the Ludwig-Maximilians-Universität München started producing Sendtnera, an annually published botanical magazine of the university botany department. It was named after Otto Sendtner. Until Volume 8 in 2002.

== Selected publications ==
- Die Vegetationsverhältnisse Südbayerns nach den Grundsätzen der Pflanzengeographie und mit Bezugnahme auf die Landeskultur (Vegetation conditions of southern Bavaria in accordance with principles of plant geography and with reference to the local culture), 1854
- Die Vegetationsverhältnisse des Bayerischen Waldes nach den Grundsätzen der Pflanzengeographie (Vegetation conditions of the Bavarian Forest in accordance with the principles of plant geography), 1860

== See also ==
- Category:Taxa named by Otto Sendtner
