= Capsicum conicum =

Capsicum conicum may refer to:

- A synonym of Capsicum annuum
- A synonym of Capsicum baccatum
