= Pickled fruit =

Fruit preserved in brine or vinegar

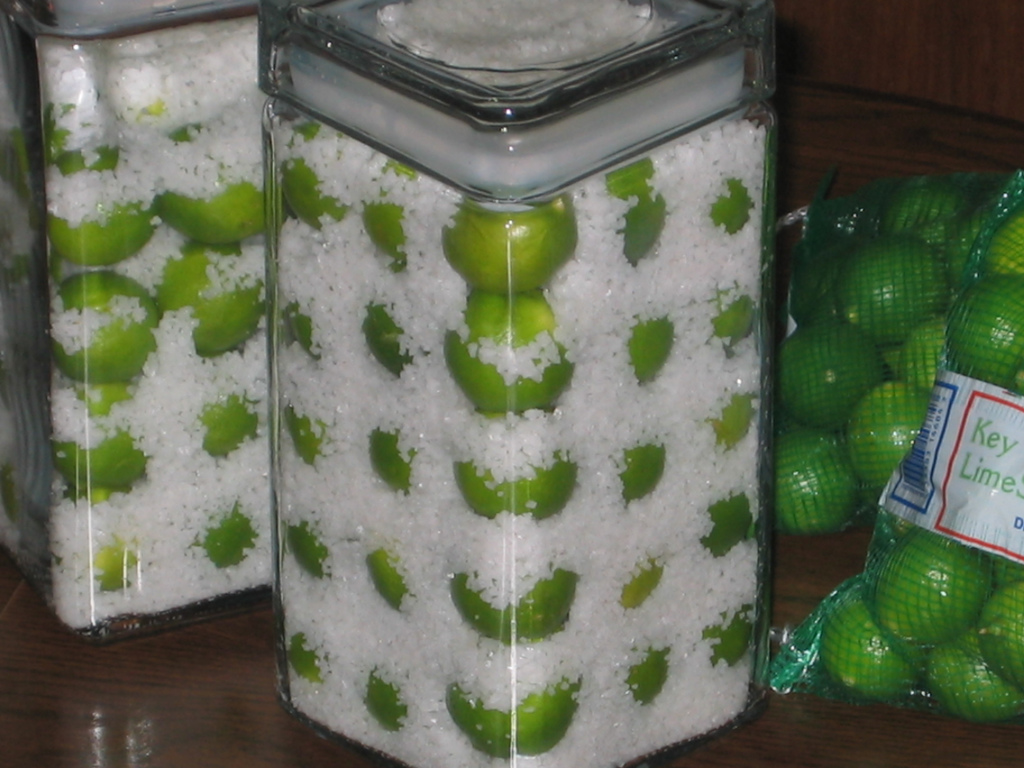
Chanh muối, a type of pickled lime, aging in glass containers

Pickled fruit is fruit that has been pickled. Pickling is the process of food preservation by either anaerobic fermentation in brine or immersion in vinegar. Many types of fruit are pickled. Some examples include peaches, apples, crabapples, pears, plums, grapes, currants, tomatoes and olives. Vinegar may also be prepared from fruit, such as apple cider vinegar.

For thousands of years in many parts of the world, pickles have been used as the main method to preserve fruits and other foods. There is evidence that thousands of years ago in Mesopotamia, Egypt, Greece, Rome and China people pickled different foods for preservation. Mayan culture in America used tobacco to preserve food, specifically to make pickled peppers. In ancient times the different cultures used salt that was found naturally and water to make the brine, which they used to pickle foods that cannot be eaten naturally, such as olives and some grains.

== Peaches ==
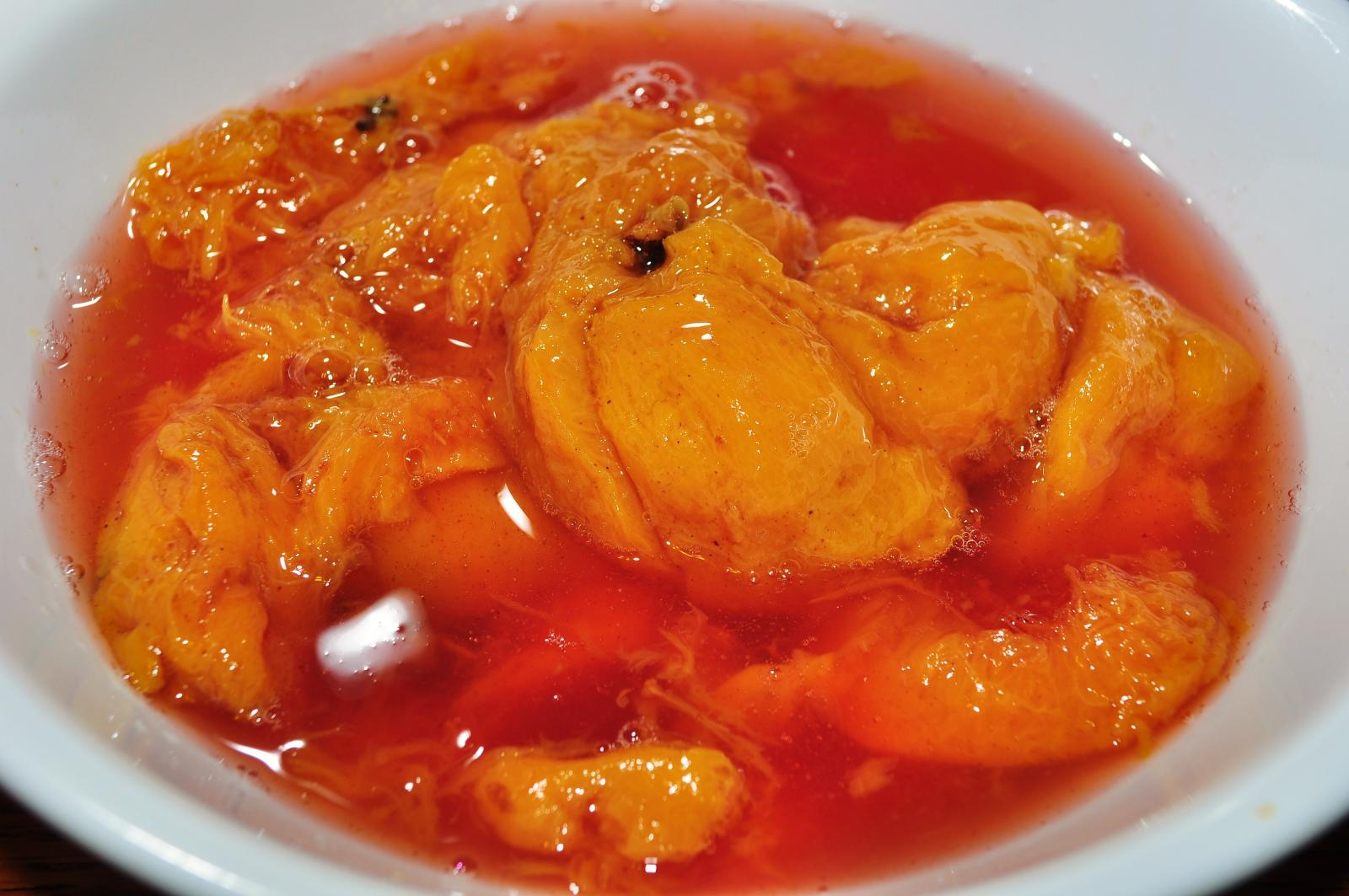
Pickled peaches

Pickled peaches may be prepared from medium-sized, non-melting clingstone peaches that are small-seeded. In the United States prior to around 1960, some were prepared from small, unripe freestone peaches. Flavour may be added to the pickle using 'sweet spices', such as cinnamon, cloves and allspice, or savoury pickling spices, such as peppercorns and coriander. Pickled peaches may be used to accompany meats and in salads, and also have other uses.

== Pears ==
Pickled pears may be prepared with sugar, cinnamon, cloves and allspice to add flavor, and may be referred to as spiced pears. They may be prepared from underripe pears. Pickled pears may be used to accompany dishes such as roasts and salads, among others.

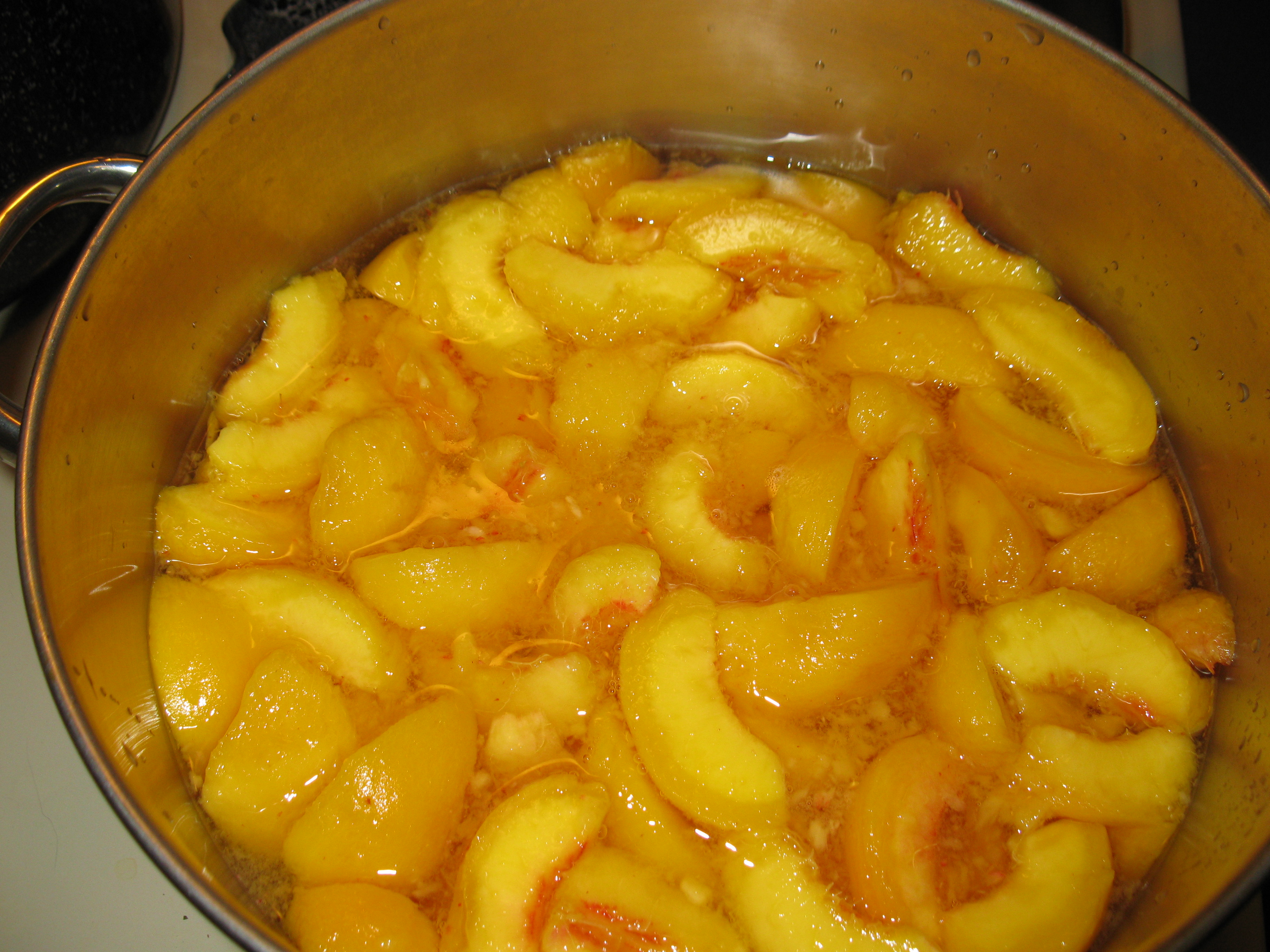
Pickled peaches

== Grapes ==
Grapes are often pickled with white wine vinegar, water, kosher salt, sugar, cloves, and rosemary. Garlic, chili flakes, and other spices can also provide an unconventional flavor.

== Cantaloupe ==
The cantaloupe is a summer season fruit, which can be pickled and refrigerated to be able to eat it during the rest of the year. The cantaloupe can be pickled using champagne vinegar, hot water, granulated sugar, ice, mustard seed, celery seed, Aleppo pepper and cinnamon stick.

== List of pickled fruits ==
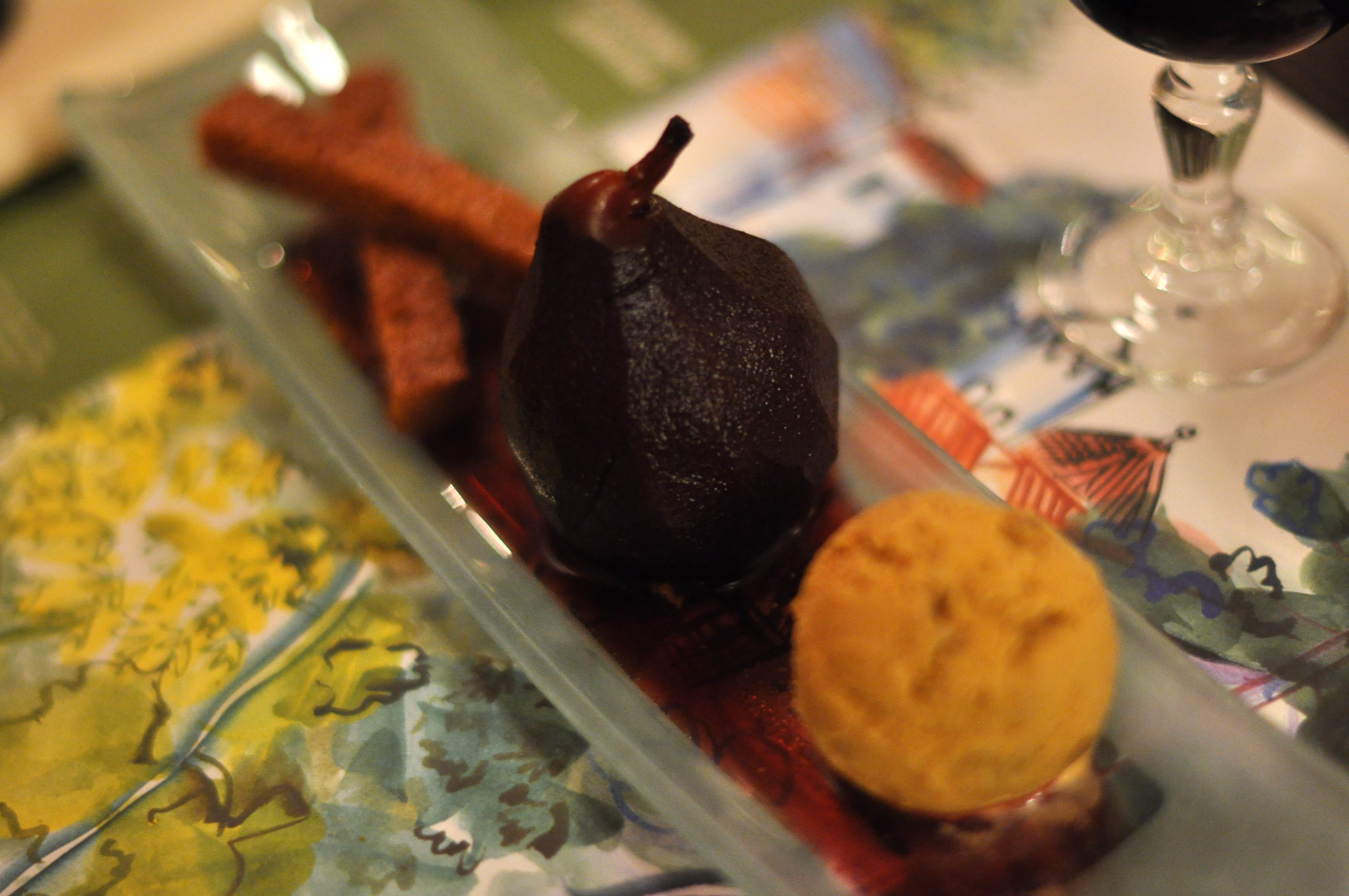
A pickled pear (center of plate)

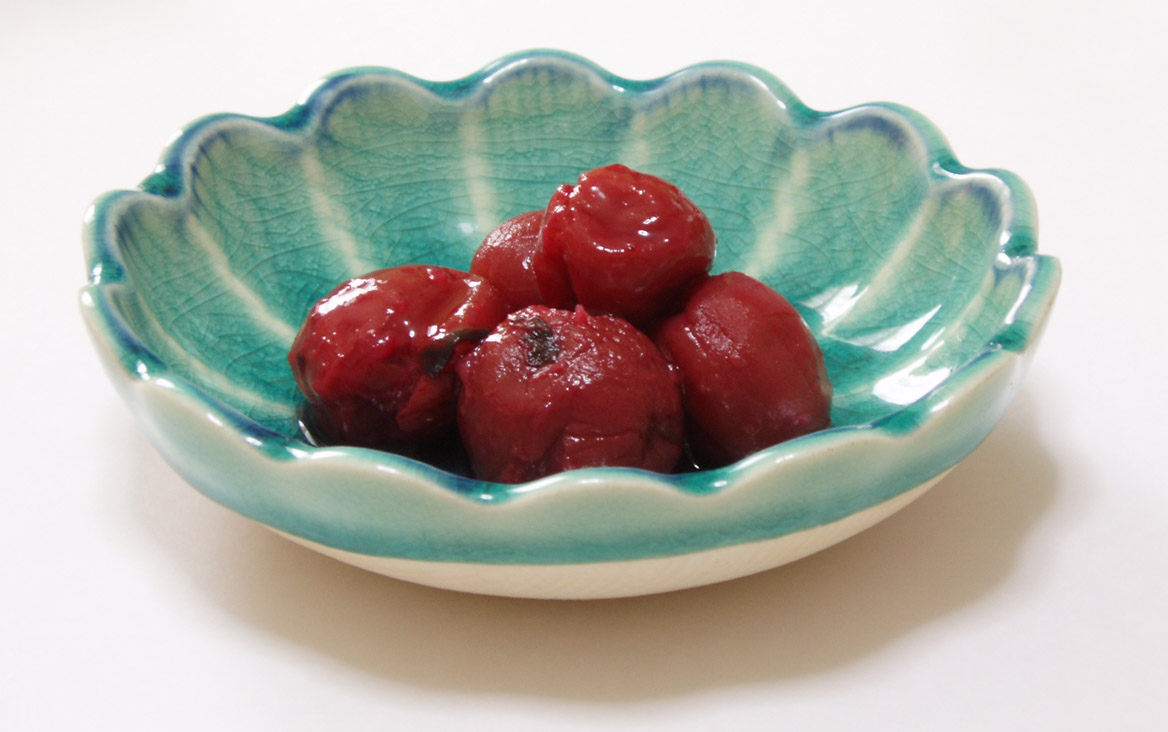
Umeboshi

- Apple
  - Crab apple
- Apricot
  - Umeboshi
- Barberry
- Blackberry
- Blueberry
- Caper
- Cherry
- Citrus peel
- Currant
- Dates
- Damson
- Fig
- Grape
- Mango pickle
  - Aavakaaya
- Nata de coco – fermented coconut juice
- Nata de pina – fermented pineapple juice
- Olives
- Orange
- Peach
  - Nectarine
- Pear
- Peppadew
- Pickled lime
- Pickled pepper
- Plum
- Preserved lemon
- Prunes
- Strawberry
- Tomato
- Watermelon may be pickled, as well as watermelon rind.
Pickled fruits

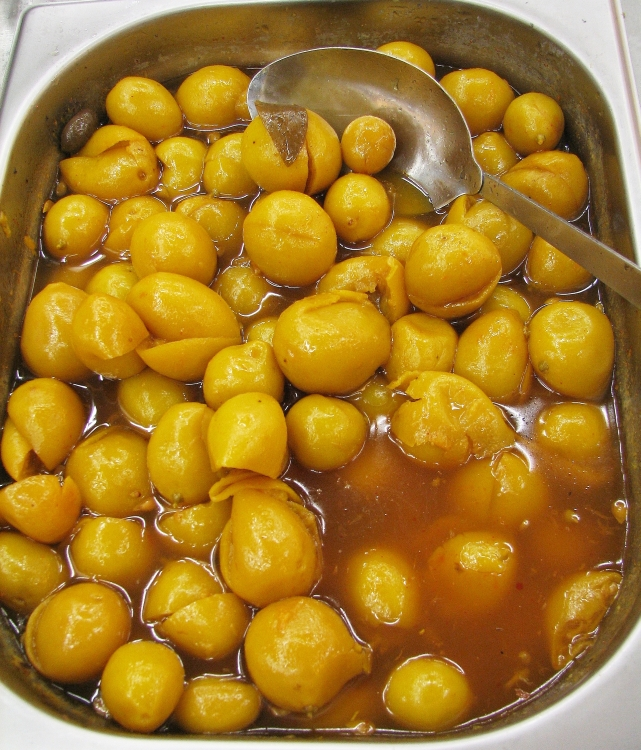
Pickled lemons

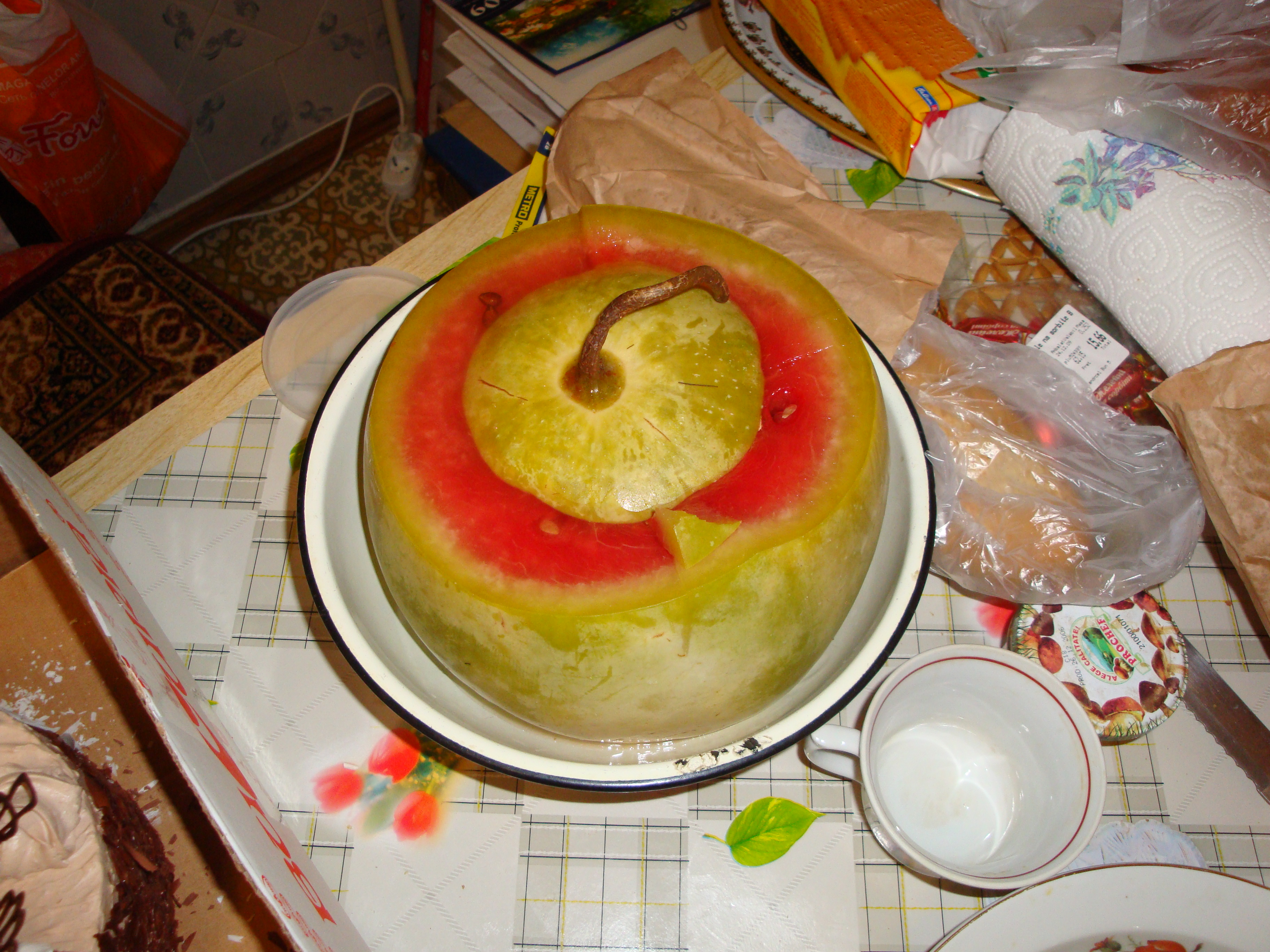
Pickled watermelon.

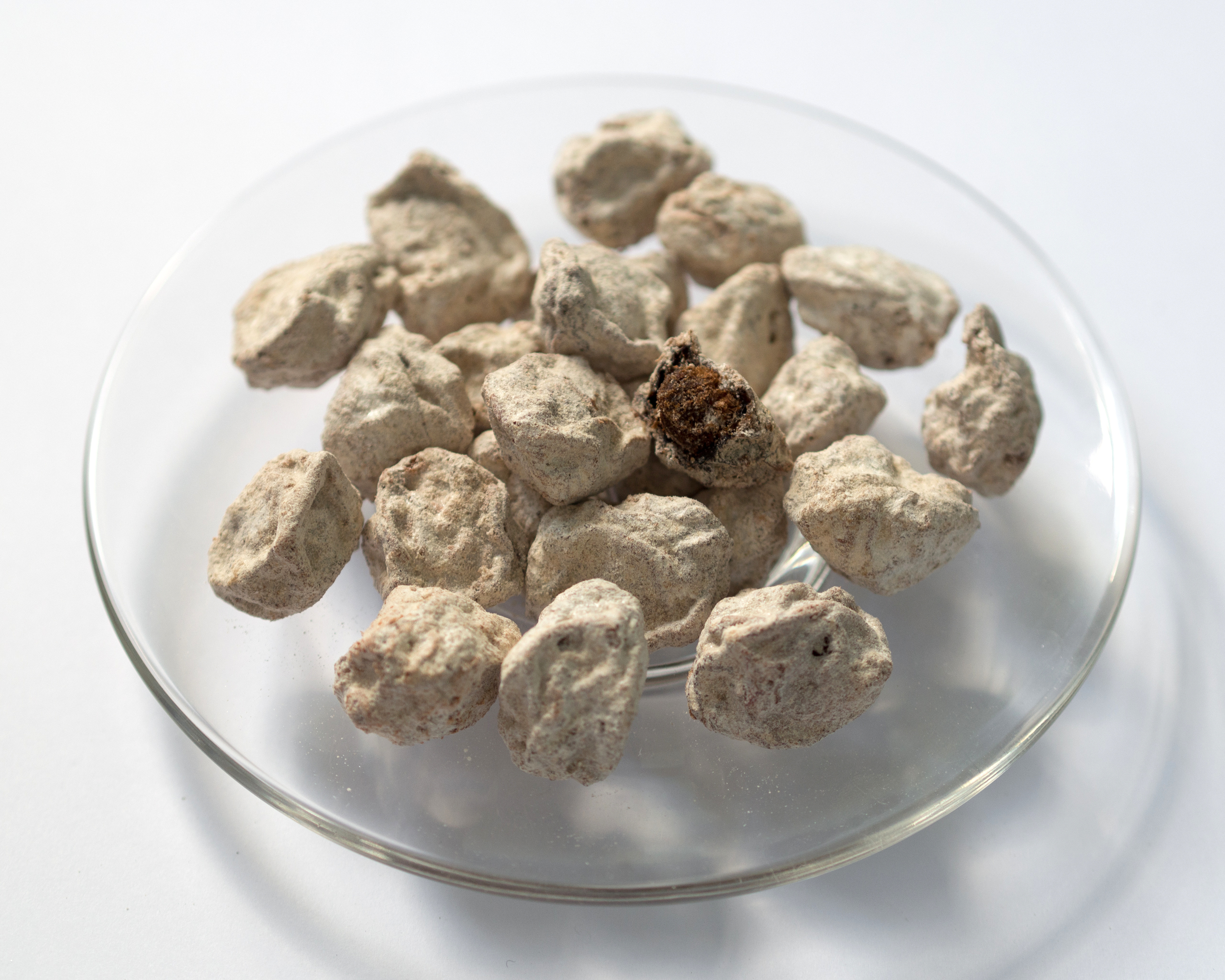
Buai khem is Thai for "salted (Chinese) plums". They are prepared from Prunus mume (also known as "Chinese Plum" or "Japanese Apricot"), and are pickled, dried, and salted.

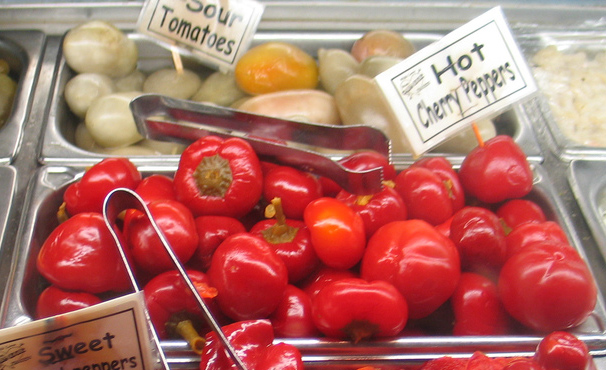
Pickled pimientos

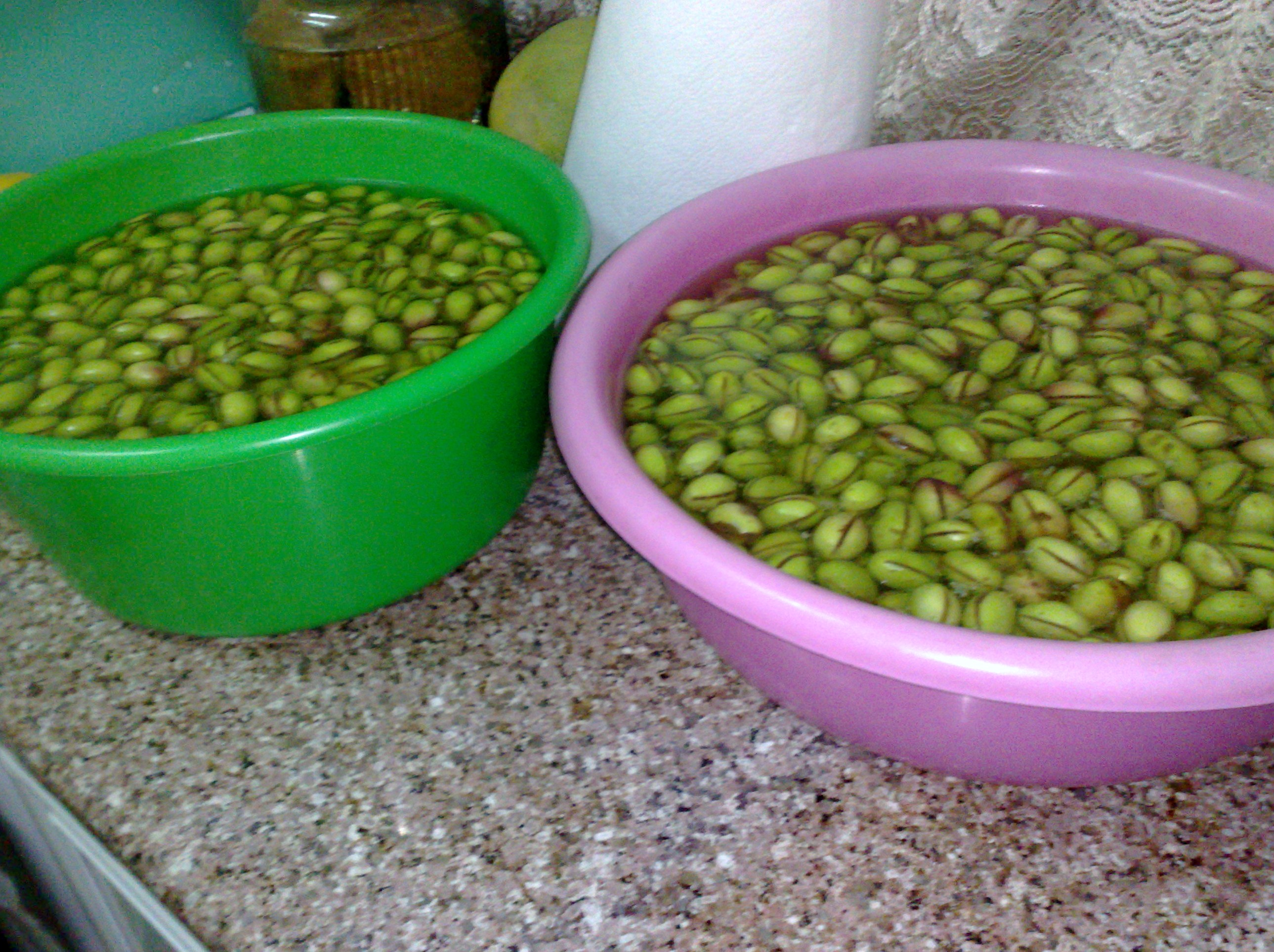
Olives being pickled

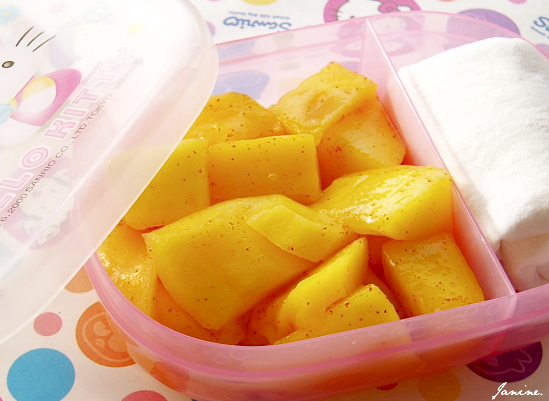
Pickled mango

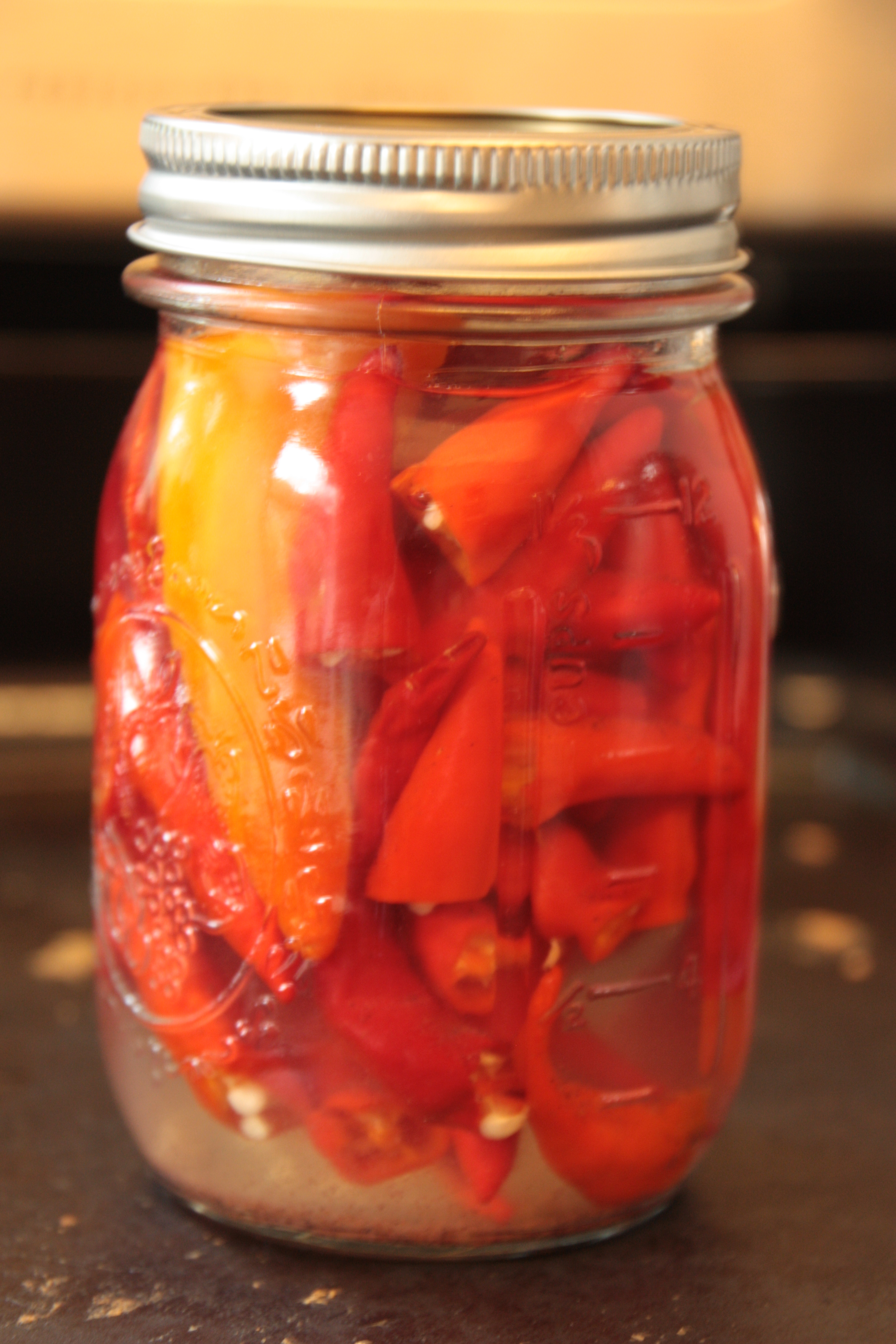
Jarred pickled peppers

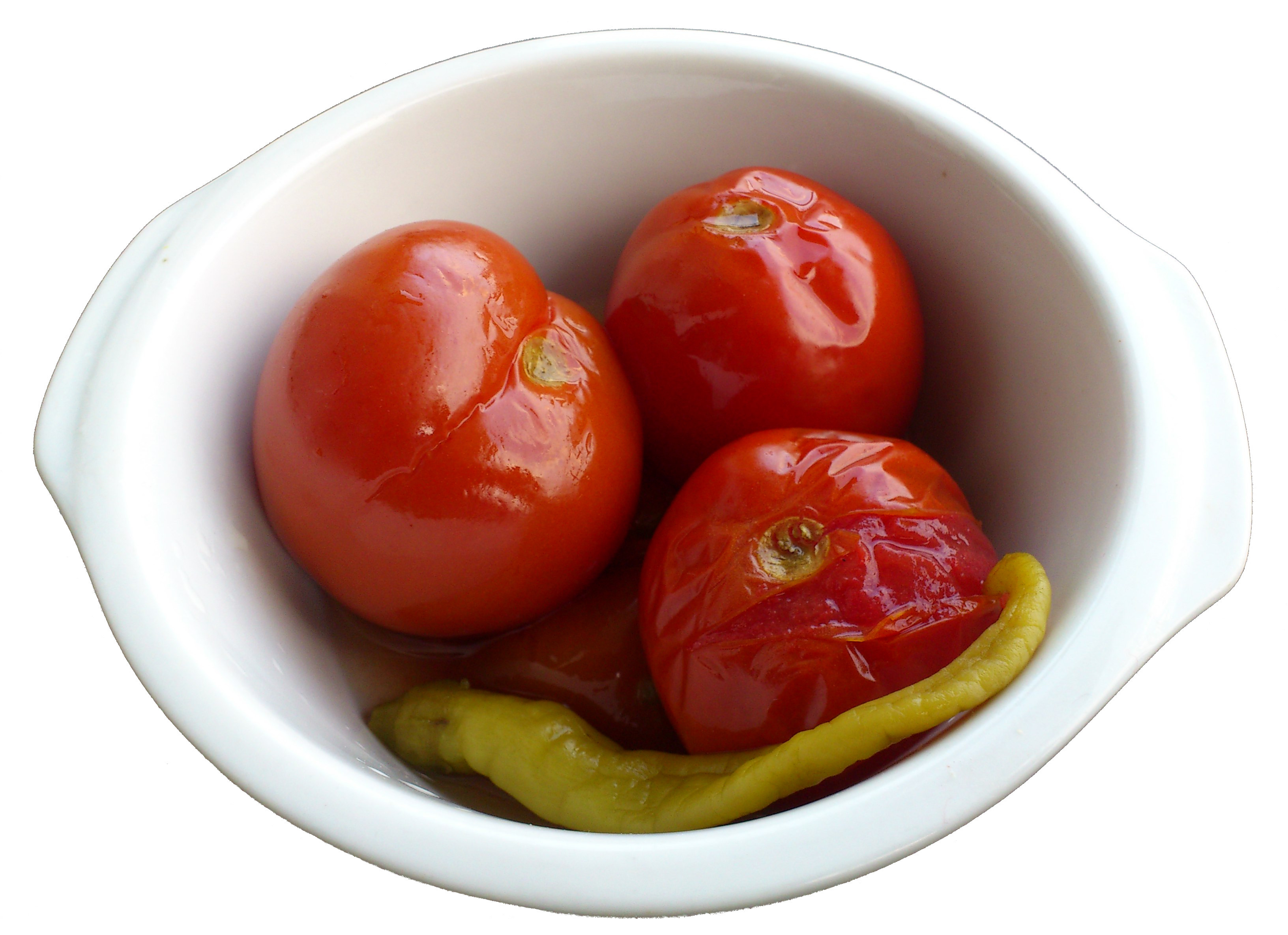
Pickled tomatoes

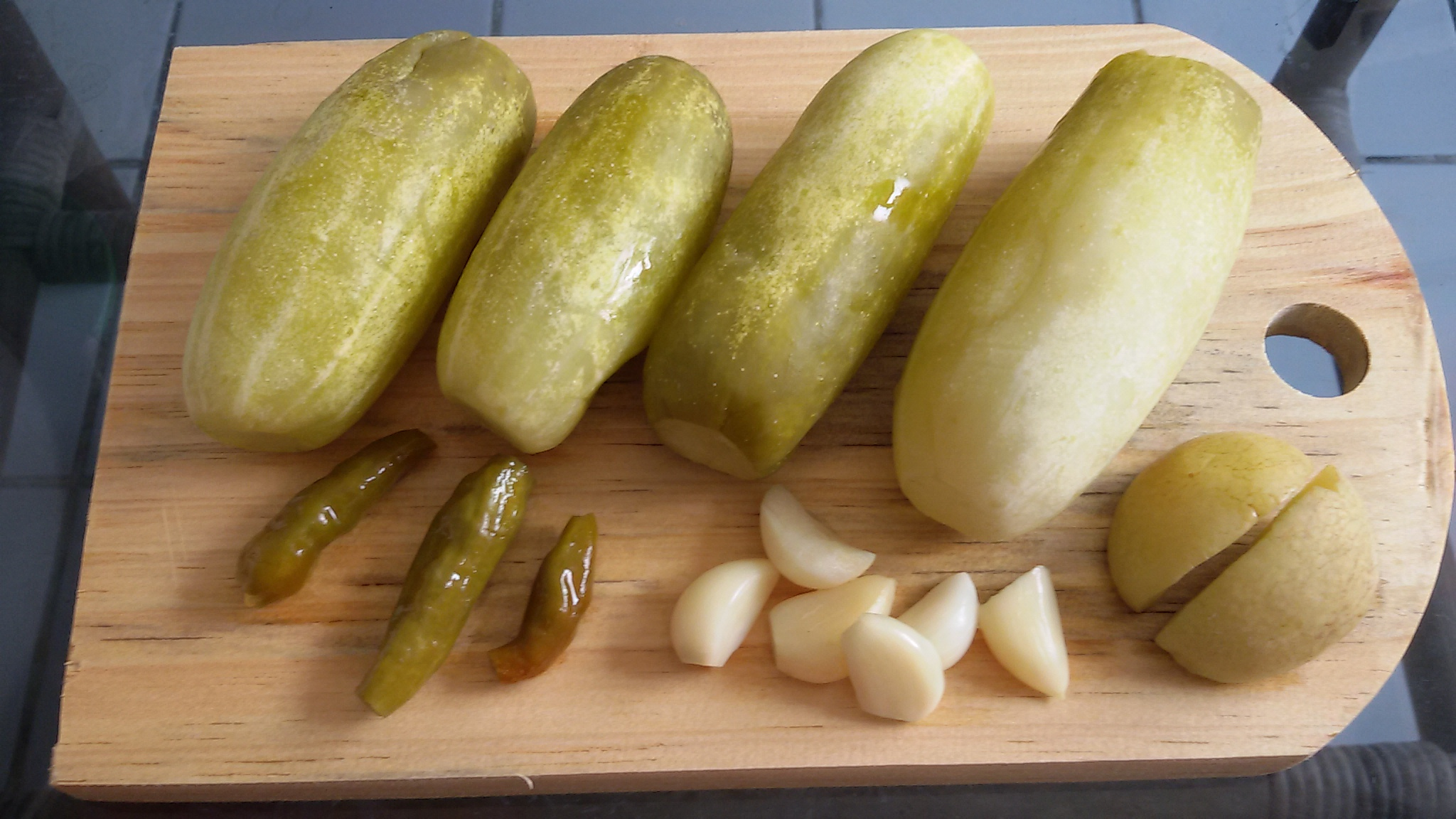
Pickled apple along with other vegetables.

== By country ==
In Malaysia, some fruits are pickled when they are unripe, such as belimbing, kedondong, chermai, lime, pineapple, papaya, mango and nutmeg.

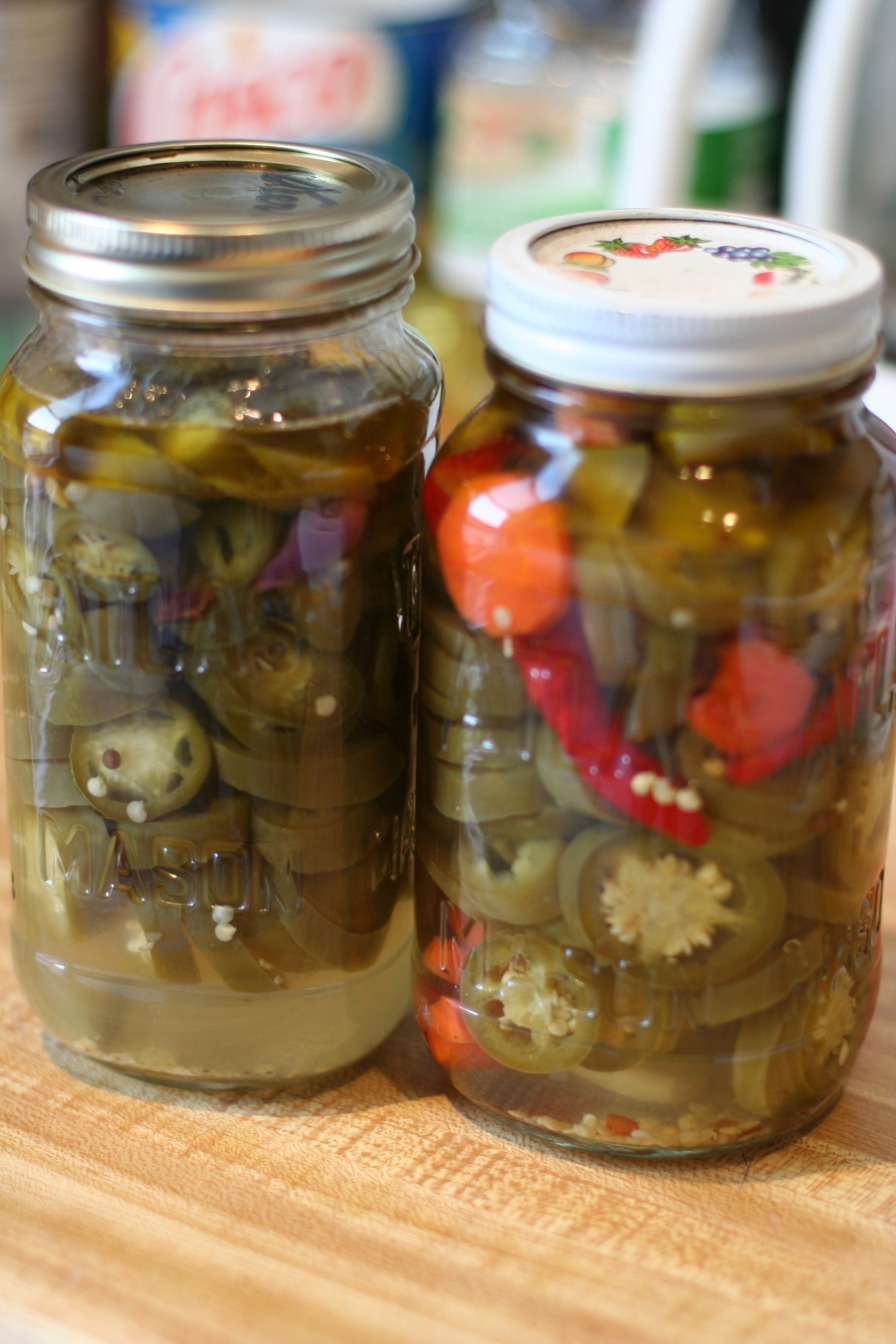

In Mexico, there are two phrases to describe a pickle: the term "escabechar" or "encurtir" is used when food is pickled in vinegar; whereas it is called "escabeche" or "salmuera" when salt is the main pickling agent.

The word "vinegar" is of French origin, vin aigre meaning literally "sour wine", cognate to Spanish vino-agrio. At its origin, vinegar was obtained by fermentation of wine which was sour.

In Mexico, vinegar is obtained in large part from the fermentation of fruits such as pineapple and apple; people use this naturally sourced vinegar to pickle fruits and vegetables in the home. With many various peppers, the pickle pepper is very popular in Mexico — the pepper being one of the main products made both at home and by the pickling industry. Some states in Mexico such as Oaxaca and Puebla use homemade fermented pineapple-vinegar or sour brine to pickle fruits such as mangoes, membrillos and some cactus — the resulting pickles are then used as ingredients in traditional cooking.

== See also ==
- Chutney – South Asian condiment
- List of condiments
- List of fruit dishes
- List of Indian pickles
- List of pickled foods
- Peter Piper – Nursery rhyme
- Pickles in India and Pakistan – Pickled varieties of vegetable and fruit
