= Preserved lemon =

Type of pickle

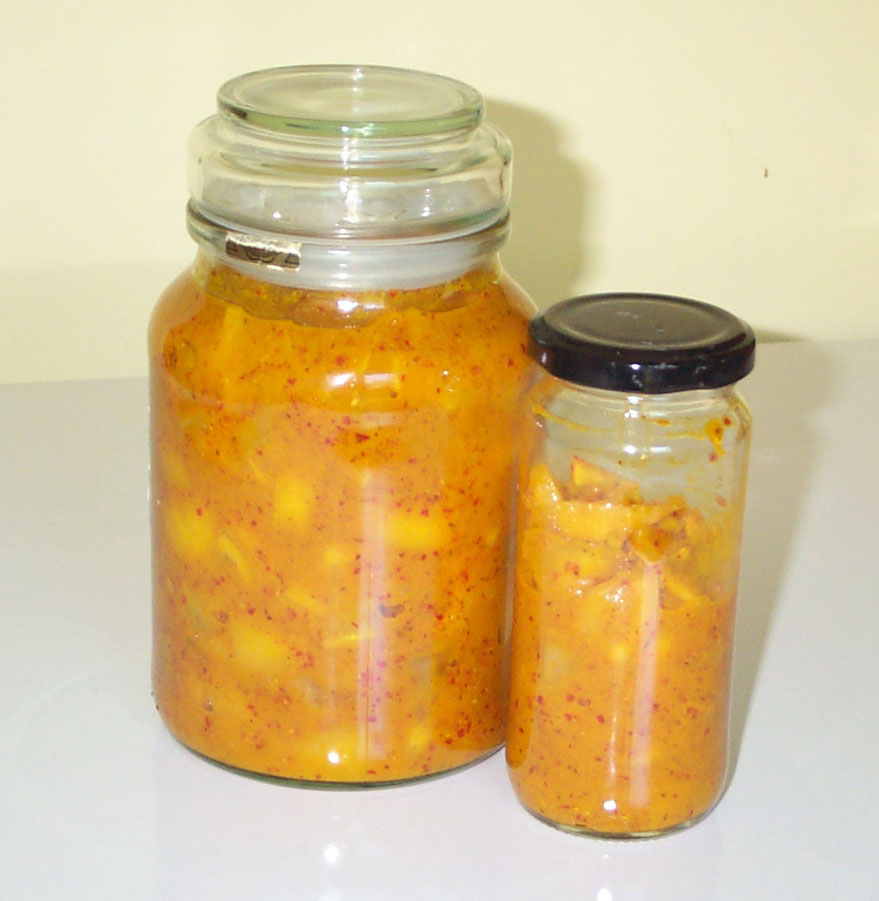
Lemon pickle

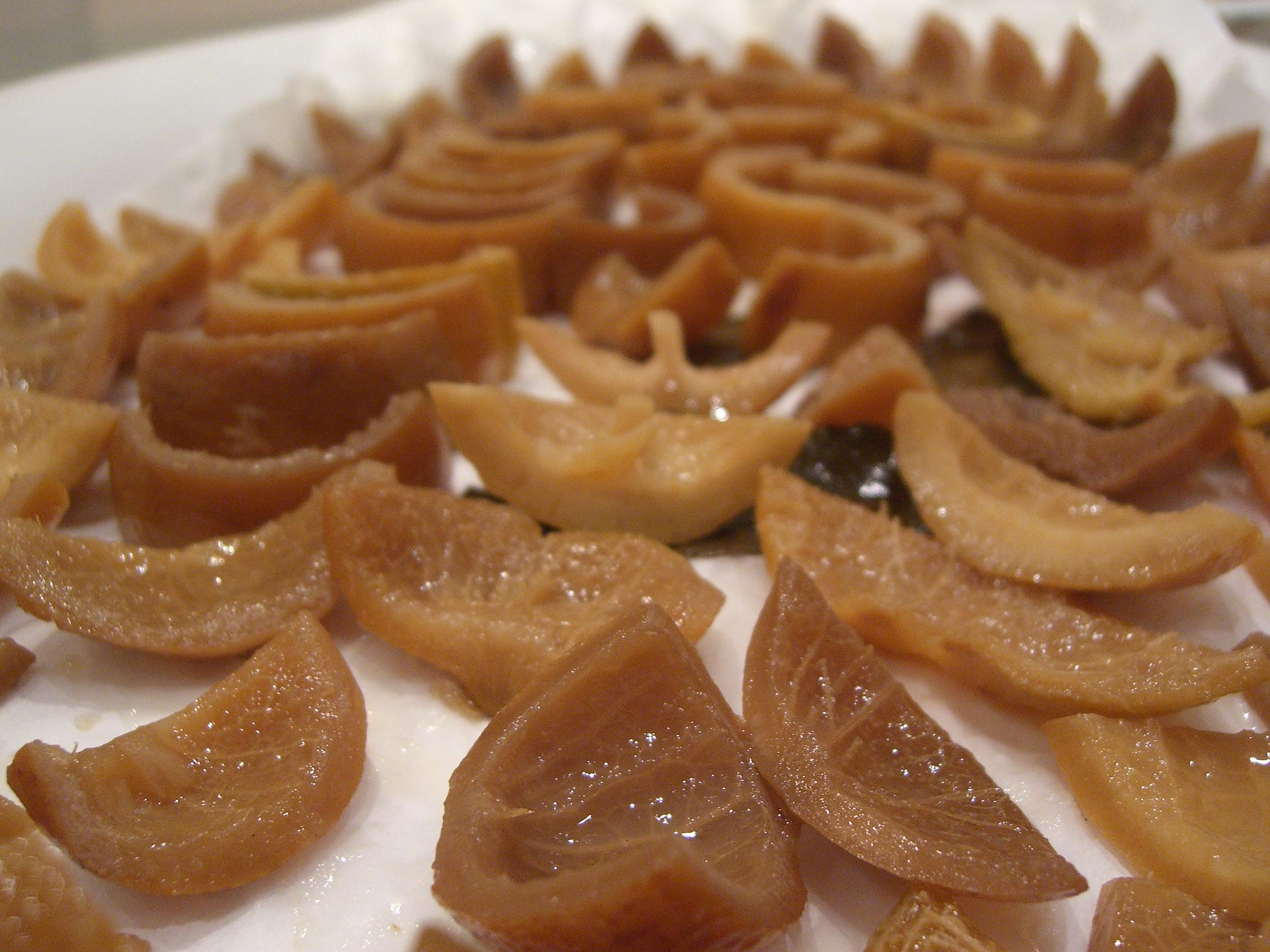
Preserved lemons drying

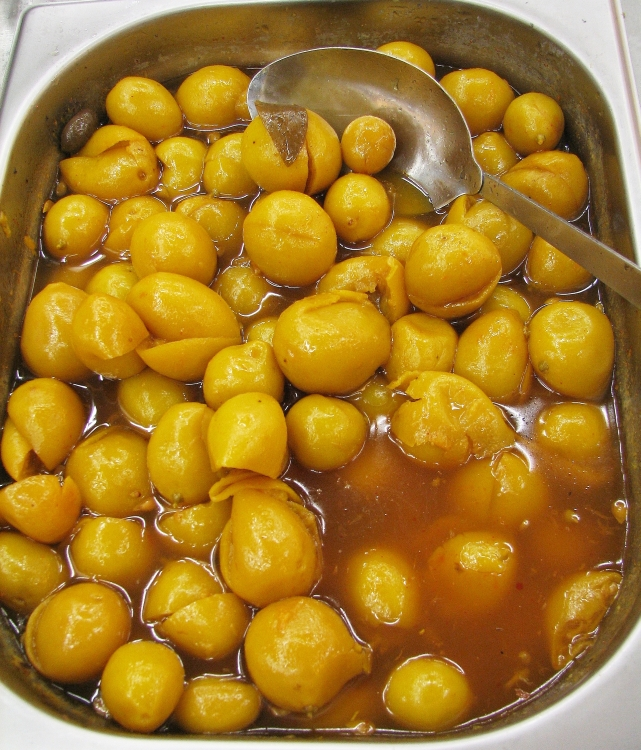
Pickled lemons made from Citrus limetta are a Moroccan delicacy

Preserved lemon or lemon pickle is a condiment that is common in the cuisines of the Indian subcontinent and Morocco. It was also found in 18th-century English cuisine.

It is also known as "country lemon". Diced, quartered, halved, or whole lemons are pickled in a brine of water, lemon juice, and salt; occasionally spices are included as well. The pickle is allowed to ferment at room temperature for weeks or months before it is used. The pulp of the preserved lemon can be used in stews and sauces, but it is the peel (zest and pith together) that is most valued. The flavor is mildly tart but intensely lemony.

== Usage ==
Pieces of pickled lemon may be washed before using to remove any surface salt, or blanched to remove more of the salt and bring out the natural mild sweetness. They may then be sliced, chopped, or minced as needed for the texture of the dish. The rind may be used with or without the pulp.

Preserved lemon is the key ingredient in many Moroccan dishes, such as tagines. In Cambodian cuisine, it is used in dishes such as ngam nguv, a chicken soup with whole preserved lemons. They are often combined in various ways with olives, artichokes, seafood, veal, chicken, and rice.

The pickled pulp and liquid can be used in Bloody Marys and other beverages where lemon and salt are used. The flavor also combines well with horseradish, as in American-style cocktail sauce.

In Ayurvedic cuisine, lemon pickle is a home remedy for stomach disorders, and its value is said to increase as it matures. In East African folk medicine, lemon pickle is given for excessive growth of the spleen.

== Variations ==
Lime and grapefruit also are pickled in this manner.

== History ==
Historically, pickling was an affordable and practical method of preserving lemons for use long after their season and far away from where they are grown. Early 19th-century English, American, and (in translation) Indian cookbooks give recipes for lemon pickle and mention its use in sauces for salmon, veal, etc.; dishes where today fresh lemon zest and/or juice would be used.

An early 19th-century recipe is as follows, taken from A New System of Domestic Cookery:

They should be small, and with thick rinds: rub them with a piece of flannel; then slit them half down in four quarters, but not through to the pulp; fill the slits with salt hard pressed in, set them upright in a pan for four or five days, until the salt melts; turn them thrice a day in their own liquor, until tender; make enough pickle to cover them, of rape-vinegar, the brine of the lemons, Jamaica pepper, and ginger; boil and skim it; when cold, put it to the lemons, with two ounces of mustard-seed, and two cloves of garlic to six lemons. When the lemons are used, the pickle will be useful in fish or other sauces.

— A Lady

A similar recipe appears in Mary Randolph's 1824 cookbook. Similar recipes also appear in earlier cookbooks, such as the 18th-century cookbook by English housekeeper Elizabeth Raffald. Some recipes include grating or thinly peeling the lemons, and preserving the peels (zest) which were dried for later use.

== Nutritional value ==
In contrast to the unpeeled lemon, the amount of vitamins within the preserved lemons is reduced, along with a loss of minerals and simple carbohydrates such as sugar and starch.

Preserved Lemon
Nutritional value per 100 g (3.5 oz)
- Energy: 100 kJ (24 kcal)
- Carbohydrates: 13.33 g
- Starch: 0 g
- Dietary fiber: 6.7 g
- Fat: 6.67 g
- Saturated: 1.330 g
- Protein: 0 g
Vitamins and minerals
Vitamins	Quantity %DV^{†}
Vitamin A	0 IU
Vitamin C	0% 0 mg
Minerals	Quantity %DV^{†}
Calcium	0% 0 mg
Iron	0% 0 mg
Sodium	3% 72 mg
- Link to USDA Database entry
- ^{†}Percentages estimated using US recommendations for adults.

== Physical and chemical changes ==
Lemon, raw, without peel
Nutritional value per 100 g (3.5 oz)
- Energy: 121 kJ (29 kcal)
- Carbohydrates: 9.32 g
- Sugars: 2.5 g
- Dietary fiber: 2.8 g
- Fat: 0.3 g
- Protein: 1.1 g
Vitamins and minerals
Vitamins	Quantity %DV^{†}
Thiamine (B1)	3% 0.04 mg
Riboflavin (B2)	2% 0.02 mg
Niacin (B3)	1% 0.1 mg
Pantothenic acid (B5)	4% 0.19 mg
Vitamin B6	5% 0.08 mg
Folate (B9)	3% 11 μg
Choline	1% 5.1 mg
Vitamin C	59% 53 mg
Minerals	Quantity %DV^{†}
Calcium	2% 26 mg
Iron	3% 0.6 mg
Magnesium	2% 8 mg
Manganese	1% 0.03 mg
Phosphorus	1% 16 mg
Potassium	5% 138 mg
Zinc	1% 0.06 mg
- Link to USDA Database entry
- ^{†}Percentages estimated using US recommendations for adults, except for potassium, which is estimated based on expert recommendation from the National Academies.

The process of fermentation is a complex one and causes a multitude of changes at the exterior and interior levels of the lemon. All of the known exterior changes are observable with the human eye. These changes include a wrinkling of the skin along with a slight browning of the interior portion of the lemon (if sliced), due to oxidation.

Although there is not much research on the chemical reactions that take place within lemons during the preservation process of fermentation, using research based on other fruits and through observation, conclusions can be made with supporting evidence. With the definition above, it can be concluded that the sugar and starch within the lemons are chemically broken down during the fermentation process. Based on the nutritional value, it can also be theorized that protein is broken down or hydrolyzed during the fermentation process as there is an absence of the macronutrient post-fermentation.

There are also a number of factors that can influence the success rate and level of safety in regard to fermentation. Fermentation can be heavily affected by compositional factors within the fruit such as pH, buffer capacity and initial sugar content. All of these factors can be altered depending on the size of the fruit as the larger the fruit, the more nutritional value the fruit will hold. Additionally, pesticides can have an effect on fermentation. If pesticides are left in large quantities on the fruits' surface during fermentation, the process of preservation increases the potency of the hazardous materials within the pesticides.

== Roles of minerals, macronutrients, acids, and antioxidants in fermentation ==
A common macronutrient used in curing is salt, which increases the osmolarity of the liquid to inhibit the growth of certain classes of microorganisms. This effect creates a difficult environment for those bacteria to survive in and allows the growth of salt-tolerant microbes. Salt also helps extend shelf life. The juice from the lemon is acidic and contains citric acid that helps lower the pH, which additionally restricts microbes that can cause spoilage and disease. For preservation of lemons, the use of antioxidants as a food additive is used to prevent lipid peroxidation and the fading of food color.

Although lemons contain citric acid, most citric acid is produced by fermentation using microbes that can convert sugars into citric acid, which is the most important organic acid produced in tonnage and is extensively used in food and pharmaceutical industries. It is produced mainly by submerged fermentation using Aspergillus niger or Candida spp. from different sources of carbohydrates, such as molasses and starch-based media. The food and beverage industries use this acid extensively as a food additive globally.

== See also ==
- Chanh muối
- Fruit preserves – Preparations of fruits, sugar, and sometimes acid
- List of lemon dishes and drinks
- Pickled fruit
- Pickled lime
- Zest (ingredient) – Scraped skin of citrus fruit
