= Lemon drop pepper =

Variety of chili pepper

Lemon drop chilli, ají limón
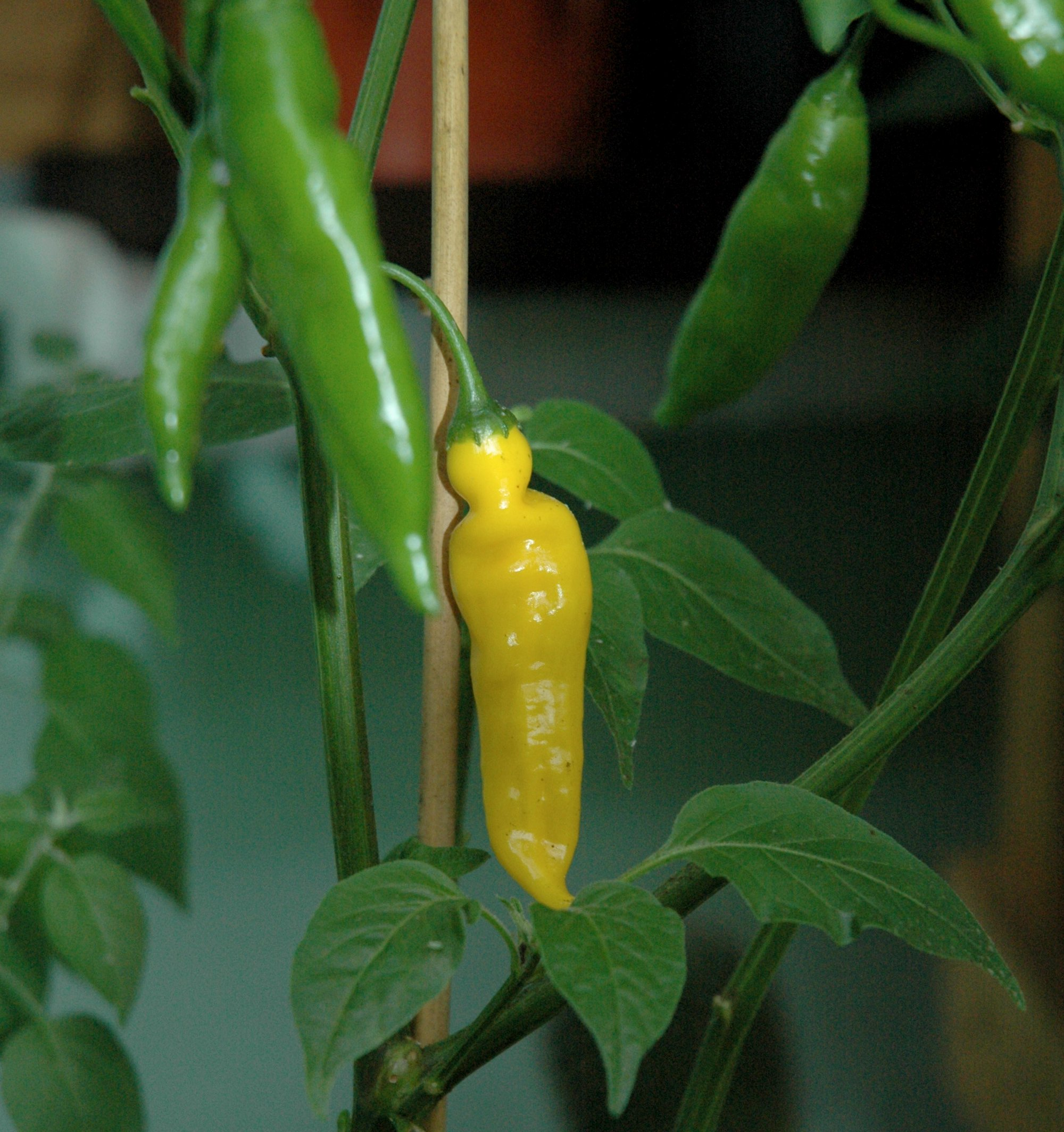
- Genus: Capsicum
- Species: Capsicum baccatum
- Cultivar: 'Lemon Drop'
- Heat: Hot
- Scoville scale: 30,000-50,000 SHU

The Lemon Drop pepper or the Ají Limón is a hot, citrus-like, lemon-flavored pepper which is a popular seasoning pepper in Peru, where it is known as qillu uchu. A member of the Capsicum baccatum species, the lemon drop is a cone pepper that is around 60–80 mm (2.4–3.1 in) long and 12 mm (0.47 in) wide with some crinkling. It is commonly mistaken for Ají Limo which belongs to Capsicum chinense, ripens to red, and has differently coloured flowers.

== Description ==
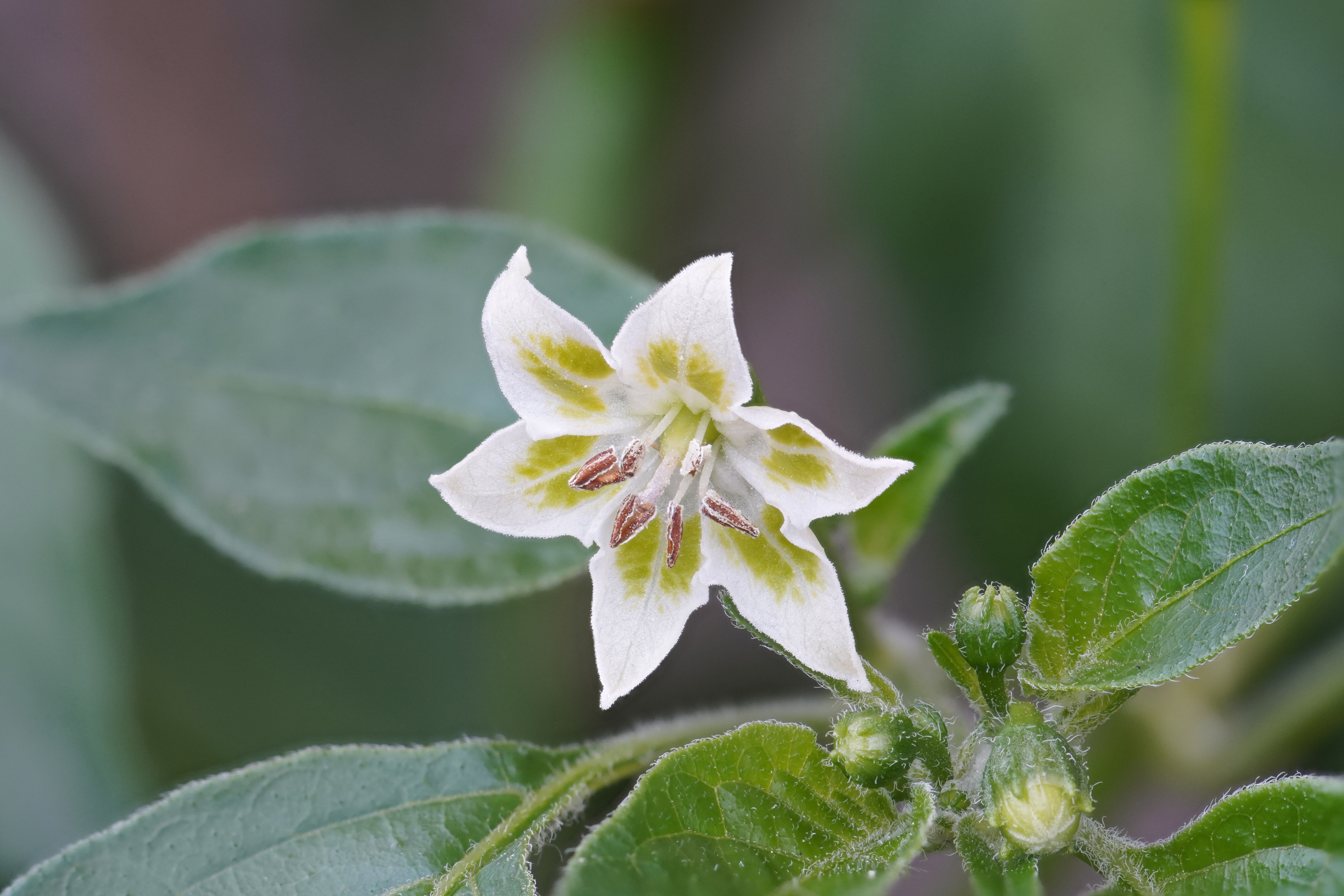
Blossom and buds

Plants of the lemon drop variety are typical representatives of the species Capsicum baccatum. In the first year they can reach a height of 1.5 to 2 m (4.9 to 6.6 ft). The plant grows upright and is highly branched. The leaves are dark green and relatively narrow, the petals are whitish - green and carry yellow - green spots on the base. Lemon drop is a high yielding chilli plant, in a year one plant can produce over 100 fruits. The time between fertilization of flowers and ripening of the fruit is about 80 days.

== Varieties ==
The lemon drop, which has been confused with the ají limo of a different species (C. chinense), has the following variants:

- Ají mochero: Characterized by its citrus scent and bright yellow color.
- Ají miscucho.
- Ají paringo.
- Ají bola.
