= Pickled lime =

Method of preserving the fruit of limes

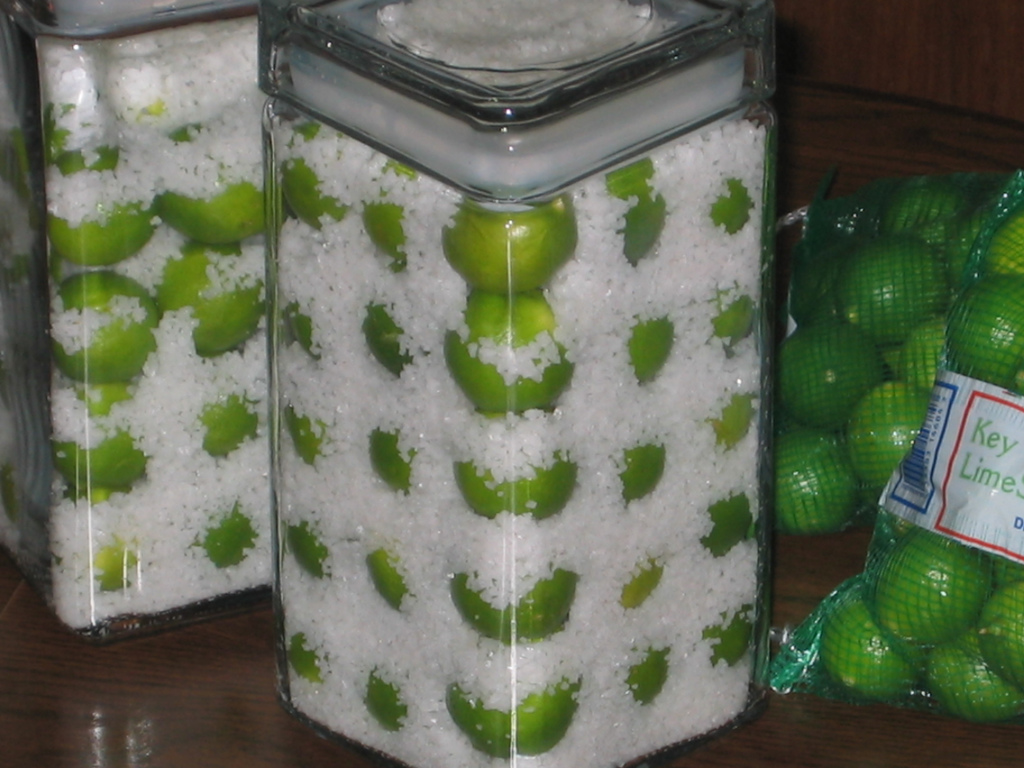
Chanh muối aging in glass containers

Pickled lime is a food that involves the pickling of limes to preserve them and add flavor.

== History ==
In the 19th and early 20th centuries, pickled limes were exported from the West Indies to areas in the Northeastern United States. In the mid-19th century, pickled limes were in demand in New York, and by the late 19th century they were mostly exported to Boston. During this time period, stores would display them in glass jars atop counters and sell them by the piece. Some customers purchased entire barrels of them at a time.

During the mid-19th century, pickled Key limes were exported from Florida to Boston.

== Recipe ==
Pickled limes, as known in 19th century New England, were key limes cut into chunks, submerged in brine and allowed to cure for three to four weeks. The importers successfully kept them classified at the lowest import tax rate, making it possible for retailers to sell them for a penny. This made them readily available to children, who commonly carried them to school. These were consumed by the fictional character Amy in the novel Little Women by Louisa May Alcott.

== Usage ==
A lime pickle from Goa - India

Pickled limes are sometimes eaten alone, as a snack. They are also an ingredient in the preparation of some sweet relishes.

Lime is an essential ingredient of many cuisines from India, and many varieties of pickles are made, such as sweetened lime pickle, salted pickle, and lime chutney. Preparation depends on region, but the principle remains largely the same: limes are diced, mixed with varying spices such as mustard seed, chili, and turmeric, then tossed with salt and left, covered, in the sun for several weeks.

In the United Kingdom, Indian restaurants often serve papadums with various condiments, including lime pickle, as a starter.

== See also ==
- List of fermented foods
- List of pickled foods
- Pickled fruit – Fruit that has been preserved by anaerobic fermentation in brine or immersion in vinegar
- Preserved lemon – Type of pickle
- Dried lime – Lime that has lost its water content after being dried under extensive sunlight
