= Bishop's crown =

Flowering plant cultivar

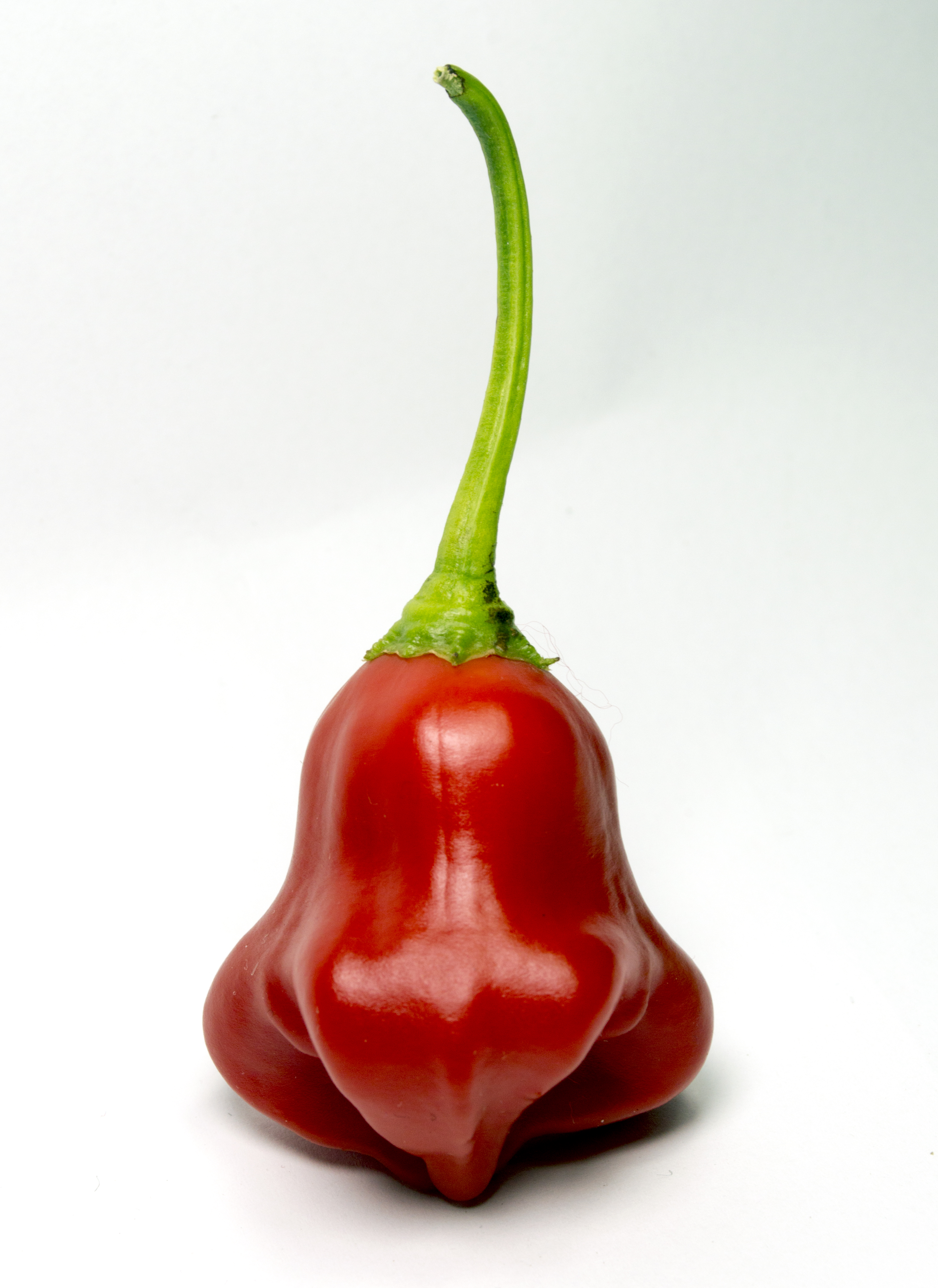
- Species: Capsicum baccatum
- Cultivar: Bishop's crown
- Heat: Medium
- Scoville scale: 5,000-30,000 (Note: This heat is very similar to that of the Bulgarian Carrot and Vegas Serrano peppers.) SHU

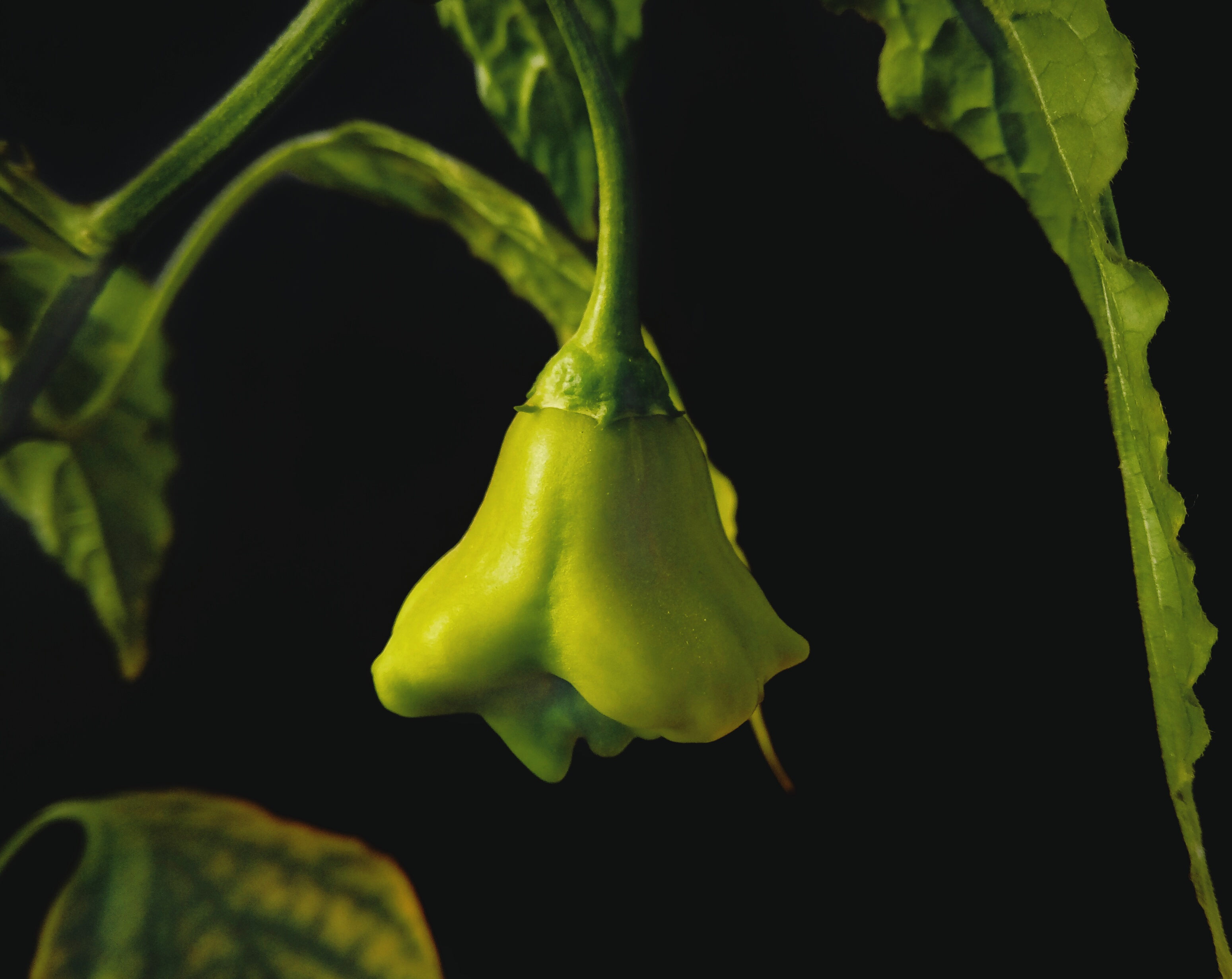
Bishop's crown fruit on its plant

The bishop's crown, Christmas bell, Nepalese bell, or joker's hat, is a pepper, a cultivar of the species Capsicum baccatum var. pendulum, named for its distinct, three-sided shape resembling a bishop's crown.

Although this variety can be found in Barbados, and is Capsicum baccatum var. pendulum, it may be indigenous to South America. Today, it is also grown in Europe, possibly brought there from Brazil by the Portuguese sometime in the 18th century.

The actual plant is relatively large, being 3-4 ft (0.8-1.2 m) in height. It produces 30 to 50 peculiar, three or four flat-winged, wrinkled pods. These somewhat flying saucer-like peppers grow to about 1.5 in (4 cm) wide.

The flesh inside each pepper is thin, yet crisp. They mature to red from a pale green colour about 90-100 days after the seedlings emerge.

The body of the peppers have very little heat, with the wings being sweet and mild.

== Other names ==
This pepper has numerous common names.

- Aji Copihue
- Balloon pepper
- Bell chili
- Bishop's crown
- Bishop's hat
- Campana
- Campane
- Chapeau du frade
- Christmas bell
- Corona de obispo
- Friar's hat
- Joker's hat
- Nepalese bell
- Orchid pepper
- PI 497974
- Picante campanilla
- Pimenta cambuci
- Ubatuba cambuci
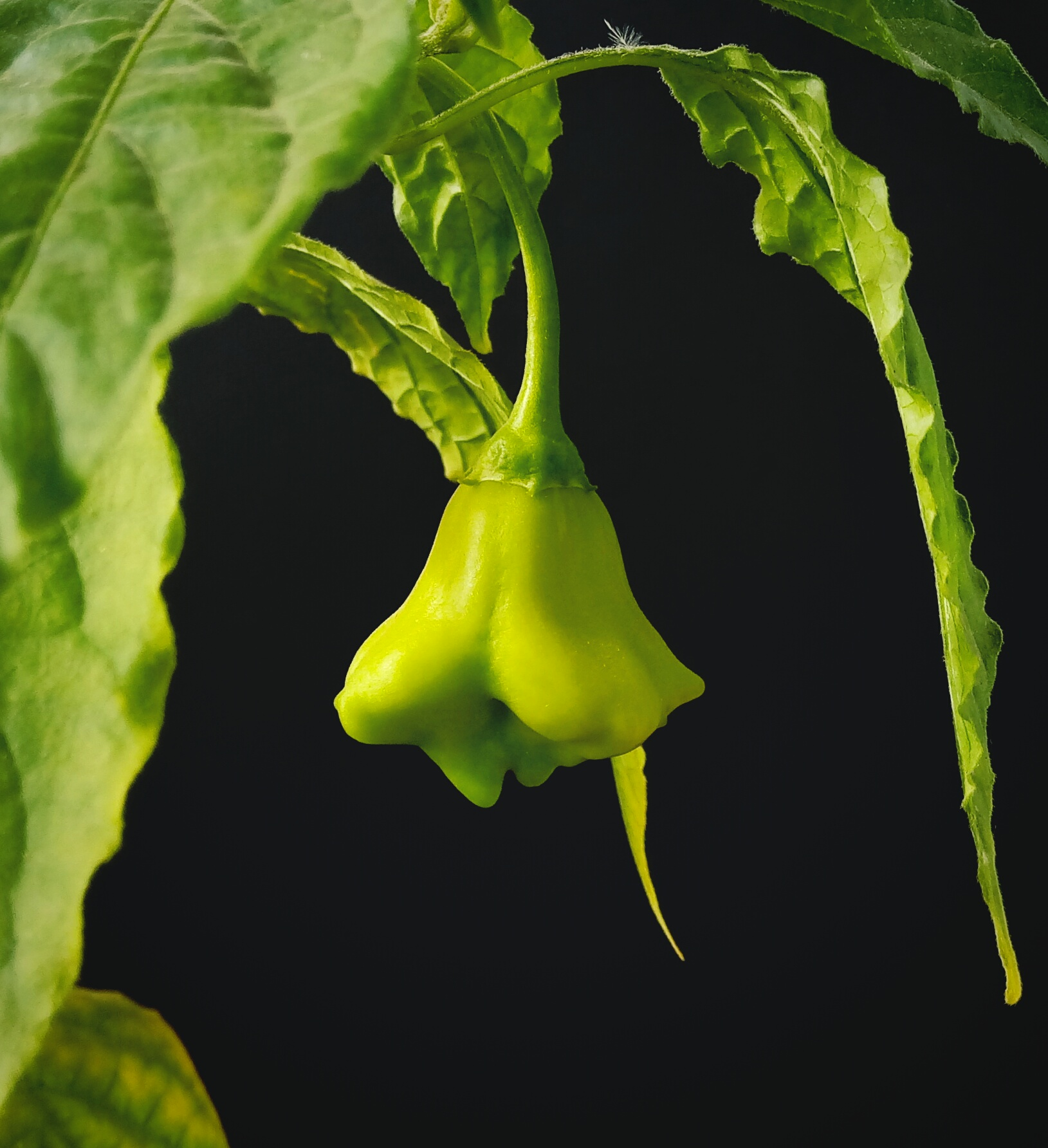
fruit

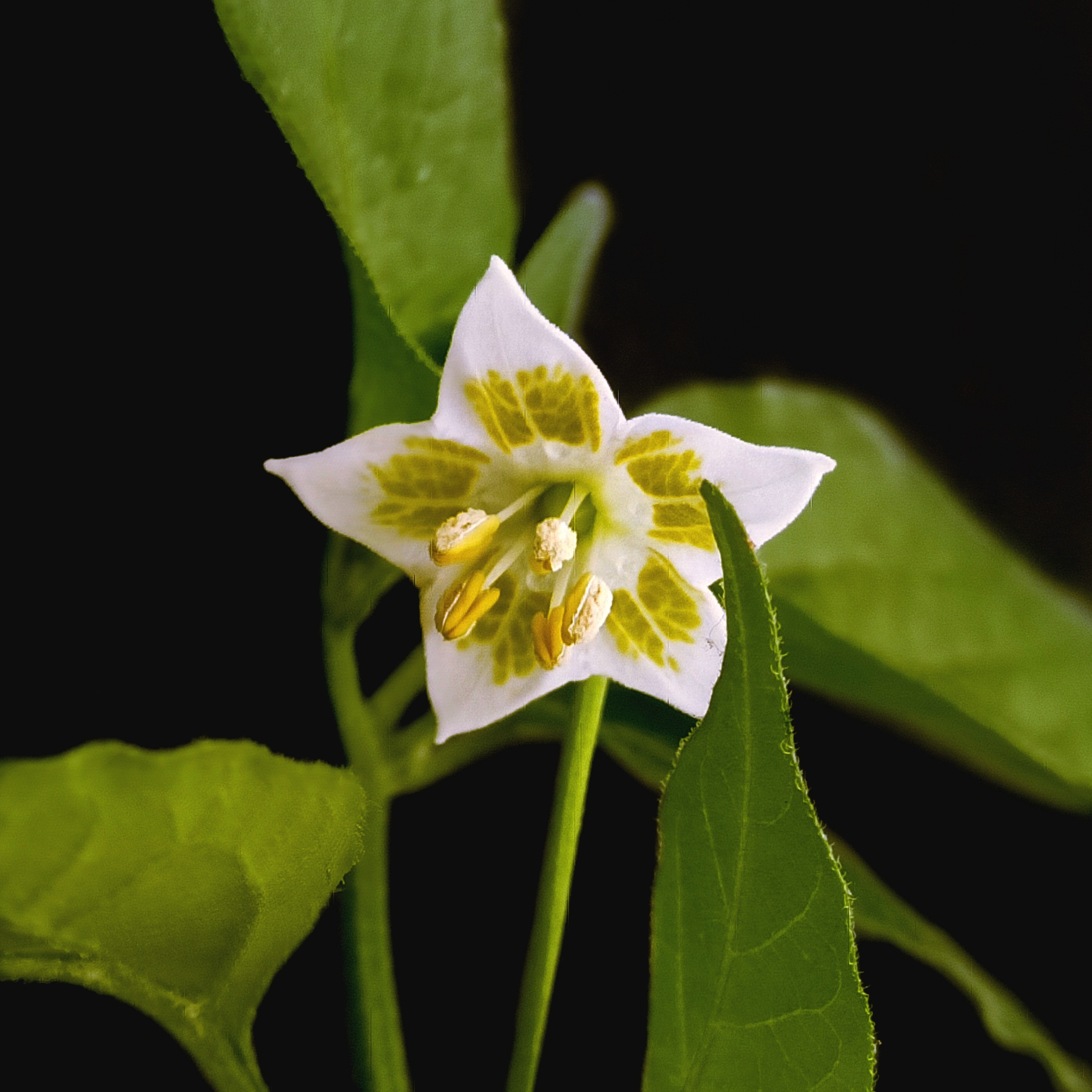
flower
