= Sweet piquanté pepper =

Variety of chili pepper

- Species: Capsicum baccatum
- Cultivar: Sweet piquanté pepper
- Origin: South Africa
- Heat: Low
- Scoville scale: 1,177 SHU

Sweet piquanté pepper is a cultivar of Capsicum baccatum grown in the Limpopo province of South Africa.

== See also ==
- Peppadew – a brand that sells pickled sweet piquanté pepper products
- Pimiento – a similar looking, larger pepper from the Capsicum annuum species
- List of Capsicum cultivars
