= Ají (sauce) =

Ají-based condiment from Andean cuisine

Ají sauce
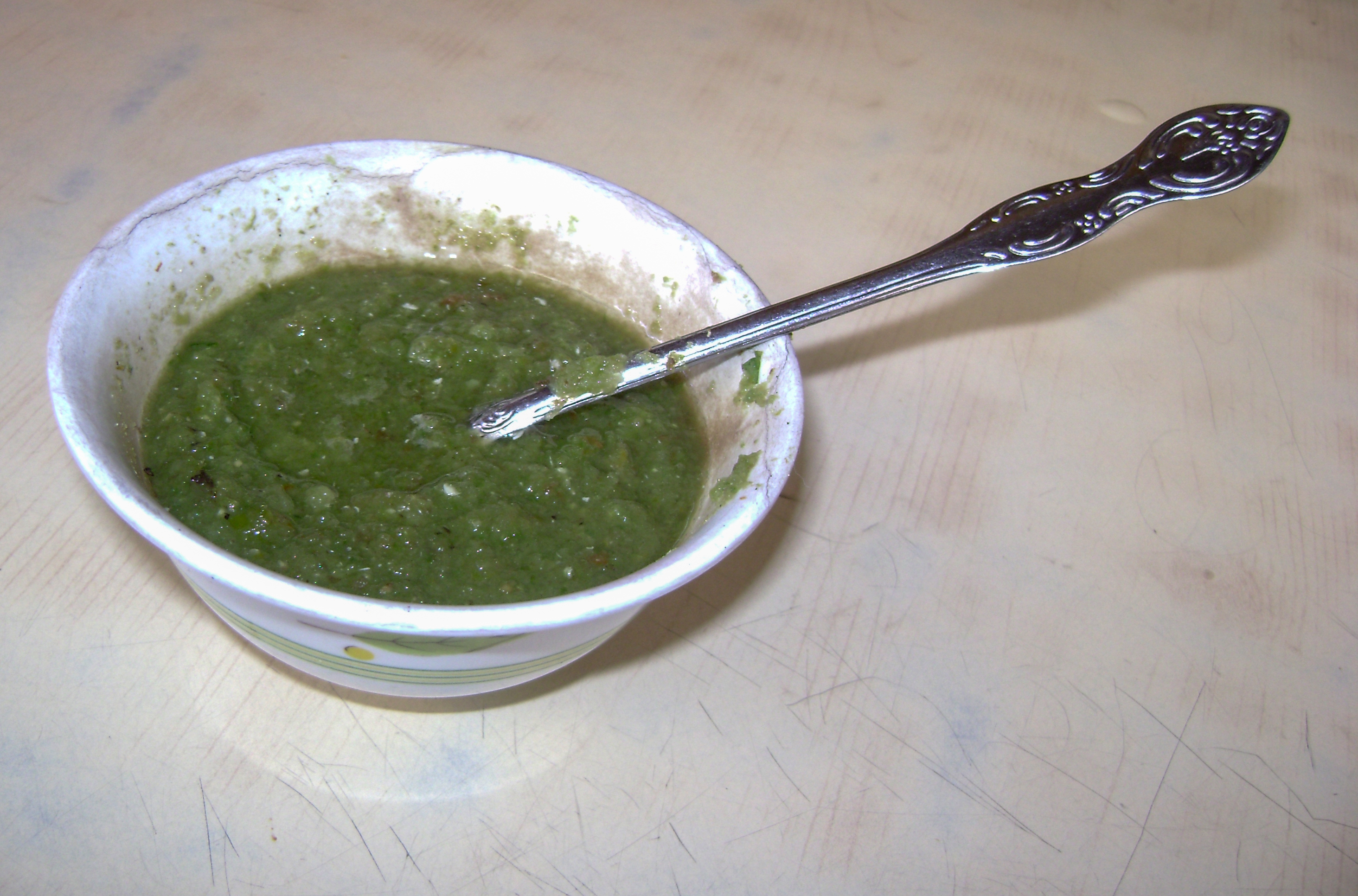
- Salsa de ají verde (green salsa de ají) in a market in Huaraz, Peru
- Type: Condiment/sauce
- Place of origin: Andes (Bolivia, Colombia, Ecuador, Peru)
- Region or state: Latin America
- Main ingredients: Ají peppers
- Ingredients generally used: Water, oil, garlic, cilantro, salt
- Variations: Ají chileno, ají negro, ají amarillo, ajílimojili, ají rocoto

Ají (Note: Spanish pronunciation: [aˈxi]) is a spicy sauce that contains ají peppers (Capsicum baccatum), oil, tomatoes, cilantro (coriander), garlic, onions, and water. It is served as a condiment to complement main dishes popular in Latin American cuisines, and prepared by blending its ingredients using a food processor or blender. Although ají sauce recipes can vary from person to person, there are generally country-specific and region-specific varieties.

== Description ==
Ají is a spicy sauce made from ají peppers that is usually served to accompany other dishes in a variety of Latin American cuisines. Its most basic ingredients include ají peppers, water, oil, garlic, cilantro, and salt. Ingredients are usually blended together using a blender or food processor.

Ají has been prepared in Andean countries such as Bolivia, Colombia, and Peru since at least the time of the Incas, who called it uchu. It is usually added to other foods such as anticuchos, chugchucaras, soup, chorizo, or empanadas.

In Colombia and Ecuador, food is traditionally milder, so ají can be added to almost any dish to add flavor and spice. Recipes vary dramatically from person to person and from region to region, depending on preference.

The core ingredient of ají sauce, ají peppers (Capsicum baccatum), was originally grown in South America. While these peppers range 30,000–50,000 Scoville Heat Units, depending on the variety of pepper and preparation technique, the spice level of ají sauce is variable.

== Varieties ==
=== Chile ===
A popular hot sauce known as ají chileno in Chile is made with peppers. Chileans also make pebre, a salsa of peppers combined with tomatoes, cilantro, onions, oil, and vinegar which is typically eaten with bread.

=== Ecuador ===
In Ecuador, ají sauce is prepared using one of the over 30 ají pepper varieties available in the country. These ají peppers vary in spice level and this, combined with the amount of water used to dilute the sauce, can create variation in the level of spice between sauces. Some regions are also known for their addition of fruits, in addition to the basic ingredients, which leads to further variety of the sauce within the country.

=== Northwest Amazonia ===
A variety of ají sauce, ají negro (also called Ommaï, Kígai, Do-Hmepa, Ualako), is made by the indigenous peoples of Northwest Amazonia. This variety is prepared using the juice of bitter manioc.

=== Peru ===
Peru is known for its variety of ají sauce, ají amarillo sauce. This variety uses ají amarillo and is often yellow. Ají amarillo is used widely across Peru as an addition to sauces. The spice level of ají amarillo is comparable to serrano peppers, registering at 15,000 on the Scoville Heat Unit Scale, although sometimes registering at 30,000 to 50,000 SHU. Oftentimes this variety of ají sauce is mixed with mayonnaise, crema, or sour cream to accompany potatoes, sandwiches, meat and ceviche.

=== Puerto Rico ===
A variety of ají sauce, ajilimojili, is from Puerto Rico. It is made with aji dulce peppers and is notable for its green color.

=== United States ===
In the US, commercially prepared varieties of ají sauce, including aji rocoto hot sauce and aji amarillo sauce, can be purchased in Latin American markets or specialty food stores. The pepper required for some varieties of ají sauce, including that of the Peruvian ají amarillo sauce, is not grown commercially in the US.

== Gallery ==
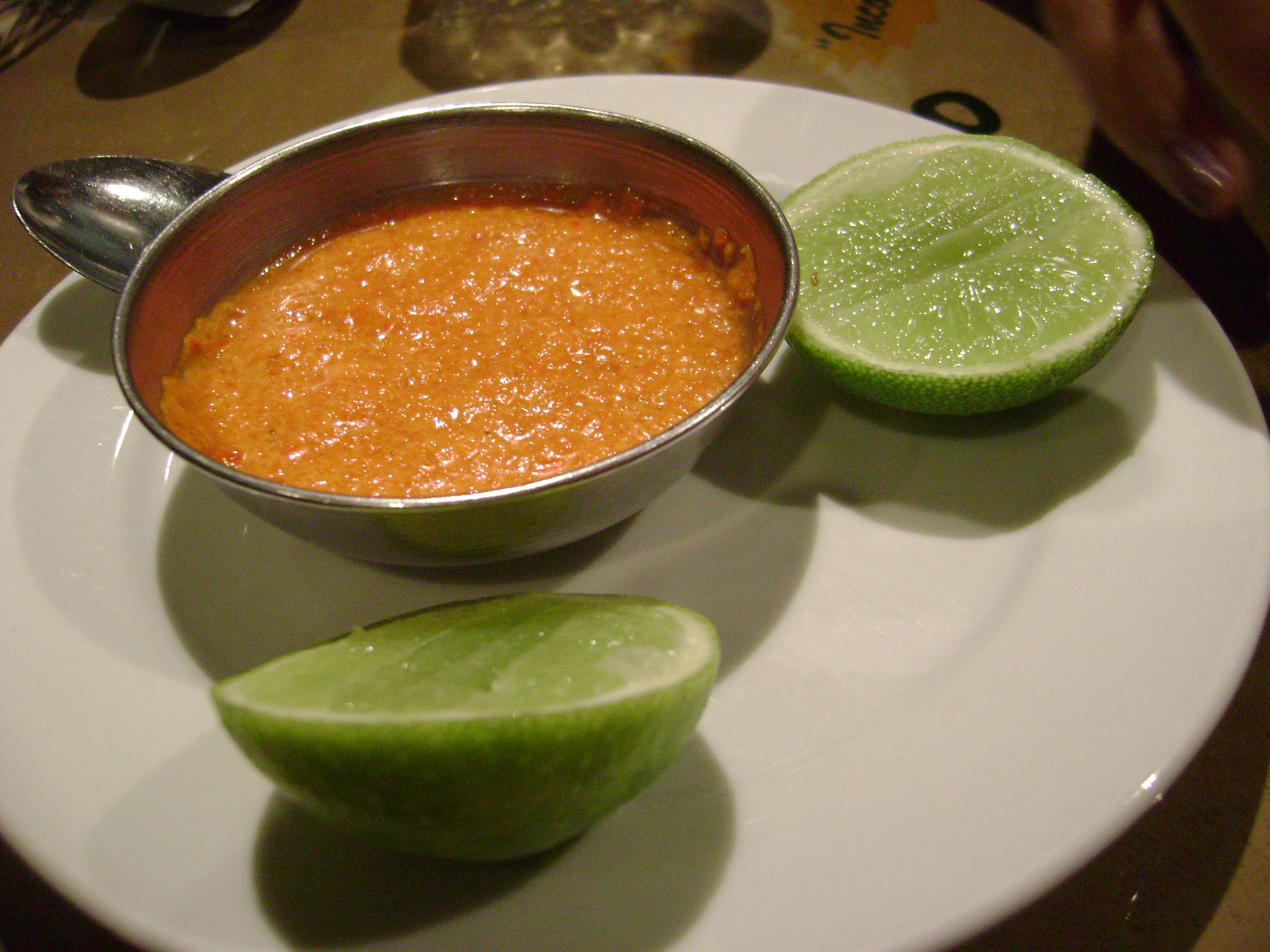
Salsa de ají and key lime from Peru

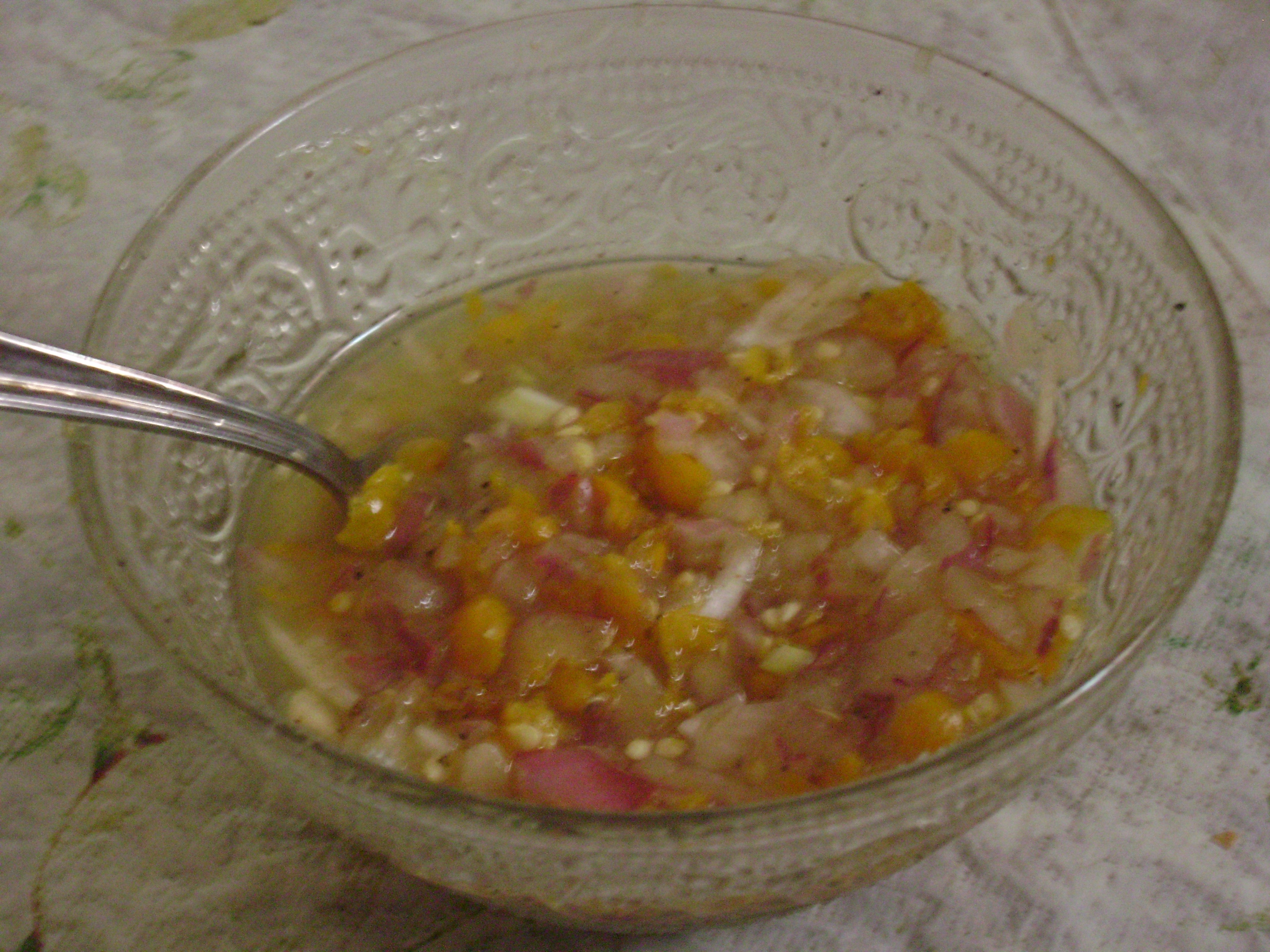
Ají charapita

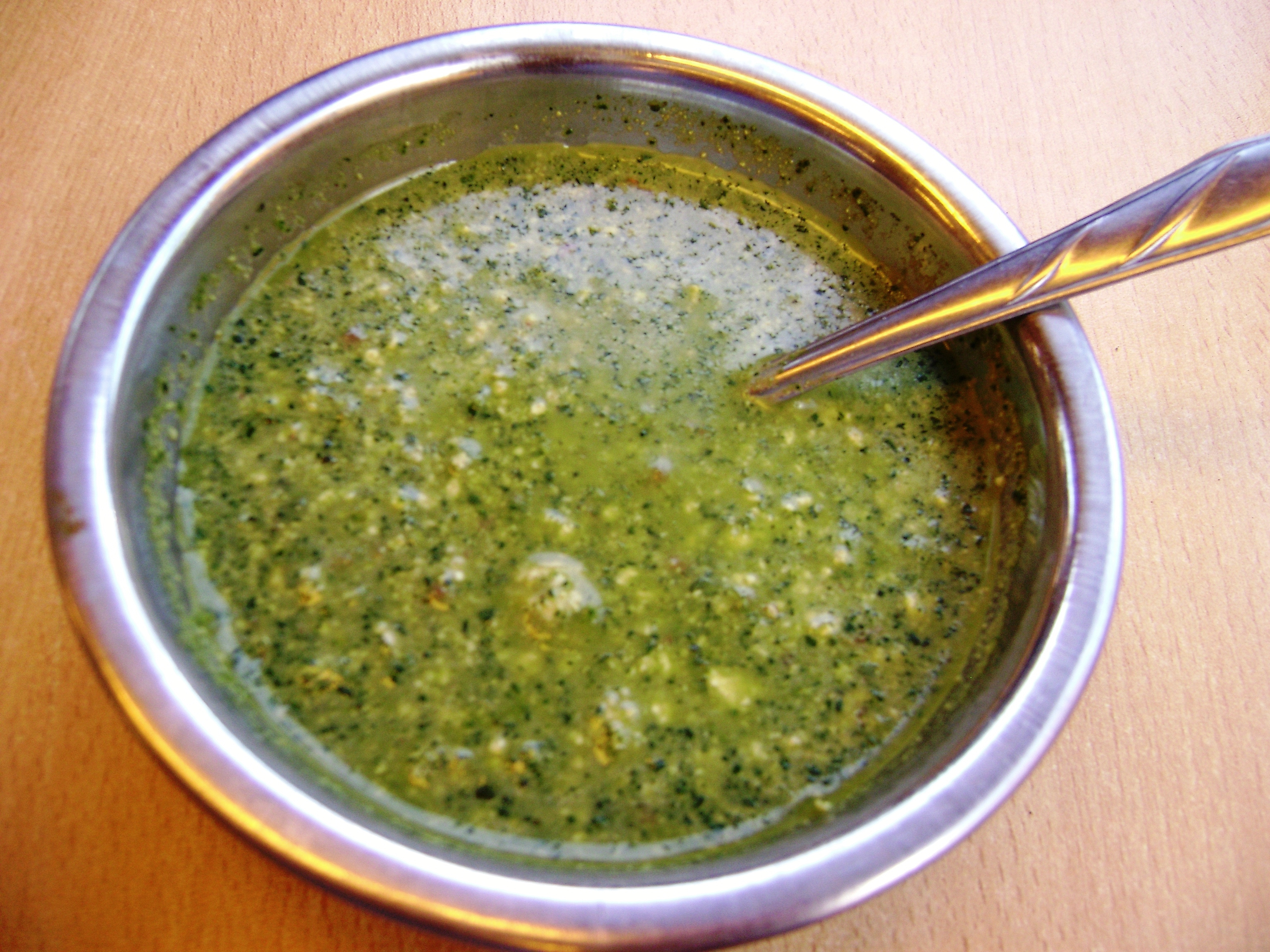
Crema de ají

== See also ==
- List of condiments
- List of dips
- List of sauces
