= Peppadew =

Brand name of a sweet and spicy pickled pepper grown in South Africa

Peppadew International
- Industry: Food manufacture
- Founded: 1995
- Headquarters: Johannesburg, South Africa
- Area served: Worldwide
- Products: Sweet piquanté peppers, Goldew peppers, roasted peppers, jalapeño peppers, pickled onions, pasta sauces, relishes, hot sauces
- Website: www.peppadew.com

Peppadew is a trademarked brand name registered to South African food company Peppadew International (Pty) Ltd. The word is commonly used to refer to a pickled version of the Juanita pepper.

Peppadew International produces and markets a variety of food products under the Peppadew brand, including jalapeño peppers, Goldew peppers, pickled onions, hot sauces, pasta sauces and relishes, but is best known for its sweet piquanté pepper (a cultivar of Capsicum baccatum) grown in the Limpopo province of South Africa.

== History ==
Peppadew International and the Peppadew brand was founded in 1995 after founder Johan Steenkamp discovered a sweet piquanté pepper in the Eastern Cape of South Africa. Upon discovery of the pepper, plant breeders' rights were applied for and obtained with the South African Department of Agriculture, Forestry and Fisheries in order to protect the species. Johan Steenkamp started cultivating and processing the peppers in the Tzaneen region of South Africa, where Peppadew International's factory is still based today. Steenkamp later sold his interest in the company in 2004.

Peppadew International were the first to market this type of pepper. Although the pepper is sometimes described as a cross between a pepper and a tomato, this description is not botanically accurate, and refers only to the resemblance in color and size between red peppers and cherry tomatoes.

In 2011 Bon Appetit published a recipe for Pimento Mac & Cheese calling for Peppadews, then had to run a follow-up piece telling readers how to find the peppers. In 2016 the Baltimore Sun reported that there was a black market for the pepper's seeds.

== Processing ==
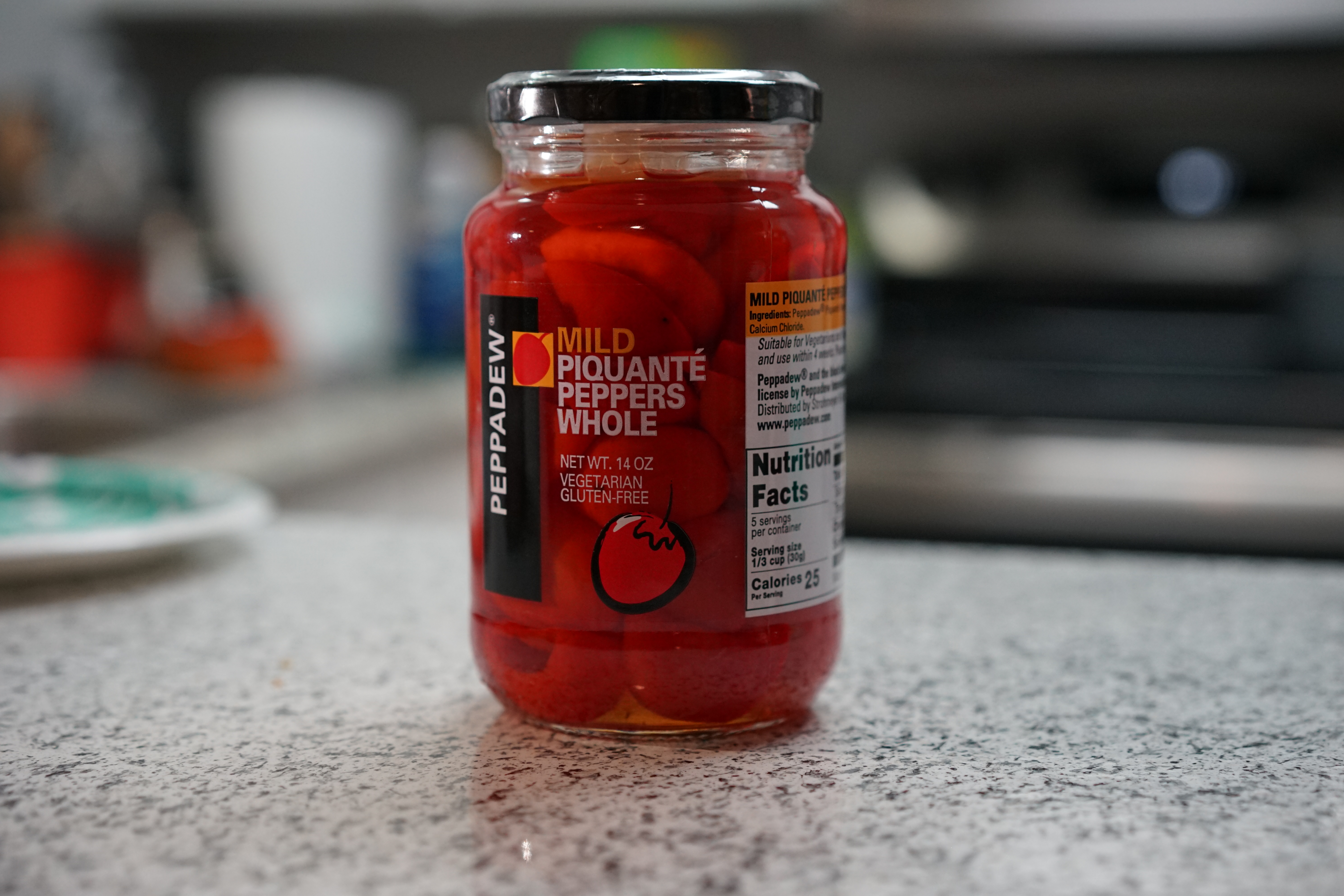
Peppadew International is best known for its sweet Piquanté Pepper products

Peppadew brand peppers are grown into seedlings from hand-selected seeds for six to eight weeks. They are then transferred to contract farmers who then grow the peppers under the guidance of Peppadew International's agricultural team. The raw peppers are then harvested and sent to Peppadew International's processing facility where the peppers are de-seeded, treated and bottled in a unique brine.

== See also ==
- List of Capsicum cultivars
