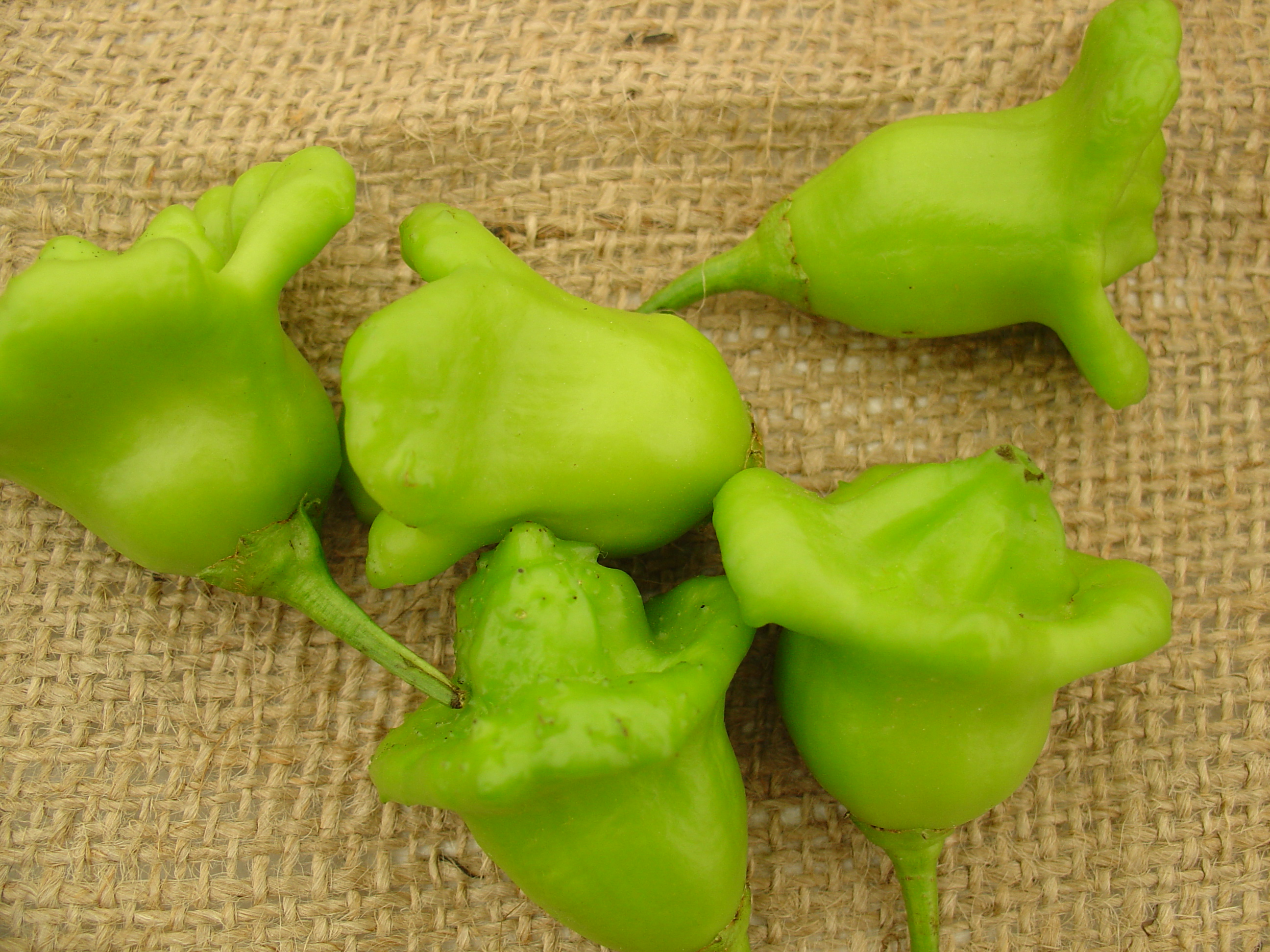
- Bishop's crown fruits

Scientific classification
- Kingdom: Plantae
- Clade: Tracheophytes
- Clade: Angiosperms
- Clade: Eudicots
- Clade: Asterids
- Order: Solanales
- Family: Solanaceae
- Genus: Capsicum
- Species: C. baccatum

Binomial name
- Capsicum baccatum L.

Synonyms
- Capsicum cerasiflorum Link; Capsicum chamaecerasus Nees; Capsicum ciliare Willd.; Capsicum conicum Vell.; Capsicum microcarpum Cav.; Capsicum pendulum Willd.; Capsicum praetermissum Heiser & P.G.Sm.; Capsicum pulchellum Salisb.; Capsicum umbilicatum Vell.

= Capsicum baccatum =

Species of plant

Capsicum baccatum, also simply referred to as ají (Spanish: [aˈxi]), is a perennial shrub member of the genus Capsicum, and is one of the five domesticated chili pepper species. Pungency varies widely among cultivars, ranging from nearly heatless types, such as the Peppadew, to hot varieties; the widely grown ají amarillo registers approximately 30,000 to 50,000 on the Scoville heat unit scale.

== Description ==
Chili pepper varieties in the C. baccatum species have white or cream-colored flowers and typically have a green or gold corolla. The flowers are either insect, wind or self-pollinated. The fruit pods of the baccatum species have been cultivated into a wide variety of shapes and sizes, unlike other capsicum species, which tend to have a characteristic shape. The fruits typically hang down in domesticated cultivars (C. baccatum var. pendulum), and point upwards in wild forms (C. baccatum var. baccatum). The fruits of wild C. baccatum fall off the plant when ripe, unlike modern cultivars in which the fruits stays firm on the plant.

== Uses ==
Cultivated baccatum (C. baccatum var. pendulum) is the domesticated pepper of choice of Bolivia, Colombia, Ecuador, Peru, and Chile. The Moche culture often represented fruits and vegetables in their art, including ají amarillo peppers. South American farmers also grow C. baccatum as ornamental plants for export.

=== Cultivars ===
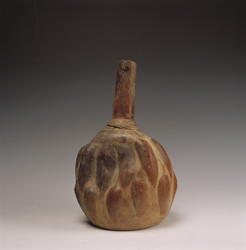
Ceramic shaped like ají amarillo peppers. Moche culture. Larco Museum collection

This species of chili pepper includes the following cultivars:

- Ají amarillo, also called amarillo chili and ají escabeche
- Bishop's crown
- Lemon drop, ají limón or ají limo
- Piquanté pepper
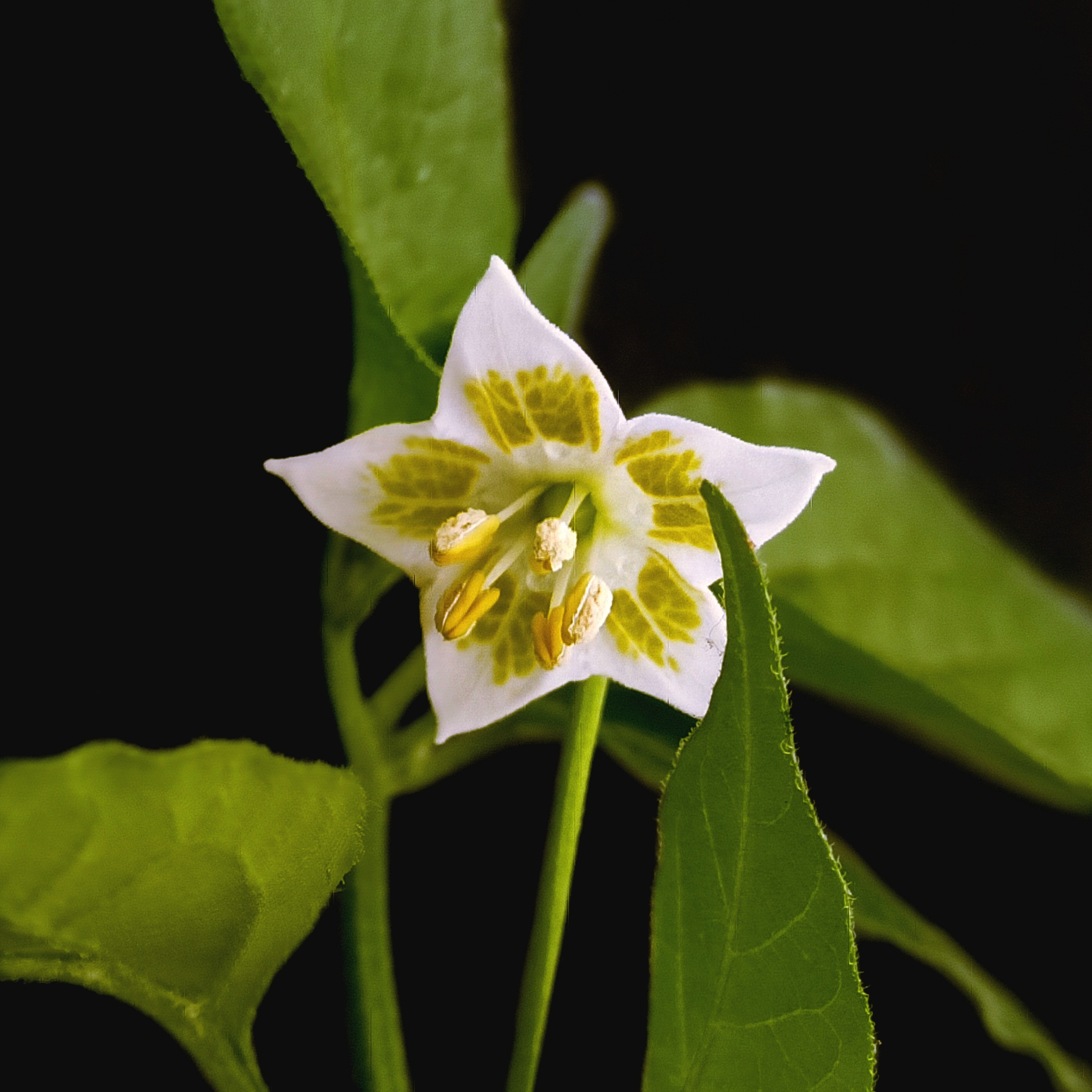
Capsicum baccatum flower

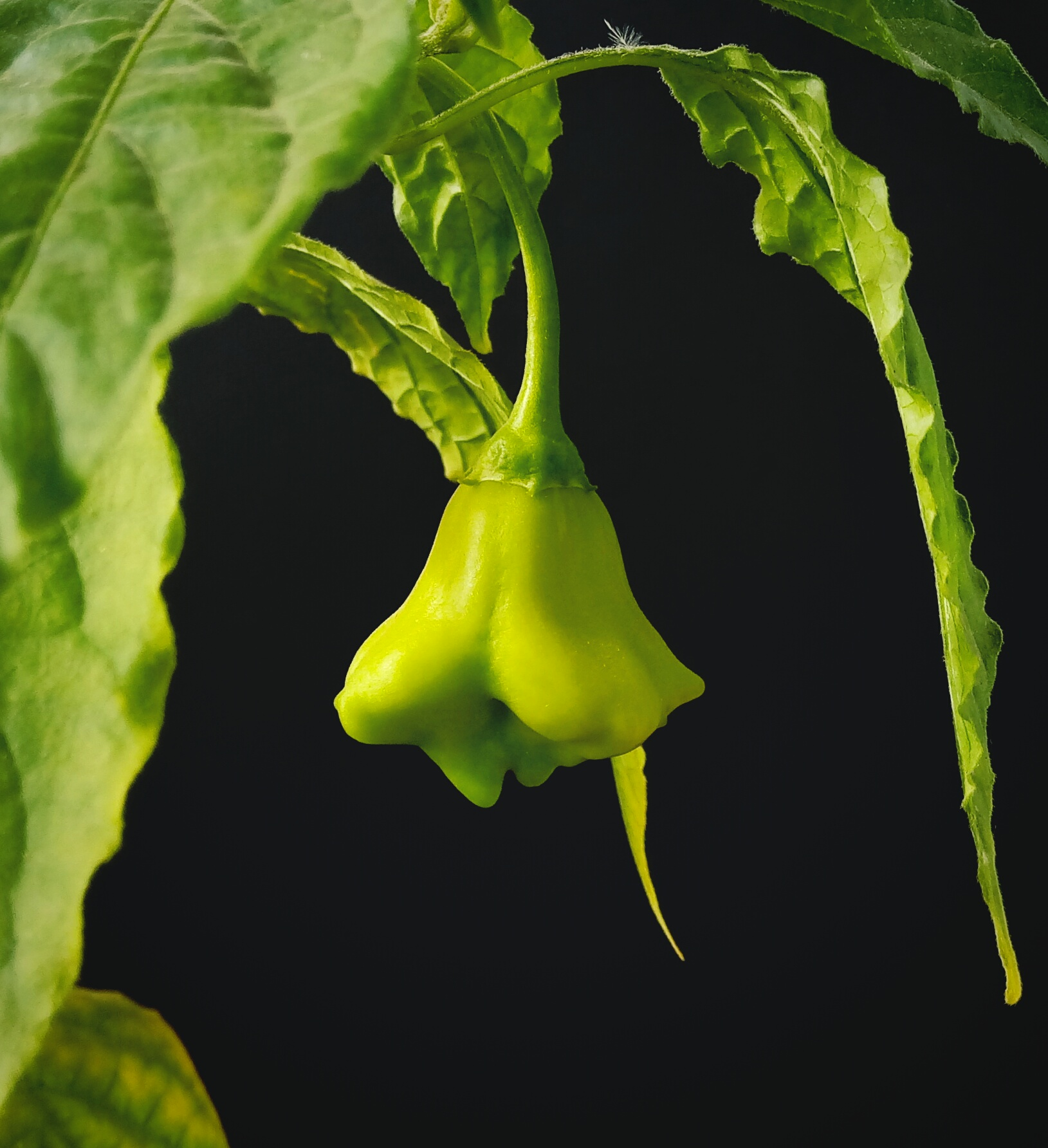
Bishop's crown fruit on the plant

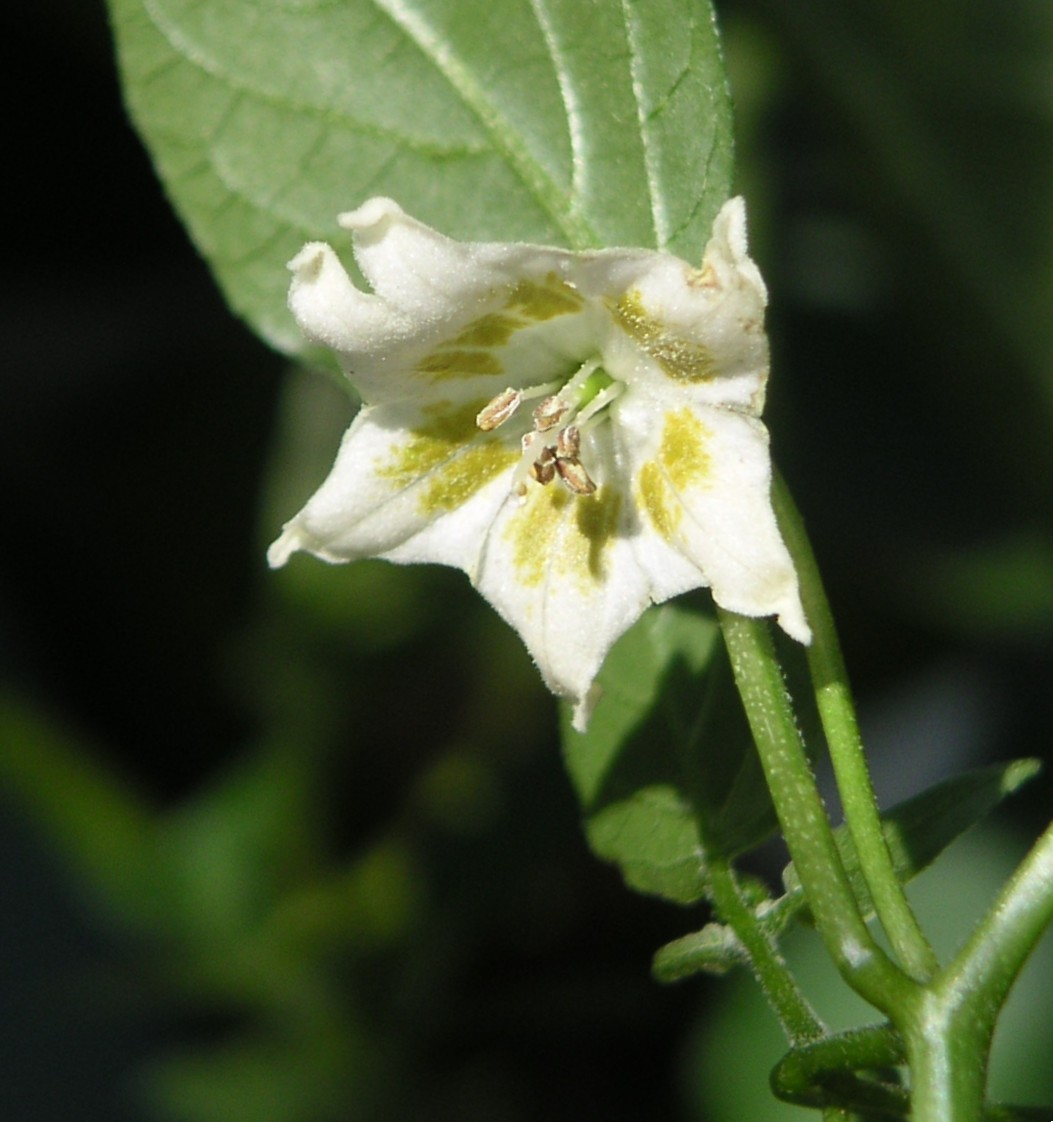
Flower

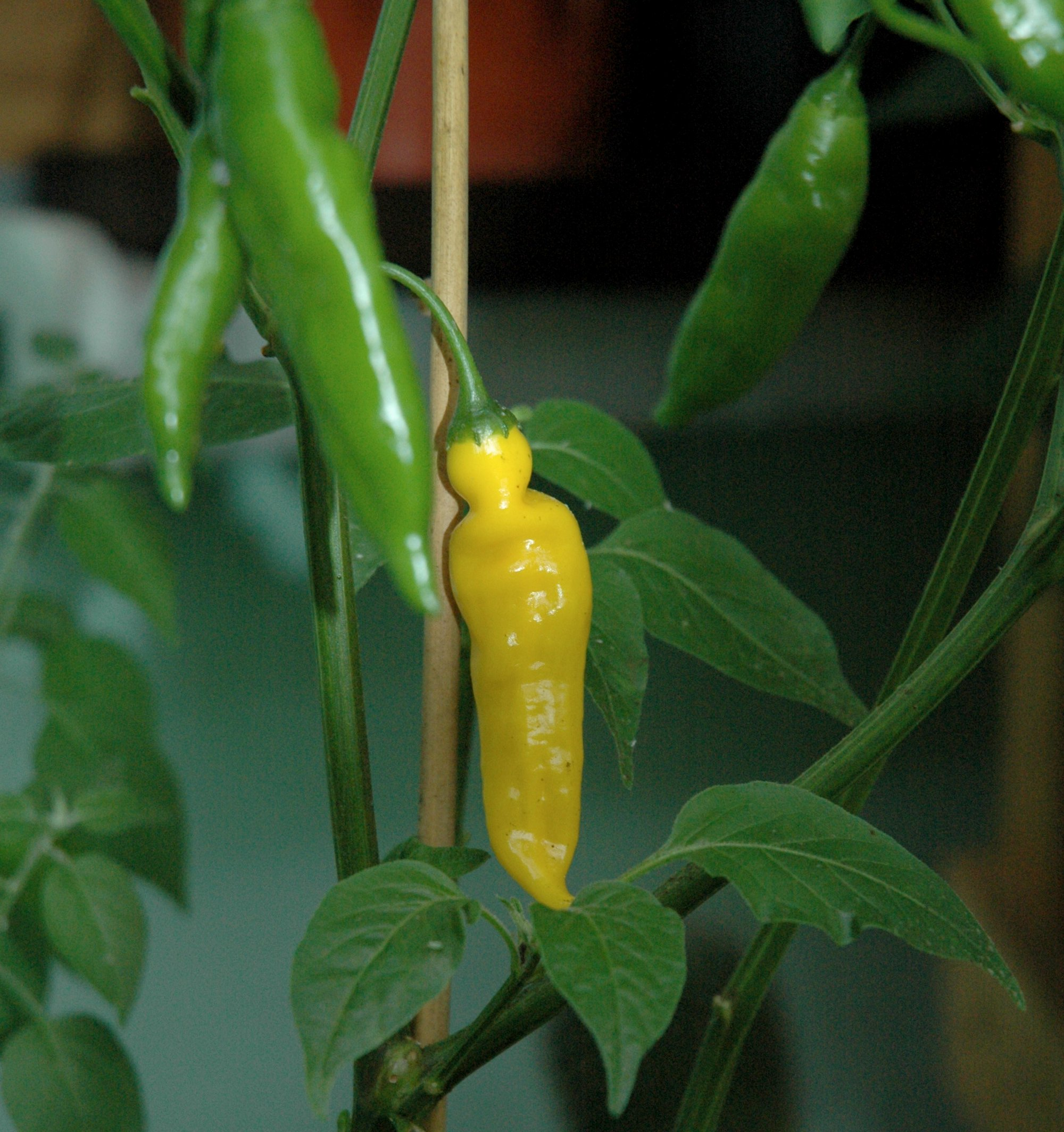
Cultivar "Lemon Drop"

=== Culinary use ===
The C. baccatum species, notably the ají amarillo chili, has its origins in ancient Peru and across the Andean region of South America. It is typically associated with Peruvian cuisine, and is considered part of its condiment trinity together with red onion and coriander. Ají amarillo literally means "yellow chili"; however, the yellow color appears only when cooked, as the mature pods are bright orange.

Ají amarillo is one of the ingredients of Peruvian and Bolivian cuisines. It is used as a condiment, especially in many dishes and sauces. In Peru, the chilis are mostly used fresh, and in Bolivia, dried and ground. Common dishes with ají amarillo are the Peruvian stew ají de gallina ("hen chili"), Papa a la Huancaína, and the Bolivian fricasé Paceño, among others. In Ecuadorian cuisine, ají amarillo, onion, and lemon juice (amongst others) are served in a separate bowl with many meals as an optional condiment. In Colombian, Peruvian, and Ecuadorian cuisines, ají sauce is also a common condiment.

The Ají Amarillo pepper has been named the "Flavor of the Year" for 2025 by McCormick & Company, a prominent spice company. This pepper is expected to see a 59% increase in menu appearances over the next four years.

Capsicum baccatum var. pendulum, popularly known as dedo-de-moça (lady-finger) is specially used on Brazilian cuisine, specially in the South and Southeast regions.

== Etymology ==
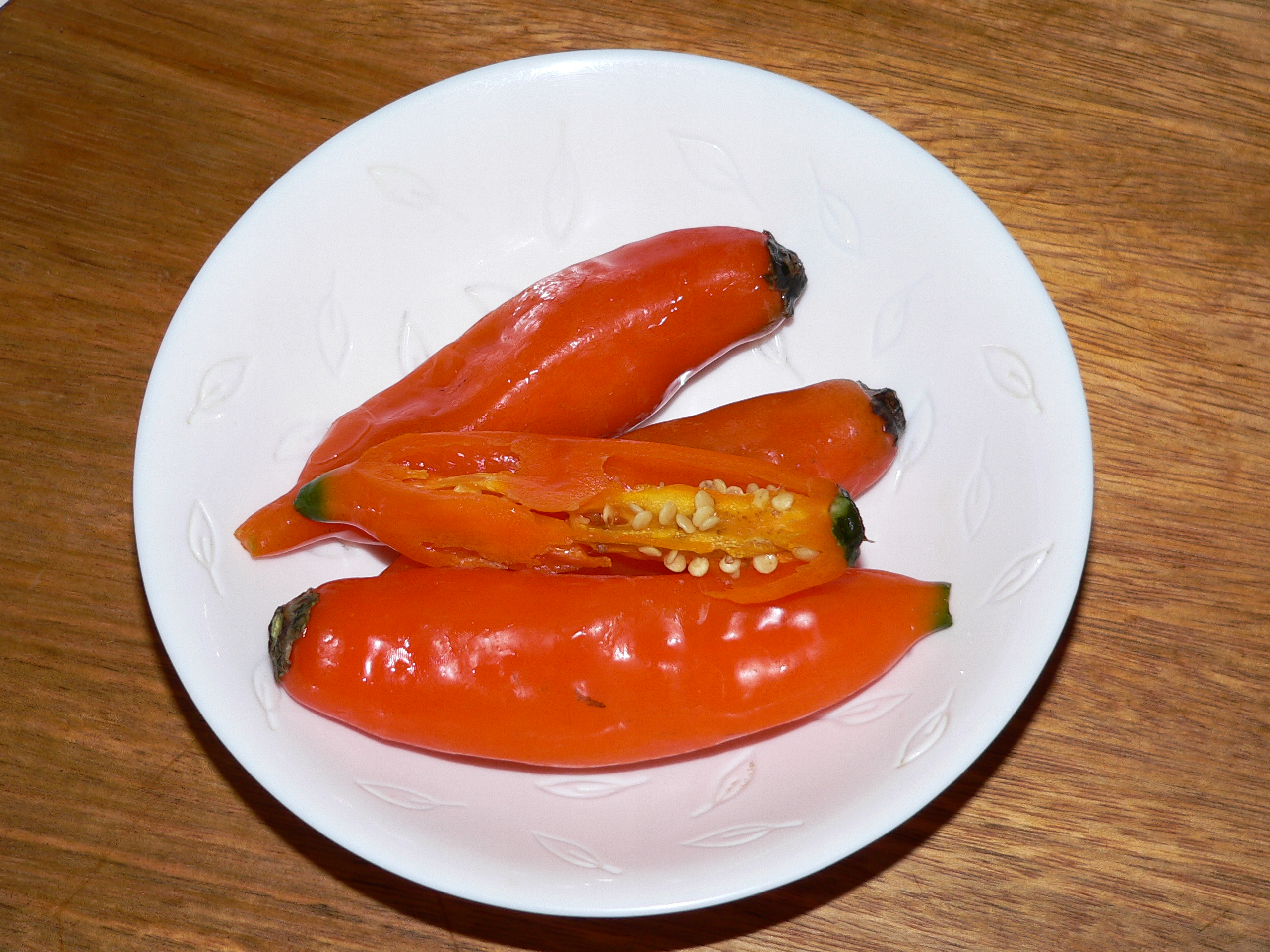
Ají amarillo is actually bright orange before cooking, which changes its color to yellow

Some form of the word ají has been used since approximately 4600 BCE. It was first used in the protolanguage Otomanguean. It then spread along with the Capsicum fruit from Central and South America to other pepper-growing regions. Capsicum baccatum is still referred to as ají, while other peppers are referred to as "pepper" via the Spanish conquistadors noting the similarity in heat sensation to black pepper.

The binomial name is composed of Capsicum, from the Greek kapos, and Baccatum, meaning "berry-like."

== See also ==
- List of Capsicum cultivars
