= List of points of interest in Albuquerque, New Mexico =

The following is a list of points of interest in Albuquerque, New Mexico:

== Points of interest ==
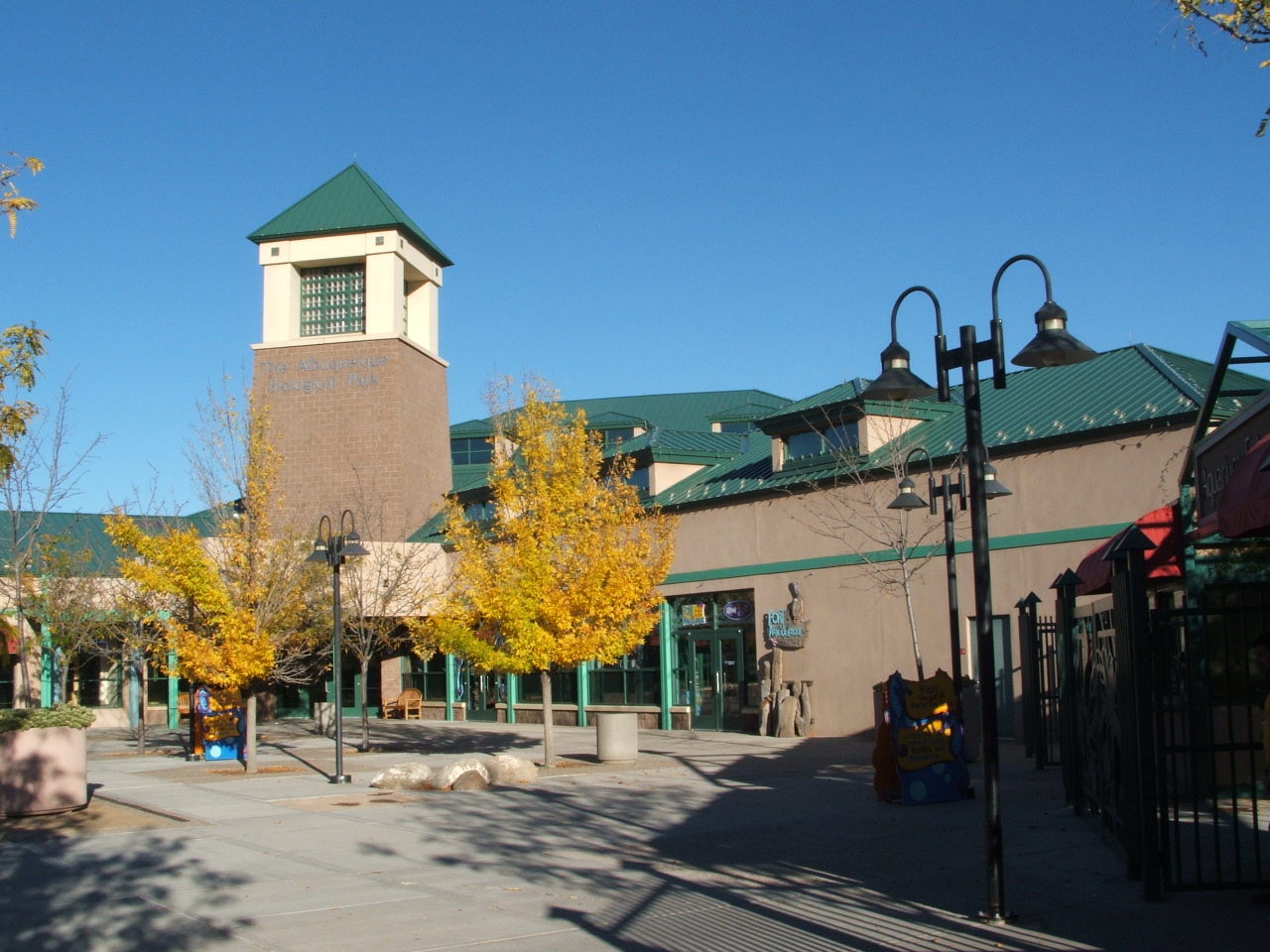
The Albuquerque Aquarium

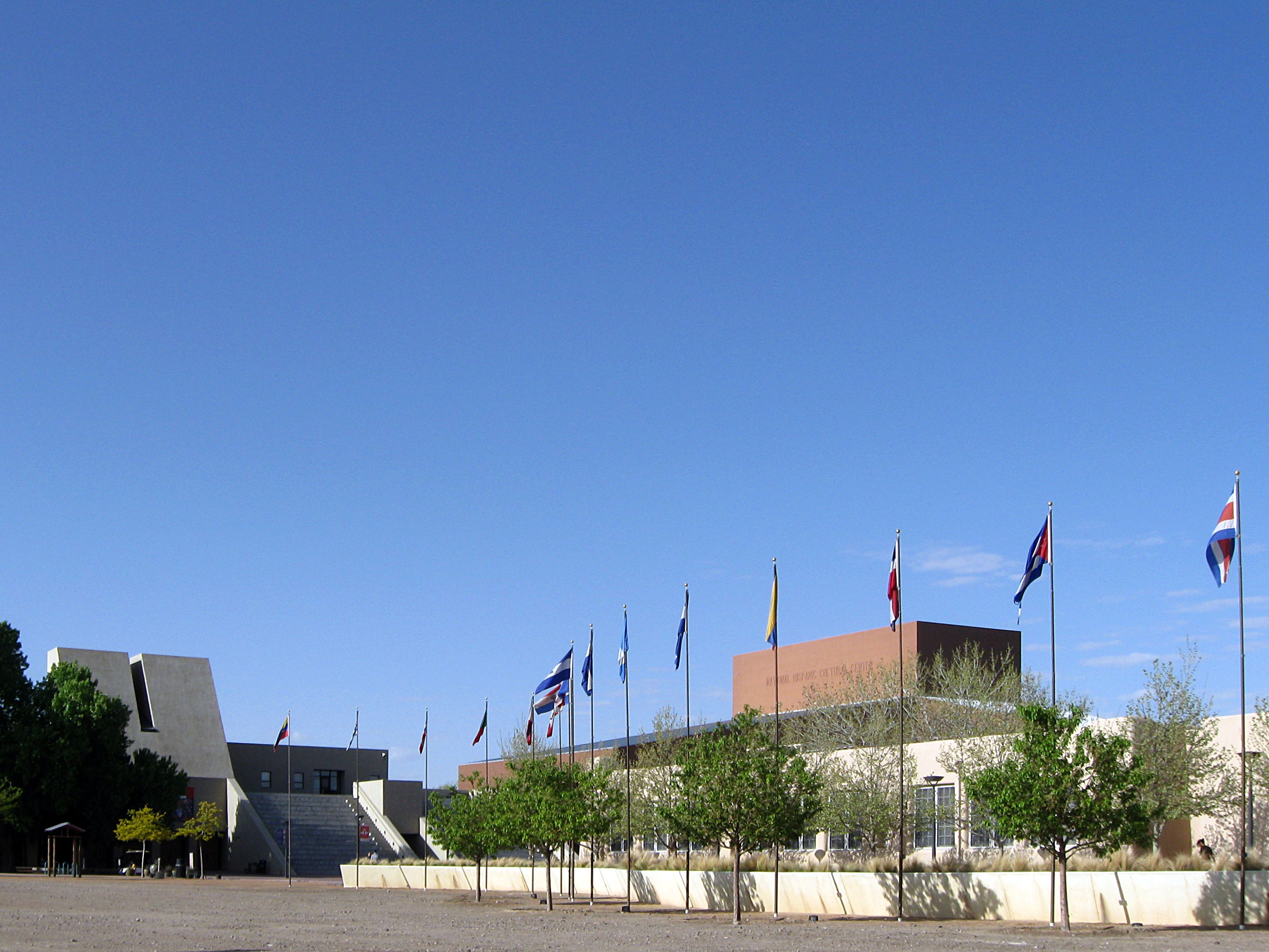
The National Hispanic Cultural Center

- Albuquerque Biological Park
- Albuquerque Aquarium
- Albuquerque Museum of Art and History (the Albuquerque Museum)
- American International Rattlesnake Museum
- Anderson-Abruzzo Albuquerque International Balloon Museum
- ¡Explora! Science Center and Children's Museum
- Indian Pueblo Cultural Center
- KiMo Theater
- Kirtland Air Force Base
- Maxwell Museum of Anthropology
- National Museum of Nuclear Science & History
- National Hispanic Cultural Center
- New Mexico Holocaust & Intolerance Museum
- New Mexico Museum of Natural History and Science
- Old Town Albuquerque
- Petroglyph National Monument
- Rio Grande Botanic Garden
- Rio Grande Nature Center State Park
- Rio Grande Valley State Park
- Rio Grande Zoo
- Sandia National Laboratories
- Sandia Peak Aerial Tram
- Tingley Beach
- University of New Mexico
- University of New Mexico Arboretum
- University of New Mexico Art Museum (includes Jonson Gallery)
- Unser Racing Museum

== See also ==
- List of historic landmarks in Albuquerque
