= List of botanical gardens and arboretums in New Mexico =

This list of botanical gardens and arboretums in New Mexico is intended to include all significant botanical gardens and arboretums in the U.S. state of New Mexico

Name	Image	Affiliation	City
Albuquerque BioPark Botanic Garden			Albuquerque
Fabian Garcia Science Center		New Mexico State University	Las Cruces
Living Desert Zoo and Gardens State Park			Carlsbad
Santa Fe Botanical Garden			Santa Fe
University of New Mexico Arboretum		University of New Mexico	Albuquerque

== See also ==
- List of botanical gardens and arboretums in the United States
