= Tingley Beach =

Recreational area in Albuquerque, New Mexico

Coordinates: 35.0848°N 106.6730°W

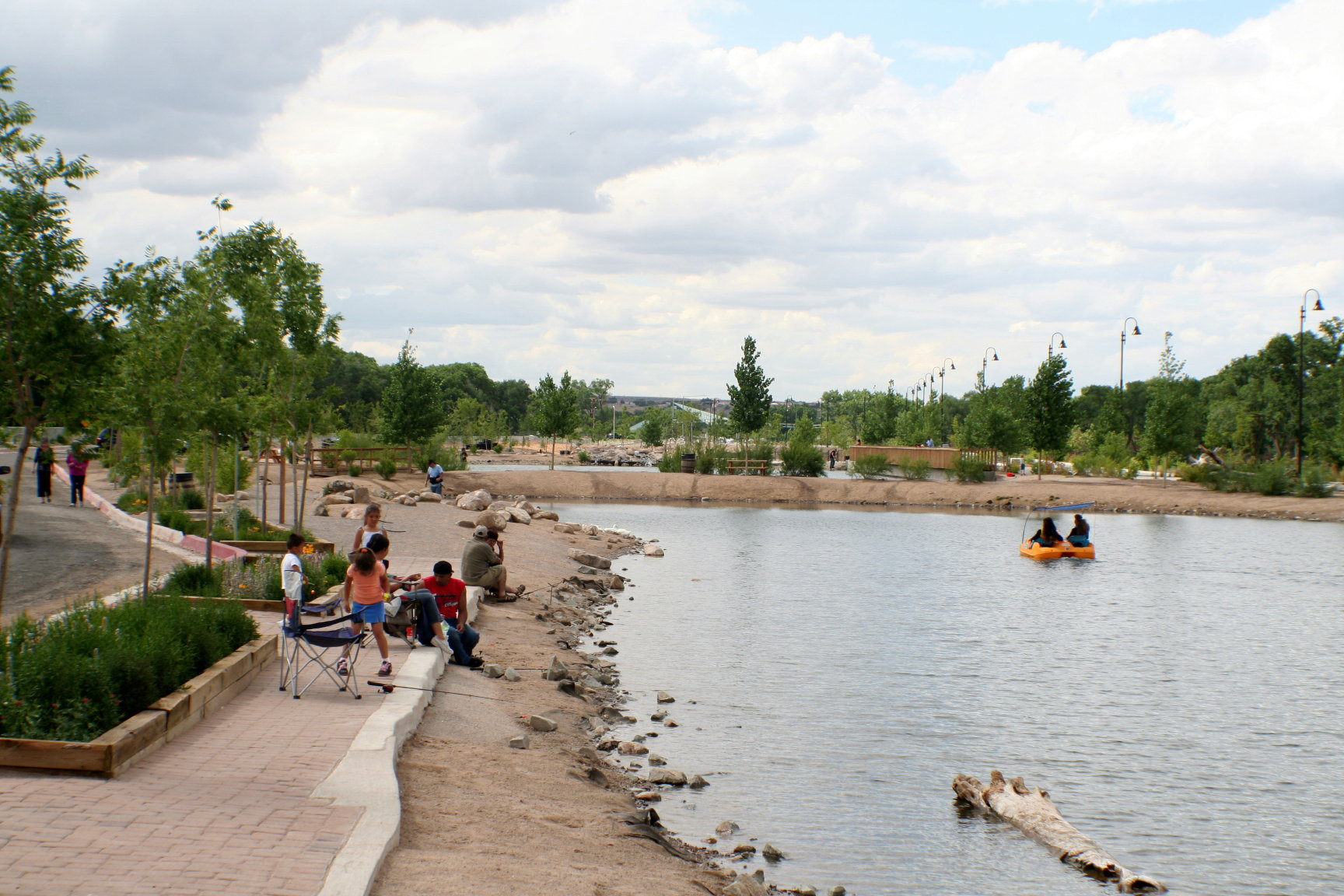
Tingley Beach

Tingley Beach is a recreational area in Albuquerque, New Mexico, located south of Central Avenue on the east side of the Rio Grande. It is part of the Albuquerque Biological Park complex.

== History ==
The series of ponds, originally known as Conservancy Beach, was built during the 1930s by diverting water from the Rio Grande and later renamed in honor of Clyde Tingley, the 11th governor of New Mexico. After the beach was closed to swimmers in the 1950s, it was used primarily for fishing. The Association of Zoos and Aquariums awarded Tingley Beach with the 2008 North American Conservation Award.

Tingley Beach was renovated starting in 2004 and reopened to the public in November 2005. The facility features fishing ponds for adults and children, a model boating pond, paddle boats, nature trails, a gift shop, a restaurant, and a narrow-gauge railroad connecting Tingley Beach with the ABQ BioPark Botanic Garden, ABQ BioPark Aquarium, and ABQ BioPark Zoo.
