= NuMex =

Agricultural moniker

NuMex is the moniker used for products created by the Agricultural Experiment Station of New Mexico State University.

The AES is responsible for a large variety of unusual agricultural cultivars, including a key breed of onion simply called the Numex, and a great many cultivars of chili pepper, including the Numex Twilight, a curious breed with upright fruit which starts purple and then turns yellow, orange, and red. Including the green leaves, this plant has every color of the rainbow except blue. Another famous sort from NuMex is the NuMex Suave, which is a heatless habanero, in the colours red and orange, preserving the taste and looks of a habanero, but without the intensive heat of a habanero.

== History ==
The NuMex designation has been in use since at least 1975, when the NuMex Big Jim was introduced by Dr. Roy Nakayama of the Chile Pepper Institute. Between 1985 and 2016, the NuMex designation was used for an additional 45 cultivars of chili pepper.
