= ABQ BioPark Aquarium =

Aquarium in Albuquerque, New Mexico, United States

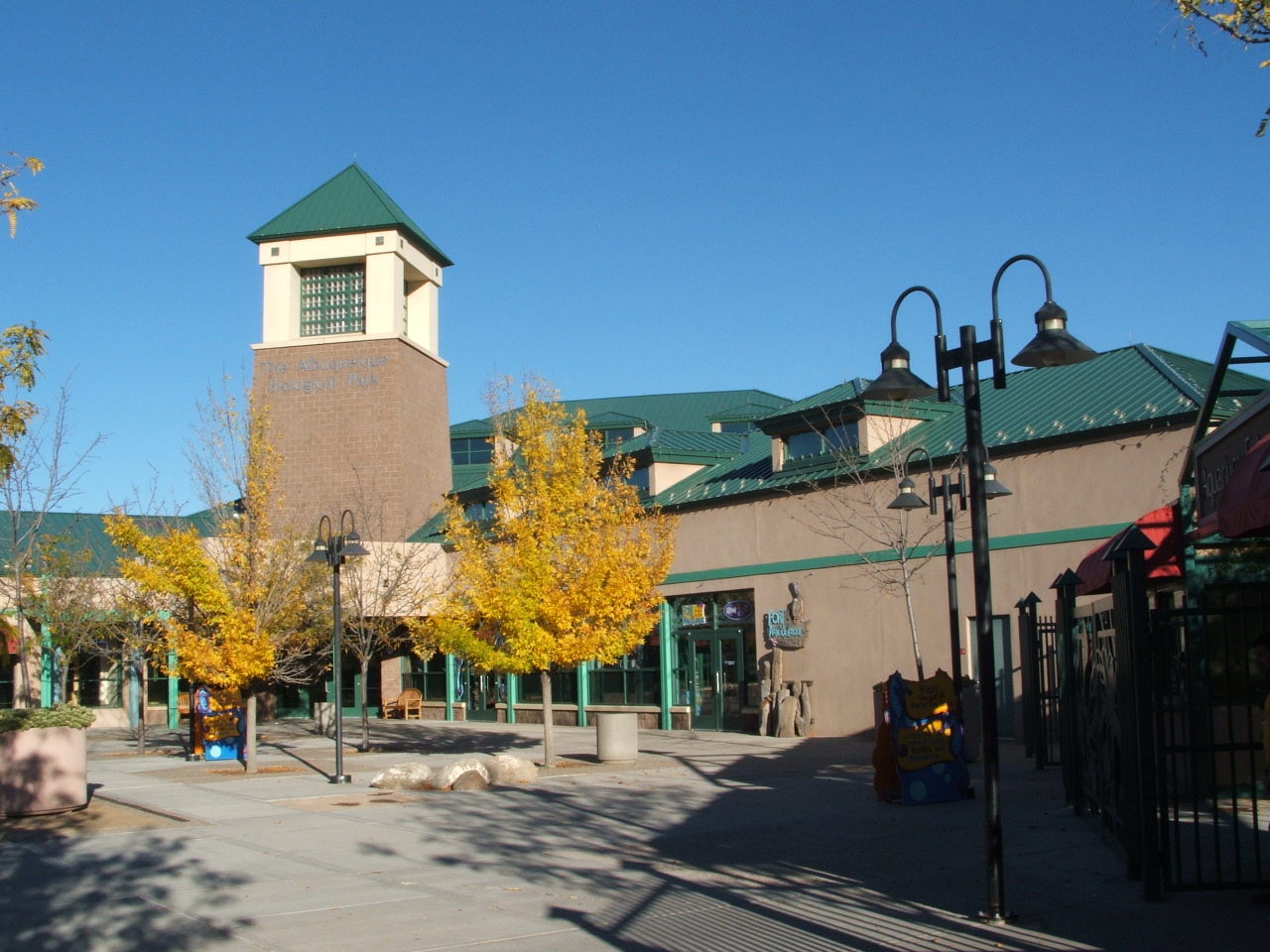
- The ABQ BioPark Aquarium building
- Interactive map of ABQ BioPark Aquarium
- 35.0932°N 106.6790°W
- Date opened: 5 December 1996
- Location: Albuquerque Biological Park, Albuquerque, New Mexico, United States
- Volume of largest tank: 285,000 U.S. gallons (1,080,000 L)
- Memberships: AZA
- Website: www.cabq.gov/biopark/aquarium

The ABQ BioPark Aquarium, located in Albuquerque, New Mexico, United States is a facility of the Albuquerque Biological Park and is located next door to the ABQ BioPark Botanic Garden. The ABQ BioPark Aquarium exhibits Gulf of Mexico and South Pacific saltwater species from a variety of habitats, including surf zone, shallow waters, coral reefs, open ocean and deep ocean. The highlight of the aquarium is a 285,000 U.S. gal (1,080,000 L) shark tank with a 38-foot (12 m)-wide, 9-foot (2.7 m)-high, 8-inch (200 mm)-thick acrylic viewing window.

The South Pacific Gallery features seahorses, pipefishes, and colorfully patterned reef fish. The Rio Grande at Central Bridge exhibit in the aquarium lobby offers visitors an opportunity to compare the kinds of fish that lived in the Albuquerque reach of the Rio Grande 100 years ago and those found today. The Shark/Ray Encounter allows guests to have a guided, up-close experience with bamboo sharks and stingrays. The Albuquerque Biological Park is an accredited member of the Association of Zoos and Aquariums (AZA).

== Exhibits ==
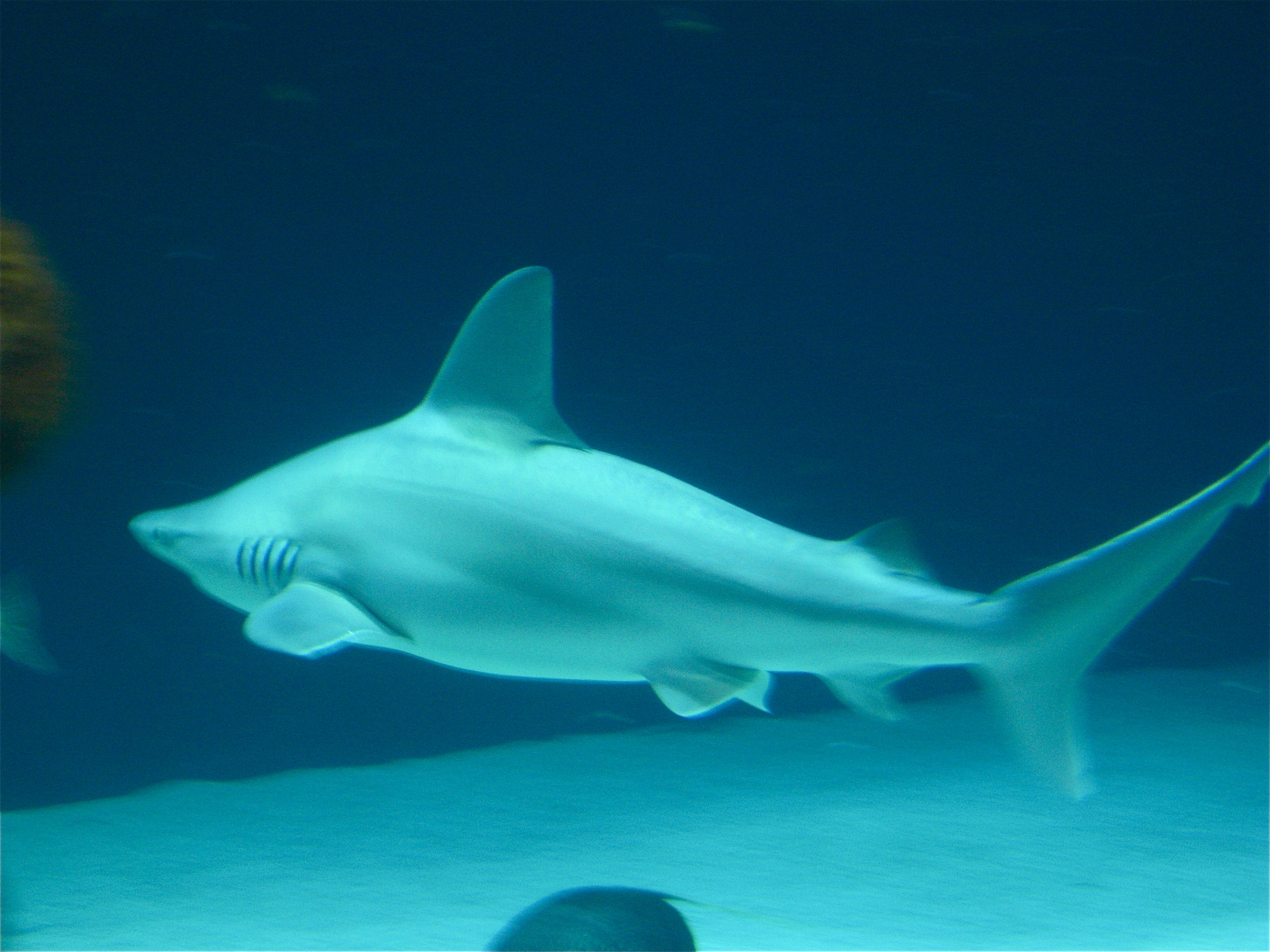
Sandbar shark (Carcharhinus plumbeus)

The ABQ BioPark Aquarium was built as a themed aquarium, with visitors starting at a fountain that depicts the headwaters of the Rio Grande and ending at a 285,000-U.S.-gallon (1,080,000 L) saltwater tank which holds species from the open ocean of the Gulf of Mexico.

After entering the museum, visitors first view freshwater tanks that display fish from the Rio Grande, both currently found and those no longer found in the river today. Adjacent is a small movie theater displaying informational films on aquatic life. Following this is a Gulf of Mexico Coast Gallery, which contains several exhibits depicting the shores of the Gulf of Mexico, with fish and bird species from this region as well as stingrays, and a Texas Terrapin exhibit, and a retired shrimp fishing boat.

In July 2018, the aquarium expanded with the addition of a large North American River Otter exhibit. facility houses 3 otters, females Chaos and Mayhem and a male Dixon. The exhibit is multilayered with an upper-level with land, hiding areas, and plenty of dirt and vegetation with view of the large pool. The large pool includes an underwater viewing tank. Around the viewing tank are smaller tanks that include local fish such as blue gill and catfish, terrariums with local amphibians like leopard frogs and bullfrogs, and invertebrates such as crayfish.

A replica of a coral reef displaying such fish as parrotfish, angelfish, grunts, porcupinefish, and triggerfish comes next; followed by a coral reef tunnel exhibiting several types of fish species found in the South Pacific. The next exhibit is a series of small tanks exhibiting "oddities" such as clownfish, seahorses, pipefish, jellyfish, hagfish, cuttlefish, and nautilus. On occasion, there will also be a touch pool tank open that contains stingrays and bamboo shark pups.

Video of maintenance work in the aquarium.

In 2020, the aquarium added a new exhibit for frog fish. The coral exhibit also went over a large expansion, transforming the small 200-gallon tank into a 1,500-gallon one. The aquarium is home to 50 coral species.

The final exhibit, a 285,000-U.S.-gallon (1,080,000 L) saltwater tank with a 38-foot (12 m) viewing window, displays five shark species (sandtiger sharks, sandbar sharks, nurse sharks, zebra sharks and tasselled wobbegongs), tarpon, barracudas, stingrays, large schooling fish, moray eels and three species of sea turtles (loggerhead, Kemp's ridley, and hawksbill). Every day divers enter the tank to do daily chores like feeding and cleaning.

A restaurant and a gift shop are also located in the building.

== Conservation ==
The ABQ BioPark Aquarium currently runs a facility that focuses in the conservation of fishes found in the Rio Grande. The project includes the Rio Grande silvery minnow breeding program and the Socorro isopod. In January 2008, three blacktip shark pups were born at the Albuquerque Aquarium, making it the first birth of this species of shark ever recorded in captivity. The births were caught on video, which is available for viewing.

The stated mission of the aquarium is to educate the public about the world oceans and the animals that live within. Events are held year round and include monthly sleepovers, a "Shark Week", camps for children during the summer and spring, and celebrations for World Oceans Day, and Earth Day.

== Future Exhibits ==
An updated aquarium entrance is in the new master plans for the aquarium. A recent bond was passed to help bring in a North American Otter exhibit towards the existing Pelican pond. Other new plans include updated local fish exhibits.

== Formerly displayed ==
- A model boat exhibition hall was found in the Aquarium. It has closed and will serve as a location needed for the Otter Exhibit.
- The terrapin exhibit housed baby American alligators before terrapins, and fishes before alligators.
- The fish of the South Pacific walk-through acrylic tunnel formerly housed Moray eels along with other eel species.
