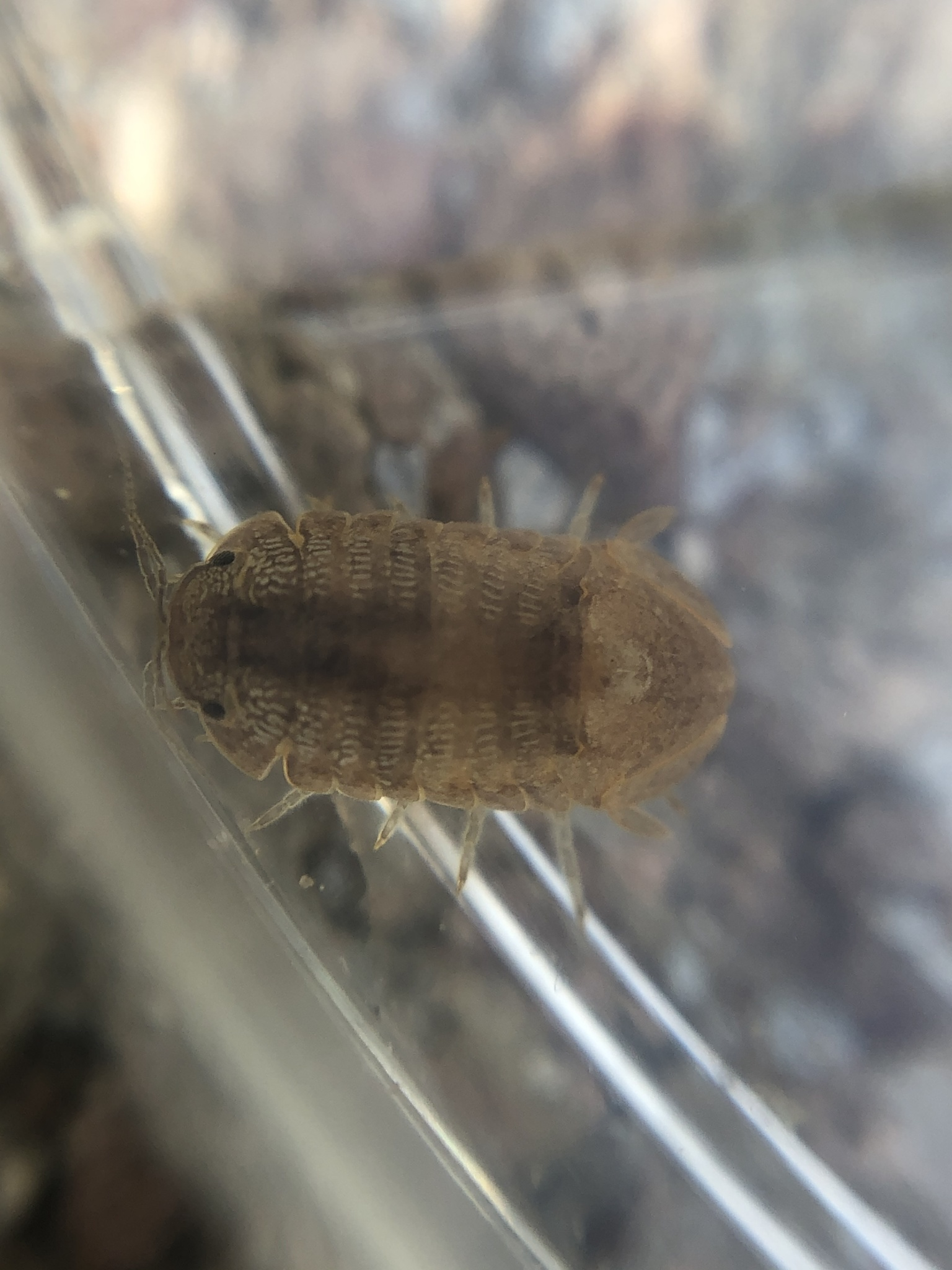

Conservation status
- Extinct in the Wild (IUCN 3.1)

- Endangered (ESA)

Scientific classification
- Kingdom: Animalia
- Phylum: Arthropoda
- Clade: Pancrustacea
- Class: Malacostraca
- Order: Isopoda
- Family: Sphaeromatidae
- Genus: Thermosphaeroma
- Species: T. thermophilum

Binomial name
- Thermosphaeroma thermophilum Richardson, 1897

Synonyms
- Sphaeroma thermophilum Richardson, 1897; Exosphaeroma thermophilum Richardson, 1905; Exosphaeroma termophilum Rioja, 1951

= Thermosphaeroma thermophilum =

Species of crustacean

Thermosphaeroma thermophilum is a crustacean in the family Sphaeromatidae. It is commonly known as the Socorro isopod or Socorro sowbug. It was endemic to the thermal water of Sedillo Spring, located in Socorro County, New Mexico.

Harriet Richardson first described the Socorro isopod in 1897. As of 2006, it resides in captive populations at the Socorro Isopod Propagation Facility (SIPF), Albuquerque Biological Park (ABP), the Minnesota Zoo, the New Mexico Department of Game and Fish Laboratory in Santa Fe, and by the Department of Biology at New Mexico Tech. It was reintroduced following a near-extinction incident in 1988. The wild population became extinct when a tree root burst the pipe and cut off water flow to the concrete pools.

== Description ==
The body size of the Socorro isopod is sexually dimorphic, varying noticeably depending on gender. Males tend to reach 7.1 millimeters in length on average (4-13 millimeter range). Meanwhile, females tend to reach 5.1 millimeters in length on average (4.5-6 millimeter range). Both sexes are gray to reddish-brown in color, with the edges of their bodies being tinted bright orange. Their body is flattened and segmented, with the last body segment possessing uropods. They have seven pairs of legs and a pair of antennae on their head.

== Life history ==
The Socorro isopod has a lifespan of 1 year. During the timespan between March and October, the mean body size for both males and females increases. It then rapidly decreases from October to February. They reach sexual maturity between 4–11 weeks, with males maturing faster than females. Some females won't sexually mature at all because they will reabsorb their ovaries; the reason this might happen is unknown. Females are iteroparous and are capable of reproducing multiple times throughout their lives. Given adequate food and proper temperature conditions they can give birth every two months. They are receptive to mating during their molting process. They store sperm at this time to use it later when they ovulate. Their ovaries will mature after mating, an adaptation that evolved in response to male isopods being very aggressive during mating. Females will carry their offspring for about 30 days, after which they will give birth to between 3 and 57 offspring under laboratory conditions, with an average of 16 offspring. After giving birth, their ovaries will need about 30 days to recover before they can mate again. Their brood is skewed towards males. Sometimes pregnant females won't give birth because they reabsorb their unborn offspring. April sees the largest number of pregnant females before declining to a minimum number around late summer.

== Ecology ==
=== Diet ===
The Socorro isopod is omnivorous, eating both plant material and other aquatic invertebrates. They feed on blue-green algae and leaves or detritus from cottonwood. They also eat juniper, or mesquite trees, and dragonfly nymphs. A large part of their diet is also made up by cannibalism. Healthy and uninjured isopods are sometimes cannibalized by larger individuals. Victims of cannibalism are always smaller than their attackers. The individuals that are either injured or dying are often eaten by other isopods. This cannibalistic behavior helps to structure the population demographics of the species. Aside from cannibalism, the Socorro isopod appears to lack any natural predators. The water is too deep (15–26 cm) for birds to reach them. They eat other carnivorous invertebrates themselves.

=== Reproduction ===
To determine if mating is worthwhile, male isopods engage in mate-guarding behavior. There are four main forms of mate guarding behavior: encounter, assessment, rejection, and guarding. During encounter, the male acknowledges a female but does not attempt to guard her. During assessment, the male grabs onto a female and moves his legs across her body for less than 15 seconds. Males will assess females on their backs by lifting them up with their legs. This allows them to better determine female body size. During rejection, a male will grab a female for longer than 15 seconds, but less than 5 minutes. During guarding, a male grabs onto a female for longer than 5 minutes. Both isopod genders attempt to mate with large-bodied members of the opposite sex. For females, a large-bodied male is more likely to pass his survival genes on to offspring. This could help females to increase reproductive success, making large males more attractive. Mate-guarding can inhibit female fecundity, so females have evolved counter-adaptations against male mate-guarding. These include resistance against guarding, hiding from suitors, and sperm storage.

=== Habitat ===
The Socorro isopod lives in warm aquatic habitats. They like environmental temperatures ranging from 26–33 °C (79–91 °F). They are endemic to the thermal waters of Socorro Spring in Socorro County in New Mexico, United States. The smaller juveniles and adult females are commonly found residing on vegetation. This serves as a hiding place from the larger males that could cannibalize them. Meanwhile, adult males are commonly found living directly on the bottom sediments. They often burrow beneath the substrate during the day and emerge again later on at dusk.

=== Range ===
The Socorro isopod was formerly endemic to the Sedillo Spring near Socorro County, New Mexico, USA. In 1947, the spring waters were diverted to provide the city of Socorro with drinking water. This forced the isopods to only live in a single old water pipeline in the city. In 1988, a tree root caused the pipeline to burst, resulting in the extinction of the wild population. The only surviving isopods were from captive communities. These have since been reintroduced back into the pipeline, where a wild population still resides today. There are also captive populations in the SIPF, ABP, the Minnesota Zoo, the New Mexico Department of Game and Fish Laboratory in Santa Fe, and the Department of Biology at New Mexico Tech.

== Conservation ==
=== Population size ===
The historical population size of the Socorro isopod is unknown. Their current population size of the wild population is about 2,500 isopods. The ABP also houses 300 individuals in 5 large tanks that continually reproduce and are self-sustaining.

=== Past and current geographical distribution ===
The Socorro isopod used to be endemic to the Sedillo Spring near Socorro County, New Mexico, USA. It now resides on a pipeline constructed in 1947 to provide the city with water. There are also various captive populations residing in the SIPF, ABP, the Minnesota Zoo, the New Mexico Department of Game and Fish (NMDGF) Laboratory in Santa Fe, and the Department of Biology at New Mexico Tech. The city of Socorro, in collaboration with the United States Fish and Wildlife Service (USFWS) and the NMDGF, constructed the SIPF. This artificial habitat was constructed near the isopod's native habitat. It attempts to best replicate its natural environmental conditions. It consists of 8 artificial pools connected by pipes. Controlled propagation of isopods began at the facility in 1990. 600 isopods were introduced to the facility, with 75 isopods per pool.

=== Major threats ===
The main threat to the Socorro isopod is disruption of thermal groundwater discharge. This disruption results from woody root growth, surface mining, explosive tests on nearby Department of Defense lands, and human vandalism. Vandalism in particular has become a worsening threat to the species. From 1995 to 2002, this vandalism included damaging, diverting or blocking the spring's water flow, removal of vegetation, destruction of protective concrete walls around the spring, and pollution from the abandonment of a junk car near the spring.

=== Listing under the ESA ===
The IUCN Red List lists the Socorro isopod as extinct in the wild (EW). This listing is likely out of date since the isopod was last assessed on August 1, 1996. Based on the five-year review from the USFWS the isopod is likely Vulnerable (VU). It was the first crustacean ever listed on the endangered species list.

=== Five-year review ===
The Socorro isopod was native to a spring in Socorro, New Mexico. This spring was converted to a bathhouse in the early 1900s. Some isopods still live in the bathhouse remains, but the natural habitat no longer exists. Little is known about the conditions in which the isopod evolved. In 1988, a drought destroyed the wild population, but a captive population at the University of New Mexico was present and was reintroduced to the bathhouse. To protect against future drought harming the isopod, water was diverted to the SIPF outside the city. ABP also houses 300 individuals in 5 large tanks that continually reproduce and are self-sustaining.

=== Species status assessment ===
Not available at this point.

=== Recovery plan ===
The Socorro isopod is currently protected by the USFWS. Permits are being issued to protect this species. A recovery plan was even written and approved in 1982, before they became extinct in the wild. Captive populations have been established to secure the future of the isopod. They are held in the SIPF, which was constructed as a collaboration between the city of Socorro, the USFWS, and the New Mexico Department of Game and Fish. This is an artificial habitat constructed outside the isopod's native habitat in order to best replicate its natural environmental conditions. Controlled propagation of isopods began at the facility in 1990. Further captive populations are present in the ABP, New Mexico Tech, and the New Mexico Department of Game and Fish laboratory.
