= Big Jim pepper =

Cultivar of New Mexico chile pepper

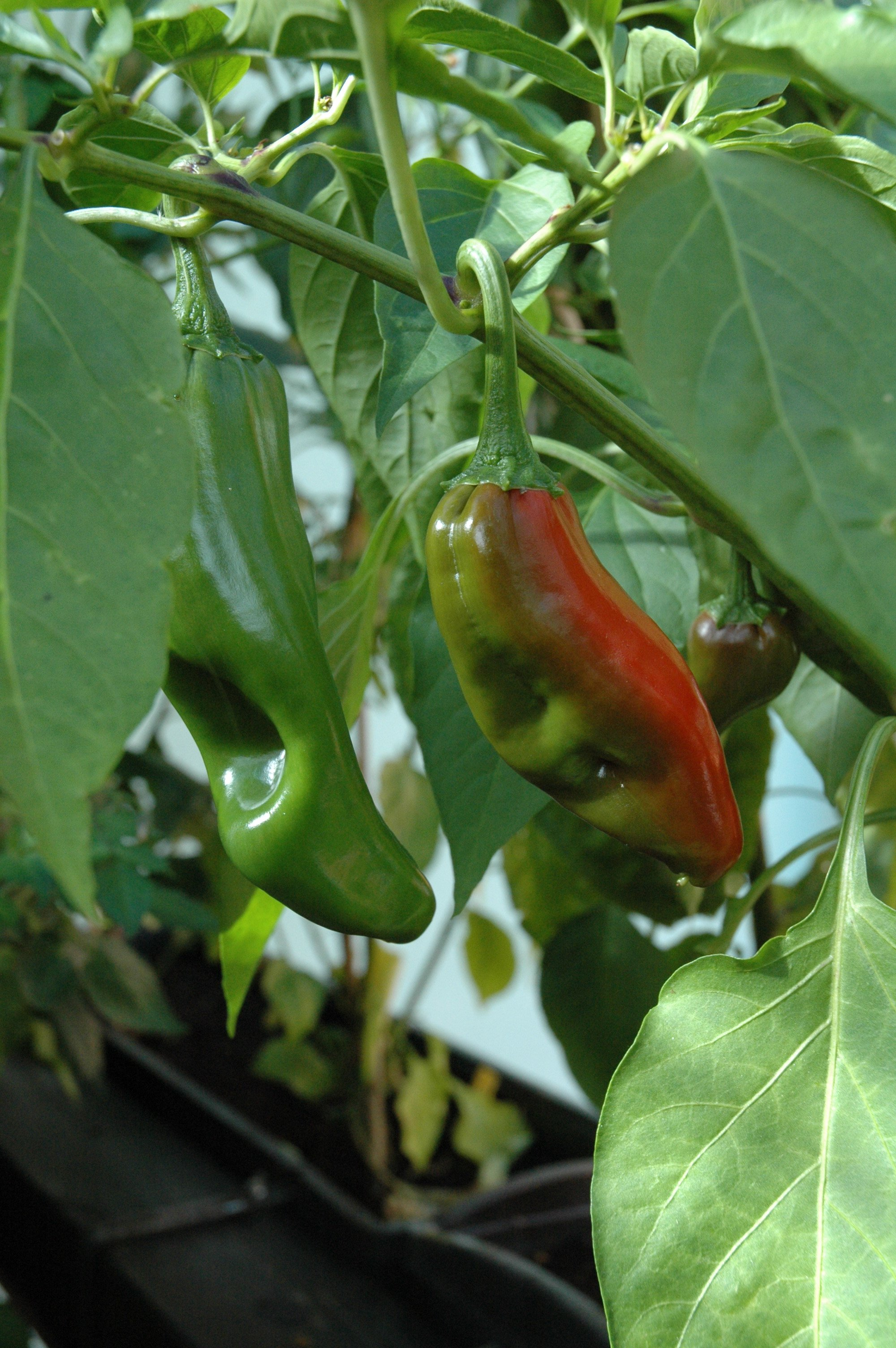
- Species: Capsicum annuum
- Cultivar group: New Mexico chile
- Origin: United States
- Heat: Low
- Scoville scale: 500–3,000 SHU

The Big Jim pepper, officially the NuMex Big Jim, is a New Mexico chile pepper cultivar of the species Capsicum annuum with a Scoville rating of mild. This cultivar is extensively grown in the US state of New Mexico where it was developed and is popular in New Mexican cuisine. Big Jim peppers are both sweet and mild and are normally picked while still green. The fruits are large and thick walled, often exceeding over a foot in length, and they are almost exclusively used to produce roasted green chile in New Mexican cuisine.

== History ==
The Big Jim pepper cultivar was developed at New Mexico State University by Dr. Roy Nakayama, a son of Japanese immigrants and a man who had once been denied entry into NMSU because of his ethnicity.

The Big Jim is a hybrid of New Mexican chilies and a Peruvian pepper that was developed at New Mexico State University by Dr. Nakayama in 1975 in cooperation with Jim Lytle, the person for whom this chile pepper is named. The Big Jim was both larger and hotter than the popular New Mexico chiles of the time, offering larger and cheaper harvests at a time when demand for chili peppers was increasing.

The Big Jim chile formerly held the Guinness Book of World Records record as the largest chile pepper in the world, with individual fruits routinely exceeding 14 inches in length. The peppers are mild when still green, but become spicier as they ripen to red. They are rarely used as in their ripe form, and are used almost exclusively to produce green chile. In common with most New Mexico chile cultivars, Big Jim chiles are somewhat variable in their fruiting, and produce individual peppers of varying heat, with most of the peppers being very mild (500 SHU), and an occasional medium pepper (3,000 SHU).

== NuMex Heritage Big Jim ==
In 1977, seeds of the Big Jim chile were deposited in the National Plant Germplasm System for cryogenic storage. Two decades later, motivated by complaints that modern chilies lacked the traditional New Mexico chile flavor, a heritage variety was developed from the cryogenically frozen Big Jim chile seeds. 200 seeds were retrieved in 1998 and cultivated to produce a variety dubbed the 'NuMex Heritage Big Jim'. In 2013, a research report indicated that the heritage variety is approximately 45% hotter, possesses a traditional New Mexico green chile flavor, and offers higher yield and fruit length than the standard commercially available Big Jim chile.

== See also ==
- Chimayó pepper
- Fresno chile
- New Mexico No. 9
- Santa Fe Grande
- Sandia chile
- New Mexico chile
- List of Capsicum cultivars
