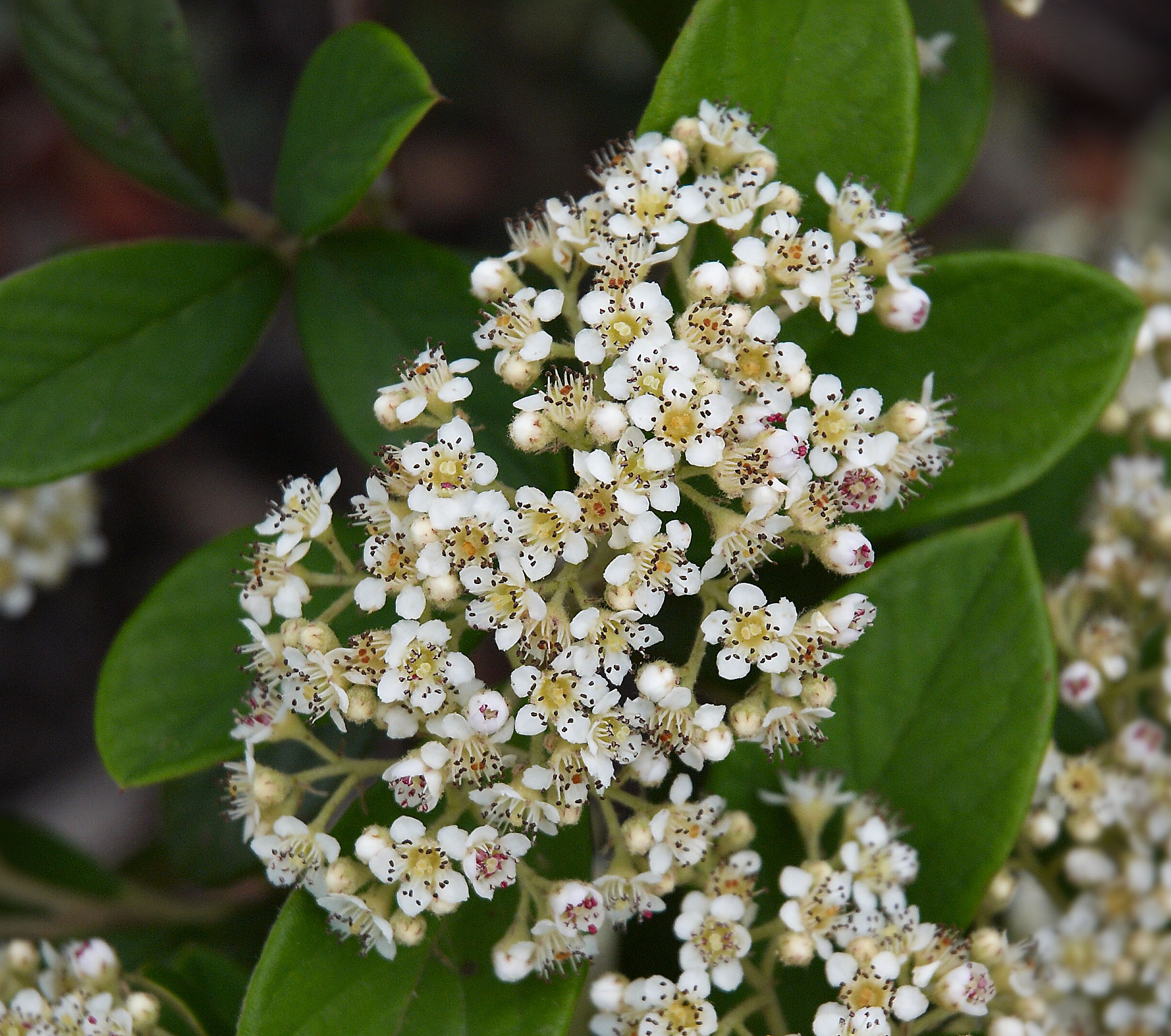
- C. coriaceus flowers
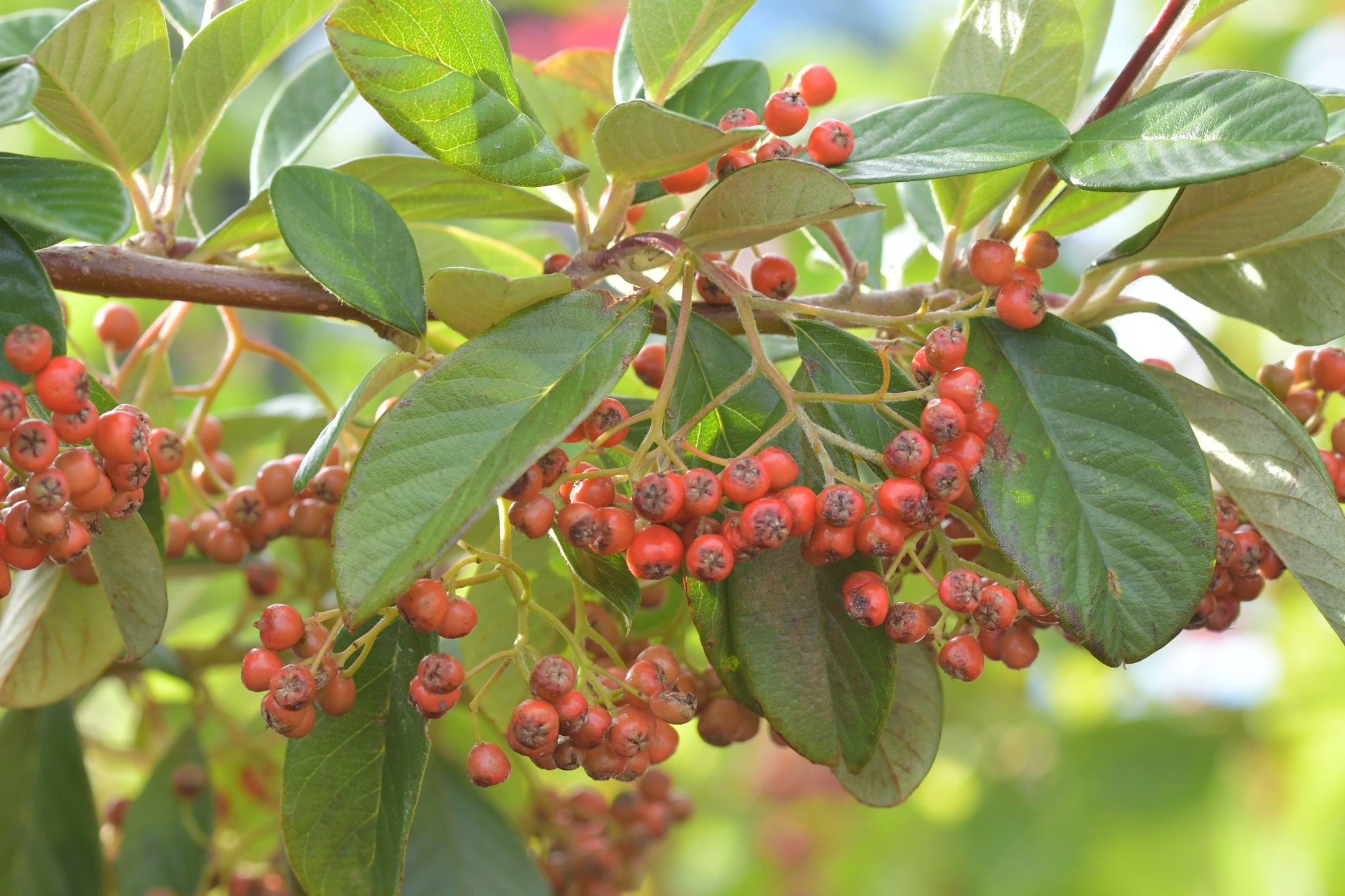
- Fruit

Scientific classification
- Kingdom: Plantae
- Clade: Tracheophytes
- Clade: Angiosperms
- Clade: Eudicots
- Clade: Rosids
- Order: Rosales
- Family: Rosaceae
- Genus: Cotoneaster
- Species: C. coriaceus

Binomial name
- Cotoneaster coriaceus Franch.

Synonyms
- Cotoneaster lacteus W.W.Sm.; Cotoneaster oligocarpus C.K.Schneid.; Cotoneaster smithii G.Klotz; Pyrus coriacea (Franch.) M.F.Fay & Christenh.; Pyrus lactea (W.W.Sm.) M.F.Fay & Christenh.; Pyrus smithii (G.Klotz) M.F.Fay & Christenh.

= Cotoneaster coriaceus =

Species of flowering plant

Cotoneaster coriaceus (syn. Cotoneaster lacteus), the late cotoneaster or milkflower cotoneaster, is a species of flowering plant in the family Rosaceae, native to Tibet and south-central China. It is a large evergreen shrub growing to 4 m (13 ft) tall and wide. Clusters of white flowers are followed by masses of small, globose, red fruits (pomes) in autumn. Unusually for this genus, the fruits are avoided by birds, hence garden escapes are rare, and the fruit persists on the plant throughout the winter.

The Latin specific epithet lacteus refers to the milk-white flowers, and coriaceus refers to its leathery leaves.

Cotoneaster coriaceus may be grown as a hedge. It has gained the Royal Horticultural Society's Award of Garden Merit.

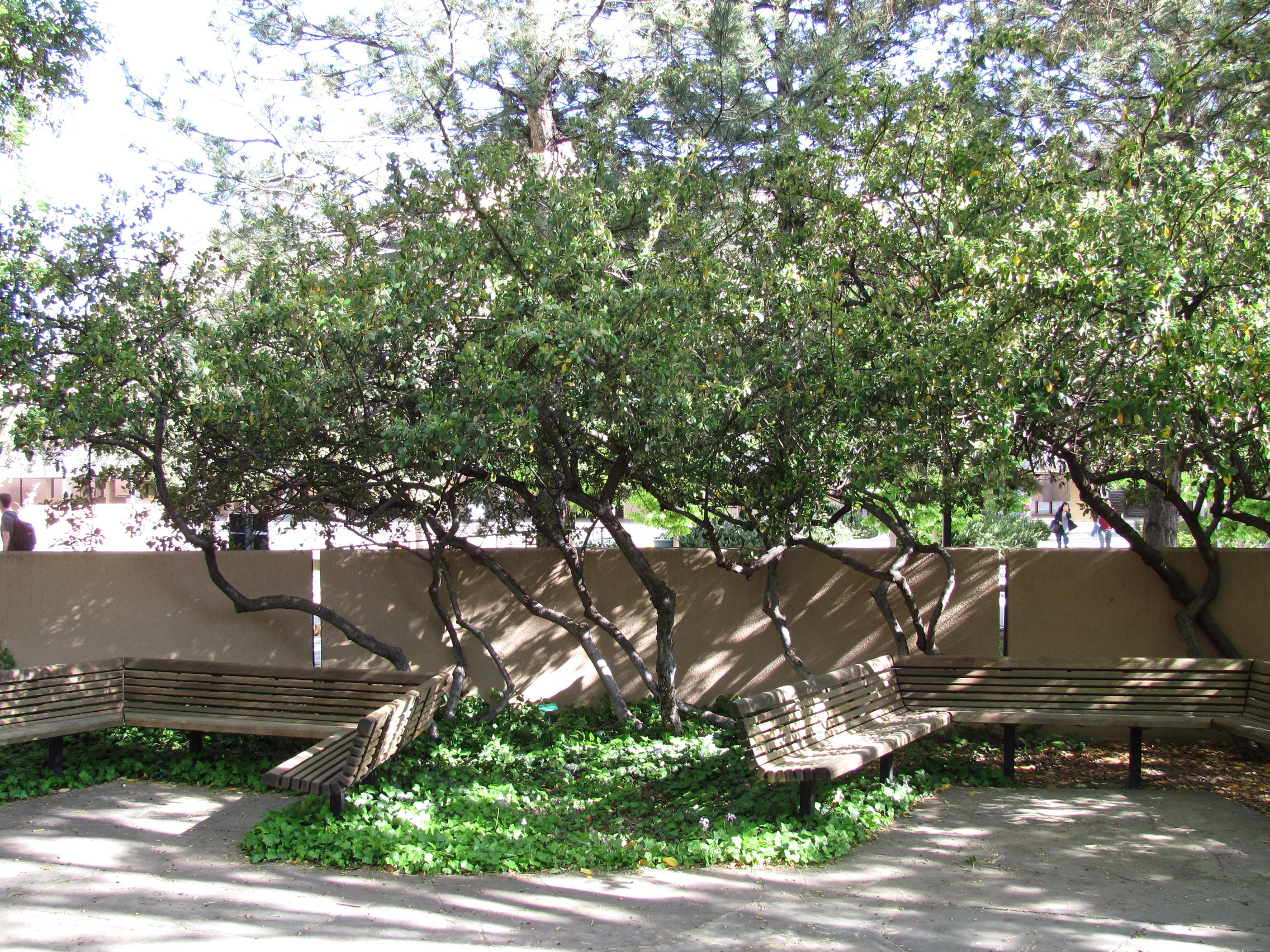
C. coriaceus plants, UNM Arboretum
