= Harriet Richardson =

American carcinologist (1874–1958)

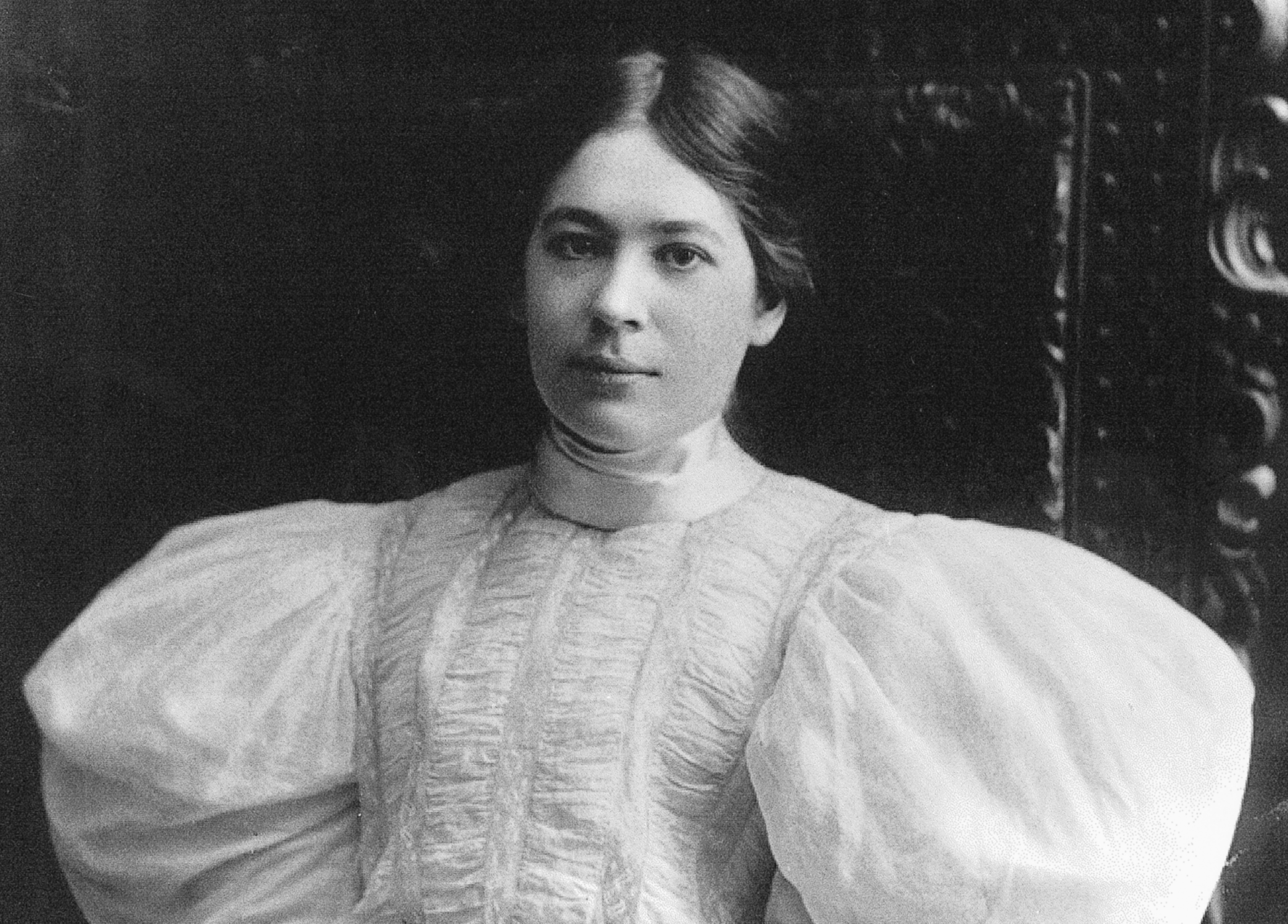
- Born: May 8, 1874; Washington, D.C., US
- Died: March 28, 1958 (aged 83); Hahnemann University Hospital
- Resting place: Arlington National Cemetery; 38.873576°N 77.074872°W
- Other name: Harriet Richardson Searle
- Education: Vassar College; George Washington University
- Known for: isopod systematics
- Spouse: William Daniel Searle
- Children: William Richardson Searle
- Scientific career
- Fields: Invertebrate Zoology
- Workplaces: National Museum of Natural History
- Thesis: Contributions to the Natural History of the Isopoda (1904)
- Academic advisors: Theodore Nicholas Gill

Harriet Richardson Searle (May 9, 1874 – March 28, 1958) was an American carcinologist. She was known as the first lady of isopods and was one of the first female carcinologists, with only Mary Jane Rathbun before her.

== Biography ==
Richardson was born on May 9, 1874, in Washington, D.C., to Charles and Charlotte Ann Richardson. She attended the Friends School and Mount Vernon Seminary in Washington before attending Vassar College - where she became interested in biology - from which she graduated in 1896 with an A.B., and again with a master's degree in zoology in 1901.

In 1901 Richardson was appointed Collaborator in the Division of Marine Invertebrates at the National Museum of Natural History. She earned her PhD in the same field from Columbian University (now George Washington University) in 1903. Richardson began working with the Smithsonian in 1896. She worked at the museum unpaid by the Smithsonian for about twenty years. During this time she produced more output than many that were paid for a lifetime of research.

Richardson married William Searle, a lawyer, on December 10, 1913, with whom she had one child, named William, on September 5, 1914. Her son had a mental or physical handicap, resulting in a large amount of her time being spent looking after him. Richardson died at Hahnemann University Hospital on March 28, 1958. Her husband died shortly after. In 1972, their son, William Richardson Searle, was buried with them at Arlington National Cemetery.

Outside of her work on isopods, Richardson was the President of the Vassar College Club of Washington, D.C. from 1911–1912 and she was a charter member of the Captain Molly Pitcher Chapter, Daughters of the American Revolution, going on to be a Historian, Treasurer, Vice-Regent, and then Regent from 1914–1915. She was a member of the Biological Society of Washington, the Washington Academy of Sciences, and the Washington Society of Fine Arts.

== Research ==
Richardson focused on research on isopod (and tanaid) systematics, and began publishing papers on isopoda in 1897; her first study was on the Socorro Isopod and she went on to publish a total of 80 papers. Her best known work was A Monograph on the Isopods of North America, published in the Bulletin of the U.S. National Museum in 1905. This work covered all terrestrial, freshwater, and marine isopods in North America with keys, references, and descriptions. This work was reprinted in 1972, meaning it has had a lasting impact on the field. She wrote reports in foreign publications, including materials from the National Museum of Natural History, Paris and the Rothschild collections from East Africa. Richardson wrote some of her papers in French.

Over the course of her career Richardson described over 70 new genera and nearly 300 new species of isopods and tanaids, many of which she named after colleagues or those who gifted collections to her. In turn the isopod species Caecidotea richardsonae and harpacticoida copepod genus Harrietella, among many others, are named after her.

After the birth of her son Richardson had to spend a large amount of time caring for him and thus spent less time on her research, publishing papers only occasionally, with her last in 1922. Before December 1952, 6 years before her death, the museum changed her title to Research Associate instead of Collaborator.

== Honors ==
Richardson has the isopod genus Harrieta Kensley, 1987 and the harpacticoid gunus Harrietella T. Scott, 1906 named for her, as well as many species of marine isopods.

List of species named after Harriet Richardson:

- Dactylokepon richardsonae Stebbing, 1910
- Parabopyrella richardsonae (Nierstrasz & Brender á Brandis, 1929)
- Parapenaeon richardsonae (Nierstrasz & Brender á Brandis, 1931)
- Parionella richardsonae Nierstrasz & Brender á Brandis, 1923
- Rocinela richardsonae Nierstrasz, 1931
- Renocila richardsonae Williams & Bunkley-Williams, 1992
- Amesopous richardsonae Stebbing, 1905
- Neastacilla richardsonae Kussakin, 1982
- Munneurycope harrietae Wolff, 1962
- Carpias harrietae Pires, 1981
- Cymodoce richardsoniae Nobili, 1906
- Littorophiloscia richardsonae (Holmes and Gay, 1909)
- Caecidotea richardsonae Hay, 1901
- Lirceus richardsonae Hubricht & Mackin, 1949
- Possibly: Pseudidothea richardsoni Hurley, 1957

== Select publications ==
- H Richardson. 1905. A monograph on the isopods of North America.- Bulletin of the U.S. National Museum 54: i-liii, 1-727. [December.] [Reprinted (1972) Antiquariaat Junk, Lochem, Netherlands.]
- H Richardson. 1904. Contributions to the natural history of the Isopoda.-Proceedings of the U.S. National Museum 27(1350): 1-89. [19 January.]
- H Richardson. 1910. Marine isopods collected in the Philippines by the U.S. Fisheries Steamer “Albatross” in 1907–08.— Bureau of Fisheries Document 736: 1–44.
- H Richardson. 1901. Key to the isopods of the Atlantic coast of North America with descriptions of new and little known species.-Proceedings of the U.S. National Museum 23(1222): 493-579. [28 February.]
- H Richardson. 1909. Isopods collected in the northwest Pacific by the U.S. Bureau of Fisheries Steamer “Albatross” in 1906.—Proceedings of the U.S. National Museum 37(1701): 75–129. [22 October.]
- H Richardson. 1902. The marine and terrestrial isopods of the Bermudas, with descriptions of new genera and species.—Transactions of the Connecticut Academy of Sciences 11(1): 277–310, pls. 37–40.
- H Richardson. 1899. Key to the isopods of the Pacific coast of North America, with descriptions of twenty-two new species.—Proceedings of the U.S. National Museum 21(1175): 815–869. [5 June.] [Reprinted (1899) in Annals and Magazine of Natural History (7) 4(21): 157–187, (22): 260–277, (23): 321–338.]
- H Richardson. 1900. Synopses of North-American invertebrates. VIII. The Isopoda. Part I.-American Naturalist 34(399): 207-230. [March.]
- H Richardson. 1908. Some new Isopoda of the superfamily Aselloidea from the Atlantic coast of North America.— Proceedings of the U.S. National Museum 35(1633): 71–86. [30 October.]
- H Richardson. 1912. Descriptions of a new genus of isopod crustaceans, and of two new species from South America.— Proceedings of the U.S. National Museum 43(1929): 201–204. [27 September.]
