= Albuquerque Biological Park =

Environmental museum in Albuquerque, New Mexico, United States

ABQ BioPark Zoo
- Interactive map of ABQ BioPark Zoo
- 35.0781°N 106.6632°W
- Location: Albuquerque, New Mexico, United States
- Annual visitors: 1.5 million
- Memberships: Association of Zoos and Aquariums
- Website: cabq.gov/biopark

The ABQ BioPark (or Albuquerque Biological Park) is an environmental museum located in Albuquerque, New Mexico. The park contains four separate facilities:

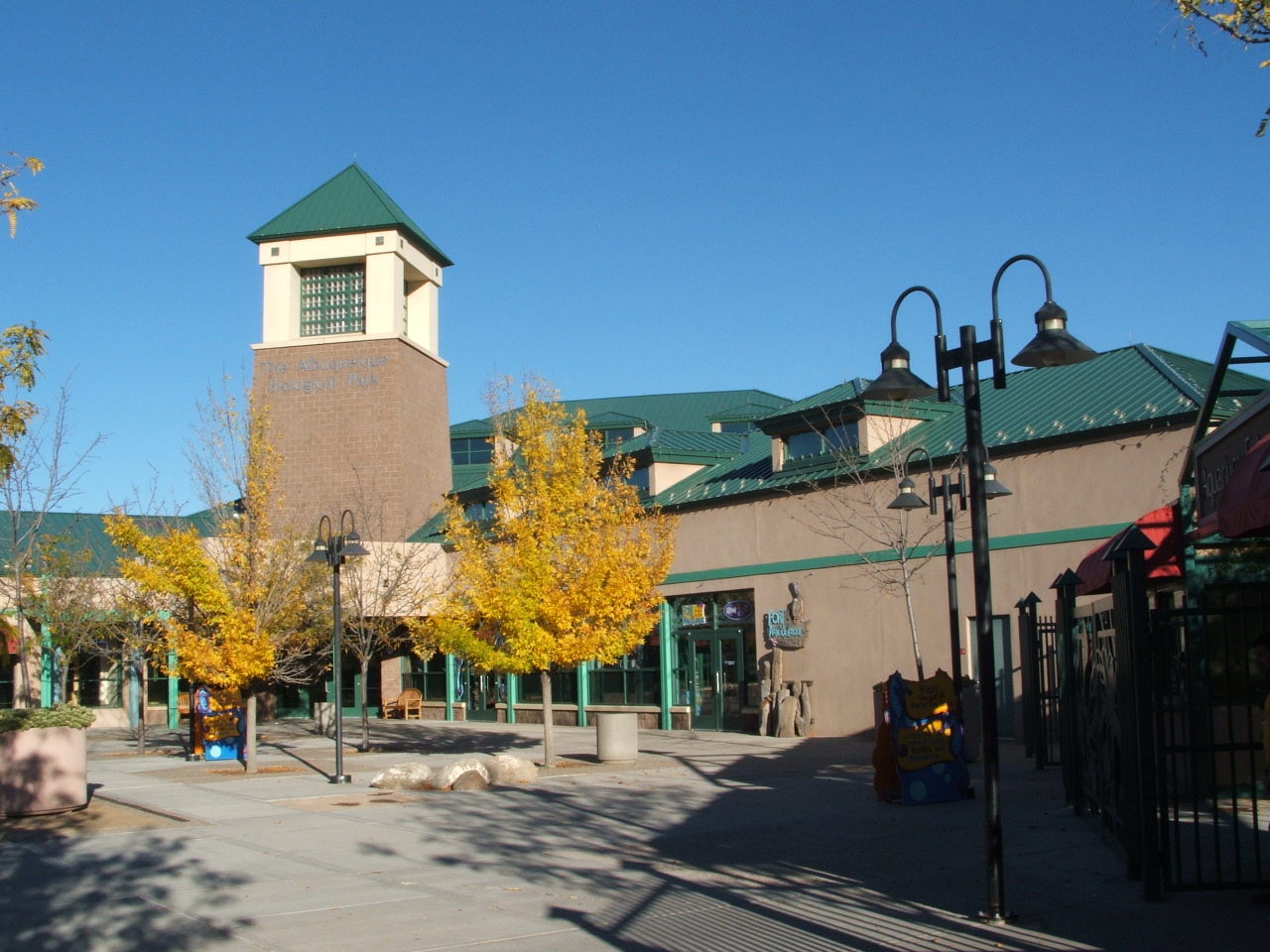
ABQ BioPark Aquarium

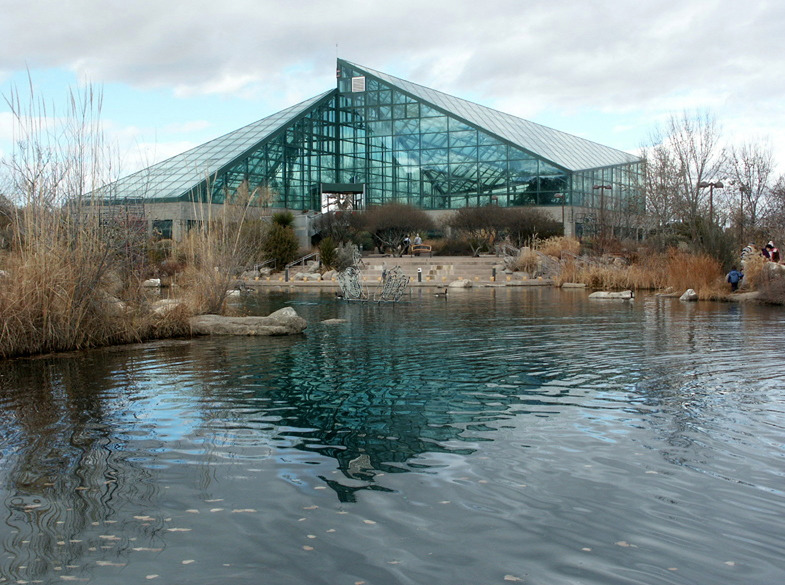
ABQ BioPark Botanic Garden

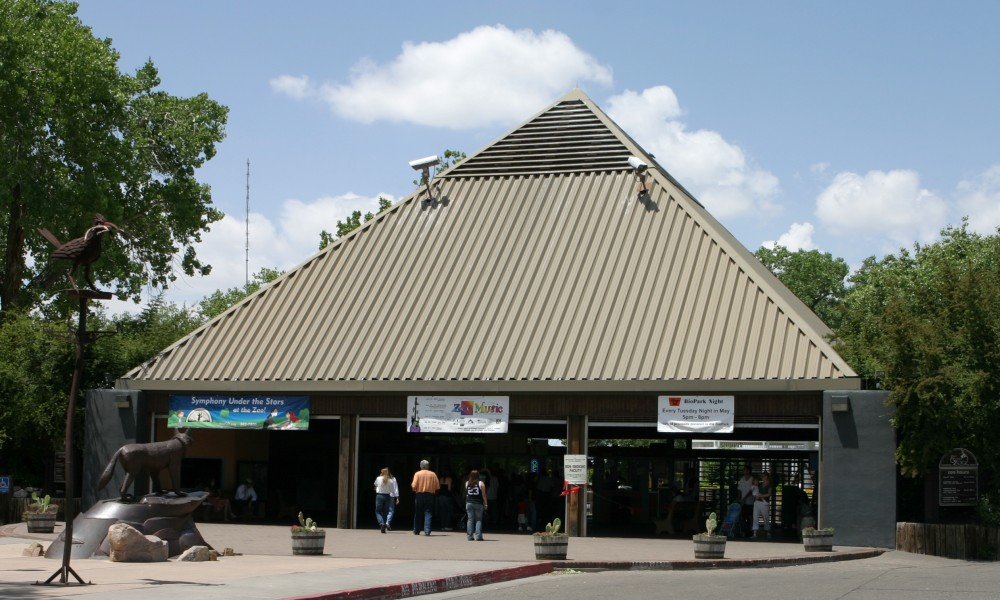
ABQ BioPark Zoo

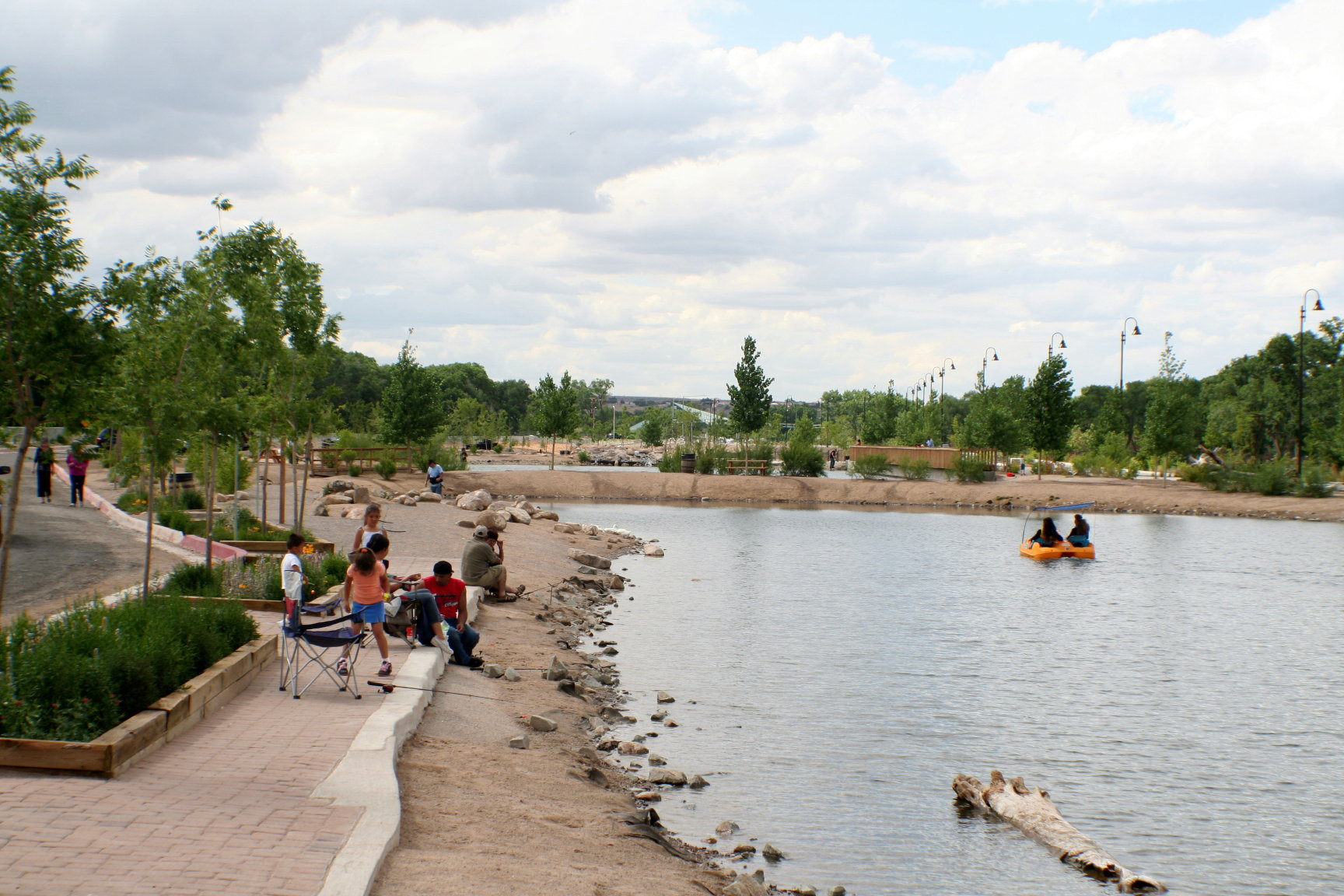
ABQ BioPark Tingley Beach
- ABQ BioPark Aquarium - An aquarium with a 285,000-US-gallon (1,080,000 L) ocean tank containing Gulf of Mexico saltwater species from estuaries, surf zone, shallow waters, coral reefs, and ocean, as well as many other exhibits.
- ABQ BioPark Botanic Garden - A 36-acre (15 ha) botanic garden that includes a 10,000-square-foot (930 m^{2}) glass conservatory housing plants from desert and Mediterranean climate zones.
- ABQ BioPark Zoo - A 64-acre (26 ha) zoo, with 2.5 miles (4.0 km) of paths and more than 250 species of exotic and native animals. Asian elephants, reticulated giraffes, Malayan tigers, snow leopards, polar bears, hippos, gorillas, chimpanzees, Hartmann's mountain zebras, along with more unusual animals such as spotted hyenas, southern white rhinos, Tasmanian devils, wombats and African wild dogs. There is a variety of birds, from storks and eagles to roadrunners.
- Tingley Beach - fishing lake, model boating lake, picnic areas, shuttle bus, and paths.

Collectively the four facilities see about 1.5 million visitors a year. The ABQ BioPark is an accredited member of the Association of Zoos and Aquariums (AZA). City records indicate more than 1,100 animals are in the BioPark's care during the fiscal year (as of December 2016).

== Shuttle ==
The ABQ BioPark operates a shuttle service between the Zoo, Botanic Garden and Aquarium. Formerly they operated a 36" narrow gauge railroad that connected these facilities, but it stopped running due to COVID-19 and was replaced with an electric tram.

== See also ==
- List of botanical gardens in the United States
- List of zoos in the United States
- List of aquariums in the United States
