= University of New Mexico Arboretum =

Arboretum in Albuquerque, New Mexico

Coordinates: 35°5′6″N 106°37′19″W

- Interactive map of University of New Mexico Arboretum

The University of New Mexico Arboretum is a nationally accredited arboretum extending throughout the University of New Mexico campus in Albuquerque, New Mexico. The campus is also an Arbor Day Foundation Tree Campus for Higher Education.

The arboretum contains some 235 species of woody plants.

== Plants included ==
=== Native to New Mexico ===
- Cercis canadensis
- Chilopsis linearis
- Cupressus arizonica
- Forestiera neomexicana
- Fraxinus velutina
- Juniperus deppeana
- Neltuma glandulosa
- Pinus edulis
- Pinus ponderosa
- Populus deltoides wislizeni
- Populus tremuloides
- Sambucus cerulea var. neomexicana
- Strombocarpa pubescens

=== Non-native ===
- Albizia julibrissin
- Buxus microphylla japonica
- Campsis radicans
- Cotoneaster lacteus
- Ficus carica
- Fraxinus pennsylvanica
- Ginkgo biloba
- Gleditsia triacanthos inermis
- Hedera helix
- Juniperus communis
- Juniperus sabina 'Broadmoor'
- Koelreuteria paniculata
- Morus alba 'Pendula'
- Nandina domestica
- Photinia serrulata
- Pinus mugo
- Pinus nigra
- Pinus sylvestris
- Platanus × hispanica
- Poa pratensis
- Populus canadensis 'Eugenii'
- Prunus cerasifera
- Rhaphiolepis indica
- Salix babylonica
- Ulmus pumila
- Ulmus parvifolia
- Vitex agnus-castus.

== Gallery ==
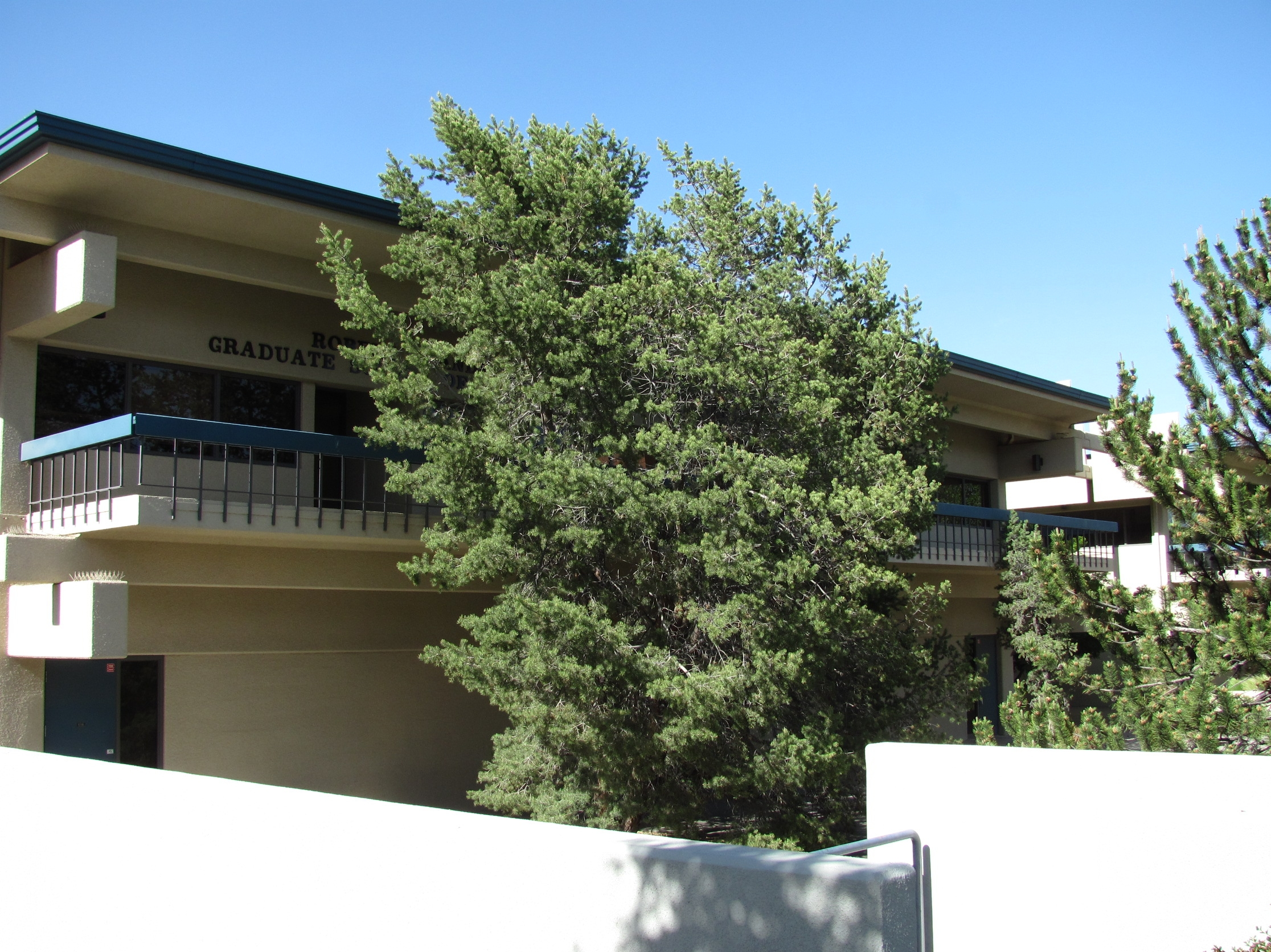
Pinus edulis
Piñon Pine

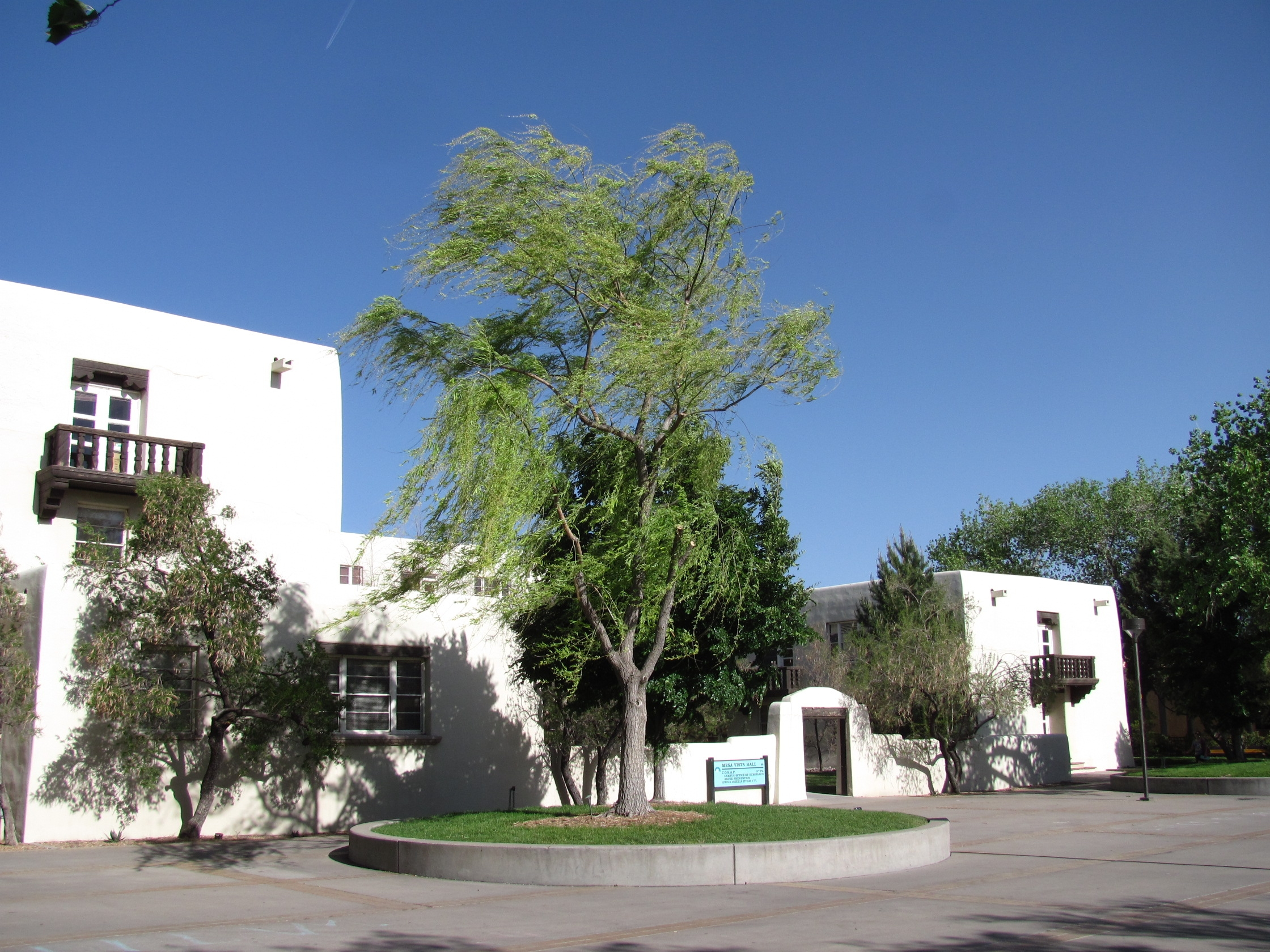
Salix babylonica
Weeping Willow

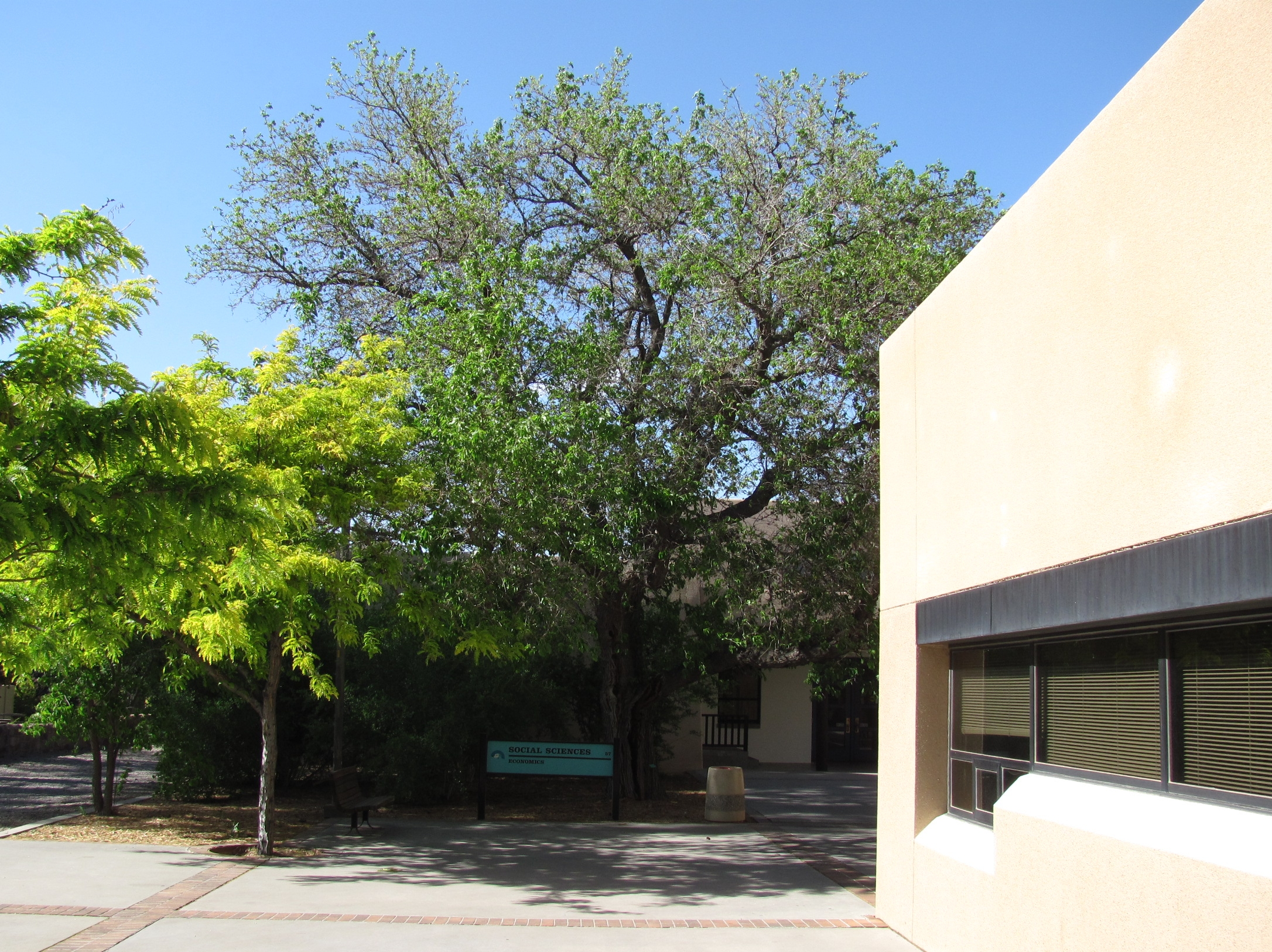
Morus alba
White Mulberry

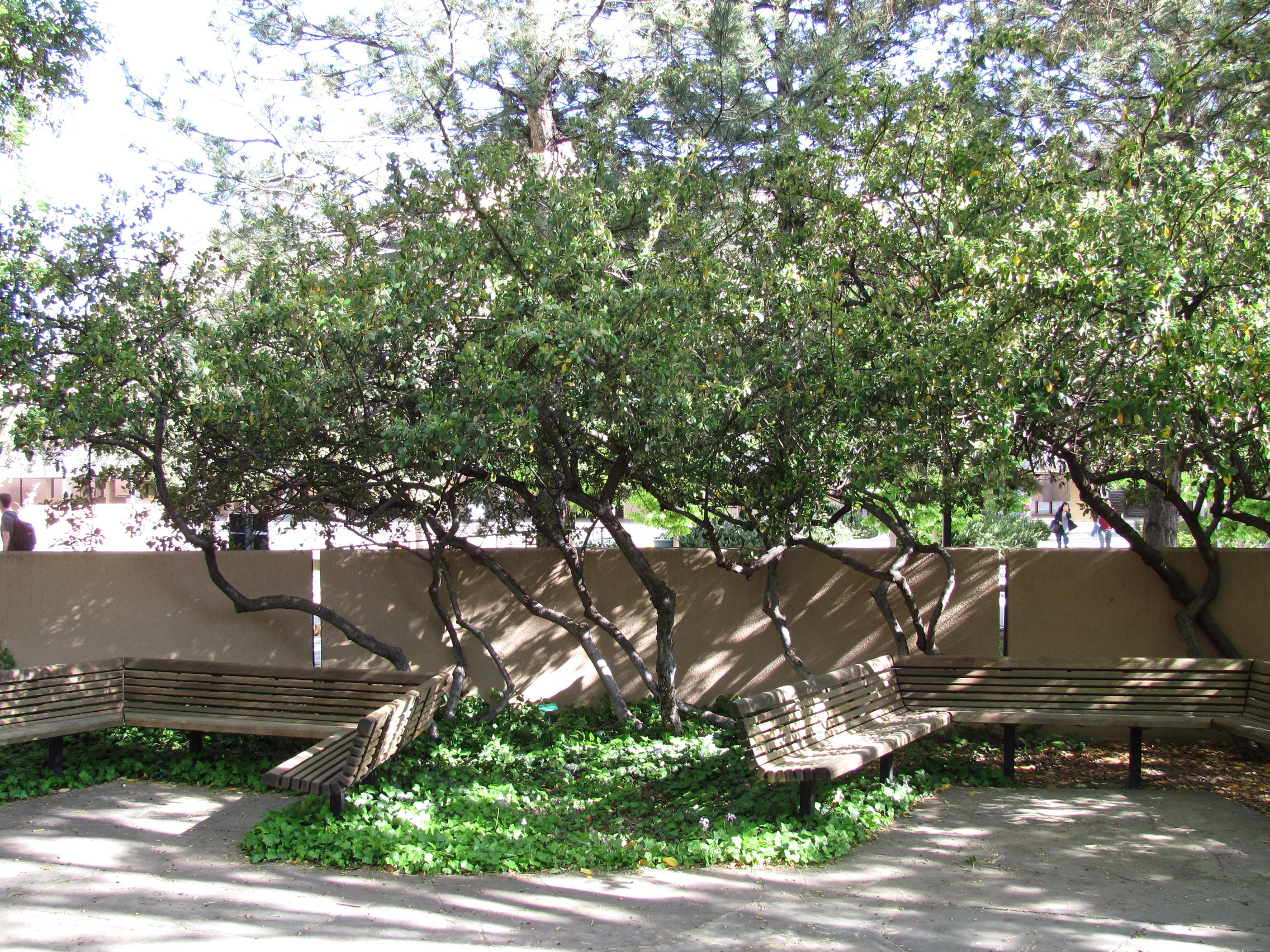
Cotoneaster lacteus
Parney Cotoneaster

== See also ==
- List of botanical gardens in the United States
