= ABQ BioPark Zoo =

Zoo in Albuquerque, New Mexico, United States

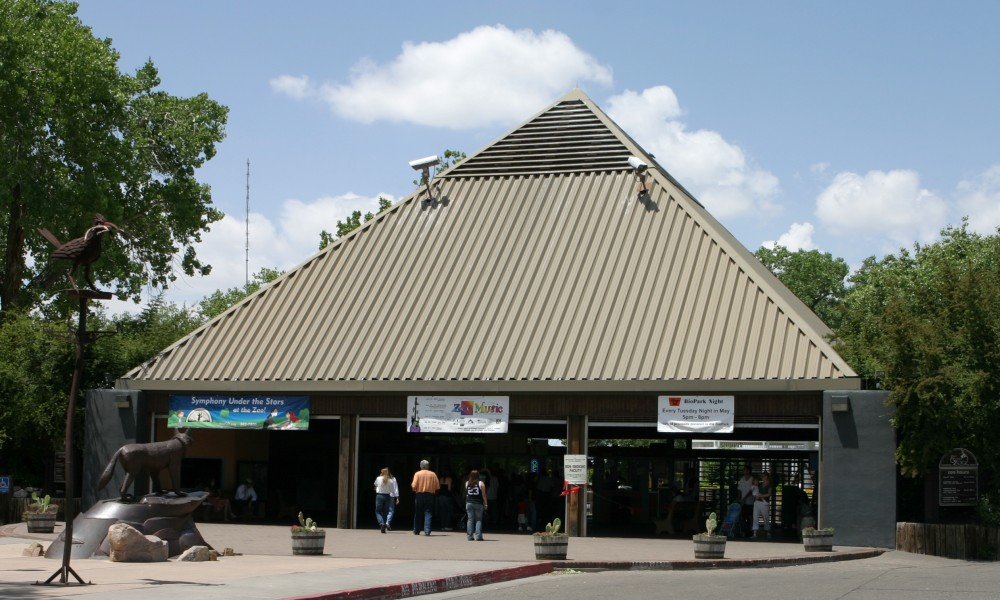
- Main entrance
- Interactive map of ABQ BioPark Zoo
- 35.0776°N 106.6627°W
- Date opened: 1927
- Location: Albuquerque Biological Park, Albuquerque, New Mexico, United States
- Land area: 64 acres (26 ha)
- No. of species: 200+
- Memberships: AZA
- Website: www.cabq.gov/biopark/zoo/index.html

ABQ BioPark Zoo, located in Albuquerque, New Mexico, is a facility of the Albuquerque Biological Park. Founded in 1927, the 64-acre (26 ha) zoo was originally known as the Rio Grande Zoo. Sections of the zoo include an Africa exhibit area, an Australia exhibit area, the "Cat Walk" and a herpetology area. An endangered species carousel was added in 2016. A narrow-gauge railroad connects the zoo to the other facilities of the Albuquerque Biological Park. Walking distance through the zoo is 2.27 miles (3.65 km).

The Albuquerque Biological Park is an accredited member of the Association of Zoos and Aquariums (AZA).

== Exhibits ==
=== Flamingo Crossing ===
A moated island located at the beginning of the zoo that holds the zoo's flock of Caribbean flamingos. The island is lush with bamboo vegetation.

=== Reptile House ===
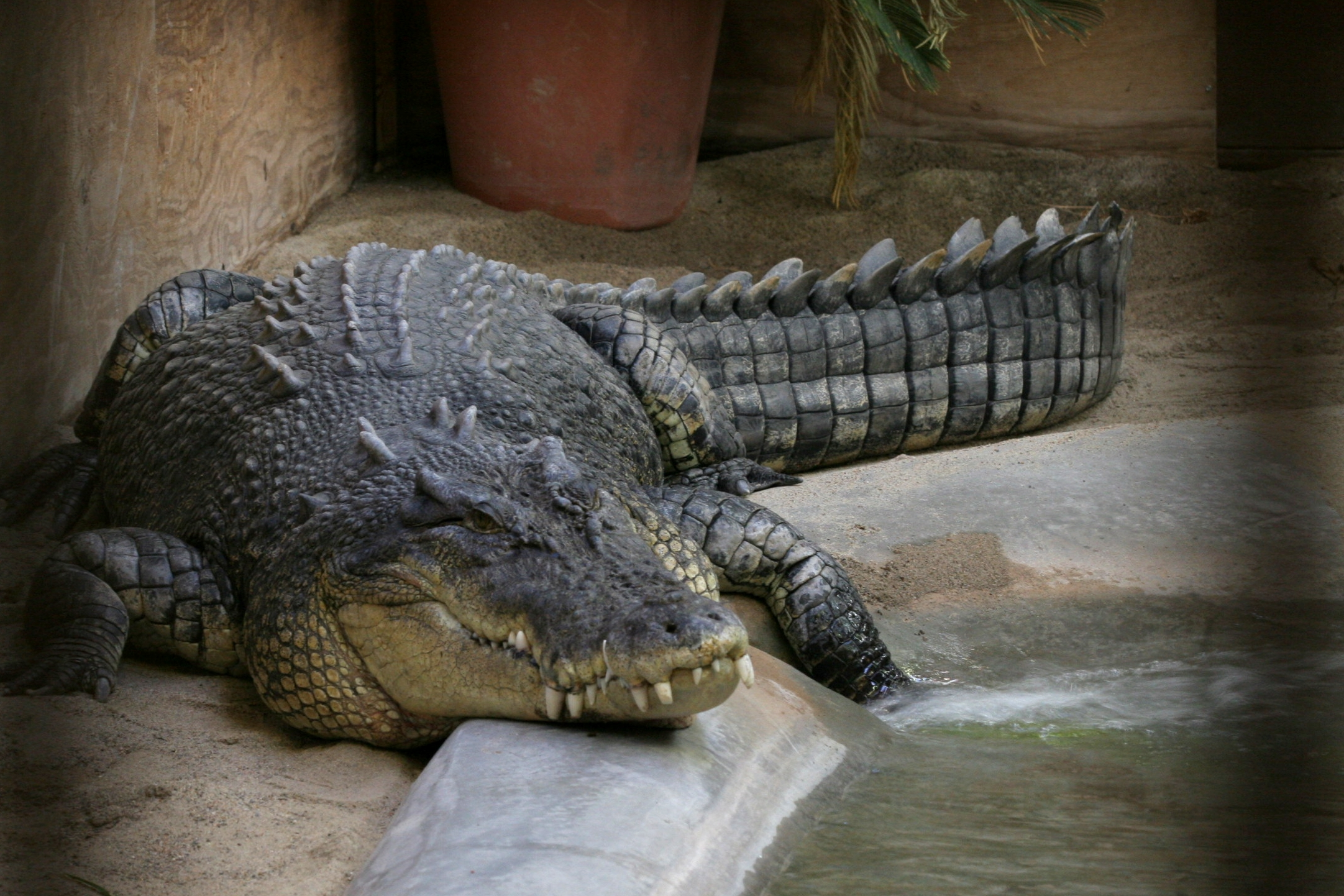
Saltwater crocodile at the zoo

The reptile house was remodeled in 2012. With the renovations the building houses mostly reptiles. The exhibit houses many species of snakes, tortoises and lizards. There are two large areas where the zoo's Komodo dragons are held. In a building located near the Reptile House the zoo's temporary home for a large adult saltwater crocodile and for slender-snouted crocodiles. On the outside of the Reptile House is the new Gator Swamp Exhibit, which is a large outdoor heated pool housing several adult American alligators. The reptile house received more renovations in 2017 to improve digital interpretive signage and interactive displays.

Five Texas horned lizards, born in August 2019 at the Zoo, are now on exhibit in the reptile building. The zoo has been breeding the species since 2017. The Texas horned lizard has disappeared from about half of its historic range due to habitat loss, human eradication of the ant populations that these lizards eat and displacement of native ant populations by invasive fire ants. To date, the zoo has successfully released about 70 young into the wild in Socorro County, New Mexico.

List of animals
- Alligator snapping turtle
- American alligator
- Asian water monitor
- Black mamba
- Blue iguana
- Chinese alligator
- Forest cobra
- Gray-banded kingsnake
- Green anaconda
- Green tree python
- King cobra
- Komodo dragon
- Mangshan pit viper
- Mexican garter snake
- Ornate box turtle
- Plumed basilisk
- Quince monitor
- Saltwater crocodile
- Tentacled snake
- Texas horned lizard
- West African slender-snouted crocodile

=== Raptor Roost ===
Several large aviaries house Andean condors, golden eagles, great horned owls and Steller's sea eagles.

=== Mexican Wolf Exhibit ===
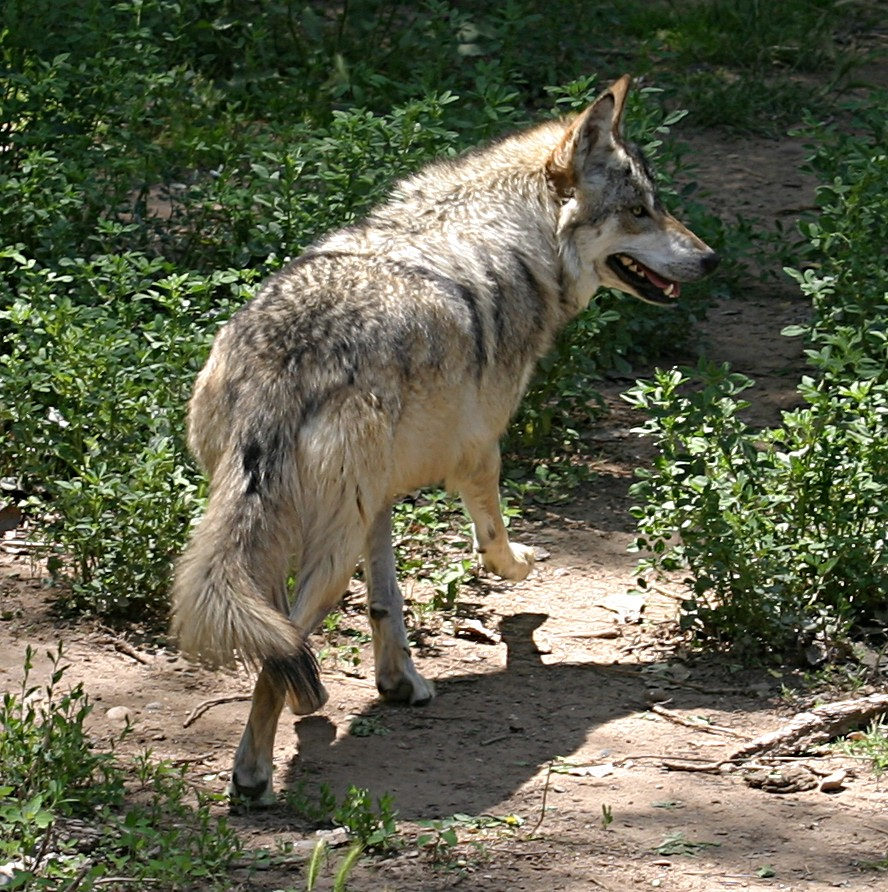
Mexican wolf

This exhibit holds the zoo's pack of Mexican wolves, the most endangered species of wolf in the United States. In June 2020, Mexican gray wolves Kawi and Ryder welcomed seven pups, this is the pair's second litter. The litter consists of five boys and two girls.

=== Inukshuk Bay ===
This large exhibit offers many views of the zoo's polar bears. One can see them through underwater viewing windows or walk to the top of the exhibit and watch the bears lounge, feed, and slide down the waterfall.

=== Catwalk ===
Grottos in this exhibit hold the zoo's big cats among other animals. Due to a renovation modernization of the Catwalk, African lion siblings, Kenya and Dixie, were permanently transferred to the Abilene Zoo in March 2023.

List of animals
- Binturong
- Bobcat
- Jaguar
- Meerkat
- Mountain lion
- Ocelot
- Red kangaroo
- Serval
- Snow leopard

=== Amphibians: Life on a Limb ===
With the renovation of the Reptile House in 2012, the zoo opened up Amphibians: Life on a Limb, replacing the original Gator Swamp, where the zoo used to hold its juvenile alligators. The building houses several species of frogs as well as other amphibians. The zoo also houses the only captive population of locust coquis, critically endangered frogs from Puerto Rico.

List of animals
- African bullfrog
- Amazon milk frog
- Axolotl
- Barred tiger salamander
- Sonoran Desert toad
- Dyeing poison dart frog
- Green and black poison dart frog
- Panamanian golden frog

=== Asia ===
This exhibit was originally home to just several elephant yards and two barns for the zoo's Asian elephant herd of two males and four females. The area was expanded in 2023, adding flex exhibits for the zoo's orangutans, siamangs, tigers and snow leopards.

List of animals
- Asian elephant
- Malayan tiger
- Siamang
- Snow leopard
- Steller's sea eagle
- Sumatran orangutan

=== Australia/Koala Creek ===
In September 2018, the zoo started making major progress in an expansion of the area with several different plans being put in motion. The zoo closed its seal pool, and the area will be repurposed in the expansion. New animals to be included in the expansion are dingos, little penguins, wallabies, and the return of koalas to the zoo. The Zoo will have and updated exhibits for most of its current animals and be a new home for the zoo's saltwater crocodile.

List of animals
- Common wombat
- Koala
- Matschie's tree kangaroo
- Tasmanian devil

=== Africa ===
Six acres of land holding 17 separate exhibits and 23 species of mammals and birds..

List of animals
- African wild dog
- Black-and-white ruffed lemur
- Cape vulture
- Capybara
- Chimpanzee
- Common warthog
- Hartmann's mountain zebra
- Hippopotamus
- Klipspringer
- Lappet-faced vulture
- Marabou stork
- Reticulated giraffe
- Saddle-billed stork
- Southeast African cheetah
- Southern white rhinoceros
- Spotted hyena
- Wattled crane

=== Ape Walk ===
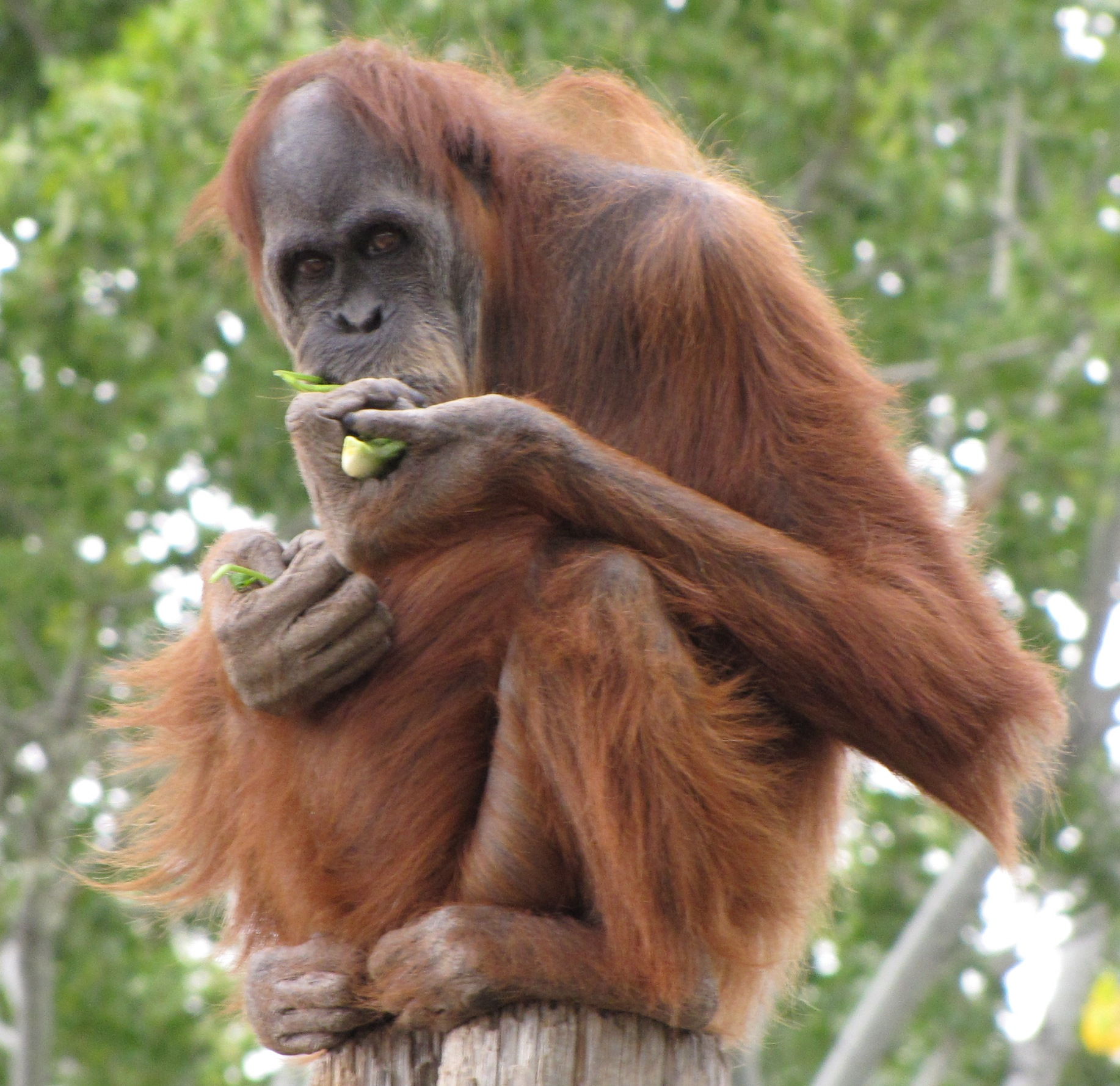
Orangutan at the Ape Walk exhibit

This trail houses the zoo's apes, including siamangs, and western lowland gorillas.

=== Birds of the Americas ===
Five species of birds from North and South America are mixed in this aviary: burrowing owls, Gambel's quails, greater roadrunners, hyacinth macaws and sun conures.

=== Penguin Chill ===
In July 2019, the highly anticipated penguin chill exhibit opened. The multi-million dollar exhibit was funded through a city tax bond. The exhibit features gentoo penguins, macaroni penguins, and king penguins, and is the first of its kind in the Southwest. The 14,550 sq ft (1,352 m^{2}) building includes a 75,589 US gal (286,140 L; 62,941 imp gal) main tank, above-ground and underwater guest viewing areas, a large interactive educational area and an outdoor deck overlooking the Zoo's main park. The outdoor deck also includes restrooms and a snack bar as well. The exhibit begins with a themed main viewing deck will with a panoramic view for visitors. The main pool depths varying from 5 to 12 feet (1.5 to 3.7 m) allow for plenty of space for penguin activity including special public feedings with keepers, swimming and enrichment. There is a glass floor area that allows guests to see penguins swimming beneath their feet as you travel through the exhibit. The exhibit includes natural day/night and seasonal lighting cycles to help regulate the penguins' hormonal balancing and breeding. The Zoo had early hopes for baby penguins with two macaroni penguin eggs being discovered in 2020, however both eggs were discovered to be infertile.

=== Birds of the Islands ===
Opened in 2020, the zoo opened the Birds of the Islands exhibit on the location of the former parrot habitat. This exhibit is part of the Zoo's Americas Trail. Adjacent to the aviaries is an exhibit for Aldabra giant tortoises.

List of animals
- Australian king parrot
- Bali myna
- Cuban amazon
- Major Mitchell's cockatoo
- Nicobar pigeon
- Princess parrot
- Rainbow lorikeet
- Red lory
- Socorro dove
- Superb starling
- Sulphur-crested cockatoo
- Wrinkled hornbill

== Gallery ==
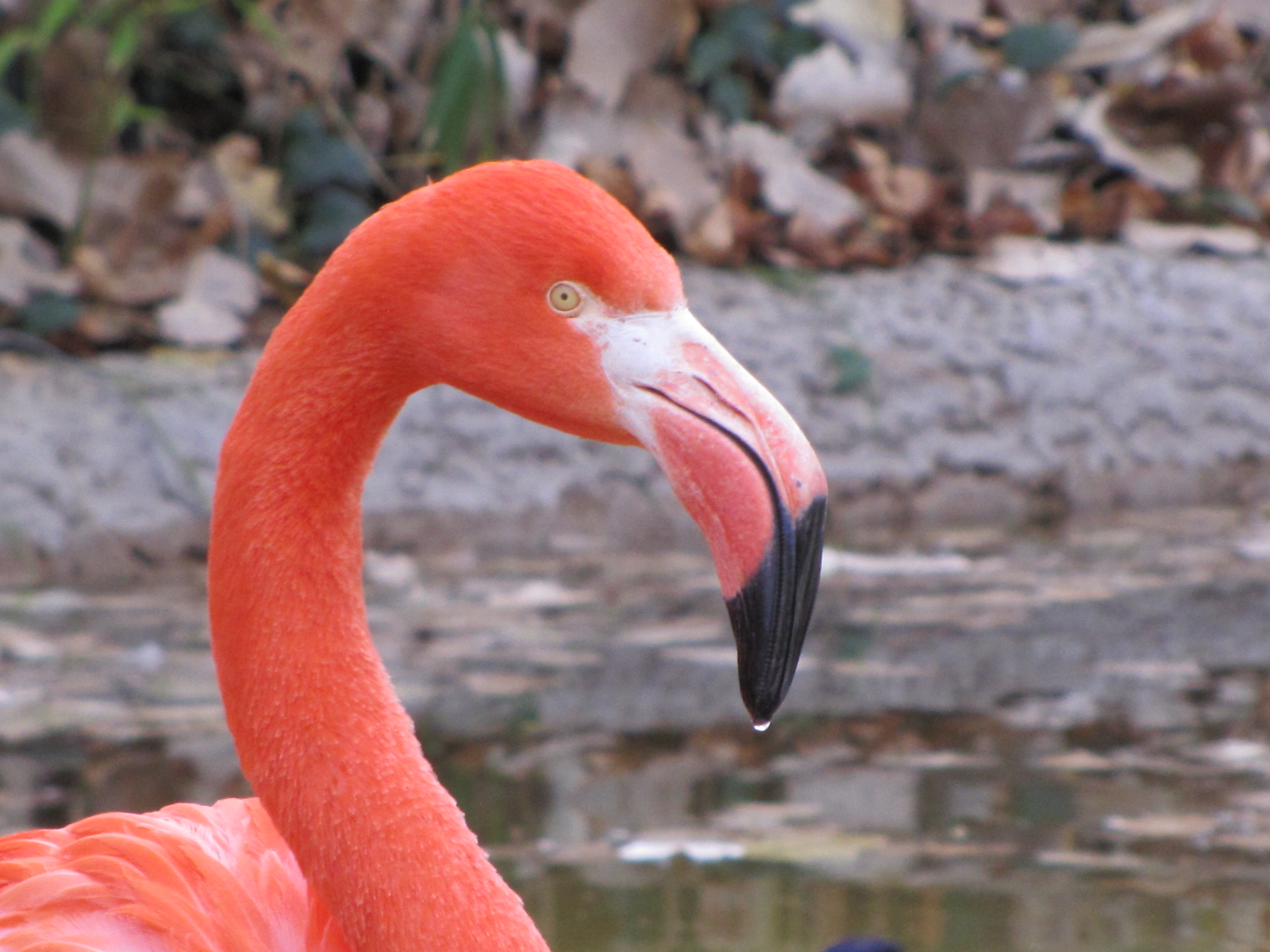
Flamingo at the zoo

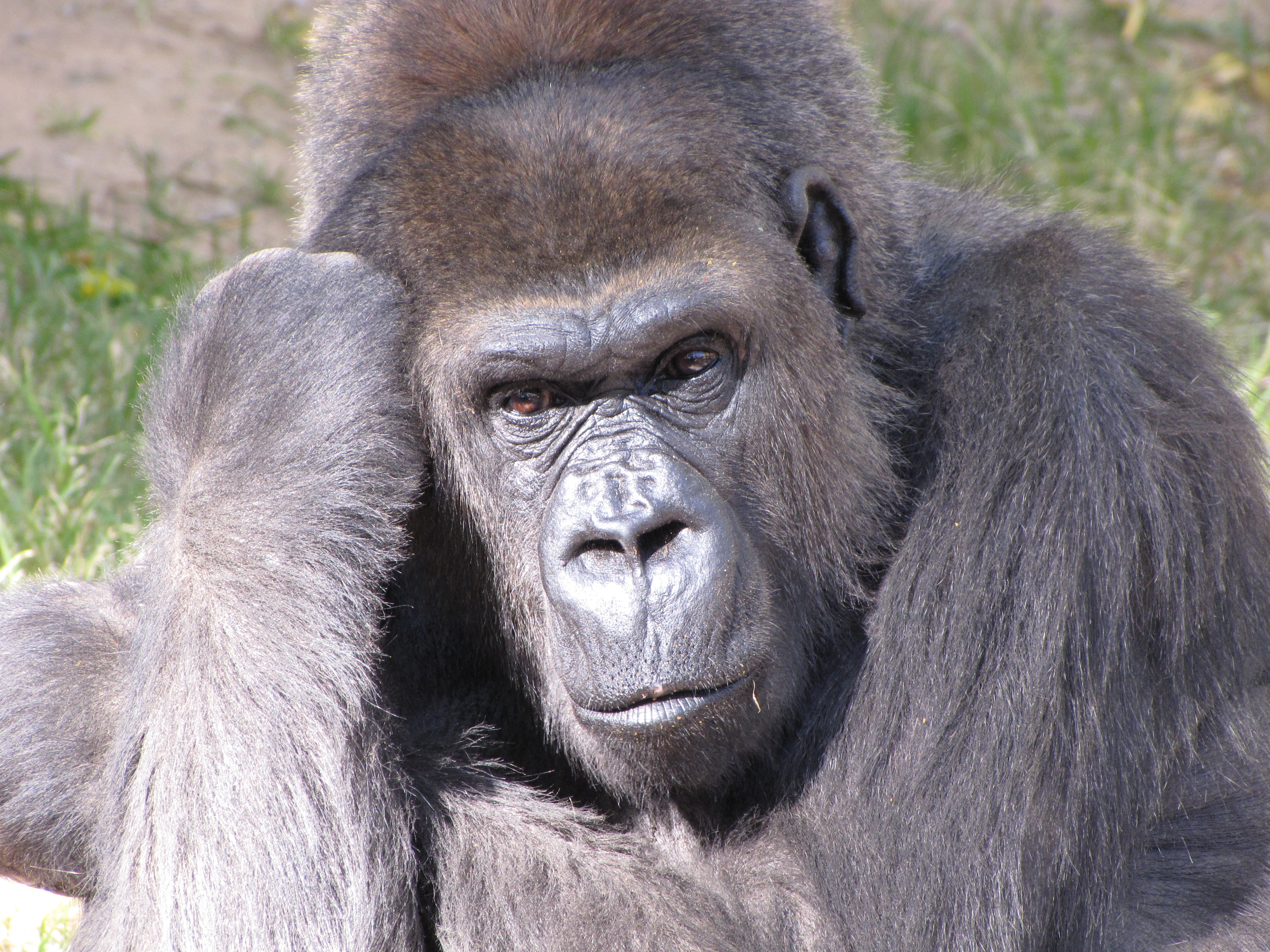
Gorilla

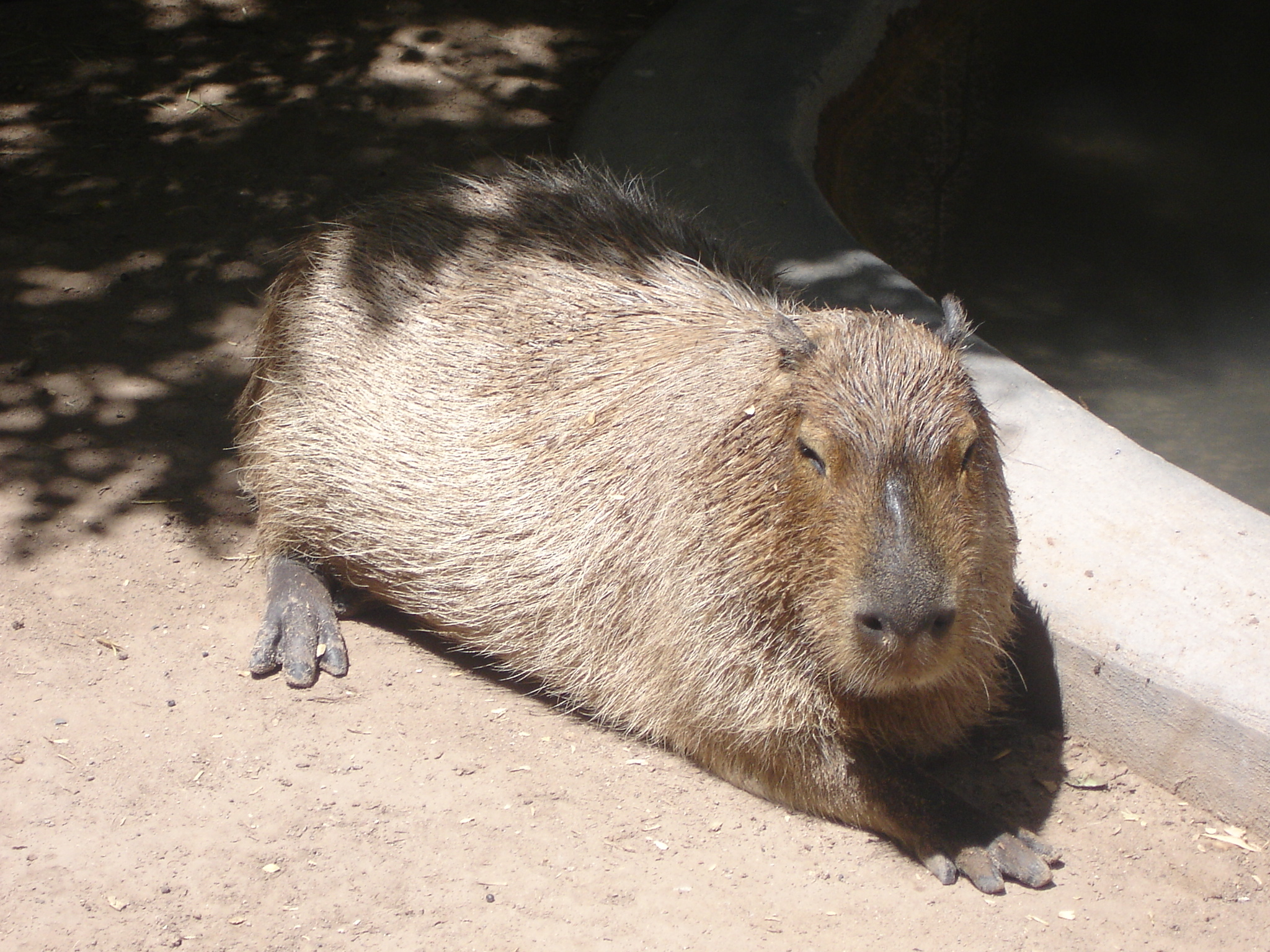
Capybara

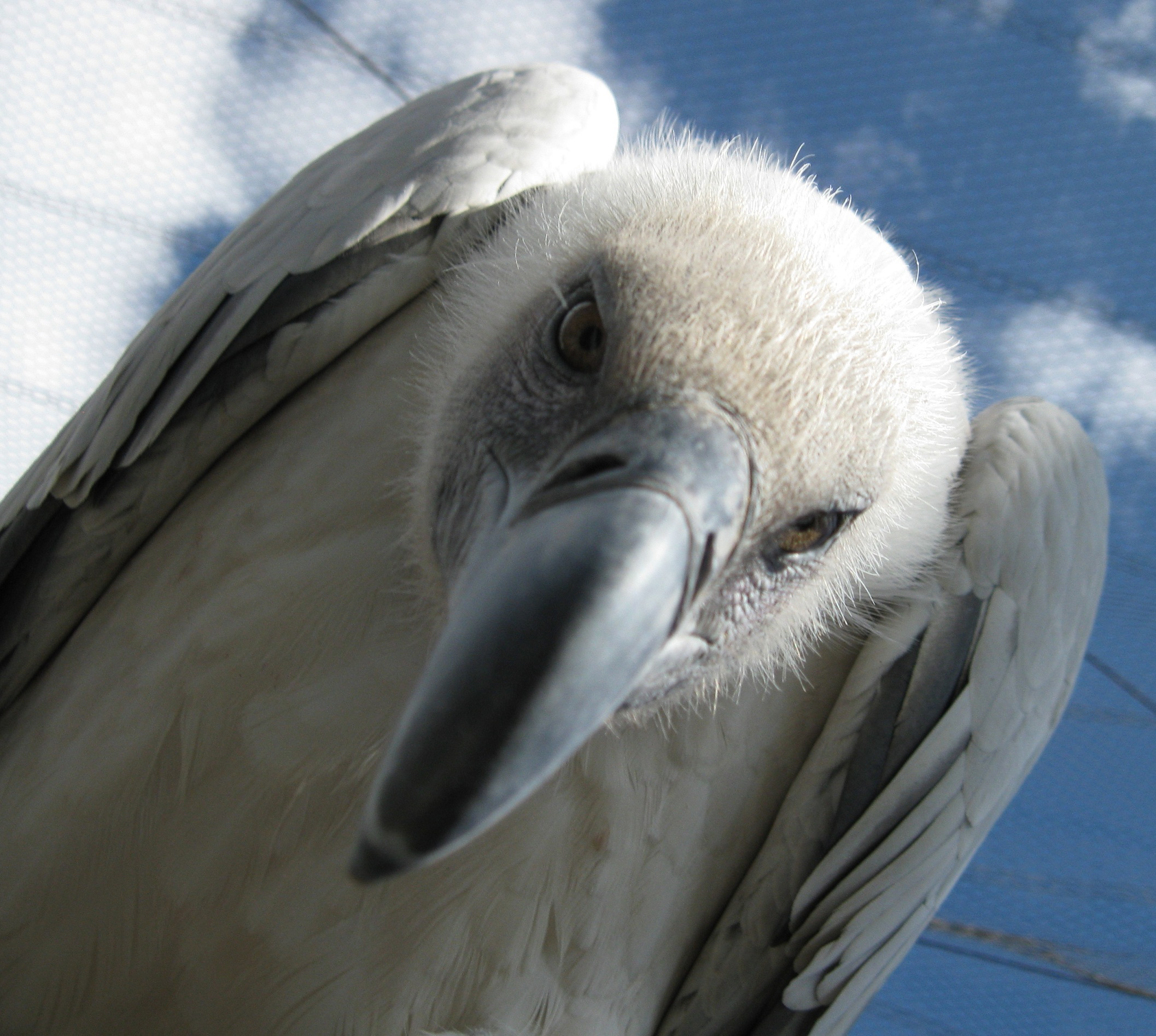
Cape griffon vulture

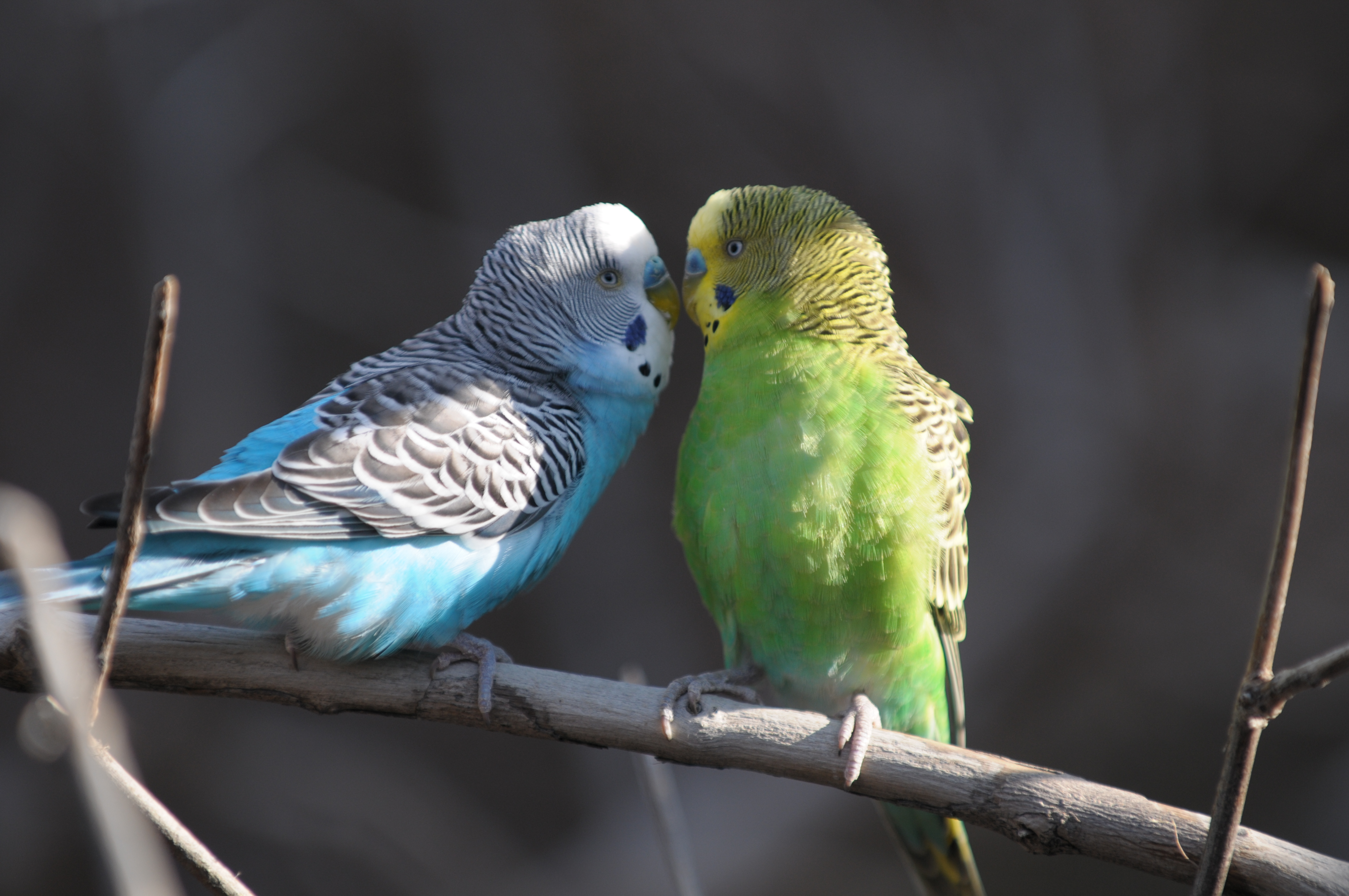
Budgerigars

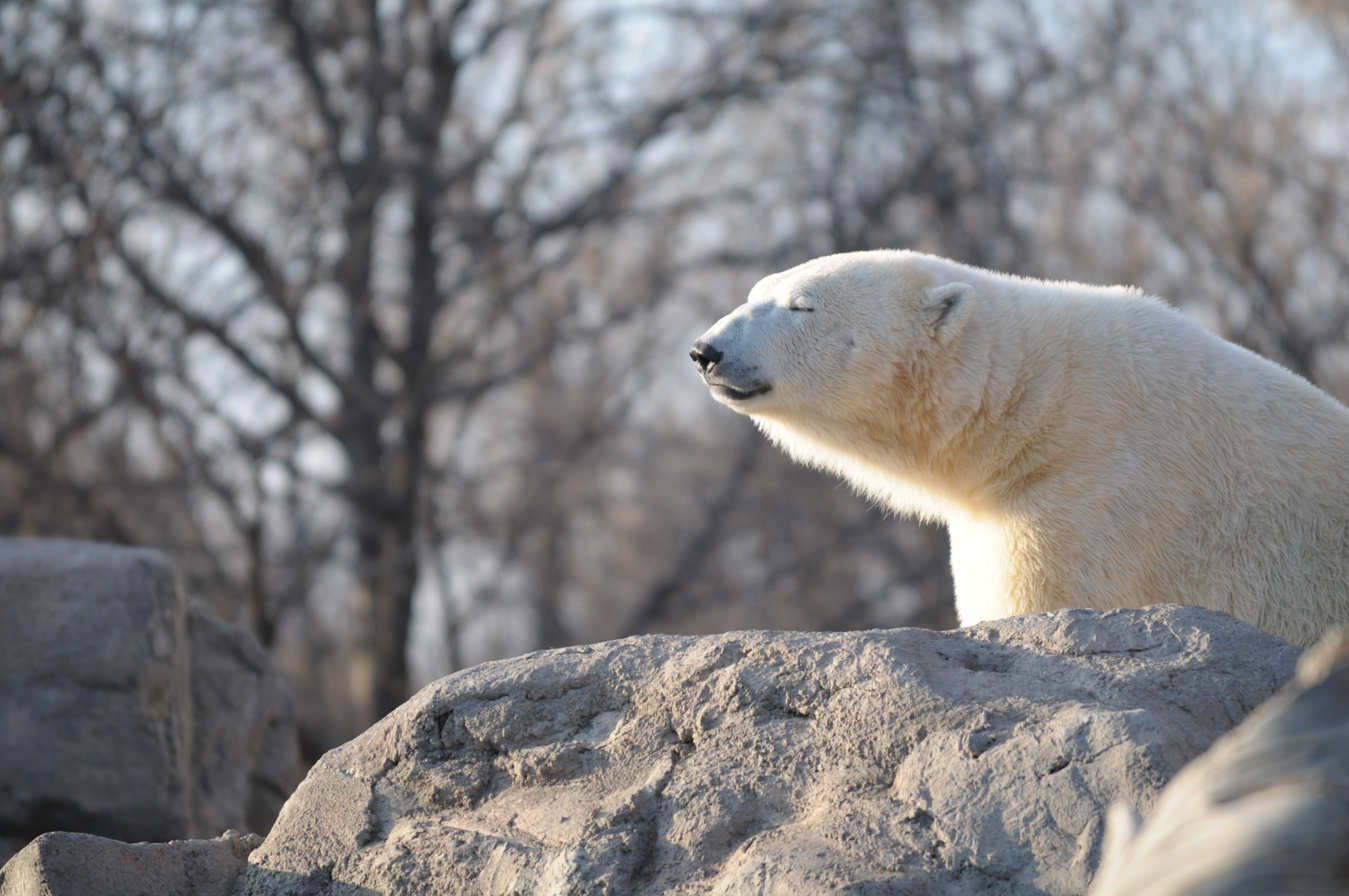
Polar bear

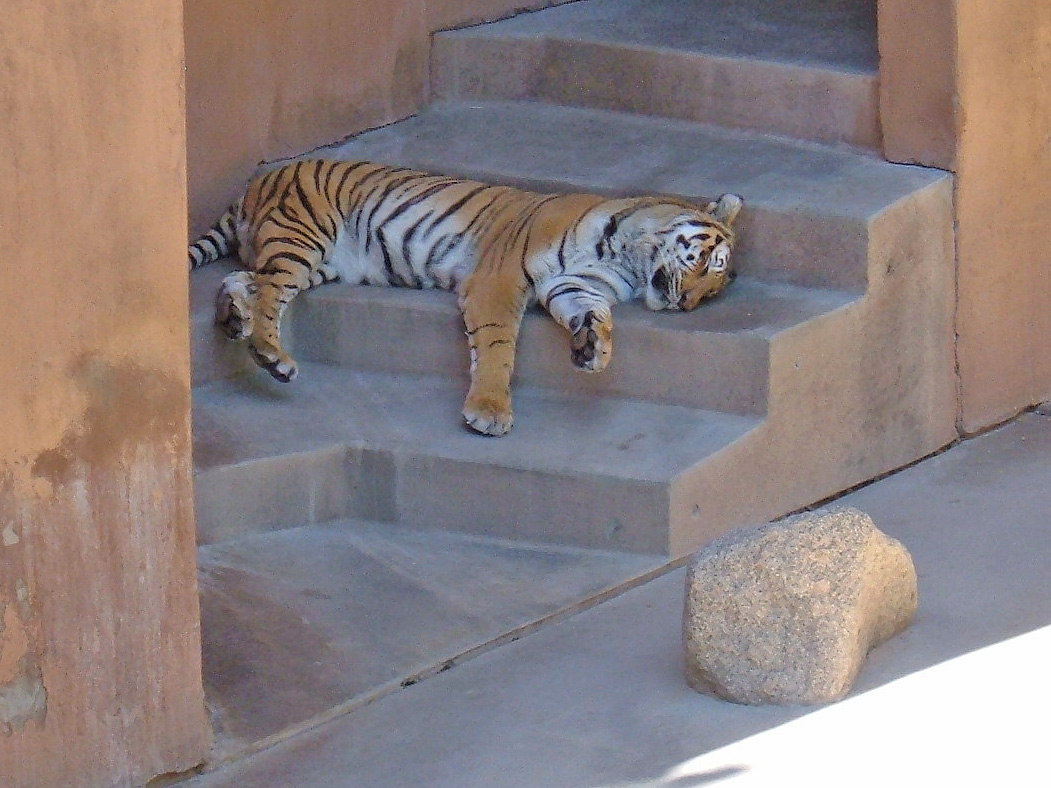
Tiger asleep in the shade

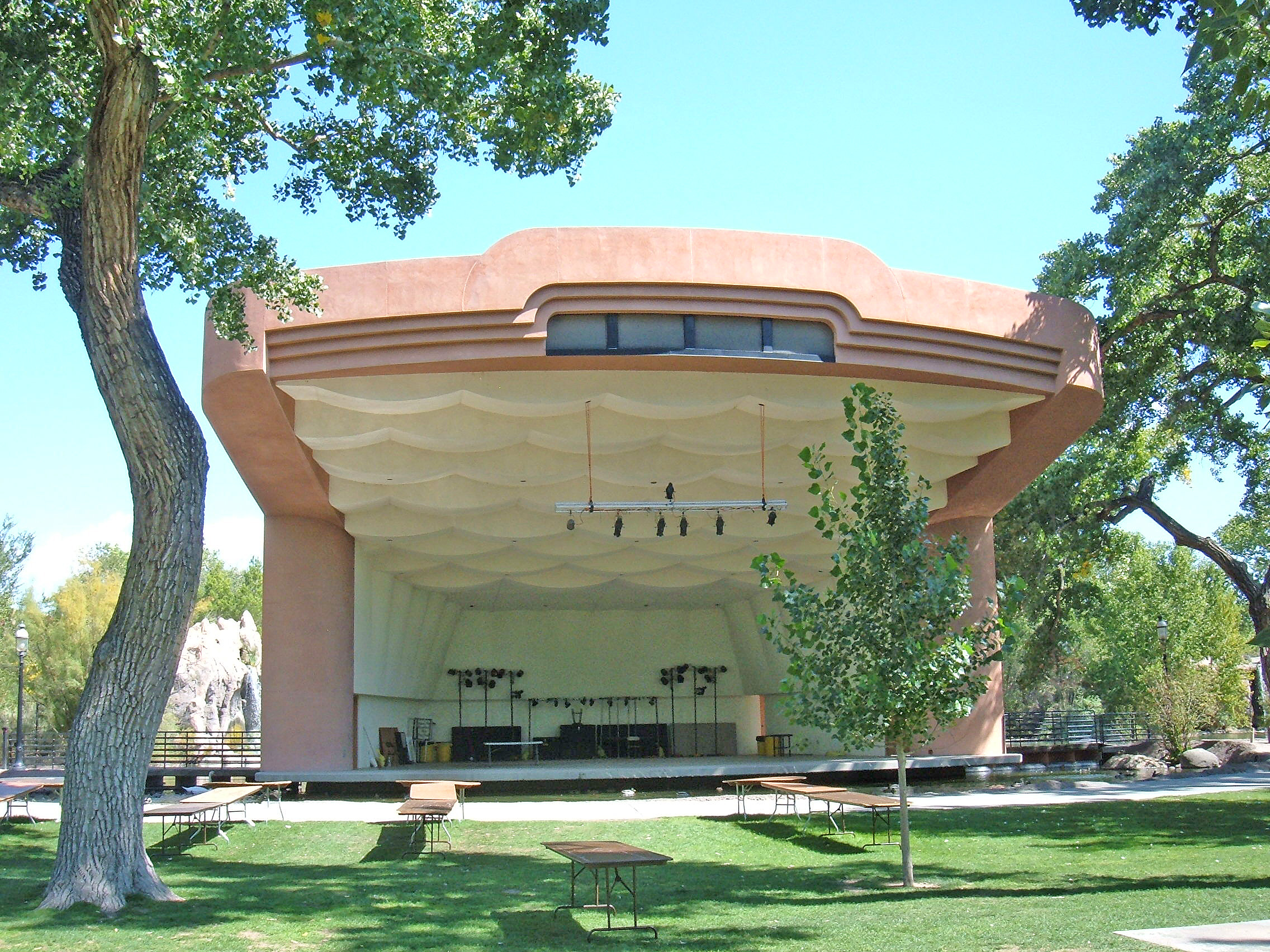
Many performances are held at the zoo

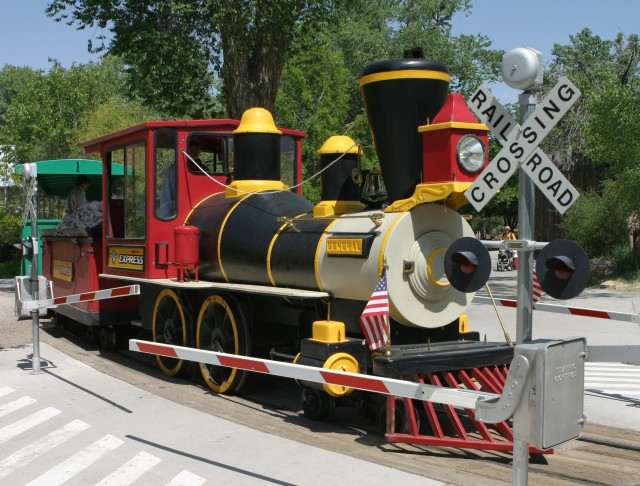
The train engine crossing a path in the zoo

== See also ==
- Albuquerque Biological Park
