= New Mexico State University Agricultural Experiment Station =

Research network in New Mexico, United States

The New Mexico State University Agricultural Experiment Station is a system of scientists who work on facilities at New Mexico State University, United States. It is based at the university's main campus in Las Cruces and at 12 agricultural science and research centers located throughout the state of New Mexico. It facilitates and administers the botanical gardens, the herbarium, and other agricultural facilities associated with the university.

- Fabian Garcia Science Center – botanical gardens, greenhouse, orchard, crop research fields, gazebo rentals, and turf demonstration plots.
- Mora Research Center – a small forest, about 49 acres (200,000 m^{2}) of irrigated tree plantations, and several research greenhouses. Located in the Sangre de Cristo Mountains, it is one of New Mexico's leading forest genetics programs and conservation nurseries.
- Chile Pepper Institute Teaching and Demonstration Garden – over 150 varieties of chili from all of the main species of Capsicum, including C. annuum, C. baccatum, C. chinense, and C. frutescens.
- Range Science Herbarium (acronym NMCR) – about 18,000 specimens, roughly half grasses, emphasizing the flora of New Mexico, with special strength in Aristida and Bothriochloa from western United States and northern Mexico. It also includes a beginning collection of about 170 mosses from New Mexico.

== See also ==
- List of botanical gardens in the United States
