= ABQ BioPark Botanic Garden =

Botanical garden in Albuquerque, New Mexico, United States

ABQ Biopark Botanic Garden
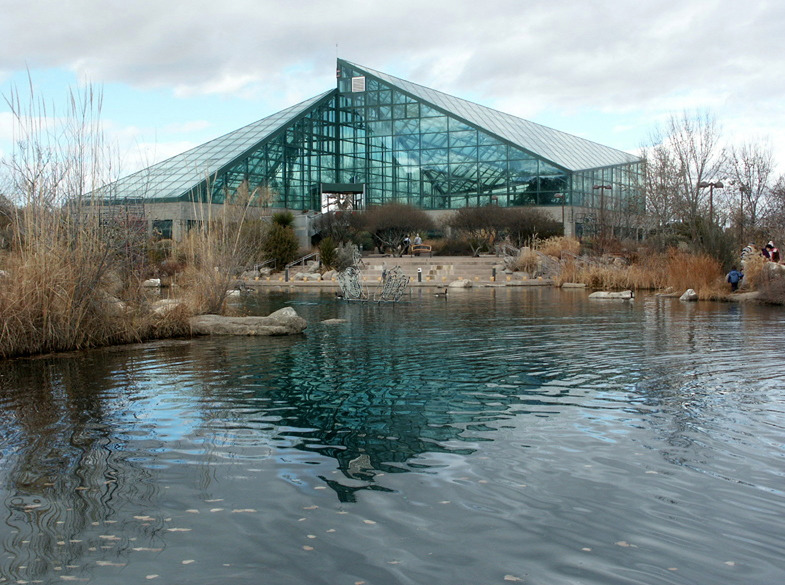
- Albuquerque BioPark Botanic Gardens
- Interactive map of ABQ Biopark Botanic Garden
- 35.0933°N 106.6813°W
- Date opened: 5 December 1996
- Date closed: January 1st, Thanksgiving, December 25th.
- Location: Albuquerque Biological Park, Albuquerque, New Mexico
- Land area: 36 acres (15 ha)
- Memberships: American Public Gardens Association
- Major exhibits: Old World Walled Gardens, Mediterranean Conservatory, Desert Conservatory, Camino de Colores, Rio Grande Heritage Farm, Sasebo Japanese Garden, Butterfly Pavilion, Railroad Garden, Children's Fantasy Garden, Dragonfly Sanctuary Pond, Cottonwood Gallery, BUGarium
- Website: http://www.cabq.gov/biopark/garden/

The ABQ Biopark Botanic Garden is a 36-acre (15 ha) botanical garden located at 2601 Central Avenue NW in Albuquerque, New Mexico, beside the Rio Grande. The garden showcases plants of the Southwest and other arid climates, and includes a 10,000-square-foot (930 m^{2}) conservatory. One wing of the glass conservatory houses plants native to the Mediterranean climates zones of Spain, Portugal, Turkey, South Africa, Australia, Chile and California.

A second wing features xeric plants from North American deserts. The garden also features various exhibitions showcasing plants of different local habitats in New Mexico, medicinal plants, a butterfly pavilion and other attractions. The Garden's design was awarded as the 2019 Architecture + Community Award by the New Mexico Architectural Foundation.

== See also ==
- Albuquerque Biological Park
- List of botanical gardens in the United States
