= Chileajo de cerdo =

Pork dish in Mexican cuisine

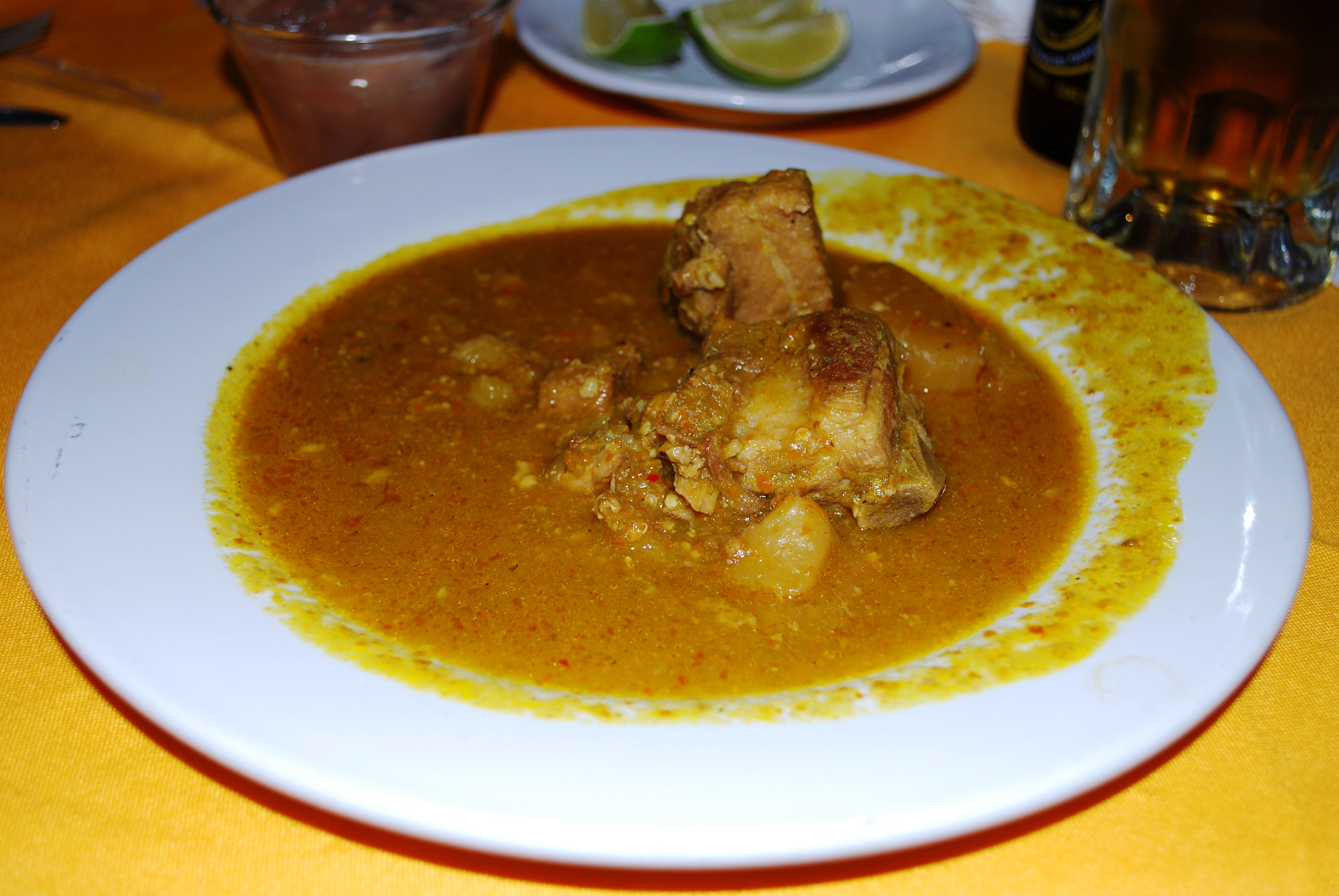
Chileajo

Chileajo de cerdo is a dish originating from Oaxaca, Mexico. It consists of pieces of pork boiled in water and cooked in a thick sauce made of toasted guajillo chili without seeds, toasted ancho chili without seeds, raw costeño amarillo chili without seeds, roasted and peeled garlic, cloves, oregano, cumin, red and green tomatoes, salt and pepper. This dish may be served with bayo beans.

A chileajo festival is held every year in Oaxaca.
