= Chile relleno =

Stuffed chili pepper dish in Mexican cuisine

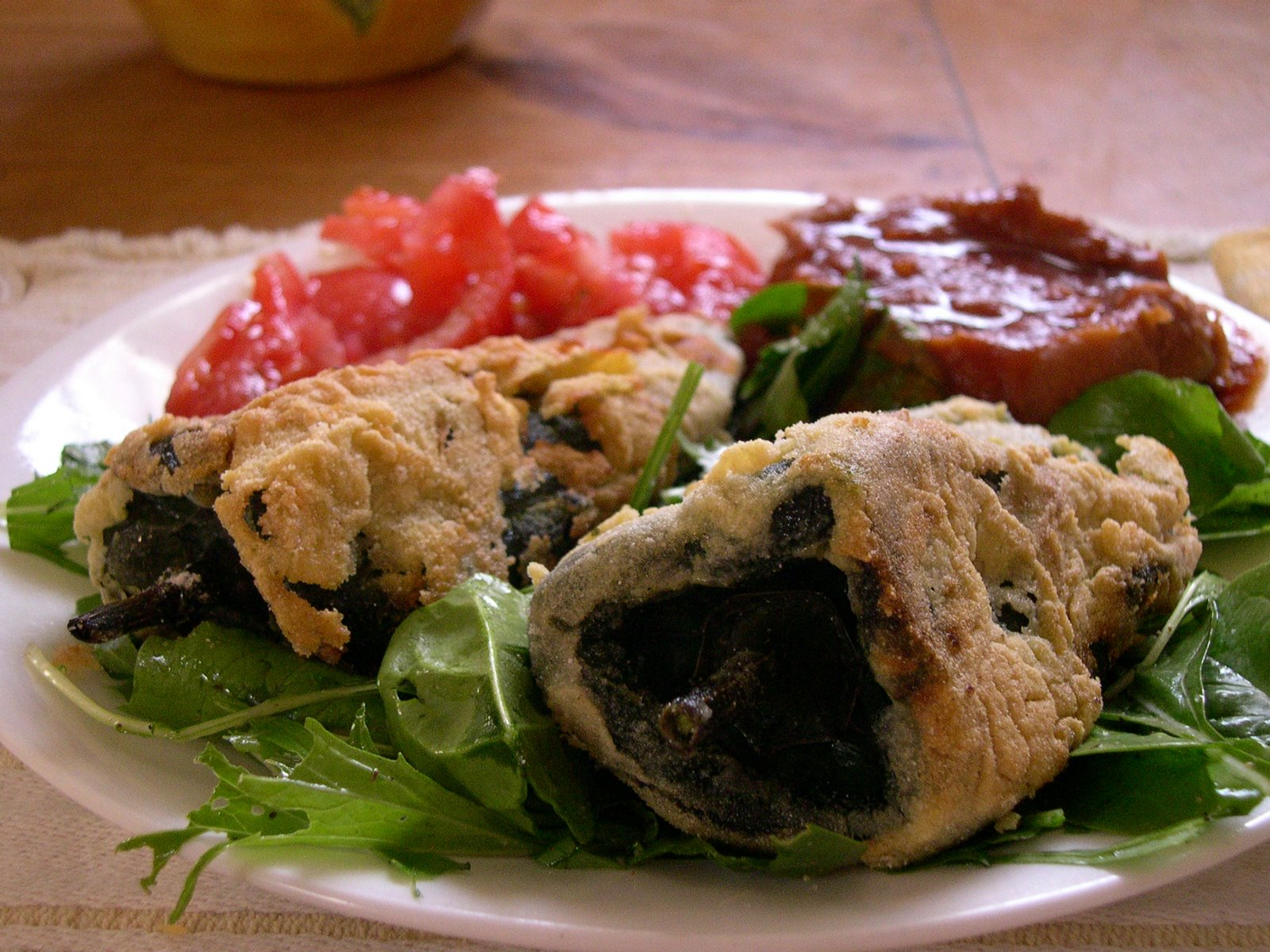
- Chiles rellenos
- Type: Stuffed vegetable
- Course: First or main
- Place of origin: Mexico
- Serving temperature: Hot
- Main ingredients: Poblano pepper, egg, cheese
- Variations: New Mexico chile, pasilla, meat

The chile relleno (Spanish pronunciation: [ˈtʃile reˈʝeno], literally "stuffed chile") is a dish in Mexican cuisine. In 1858, it was described as a "green chile pepper stuffed with minced meat and coated with eggs".

The most common pepper used is Puebla's poblano pepper, though New Mexico chile, pasilla, or even jalapeño peppers are popular as well. It is typically stuffed with melted cheese, such as queso Chihuahua or queso Oaxaca or with picadillo meat made of diced pork, raisins and nuts, seasoned with canella; covered in an egg white batter, simply corn masa flour and fried, or without any batter at all. Although it is often served in a tomato sauce, the sauces can vary.

== Regional variation ==
=== Mexico ===
Some regional versions in Mexico use rehydrated dry chiles such as anchos or pasillas.

=== United States ===
In the United States, chiles rellenos are usually filled with asadero or Monterey Jack cheese, but can also be found with cheddar or other cheeses, as well as ground or minced meat.

Variations, which can be seen based on regional tastes or experimentation, include:

- Chiles en nogada
- Pecan-encrusted
- Crab-filled
- Inside of a "chile relleno burrito"
- In a casserole form (which can be more practical for serving groups of people)
- Tuna-filled
- Squash blossom-stuffed
- Mushroom-stuffed
- Shrimp-stuffed

A recipe from 1914 (as "chili reinas") is published in a period guidebook to San Francisco restaurants.

In addition, the jalapeño popper can be described as a version of the chile relleno using jalapeños.

=== Guatemala ===
In Guatemala, the pimiento pepper is stuffed with shredded pork and vegetables. Like the Mexican version, it is covered with egg batter and fried. It is served with tomato sauce or inside a bread bun.

== Gallery ==
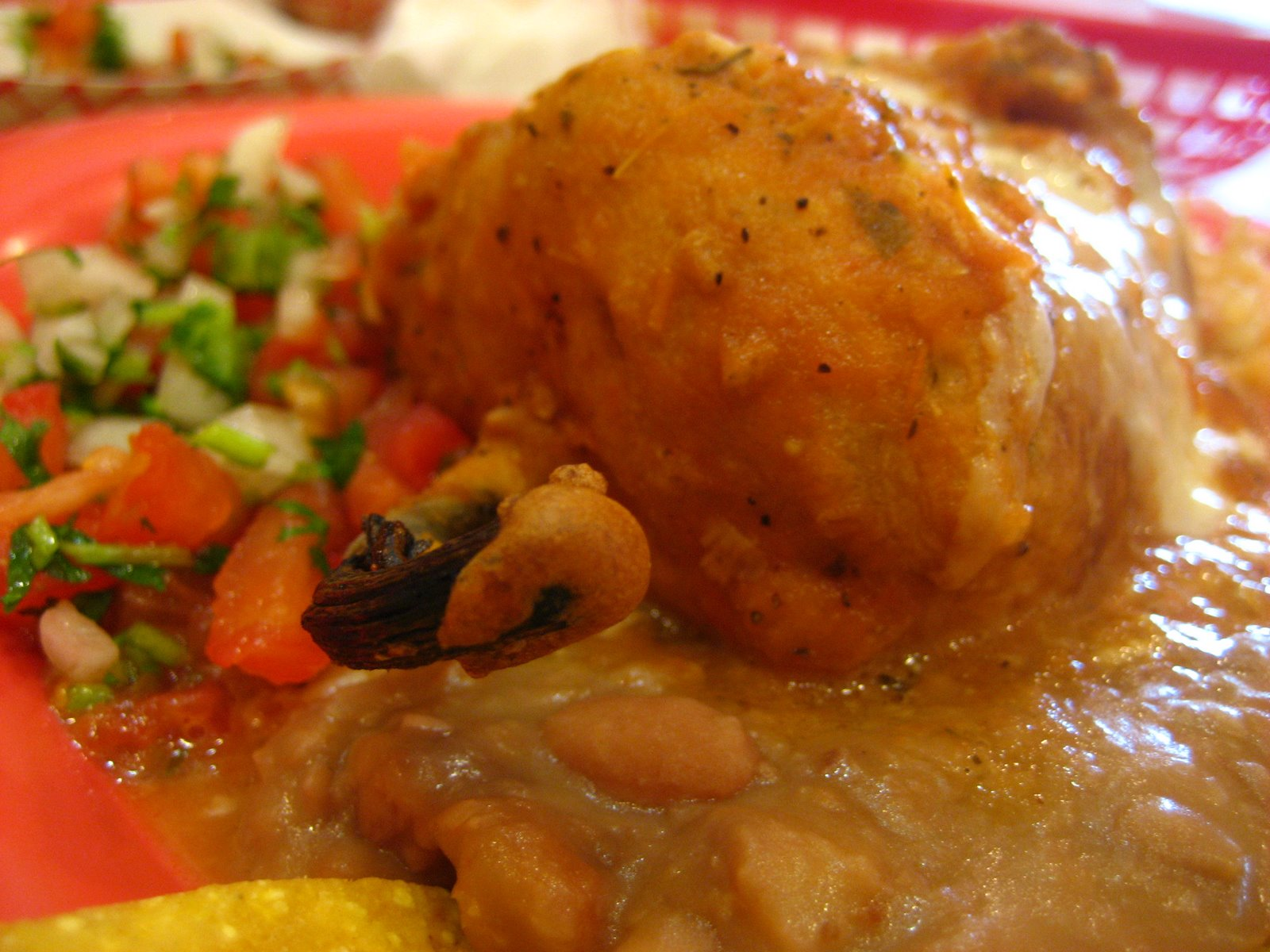
A variation on the classic recipe using egg batter rather than dipping in masa flour

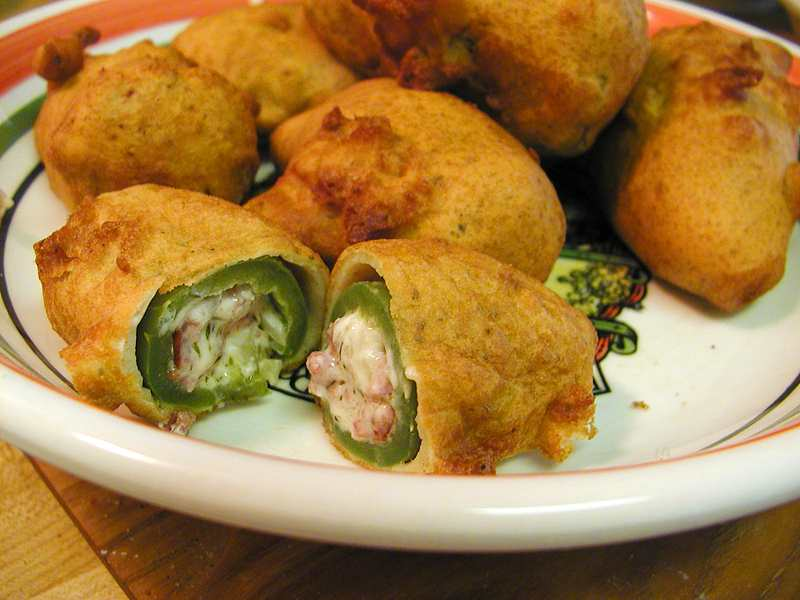
Jalapeño "poppers", another form of chiles rellenos

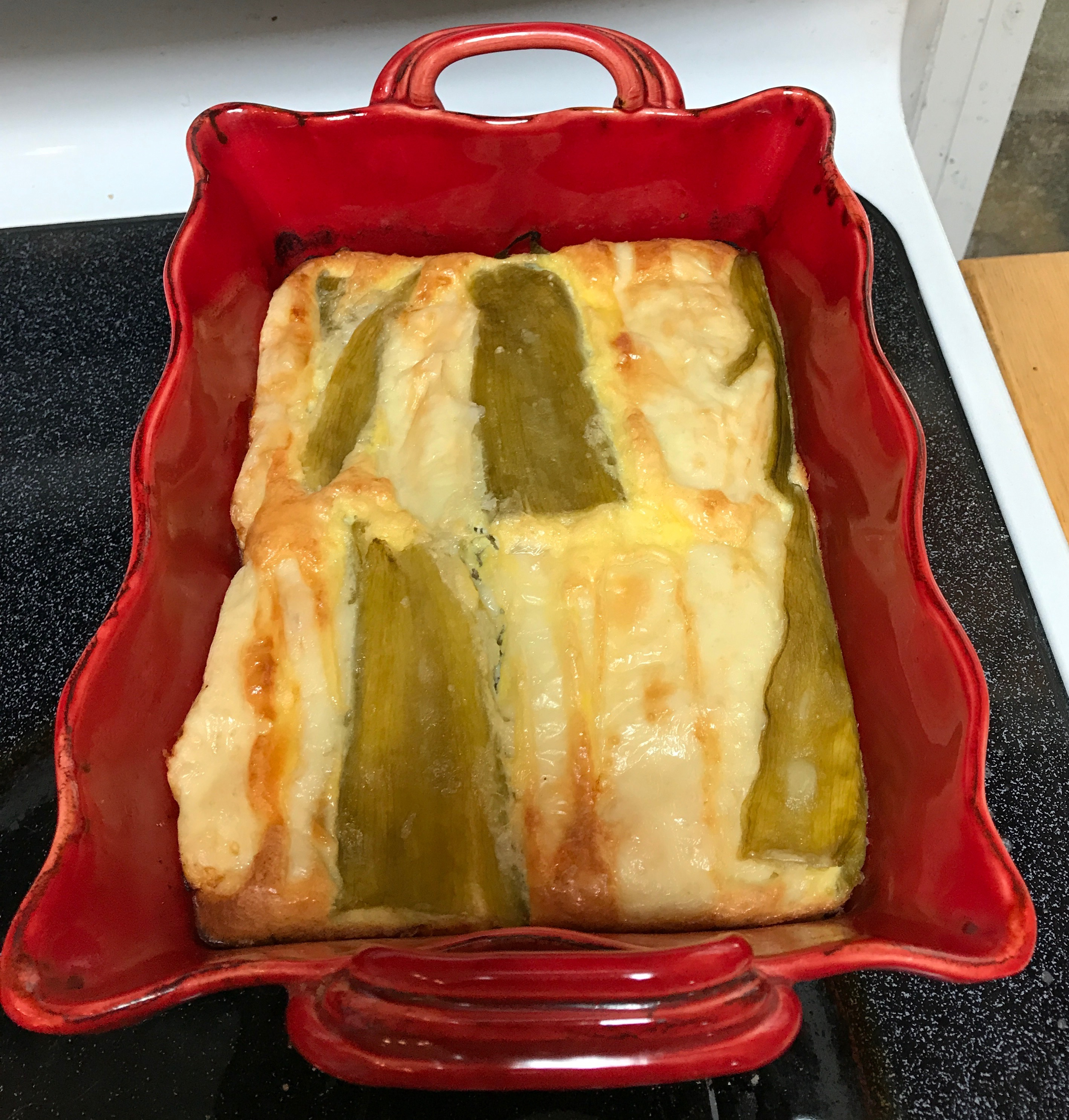
A Mexican-American variation which has chiles stuffed with monterey jack cheese and an egg batter, baked in a casserole dish

== See also ==
- Chiles en nogada
- Dinamita
- List of Mexican dishes
- Mirchi bada
