= Hufnagle =

Hufnagle is a surname. Notable people with the surname include:

- Bill Hufnagle, American motorcyclist, cookbook writer, and television personality
- Paul Hufnagle (1936–2017), American businessman and politician

== See also ==
- Hufnagel
