= Chipotle =

Smoke-dried jalapeño

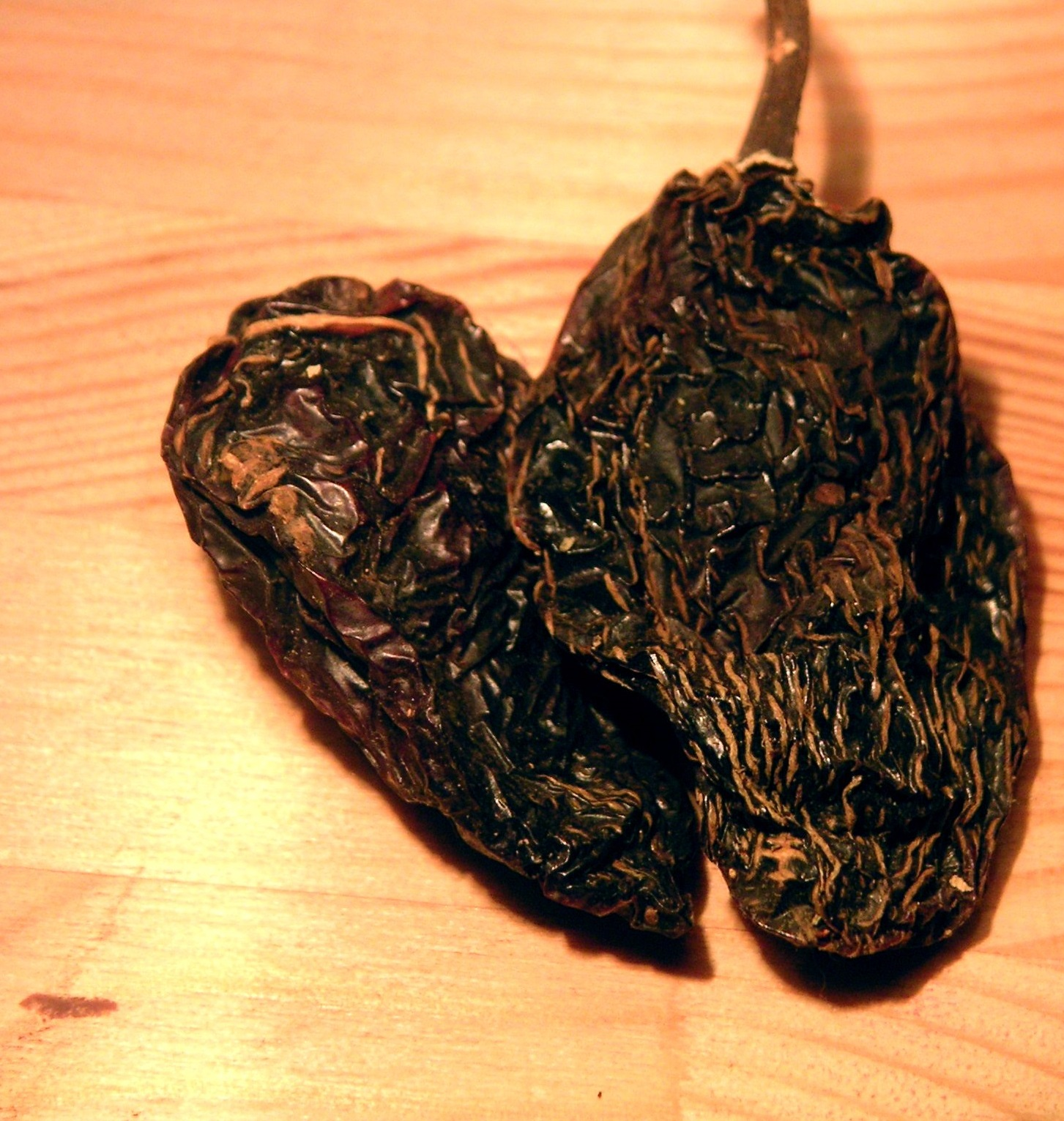
- Chipotles of the morita variety

- Heat: Medium
- Scoville scale: 2,500–8,000 SHU

A chipotle (/tʃɪˈpoʊtleɪ, tʃɪˈpɒtleɪ/ chih-PO(H)T-lay, Spanish: [tʃiˈpotle]), or chilpotle, is a smoke-dried ripe jalapeño chili pepper used for seasoning. It is used primarily in Mexican and Mexican-inspired cuisines, such as Tex-Mex and Southwestern United States dishes. It comes in different forms, such as chipotles en adobo (stewed in adobo sauce).

== Production ==
Jalapeño pepper (a cultivar of Capsicum annuum) is one of the most typical ingredients of Mexican cuisine. This chili pepper is consumed at the rate of 7–9 kg per year, per capita. It is mostly consumed fresh but also in different forms, such as pickled, dried, and smoked. Jalapeño varieties differ in size and heat. Typically, a grower passes through a jalapeño field, picking the unripe, green jalapeños for the market. Jalapeños are green for most of the season, but in the fall, which is the end of the growing season, they naturally ripen and turn bright red. In Mexico and the United States, there is a growing market for ripe red jalapeños (the last stage of maturation). They are kept on the bush as long as possible. When they are deep red and have lost much of their moisture, they are picked to be made into chipotles.

Smoking is a common technique of food preservation that provides a distinctive aroma and flavor and is traditionally carried out in a field open-oven. The smoking process can affect structural, chemical and nutritional properties of food. Furthermore, the type of wood used in the smoking process impacts the resulting smoked food. The smoking of jalapeños dates back centuries and was mainly used by the Aztecs, who are thought to have preserved the chilies by smoking them, a process they also used on meats. Chipotle production involves using firewood to dry and smoke the red jalapeño for six days in an open-smoker installation. The temperature is maintained between 65 and 75 °C, using mainly pecan wood.

Traditionally, the peppers are moved to a closed smoking chamber and spread on racks. Wood is put in a firebox, and the smoke enters the sealed chamber. Every few hours, the jalapeños are stirred to mix in the smoke. They are smoked for several days until most of the moisture is removed. The moisture within the red jalapeño peppers slightly decreases from 88% to 81% during the first three days, but by the end of the drying process, the moisture level reaches a final value of 6%. In the end, the chipotles are dried and shriveled like prunes or raisins. The underlying heat of the jalapeños combines with the taste of smoke, forming a flavor distinctive to chipotle peppers. Typically, ten pounds of jalapeños make one pound of chipotles after thoroughly drying. In recent years, some commercial producers have begun using large gas dryers and artificial smoke flavoring, which expedites the drying process but produces a less flavorful chipotle.

Other chilis can be smoked and dried for chipotle pepper, such as the bell or serrano variety, but smoked red jalapeños are most commonly used.

== History and etymology ==
The technique of smoke-drying jalapeños can be traced back to the early food preservation practices used in Mesoamerica, even before the Aztecs.

The name comes from the Nahuatl word chīlpoctli (pronounced [t͡ʃiːlˈpoːkt͡ɬi]), meaning 'smoked chili'.

== Varieties ==
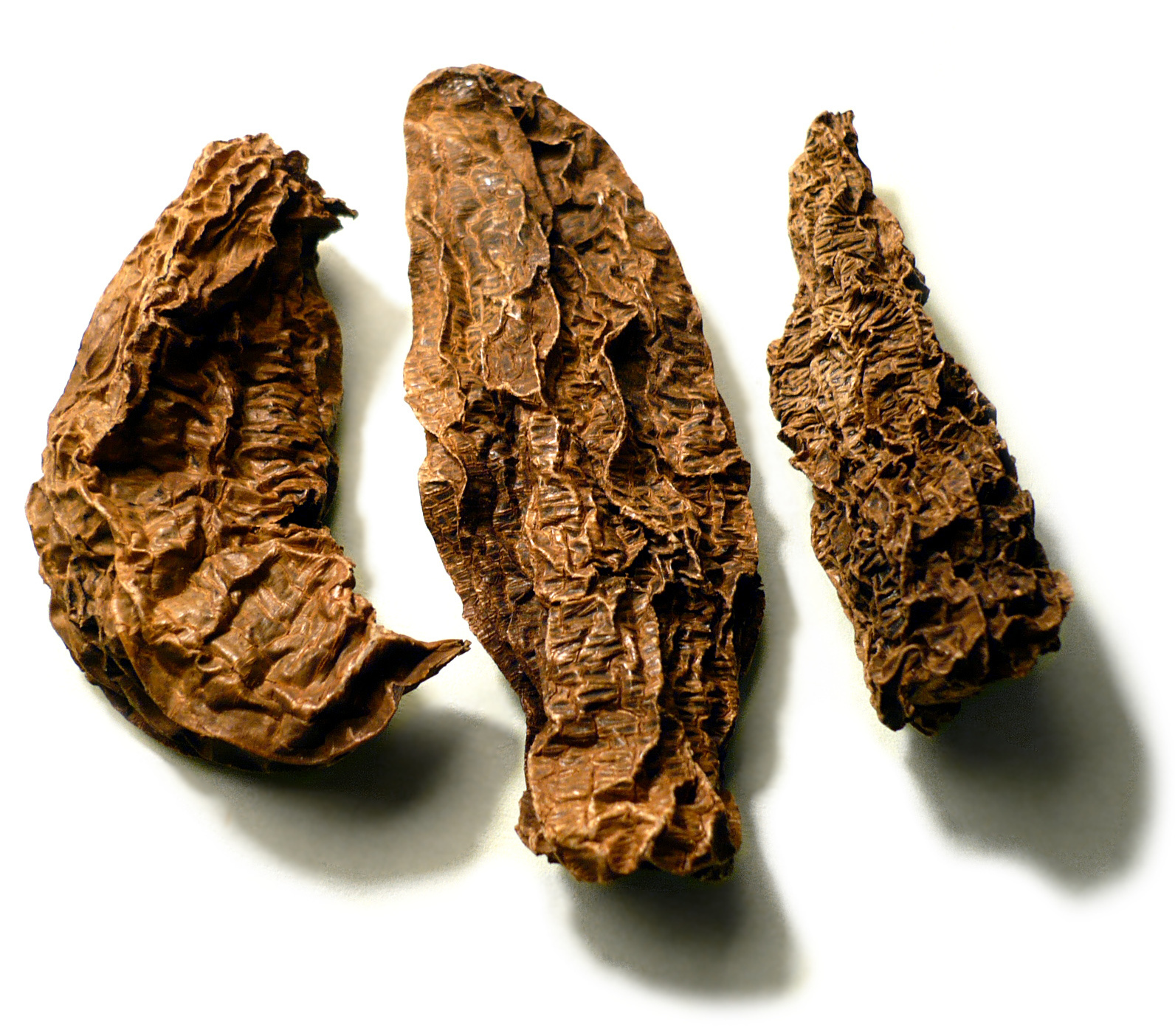
Chipotles of the meco variety

Chipotles are predominantly sourced from Mexico, where two varieties are produced: morita, which is most commonly found in the United States, and the larger meco, which is mainly used domestically. Morita means "small mulberry" in Spanish and is grown primarily in the state of Chihuahua; it is typically darker in color with a reddish-purple exterior. They are smoked for less time and, in many cultures, considered inferior to the meco. The meco, also known as chili ahumado or típico, is grayish tan with a dusty-looking surface; some say it resembles a cigar butt. This pepper variation tends to be smokier in taste and is the preferred chipotle of many natives. They are sometimes referred to as chili navideño because they are reconstituted and stuffed to make a traditional dish that is most popular at Christmas time among Mexican locals.

Chipotle grande is a smoke-dried Huachinango chili with a similar flavor profile; however, the chili is larger and higher in cost. Sold fresh at the market, this variation of the chipotle pepper will typically sell for three to four times as much as jalapeño.

Many pair this spice with annatto, cumin, ginger, oregano and tomato powder. Additionally, it is commonly paired with traditional dishes such as bean soup, pimento cheese, tomatillo salsa, fish tacos, and grilled flank steak.

=== Forms of chipotle ===
Chipotles are purchased in numerous forms: chipotle powder, chipotle flakes, chipotle pods, canned chipotles in adobo sauce, concentrated chipotle base, and wet chipotle meat marinade.

Canned adobo sauce is the most common form in the United States of America, though its marinade or food preservative form originated in Spain. The marinade typically contains various spices, herbs, and vegetables, including tomatoes, onions, powdered dried chilis, garlic, and vinegar. Chipocludo, a term for preserving chipotles practiced in Central Mexico, refers to conservation in a jar of brown sugar and vinegar marinade. En adobo or chipotles adobado are denominations for seasoned canned chipotles in sauce.

== Use ==
Chipotles impart a relatively mild but earthy spiciness to many dishes in Mexican cuisine. The chilis are used to make various salsas. Chipotle can be ground and combined with other spices to make a meat marinade – adobo. Chipotle is used, typically in powdered form, as an ingredient in homemade and commercial products, including some brands of barbecue sauce and hot sauce, as well as in some chili con carnes and stews. Usually, when used commercially, the product is advertised as having chipotle in it.

Chipotles are spicy and have a distinctive smoky flavor. The flesh is thick, so the chilis are usually used in a slow-cooked dish rather than raw. They can also be lightly toasted on a dry comal or skillet until they are fragrant and slightly swell. When overcooked, they can be bitter. For some traditional Mexican sauces, the toasted chilis would be sautéed in oil or lard before being pureed. The chilis can also be soaked in warm water or stock until they become pliable and then can be added to a dish. The different forms of chipotle can be added to soups, stews, and in the braising liquid for meat. They can also accompany beans, pickled vegetable mixes, scrambled eggs, or chilaquiles. They can also be stuffed, baked, and added to cake or brownies.

==== Nutritional value ====
Nutritional data per 100 g (3.5 oz)
Energy	1355 kj / 324 kcal
Carbohydrates	69.86 g
Sugars	41.06 g
Fiber	28.7 g
Fat	4.36 g
Protein	10.58 g
Vitamins	
Vitamin A, IU	26488 IU
Vitamin A, RAE	1324 msg_RAE
Vitamin B (folate)	51 mcg
Vitamin B_{3} (Niacin)	8.669 mg
Vitamin B_{6}	0.810 mg
Vitamin C (total ascorbic acid)	31.4 mg
Vitamin E (alpha-tocopherol)	3.14 mg
Vitamin K (phylloquinone)	108.2 mcg
Minerals	
Calcium	45 mg
Copper	0.228 mg
Iron	6.04 mg
Magnesium	88 mg
Manganese	0.821 mg
Phosphorus	159 mg
Potassium	1870 mg
Sodium	91 mg
Zinc	1.02 mg
Other constituents	
Water	7.15 g

== See also ==
- Ancho – The dried form of the poblano chili.
- Guajillo – The dried form of the mirasol chili pepper.
- Pasilla – The dried form of the chilaca chili pepper.
- List of smoked foods
