= Hoefnagel =

Hoefnagel is a surname. Notable people with the surname include:

- Hanneke Hoefnagel (born 1988), Dutch gymnast
- Jacob Hoefnagel (1573–c. 1632), Flemish artist, diplomat, merchant, and politician
- Joris Hoefnagel (1542–1601), Flemish artist and merchant

== See also ==
- Hufnagel
