= Pasilla =

Dried form of the chilaca chili pepper

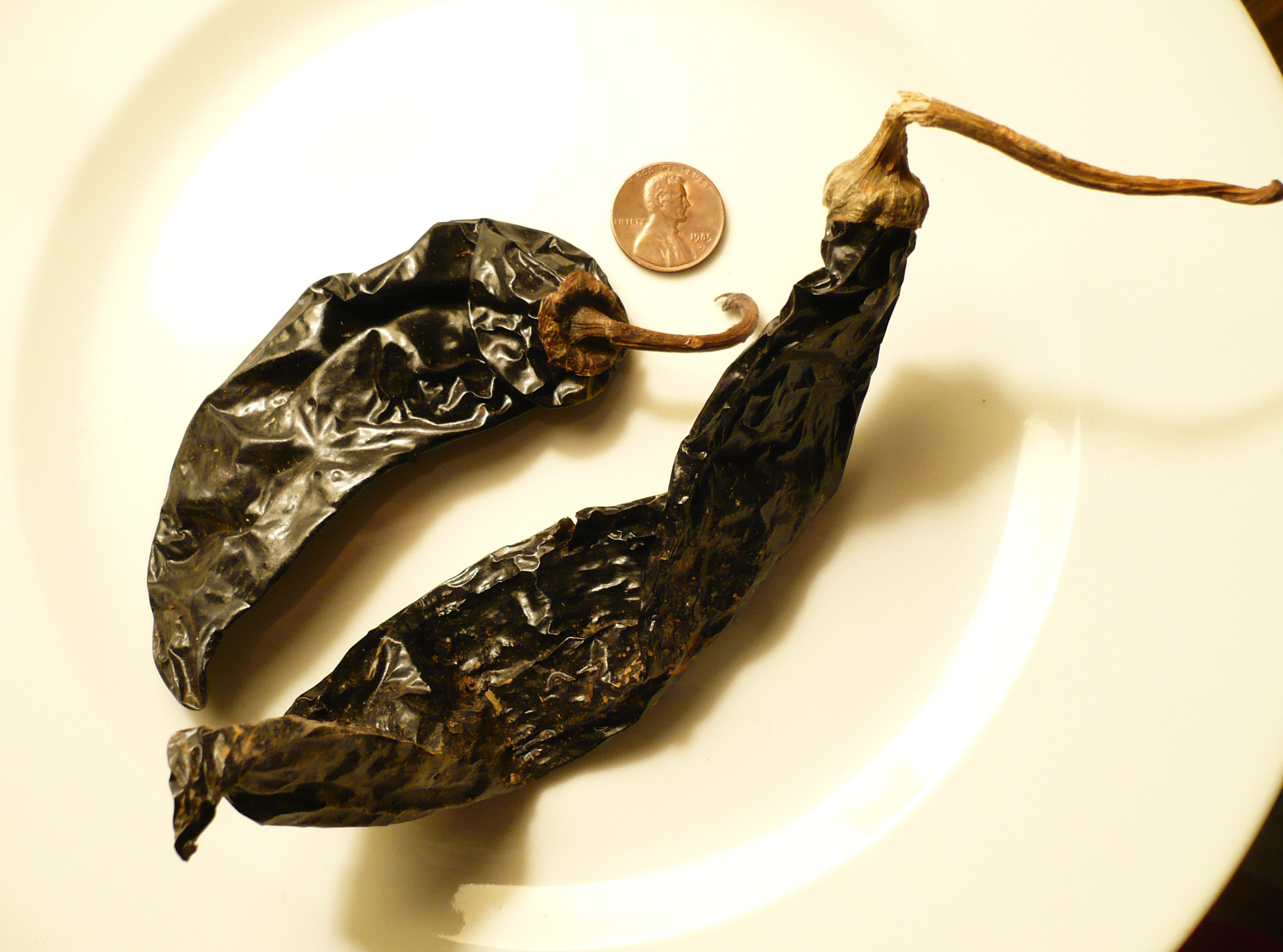
- Two pasilla chiles
- Species: Capsicum annuum
- Heat: Low
- Scoville scale: 1,000–3,999 SHU

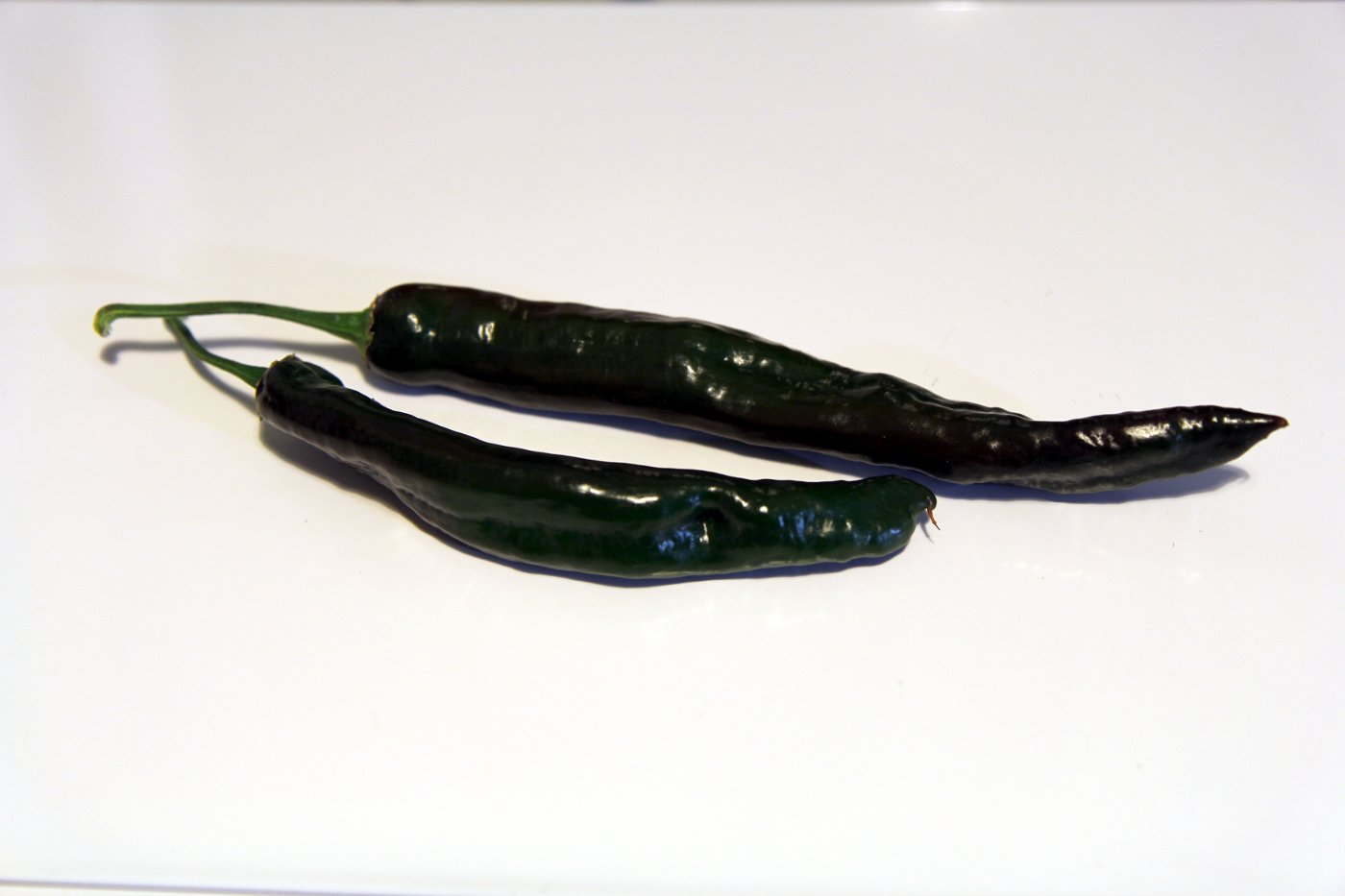
Fresh dark brown chilaca peppers

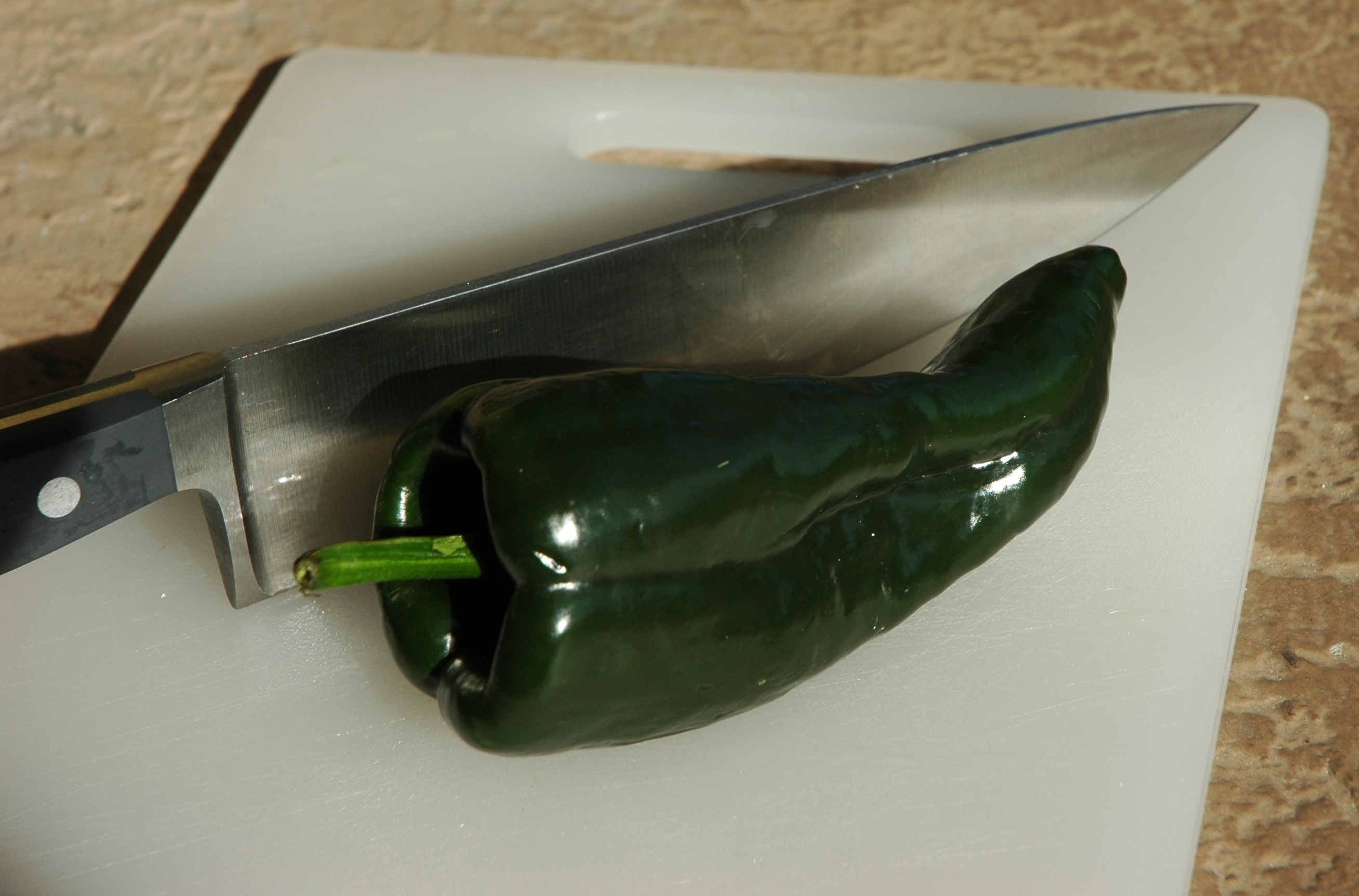
A fresh poblano pepper, often sold under the name 'pasilla' north of Mexico

The pasilla chile (/ˌpɑːˈsiːjə/ pah-SEE-yuh) or chile negro is the dried form of the chilaca chili pepper, a long and narrow member of the species Capsicum annuum. Named for its dark, wrinkled skin (literally "little raisin"), it is a mild to hot, rich-flavored chile. As dried, it is generally 6 to 8 inches (15 to 20 cm) long and 1 to 1 1/2 inches (2.5 to 3.8 cm) in diameter.

The fresh narrow chilaca can measure up to 9 inches (230 mm) long and often has a twisted shape, which is rarely apparent after drying. It turns from dark green to dark brown when fully mature.

In the United States, producers and grocers sometimes incorrectly use "pasilla" to describe the poblano, a different, wider variety of pepper, the dried form of which is called an ancho if dried while green and a mulato if dried at maturity.

== Use ==
Pasilla are used especially in sauces. They are often combined with fruits and are excellent served with duck, seafood, lamb, mushrooms, garlic, fennel, honey, or oregano. They are sold whole or powdered in Mexico, the United States, and the United Kingdom.

Pasilla de Oaxaca is a variety of smoked pasilla chili from Oaxaca used in mole negro.

== See also ==
- Chipotle - The smoked and dried form of the jalapeño chili pepper.
- Guajillo - The dried form of the mirasol chili pepper.
- List of Capsicum cultivars
