= Papa rellena =

Traditional dish in South American cuisine

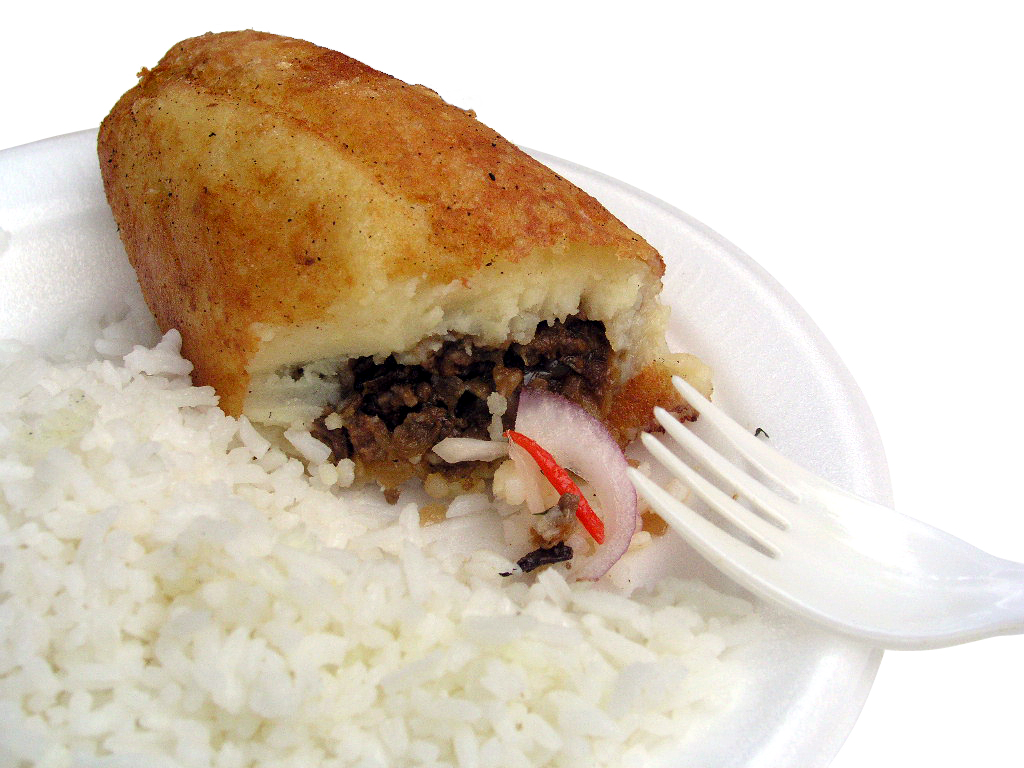
- Place of origin: Bolivia, Chile, Colombia, Cuba, Peru, Puerto Rico
- Region or state: Latin America
- Main ingredients: Potatoes, beef, onions, olives, hard boiled eggs, cumin, spices

Papas rellenas (English: stuffed potatoes) are a popular type of croquettes in Latin American regions such as Peru, Ecuador, Bolivia, Mexico, Chile, Colombia, and the Caribbean (more so in Puerto Rico and Cuba).

== Peruvian preparation ==
The dish is a potato-based dough into which a filling made of chopped beef and onions, whole olives, hard-boiled eggs, cumin and other herbs and spices is stuffed. Once prepared, the obloid mass is dredged in flour and deep-fried. Potato flour is often added to give greater consistency to the dough. In Peru, the dish is usually accompanied with salsa criolla, or an ají sauce.

== Caribbean variants ==
They consist of mashed potatoes stuffed with seasoned ground meat and various spices, and then deep-fried. The dish varies in preparation and presentation between countries. Papa rellena is a local favorite in heavily Cuban-populated American cities such as Miami and Tampa, in which the Cuban version consists of spherical potato balls stuffed with Cuban picadillo.

This dish is also extensively consumed in Puerto Rico, where it is called "relleno de papa". In Puerto Rico the potatoes are boiled and then mashed with cornstarch and seasoned. Papas rellenas are stuffed with cheese, picadillo, or a choice of meat. The papas rellenas are then coated with egg wash, and rolled into cornmeal or bread crumbs before frying.

== In popular culture ==
Papa rellena was featured on the Bolivian episode of Netflix TV series Street Food in season 2.

== See also ==
- List of stuffed dishes
- List of deep fried foods
- Quibe
- List of meat and potato dishes
