= Hufnagel =

Hufnagel (literally "hoof nail", metonymic occupational name for a farrier) is a surname. Notable people with the surname include:

- Charles A. Hufnagel (1916–1989), American surgeon
- Johann Siegfried Hufnagel (1724–1795), German parson
- John Hufnagel (born 1951), Canadian football player, coach, and executive
- Kevin Hufnagel, American musician
- Klaus Hufnagel (born 1955), East German track and field athlete
- Leon Hufnagel (1893–1933), Polish astrophysicist
- Tibor Hufnágel (born 1991), Hungarian sprint canoeist
- Yanni Hufnagel (born 1982), American college basketball coach

== See also ==
- Hufnagle
