= Picadillo =

Ground meat and tomato dish popular in Latin America and the Philippines

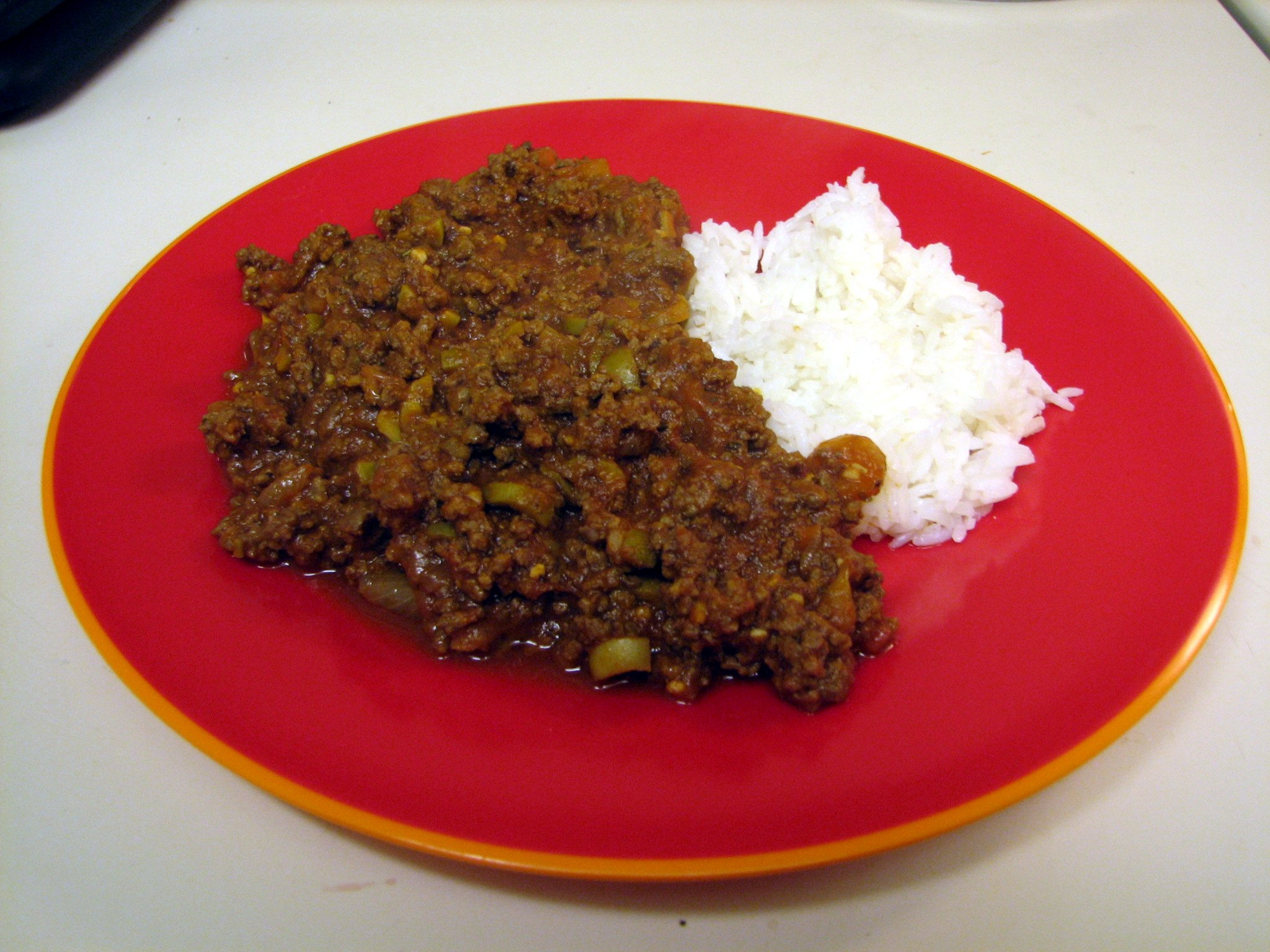
Picadillo served with rice

Picadillo (Spanish pronunciation: [pikaˈðiʝo], "mince") is a traditional dish in many Latin American countries including Mexico and Cuba, as well as the Philippines. It is made with ground meat (most commonly beef), tomatoes (tomato sauce may be used as a substitute), and also raisins, olives, and other ingredients that vary by region. The name comes from the Spanish word picar, meaning "to mince".

Picadillo can be eaten alone, though it is usually served with rice. It can also be used as a filling in tacos, empanadas, alcapurrias, and other savory pastries or croquettes. It can also be incorporated into other dishes, like pastelón (Dominican Republic and Puerto Rico), chiles en nogada (Mexico), and arroz a la cubana (Philippines).

== History ==
Although the dish was common in Hispanic cultures before the 19th century, a 19th-century recipe from California for pasteles a la argentina is given for a filled pastry with layers of beef picadillo and chicken cooked in a green chili and onion sauce with olive oil and raisins. "Picadillo" was not always made with beef; "picadillo de ave" was a minced fowl with white sauce. Pasteles de pollos y pichones (chicken and squab pastry) was made as a savory pie with alternating layers of chicken and squab with a picadillo of minced veal, bacon, ham fried in lard with onion, mushrooms, apples, artichokes, tomatoes, and a layer of seasonings.

== By region ==
=== Americas ===
==== Costa Rica ====
Costa Rican versions always include the name of the vegetable that represents the main ingredient to the dish (potato picadillo, ayote picadillo, etc.) and that is chopped and cooked with bell peppers, onions, stock, herbs and spices. It can include some type of protein but that is not essential. It is often served with tortillas or rice.

A variant of the Costa Rican picadillo, picadillo de platano verde, uses green plantains as the main ingredient.

==== Cuba ====
Cuban picadillo is made with ground beef and includes bell pepper or ají cachucha, onions, garlic, oregano, cumin, bay leaf, tomato sauce, olives, and capers, and is usually sauteed in olive oil and white wine. Raisins are a traditional ingredient, but are often omitted according to taste. Cuban picadillo is served over long grain white rice or used as a stuffing for papa rellena, empanadas, and pastelitos de carne (meat-filled puff pastries).

During the Special Period in the 1990s, a famine food variant of the Cuban picadillo emerged, in which the ground beef was substituted with plantain peels.

==== Dominican Republic ====
In the Dominican Republic, it includes cubanelle peppers, red onions, cilantro, garlic, tomato paste, and lippia, and may include olives, capers, raisins, and hard-boiled egg. It is served over rice or used as a filling for pasteles, empanadas, kibbeh, and cabbage rolls.

==== Mexico ====
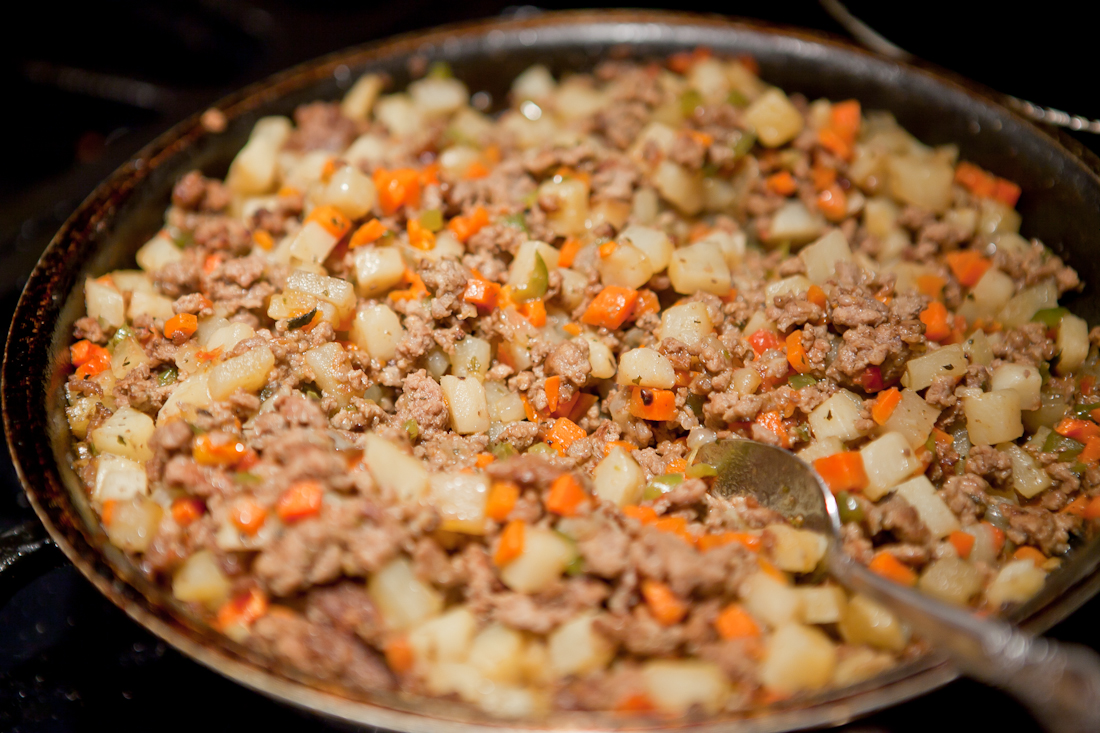
Mexican picadillo

In Mexico, beef picadillo is a classic antojito of the national cuisine. The most basic and popular set of ingredients of picadillo in Mexico are ground beef, carrots and potatoes, all cooked in a tomato sauce made from blended tomatoes, garlic and onion, usually seasoned with salt, pepper, and cumin but its preparation and ingredients can vary slightly from one region to another. For example, a Mexican picadillo can also include squash or peas. Mexican picadillo is typically eaten with tortillas, tostadas or tortilla chips and usually accompanied with rice or beans. It can be used as filling for chiles rellenos, chiles en nogada, tamales or gorditas. Pork is also a popular meat to use for picadillo in Mexico, as well as a mixture of pork and beef.

==== Peru ====
In Peru, it is used as a filling for empanadas, caigua rellenas as well as a main dish served with rice called arroz tapado. The ground meat is sauteed with garlic, hard boiled egg, raisins, olives, spices and herbs. Peruvian picadillo varies from family to family.

==== Puerto Rico ====
In Puerto Rico, it is used as a filling for empanadas, alcapurria, piononos and other fritters. It can also be served with rice and beans. The ground meat is sauteed with annatto, diced ham, oregano, bay leaf, recaito, tomato sauce and on occasion cumin, cheese, raisins, beans, sweet peas, olives, capers, diced potato, other spices and herbs. Puerto Rican picadillo varies from family to family.

=== Asia ===
==== Philippines ====
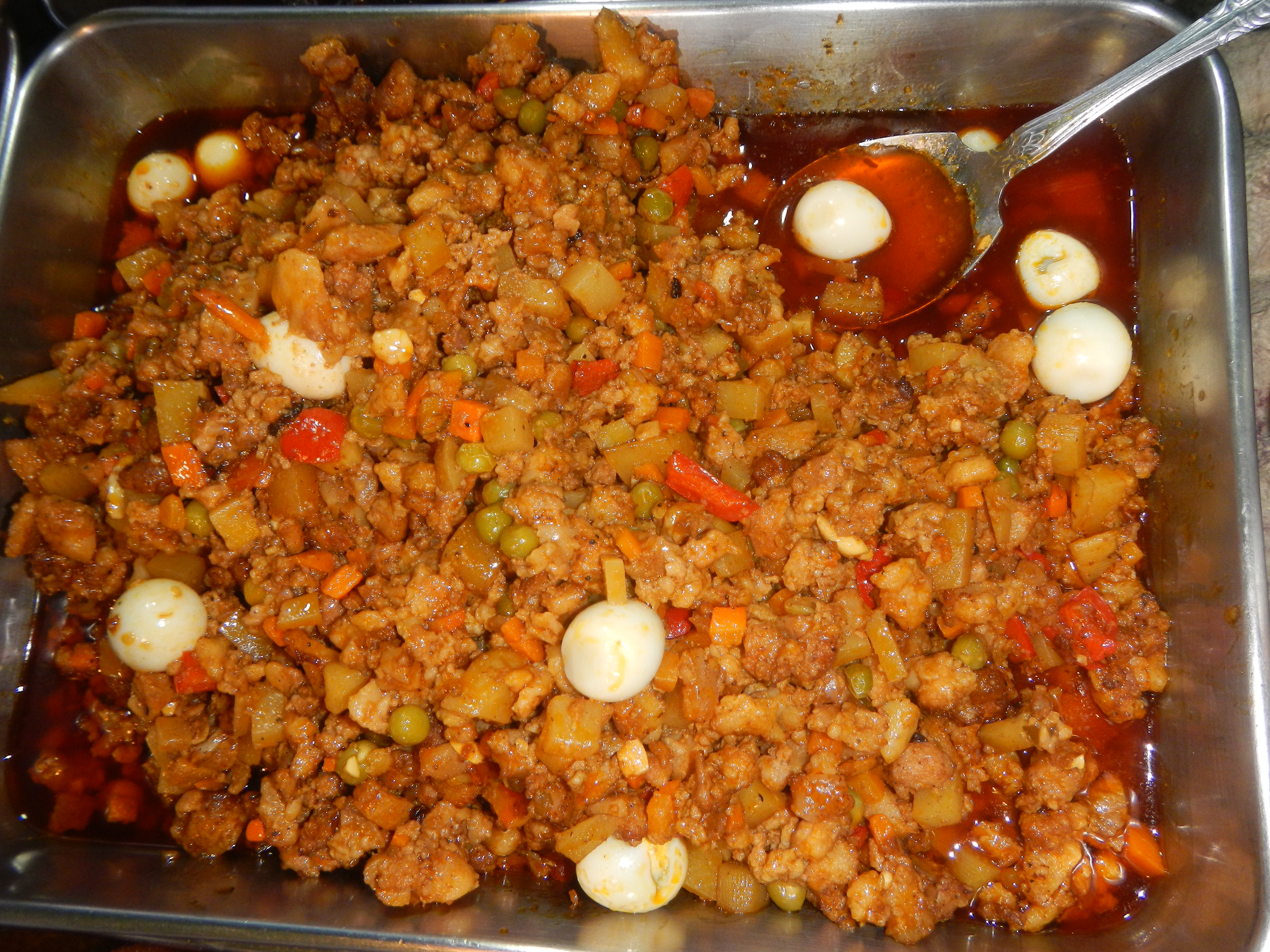
Philippine picadillo (also called giniling) with quail eggs

In the Philippines, picadillo is also known as giniling, which is Tagalog for "ground [meat]". Picadillo is cooked in two different ways. The version more commonly referred to as "picadillo" is a soupy stew made with ground or minced beef (also pork or sometimes, chicken), potatoes or chayote, green peas, carrots, onions, garlic, bell peppers, black pepper, and raisins in a tomato-based broth seasoned with patis (fish sauce), soy sauce, and sometimes chilis. Hard-boiled eggs (chicken or quail) are also commonly added, and it is eaten with white rice. It does not include olives or capers as in the Latin American version.

The second variant uses the same ingredients as the first version but is drier, like the Latin American version. This version is more widely known as giniling. Like the stew version, it is also usually eaten paired with white rice or is commonly used as stuffing, like for Filipino empanadas.

When served with white rice, sunny-side up eggs, and fried saba bananas, it becomes the Filipino version of the dish arroz a la cubana. Although in Filipino arroz a la cubana, the meat component can be made with just simple ground meat and peas in tomato sauce, not necessarily cooked picadillo-style. It differs from the Spanish version of arroz a la cubana which does not include ground beef at all.

== See also ==
- Sloppy Joe
- List of Mexican dishes
