= Guajillo chili =

Mexican chili pepper

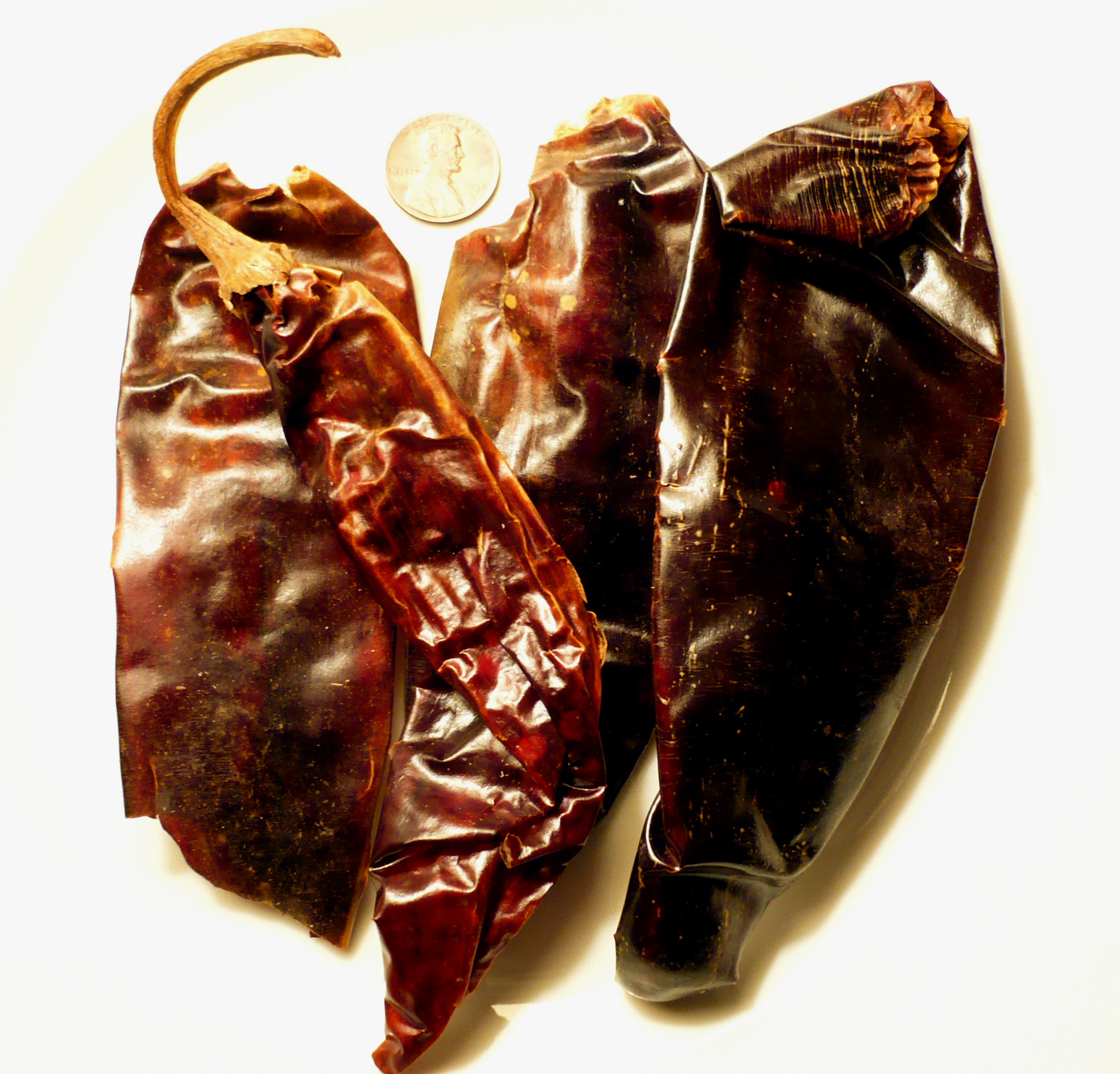
- Several dried guajillo chiles
- Species: Capsicum annuum
- Origin: Central America and Mexico
- Heat: Medium
- Scoville scale: 2,500–5,000 SHU

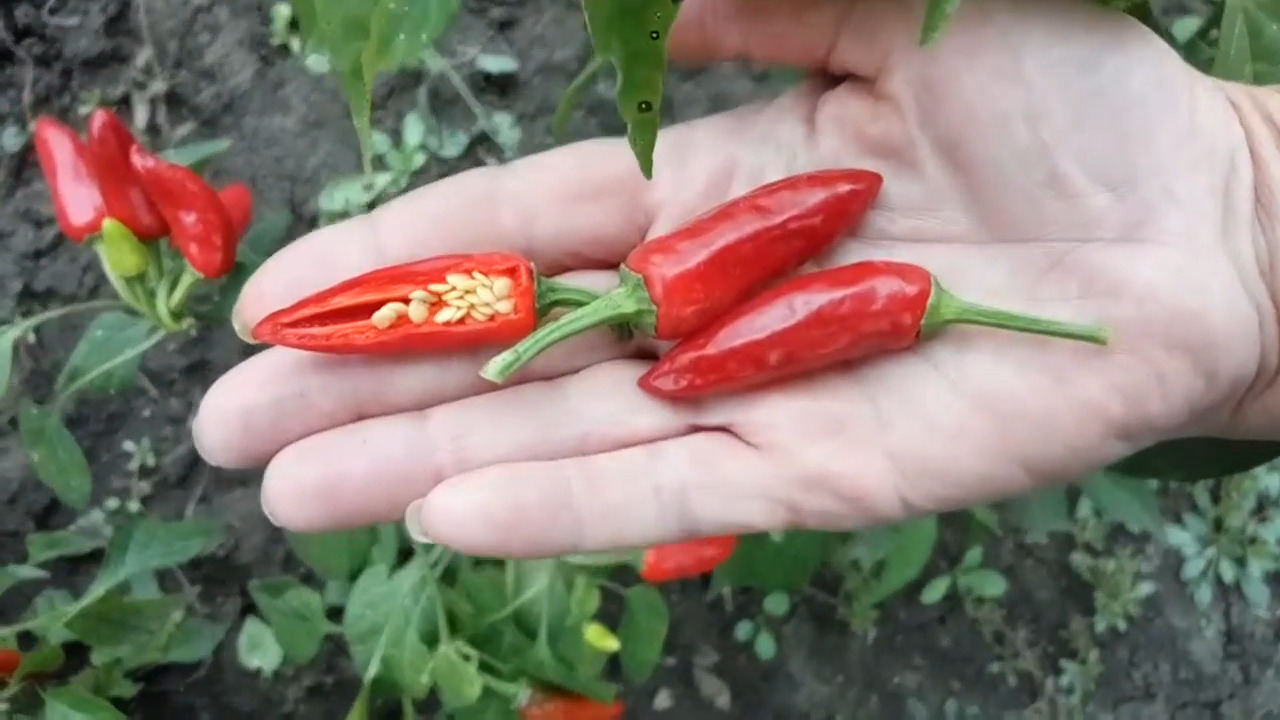
Fresh Mirasol pepper before drying into guajillo

A guajillo chili or guajillo chile or chile guaco (Spanish: chile guajillo) or mirasol chile is a landrace variety of the species Capsicum annuum with a mirasol ("sunflower" or "looking at the sun") chile fruit type. Mirasol is used to refer to the fresh pepper, and the term guajillo is used for the dry form, which is the second-most common dried chili in Mexican cuisine. The Mexican state of Zacatecas is one of the main producers of guajillo chilies. There are two main varieties that are distinguished by their size and heat factors. The guajillo puya is the smaller and hotter of the two (puyar, in Spanish, is to prick or poke). In contrast, the longer and wider guajillo has a more pronounced, richer flavor and is somewhat less spicy. With a rating of 2,500 to 5,000 on the Scoville scale, its heat is considered mild to medium.

Guajillo chilies have many applications and are used in a variety of Mexican preparations. For instance, they are sometimes used to make salsa (e.g. mole) for tamales; the dried fruits are seeded, soaked or simmered, then pulverized, mashed or pureed into a paste, then cooked with several other ingredients to produce a flavorful sauce.

Guajillo chilies are used in marinades, salsas, pastes, butters and spice rubs to flavor meats, fat and oil with other ingredients. The guajillo chili, with its more delicate flavor, is used with fish and chicken, or added to salsa as a side dish.

Some Mexican dishes where guajillo chiles are a main ingredient include:

- Chilate or mole de olla
- Pambazos
- Consomés
- Carne adobada

== Description ==
The guajillo chile has a reddish-brown, rather dark color and a thin, smooth, shiny skin. It is about 8–10 cm (3.1–3.9 in) long. In terms of flavor, it is generally defined as sweet and somewhat fruity. Pungency varies widely from 2,000 SHU, i.e., mildly hot, to 15,000 SHU, i.e., moderately hot.

== See also ==
- Chipotle - The smoked and dried form of the jalapeño chili pepper.
- Pasilla - The dried form of the chilaca chili pepper.
- List of smoked foods
