= Jalapeño popper =

Breaded, fried, stuffed jalapeño pepper

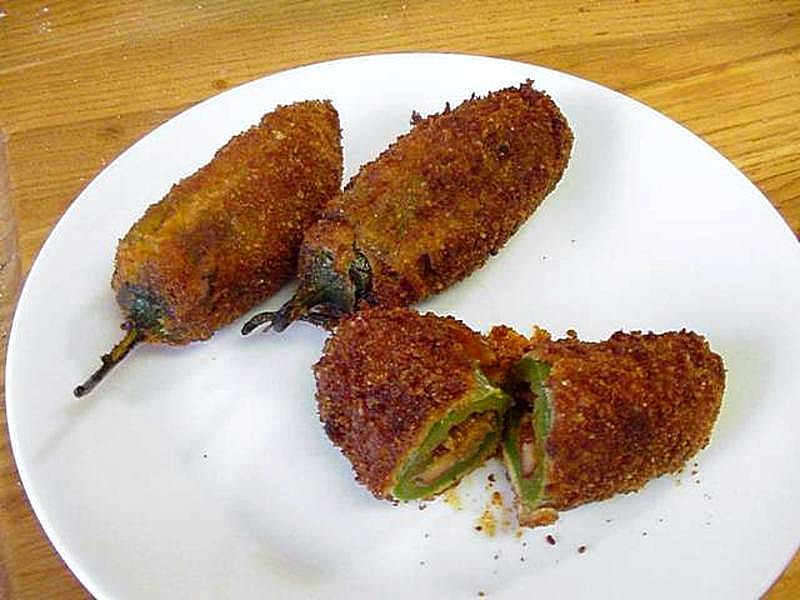
- Course: Hors d'oeuvre
- Place of origin: United States
- Main ingredients: Jalapeño peppers, cheese, spices, breading, sometimes ground meat

Jalapeño poppers, or jalapeño bites, are jalapeño peppers that have been hollowed out, stuffed with a mixture of cheese, spices, and sometimes ground meat, and breaded and deep-fried or wrapped with bacon and baked. They are a common dish on appetizer menus in chain restaurants in the United States.

They are sometimes called armadillo eggs, especially if wrapped in bacon or sausage meat to give the appearance of an armadillo shell. The term has been used since around 1972 in Texas, antedating the trademark on "Jalapeño Poppers". As chile relleno can be made with jalapeño, the jalapeño popper is probably a Tex-Mex version of that dish. The name armadillo eggs likely comes from the perceived similarity to Scotch eggs.

When smoked or grilled and stuffed with sausage, they are also referred to as A.B.T or Atomic Buffalo Turds.

Joey Chestnut holds the Major League Eating record for jalapeño poppers, eating 118 in 10 minutes at the University of Arizona on 8 April 2006.

== Trademark ==
On April 30, 1992, Anchor Food Products applied for and later received a trademark on "Jalapeño Poppers"; on "Jalapeño Poppers" used for "processed vegetables" however, the word "Poppers" had been trademarked in 1983 by the Poppers Supply Company of Portland, Oregon, for use with popcorn. On September 27, 1993, the Poppers Supply Company successfully applied for a trademark on "Poppers" when used for "coated and breaded vegetable pieces", which they held until the trademark was transferred to Anchor Food Products on September 12, 2001.

On September 25, 2001, Heinz announced that it had completed the acquisition of the Poppers brand, while McCain Foods acquired Anchor's production facilities.

Leon's Texas Cuisine launched a line of cheese-stuffed, breaded, fried jalapeño product in 1985 called Jalitos; the company claims it is the original such product that was nationally distributed.

== See also ==
- Chile relleno
- Bhaji
- Dinamita
- List of deep fried foods
- List of hors d'oeuvre
- List of stuffed dishes
