= Chiles en nogada =

Stuffed pepper dish with walnut cream sauce

Chile en nogada
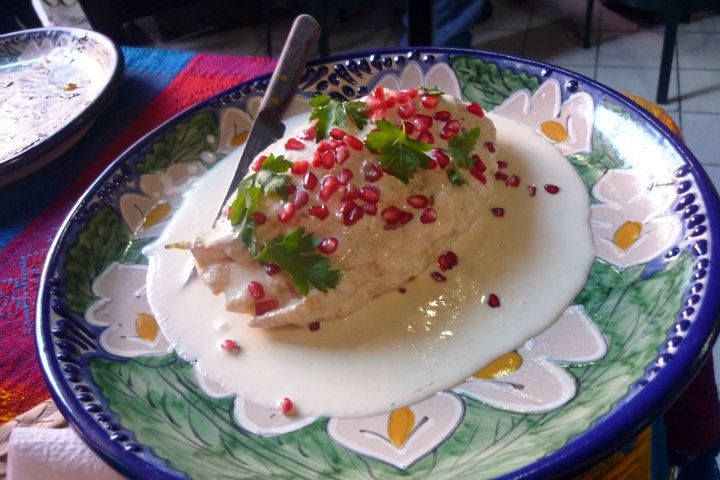
- Chile en nogada prepared for serving
- Type: Stuffed vegetable
- Course: Main
- Place of origin: Mexico (1821)
- Region or state: Puebla
- Serving temperature: Room temperature
- Main ingredients: poblano chile, picadillo, walnuts, cream, pomegranate

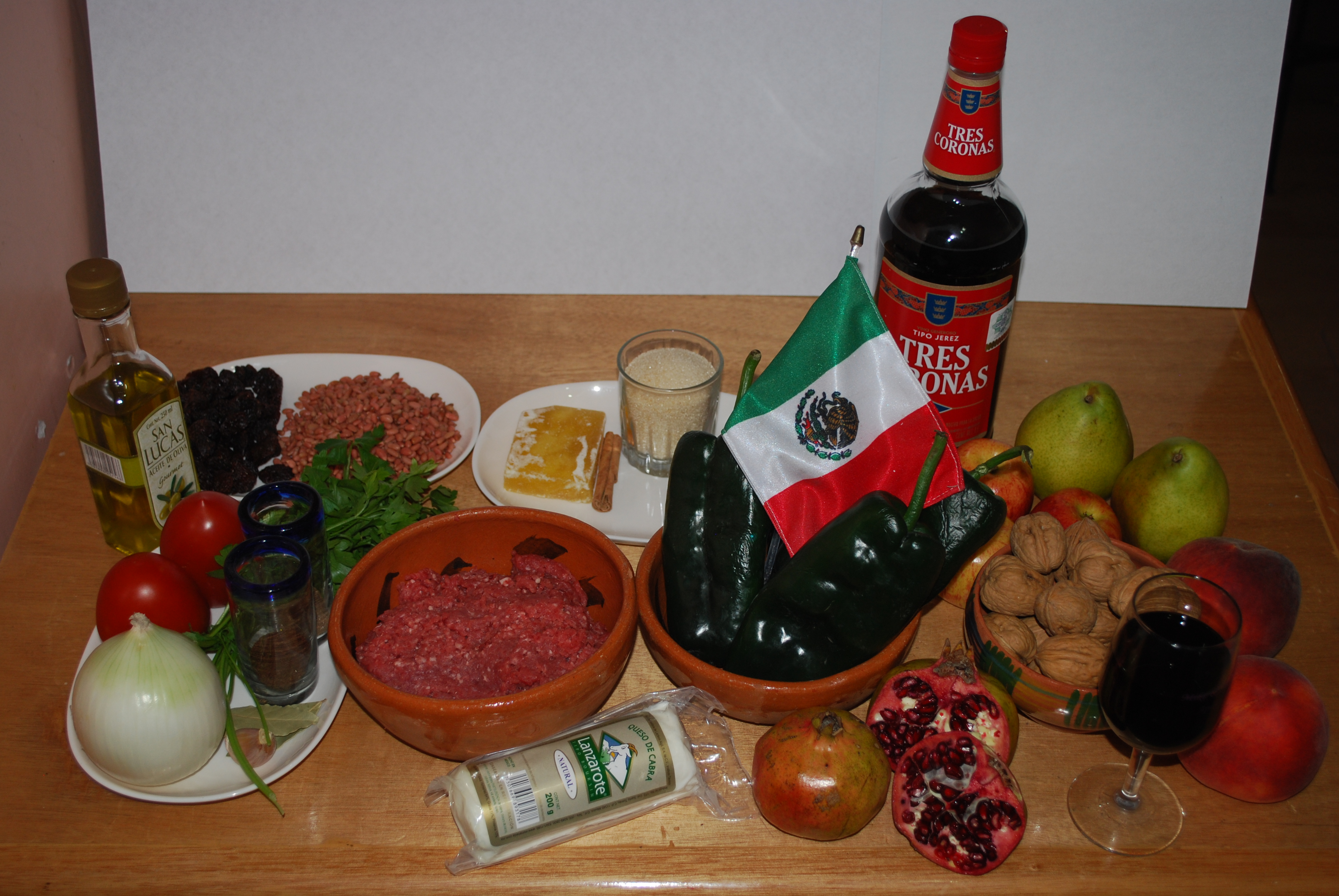
Ingredients for the preparation of the dish

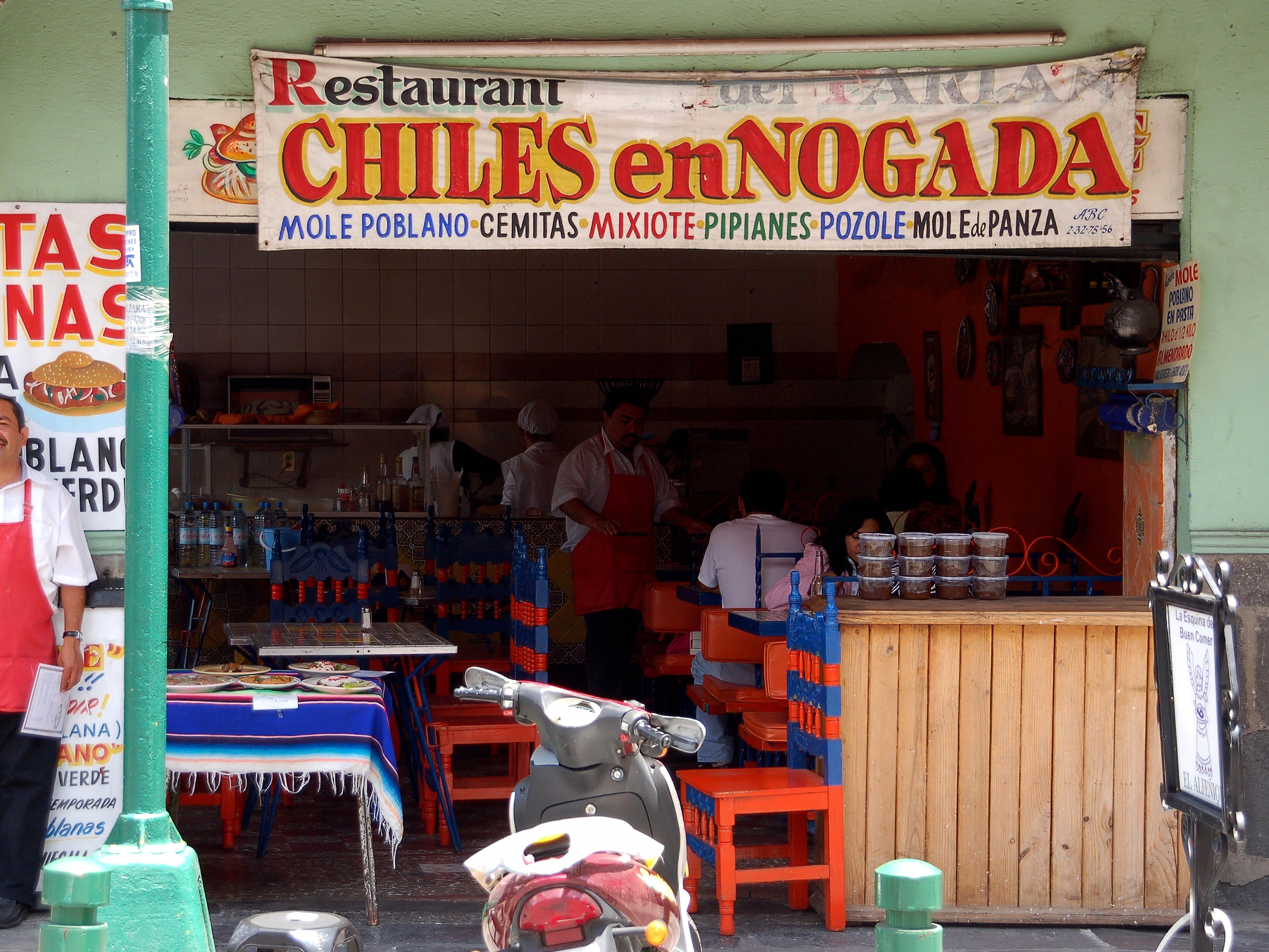
Restaurant in Puebla

Chiles en nogada is a Mexican dish of poblano chiles stuffed with picadillo (a mixture usually containing minced meat, aromatics, fruits and spices) topped with a walnut-based cream sauce called nogada, pomegranate seeds and parsley; it is typically served at room temperature. It is widely considered a national dish of Mexico.

The picadillo usually contains panochera apple (manzana panochera), sweet-milk pear (pera de leche) and criollo peach (durazno criollo). The cream sauce usually has milk, double cream, fresh cheese, sherry and walnut. The walnuts, which give the nogada sauce its name (nogal being Spanish for "walnut tree") are traditionally of the cultivar nogal de Castilla (Castilian walnut). In some cases, pecans may substitute for or supplement the walnuts.

This dish is made in Central Mexico in August and the first half of September, when pomegranates are in season. The colors of the dish—green chile, white sauce, red pomegranate—are the colors of the flag of Mexico, and Independence Day is during the pomegranate season.

== History ==
The traditional chile en nogada is from Puebla; it is tied to Mexican independence since it is said they were prepared for the first time to entertain the future emperor Agustín de Iturbide when he came to the city after the signing of the Treaty of Córdoba. This dish is a source of pride for the inhabitants of the state of Puebla.

Some Mexican historians think the inventors of this dish were the Monjas Clarisas, although others think they were the Madres Contemplativas Agustinas of the convent of Santa Mónica, Puebla.

== See also ==
- Chile relleno
- Stuffed peppers
