= Bill Hufnagle =

American motorcyclist and cookbook writer

Bill Hufnagle, who writes and performs as Biker Billy, is an American motorcyclist, cookbook author and television personality.

== Life and career ==
Originally from The Bronx, he resides (or has resided) in Asheville, North Carolina; and Madison, New Jersey.

He was food editor for Cruising Rider magazine, and has been featured in Entertainment Weekly, Vanity Fair and Vegetarian Times. He has also appeared on television as a guest on The Tonight Show with Jay Leno, Good Morning America and CNN. He has been sponsored by Harley-Davidson to exhibit at Daytona Bike Week, and has been a featured exhibitor at other local motorcycle rallies.

He hosted a syndicated public-access cable television show, Biker Billy Cooks With Fire, for six years; the show was featured in Guggenheim Museum's 100 Years of Motorcycle in Film companion to The Art of the Motorcycle exhibition.

A variety of jalapeño pepper was named for him by the Burpee Seed Company.

Hufnagle is a vegetarian.

== Awards ==
- National Coalition of Motorcyclists 1998 Media Award (Harvard Press)
- American Motorcyclist Association 1999 Most Valued Person award(Harvard Press)

== Bibliography ==
- Bill Hufnagle (1995). Biker Billy Cooks With Fire. Morrow Cookbooks. ISBN 0688140637.
- Bill Hufnagle (2000). Biker Billy's Freeway-A-Fire Cookbook: Life's Too Short to Eat Dull Food. Morrow Cookbooks. ISBN 0688168221.
- Bill Hufnagle (2003). Biker Billy's Hog Wild on a Harley Cookbook: 200 Fiercely Flavorful Recipes to Kick-Start Your Home Cooking From Harley Riders Across the USA. Harvard Common Press. ISBN 1558322507.
- Bill Hufnagle (2008). Biker Billy's Roadhouse Cookbook: Adventures in Roadside Cuisine. Lyons Press. ISBN 978-1599214344.
