= Leon Hufnagel =

Leon Hufnagel (1893 – 19 February 1933) was a Polish astrophysicist who examined celestial mechanics. His studies were on the perturbations of asteroids and on the velocities of star movement.

Hufnagel was educated at Warsaw and Vienna, studying under Samuel Oppenheim before working at the University of Warsaw. He took an interest in Arthur Eddington's work on star motion. He examined stellar velocities from 1926 at Lund and travelled around observatories in the United States as a Rockefeller Travelling Fellow. He was elected Fellow of the Royal Astronomical Society in 1929. Along with Emanuel von der Pahlen and Friedrich Gondolatsch he compiled a Lehrbuch der Stellarstatistik (1937).
