= Mulato pepper =

Type of poblano pepper

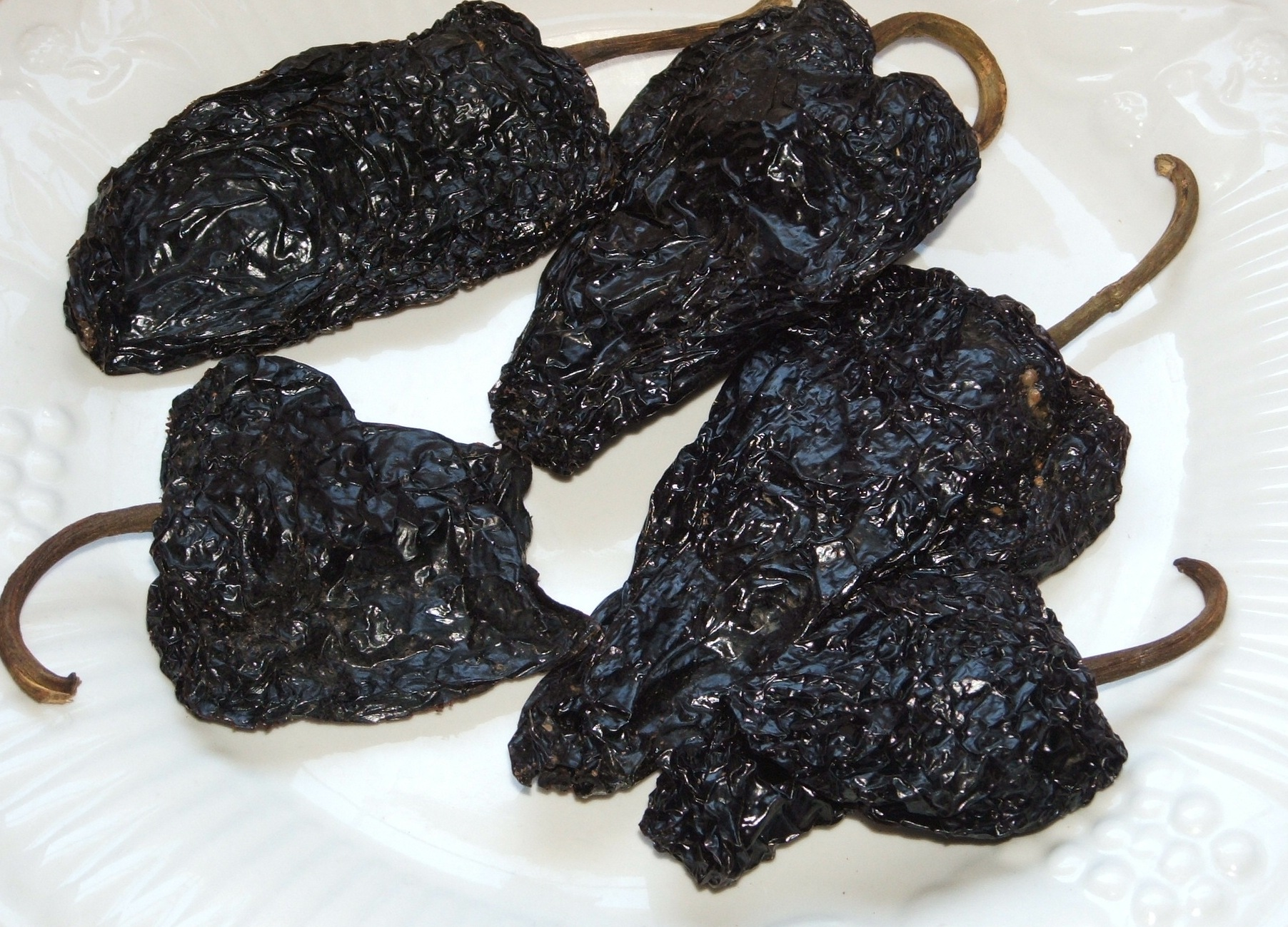
- Mulato pepper pods (dried)
- Species: Capsicum annuum
- Cultivar: mulato
- Origin: Mexico
- Heat: Low
- Scoville scale: 2,500 - 3,000 SHU

The mulato pepper is the dried form of a variety of the poblano pepper. Mulatos are poblanos that ripen to a dark brown when fully mature. Other poblano varieties ripen to a red color, are harvested somewhat earlier, and when dried are called ancho peppers.

The mulato is flat and wrinkled, and is always brownish-black in color. The average length and width of the mulato are 10 cm and 5 cm, respectively. Its shape is wide at the top, tapering to a blunt point.

The mulato has been described as tasting somewhat like chocolate or licorice, with undertones of cherry and tobacco. Its heat rating is 2,500 to 3,000 on the Scoville scale.
