= Poblano =

Mild chili pepper originating in Puebla, Mexico

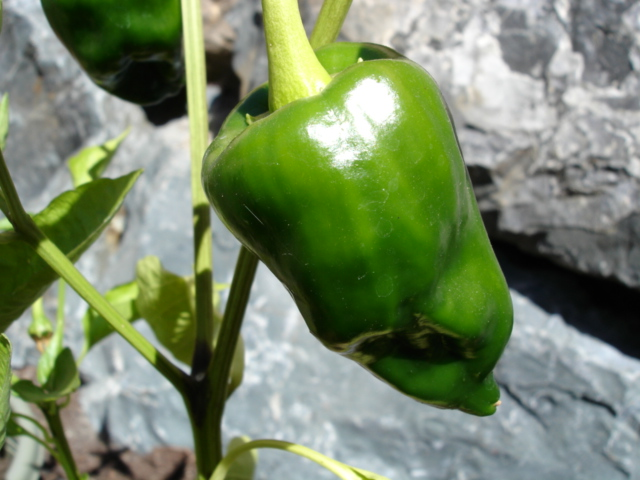
- Poblano pepper
- Species: Capsicum annuum
- Origin: Puebla, Mexico
- Heat: Low
- Scoville scale: 1,000–1,500 SHU

The poblano (Capsicum annuum) is a mild chili pepper originating in Puebla, Mexico. Dried, it is called ancho or chile ancho, from the Spanish word ancho (wide). Stuffed fresh and roasted, it is popular in chiles rellenos poblanos.

While poblanos tend to have a mild flavor, occasionally and unpredictably they can have significant heat. Different peppers from the same plant have been reported to vary substantially in heat intensity. The ripened red poblano is significantly hotter and more flavorful than the less ripe, green poblano.

A closely related variety is the mulato, which is darker in color, sweeter in flavor, and softer in texture. The pasilla pepper is sometimes incorrectly called "poblano", particularly in the United States, but they are distinct from true poblano peppers.

== Growth ==
The bush has multiple stems and can reach 25 in (64 cm) in height. The fruit is 3 to 6 in (7.6 to 15 cm) long and 2 to 3 in (5 to 8 cm) wide. An immature poblano is dark purplish green in color, but the mature fruits eventually turn a red so dark as to be nearly black.

Poblanos grow in hardiness zones 10–12 and do best with a soil pH between 7.0 and 8.5. They typically prefer full sunlight and may require additional support for the growing fruits during harvest in late summer. A poblano takes around 200 days from seed to harvest and requires soil temperatures of at least 64 °F (18 °C) to germinate.

== Use ==
Preparation methods include: dried, stuffed, in mole sauces, or coated in whipped egg (capeado) and fried. It is particularly popular during the Mexican independence festivities as part of a dish called chiles en nogada, which incorporates green, white, and red ingredients corresponding to the colors of the Mexican flag. This may be considered one of Mexico's most symbolic dishes by its nationals. It is also usually used in the widely found dish chile relleno. Poblanos are popular in the United States and can be found in grocery stores in the states bordering Mexico and in urban areas.

After being roasted and peeled (which improves the texture by removing the waxy skin), poblano peppers are preserved by either canning or freezing. Storing them in airtight containers keeps them for several months. When dried, the poblano becomes a broad, flat, heart-shaped pod called a chile ancho (literally "wide chile" or "broad chile"). These dried ancho chiles are often ground into a powder used as flavoring in various dishes.

"Poblano" is also the word for an inhabitant of Puebla, and mole poblano refers to the spicy chocolate chili sauce originating in Puebla.

== Gallery ==
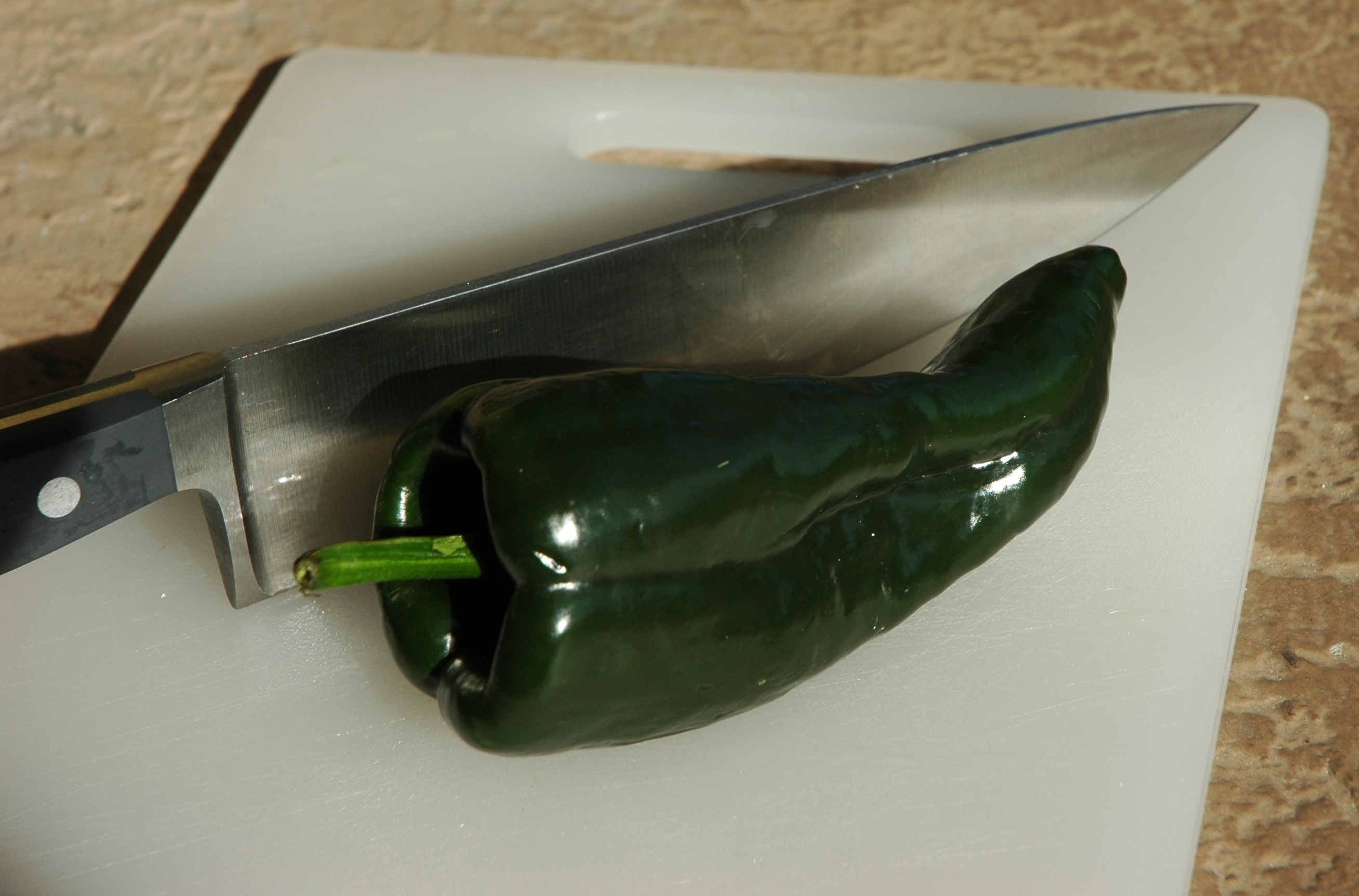
A fresh poblano chile

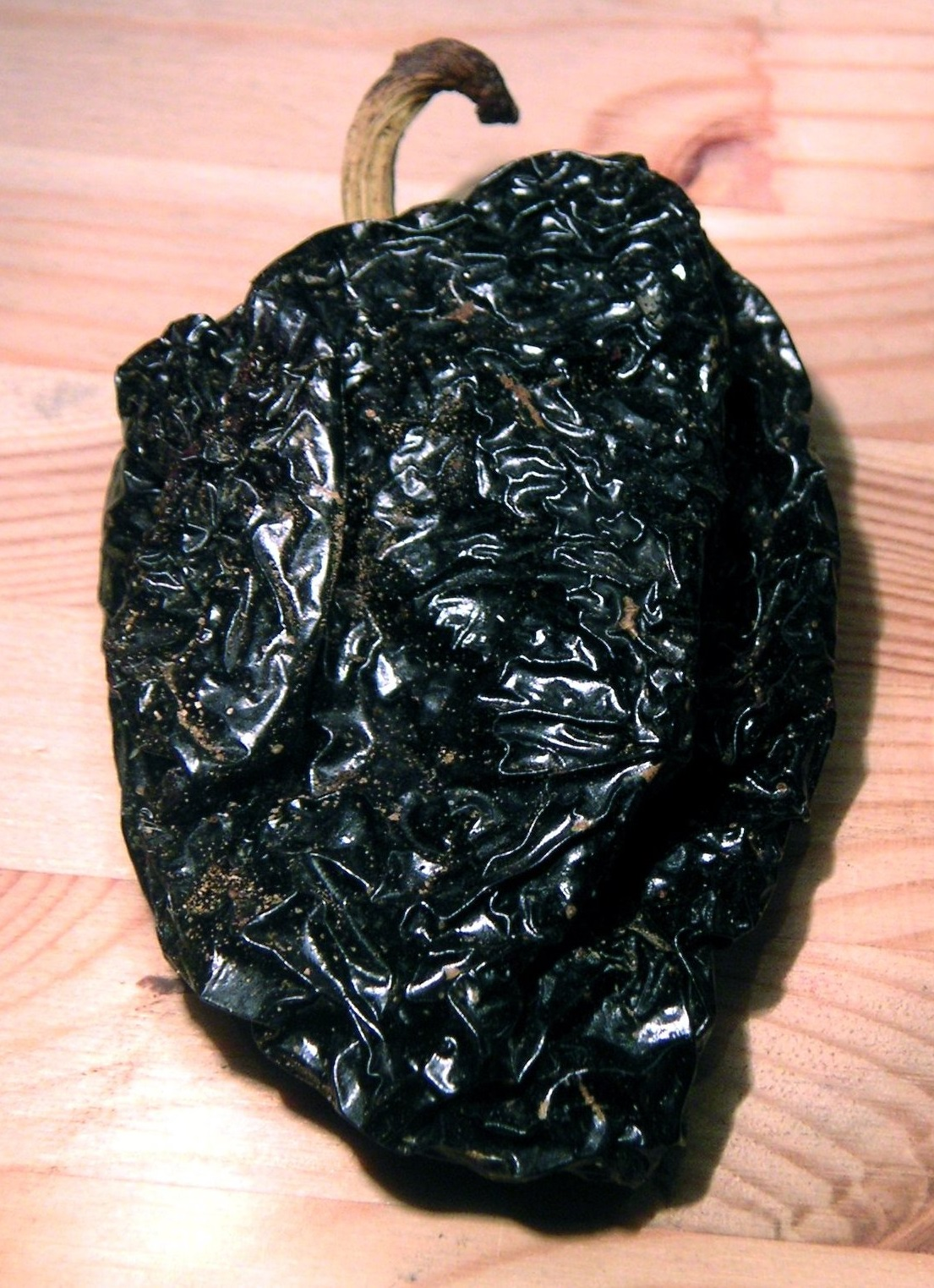
A dried poblano is called a "chile ancho"

== See also ==
- List of Capsicum cultivars
