= Jalapeño =

Hot pepper

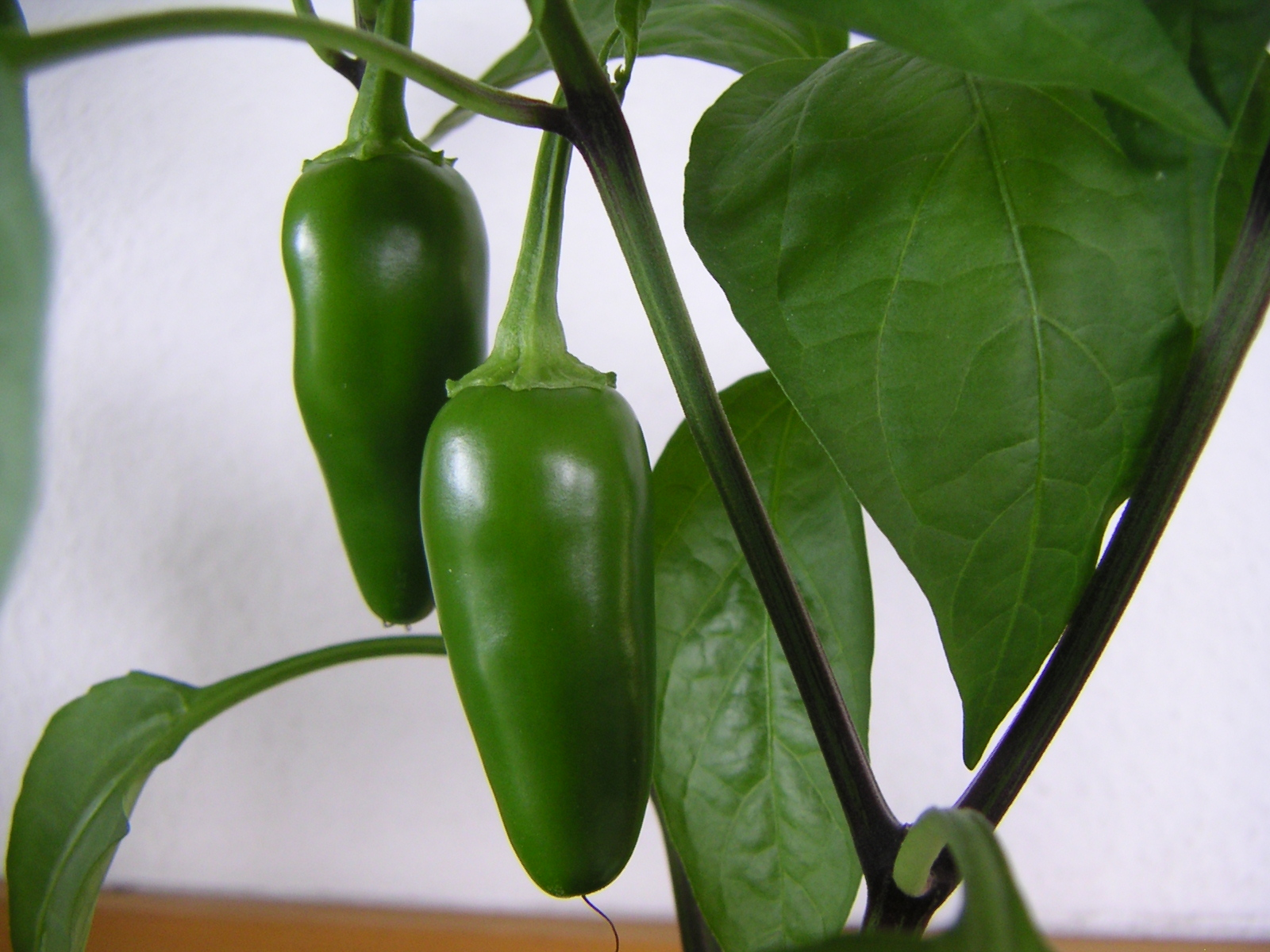
- Immature jalapeños still on the plant
- Species: Capsicum annuum
- Cultivar: Jalapeño
- Origin: Mexico
- Heat: Medium
- Scoville scale: 4,000 to 8,500 SHU

The jalapeño (/ˌhæləˈpiːnjoʊ, ˌhɑːl-, -ˈpeɪ-/ HA(H)L-ə-PEE-nyoh, -PAY-, Spanish: [xalaˈpeɲo]) is a medium-sized chili pepper pod type cultivar of the species Capsicum annuum. A mature jalapeño chili is 5–10 cm (2–4 in) long and 25–38 mm (1–1 1/2 in) wide, and hangs down from the plant. The pungency of jalapeño peppers varies, but is usually between 4,000 and 8,500 units on the Scoville scale. Commonly picked and consumed while still green, it is occasionally allowed to fully ripen and turn red, orange, or yellow. It is wider and generally milder than the similar Serrano pepper.

== History and etymology ==
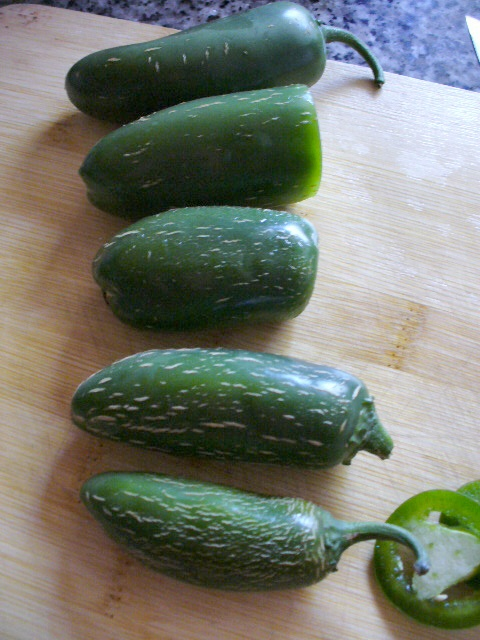
Five (5) Jalapeño peppers

The jalapeño is variously named huachinango, for the ripe red jalapeño, and chile gordo (meaning "fat chili pepper") also known as cuaresmeño.

The name jalapeño is Spanish for "from Xalapa", the capital city of Veracruz, Mexico. Contrary to popular belief, the jalapeño pepper is not grown in or around Xalapa, but Vicente Jiménez invented the process of pickling and canning the peppers in Xalapa.

Genetic analysis of Capsicum annuum places jalapeños as a distinct genetic clade with no close sisters that are not directly derived from jalapeños. Jalapeños were in use by the Aztecs prior to the Spanish conquest; Bernardino de Sahagún in the Florentine Codex writes of Aztec markets selling chipotles (smoked jalapeños) and mole made from chipotles, besides the sale of fresh chilies. The use of peppers in the Americas dates back thousands of years, including the practice of smoking some varieties of peppers in order to preserve them; further well preserved samples and genetic testing would be needed to determine the usage and existence of the jalapeño clade and pod type in the past.

== Cultivation ==
In 1999, roughly 43,000 hectares (107,000 acres) of land in Mexico was dedicated to jalapeño production; as of 2011, that had decreased to 41,000 hectares (101,000 acres). Jalapeños account for thirty percent of Mexico's chili production, and while the total land area used for cultivation has decreased, there has been a 1.5% increase in volume yield per year in Mexico due to increasing irrigation, use of greenhouses, better equipment, knowledge, and improved techniques. Because of this, in 2009, 619,000 tons of jalapeños were produced with 42% of the crop coming from Chihuahua, 12.9% from Sinaloa, 6.6% from Jalisco, and 6.3% from Michoacán. La Costeña controls about 60% of the world market and, according to company published figures, exports 16% of the peppers that Mexico produces, an 80% share of the 20% that Mexico exports in total. The US imports 98% of La Costeña's exports.

According to the USDA, since 2010 California produces the most jalapeños, followed by New Mexico and Texas — a total of 209,800 tonnes (462.5 million pounds) of peppers in 2014. It is difficult to get accurate statistics on chilies and specific chilies as growers are not fond of keeping and sharing such data and reporting agencies often lump all green chilies together, or all hot chilies, with no separation of pod type. In New Mexico in 2002 the crop of jalapeños were worth $3 million at the farm gate and $20 million after processing. China, Peru, Spain, and India also produce commercial chilies, including jalapeños.

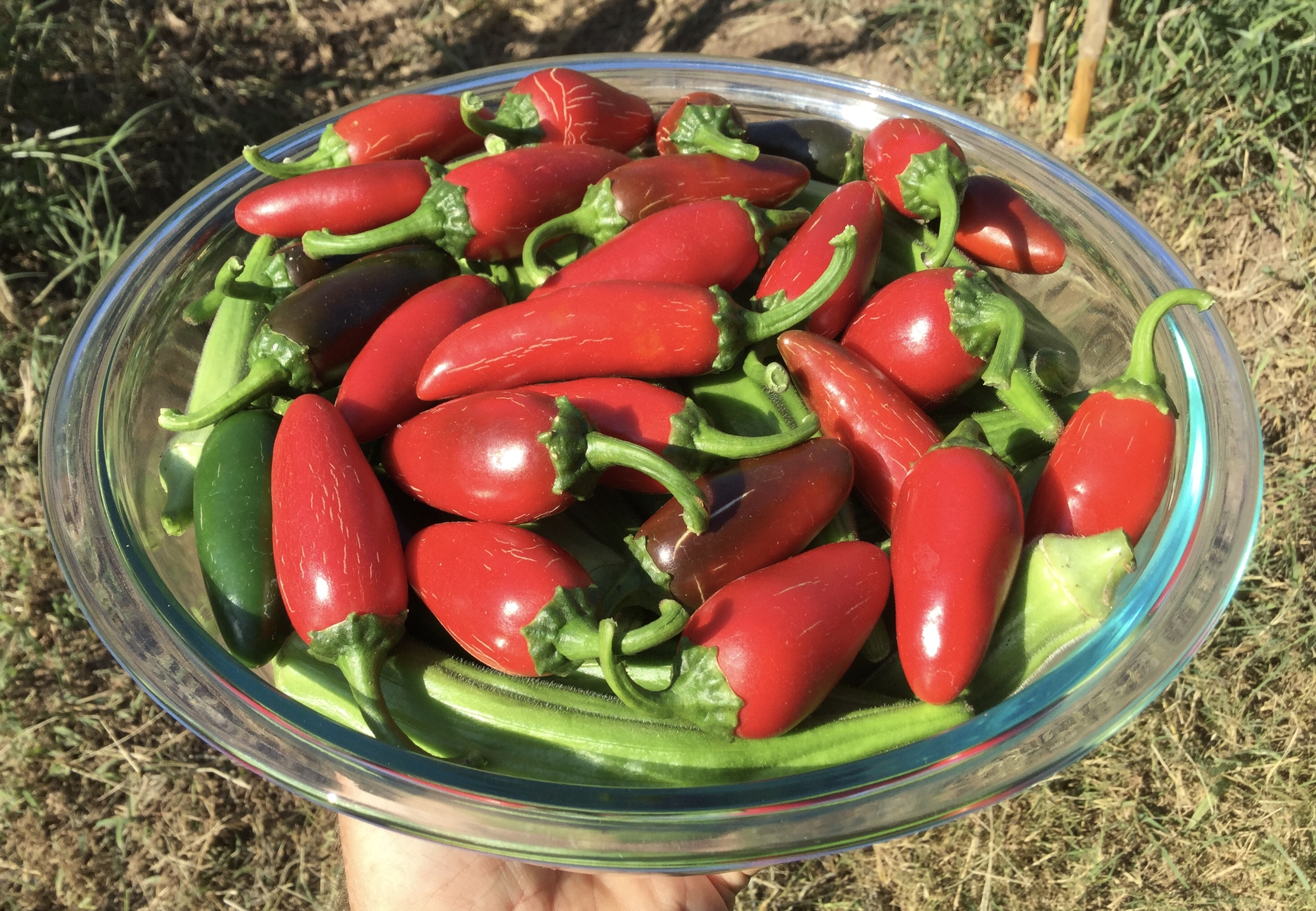
Jalapeños grown in an Oklahoma garden. Red jalapeños are used to make sriracha sauce.

Jalapeños are a pod type of Capsicum annuum. The growing period is 70–80 days. When mature, the plant stands 70–90 cm (2 ft 4 in – 2 ft 11 in) tall. Typically, a plant produces 25 to 35 pods. During a growing period, a plant will be picked multiple times. As the growing season ends, the peppers turn red, as seen in sriracha sauce. Jalapeños thrive in a number of soil types and temperatures, though they prefer warmer climates, provided they have adequate water. The optimum temperature for seed germination is 29 °C (84 °F), with degradation of germination seen above 30 °C (86 °F) and little to no germination occurring at 40 °C (104 °F); at 29 °C (84 °F) the time to 50% germination rate depends on cultivar and seed lot but was tested as being between 4 and 5 days, which is shorter than cayenne. A pH of 4.5 to 7.0 is preferred for growing jalapeños, and well-drained soil is essential for healthy plants. Jalapeños need at least 6 to 8 hours of sunlight per day. Experiments show that unlike bell peppers at least 7.5 millimolar (mM) nitrogen is needed for optimal pod production, and 15 to 22 mM nitrogen produces the best result: the plant produces both more leaves and more pods, rather than just more leaves. Once picked, individual peppers may turn to red of their own accord. The peppers can be eaten green or red. Though usually grown as an annual they are perennial and if protected from frost can produce during multiple years, as with all Capsicum annuum.

Jalapeños are subject to root rot and foliar blight, both often caused by Phytophthora capsici; over-watering worsens the condition as the fungus grows best in warm wet environments. Crop rotation can help, and resistant strains of jalapeño, such as the 'NuMex Vaquero' and 'TAM Mild Jalapeño', have been and are being bred as this is of major commercial impact throughout the world. As jalapeños are a cultivar, the diseases are common to Capsicum annuum: Verticillium wilt, Cercospora capsici, Powdery mildew, Colletotrichum capsici (Ripe Rot), Erwinia carotovora (Soft Rot), Beet curly top virus, Tospovirus (Tomato spotted wilt virus), Pepper mottle virus, Tobacco mosaic virus, Pepper Geminiviridae, and Root-knot nematode being among the major commercially important diseases.

After harvest, if jalapeños are stored at 7.5 °C (45.5 °F) they have a shelf life of up to 3–5 weeks. Jalapeños produce 0.1–0.2 μL per kg per hour of ethylene, very low for chilies, and do not respond to ethylene treatment. Holding jalapeños at 20–25 °C and high humidity can be used to complete the ripening of picked jalapeños. A hot water dip of 55 °C (131 °F) for 4 minutes is used to kill off molds that may exist on the picked peppers without damaging them. The majority of jalapeños are wet processed, canned, or pickled on harvesting for use in mixes, prepared food products, and salsas.

=== Hybrids and sub-cultivars ===
There are a wide variety of breeds for consumer and commercial use of jalapeño plants. The majority fall under one of four categories: F1 hybrids, where the parent plants have been hand-emasculated and cross-bred to produce uniform offspring with hybrid vigor; cultivars which are F-11 or F-12 hybrids or later generations where a stable unique population has been developed; landraces; and F2 hybrids.

F1 hybrids produce the highest and most uniform yields but cost 25 times the cost of open-pollinated seed, leading to only 2% of the farmland dedicated to jalapeño cultivation in the United States being planted with F1 hybrids. F2 hybrids often produce similarly to F1 hybrids; however, some F1 hybrids are produced via recessive male sterility to eliminate the need to hand-pollinate, reducing the cost to produce the hybrid, but producing a 25% reduction in yield in the F2 generation. Some notable F1 hybrids are 'Mitla', 'Perfecto', 'Tula', 'Grande' (a hot jalapeño), 'Sayula', 'Senorita', and 'Torreon', most of them being developed and marketed by Petoseed, a brand of Seminis.

Cultivars are researched and created to promote desirable traits. Common traits selected for are resistance to viruses and other pepper-related diseases, milder peppers, early ripening, more attractive fruit in terms of size, wall thickness, and corking, and higher yields. The land-grant universities and the Chile Pepper Institute promote the use of cultivars as the most sustainable and environmentally safe disease control method both in terms of economics and long-term environmental perspective. Notable cultivars include 'Early Jalapeño', 'TAM Mild Jalapeño', 'TAM Mild Jalapeño II', 'TAM Veracruz', the yellow 'TAM Jaloro', 'NuMex Vaquero', the colorful 'NuMex Piñata', 'TAM Dulcito', 'Waialua', Biker Billy and 'NuMex Primavera'. Sweet hybridized varieties have been created with no "heat", although they retain the appearace and flavor of a jalapeño.

== Eating characteristics ==
=== Nutrients ===
Peppers, jalapeño, raw
Nutritional value per 100 g (3.5 oz)
- Energy: 121.3 kJ (29.0 kcal)
- Carbohydrates: 6.50 g
- Sugars: 4.12 g
- Dietary fiber: 2.8 g
- Fat: 0.37 g
- Protein: 0.91 g
Vitamins and minerals
Vitamins	Quantity %DV^{†}
Vitamin A equiv.	6% 54 μg
Thiamine (B1)	3% 0.040 mg
Riboflavin (B2)	5% 0.070 mg
Niacin (B3)	8% 1.28 mg
Vitamin B6	25% 0.42 mg
Folate (B9)	7% 27 μg
Vitamin C	132% 118.6 mg
Vitamin E	24% 3.58 mg
Vitamin K	15% 18.5 μg
Minerals	Quantity %DV^{†}
Calcium	1% 12 mg
Iron	1% 0.25 mg
Magnesium	4% 15 mg
Phosphorus	2% 26 mg
Potassium	8% 248 mg
Sodium	0% 3 mg
Zinc	1% 0.14 mg
- Other constituents: Quantity
- Water: 91.69 g
- Capsaicin: 0.01g – 6 g
- link to USDA Database entry
- ^{†}Percentages estimated using US recommendations for adults, except for potassium, which is estimated based on expert recommendation from the National Academies.

A raw jalapeño is 92% water, 6% carbohydrates, 1% protein, and contains negligible fat (table). A 100-gram (3 1/2 oz) reference serving of raw jalapeños provides 120 kilojoules (29 kcal) of food energy, and is a rich source (20% or more of the Daily Value, DV) of vitamin C, vitamin B6, and vitamin E, with vitamin K in a moderate amount (table). Other micronutrients are low in content (table).

=== Scoville heat units ===
Compared with other chillies, the jalapeño heat level varies from mild to hot depending on cultivation and preparation and can have from a few thousand to over 10,000 Scoville heat units. The number of scars on the pepper, which appear as small brown lines, called 'corking', has a positive correlation with heat level, as growing conditions which increase heat level also cause the pepper to form scars. For US consumer markets, 'corking' is considered unattractive; however, in other markets, it is a favored trait, particularly in pickled or oil-preserved jalapeños.

The heat level of jalapeños varies even for fruit from the same plant; however, some cultivars have been bred to be generally milder, and on the low side of the heat range, such as the 'TAM Milds' and 'Dulcito', and others to be generally hotter, and on the high end of the heat range, such as 'Grande'. As the peppers ripen their pungency increases, making red jalapeños to be generally hotter than green jalapeños, at least of the same variety. If the jalapeño plants were stressed by increased water salinity, erratic watering, temperature, light, soil nutrition, insects, or illness, this will increase their pungency.

All of the capsaicin and related compounds are concentrated in vesicles found in the placenta membrane surrounding the seeds; the vesicles appear white or yellow and fluoresce in the range of 530 to 600 nm when placed in violet light. If fresh chili peppers come in contact with the skin, eyes, lips or other membranes, irritation can occur; some people who are particularly sensitive wear latex or vinyl gloves while handling peppers. If irritation does occur, washing the oils off with hot soapy water and applying vegetable oil to the skin may help. When preparing jalapeños, it is recommended that hands not come in contact with the eyes as this leads to burning and redness.

=== Serving methods ===
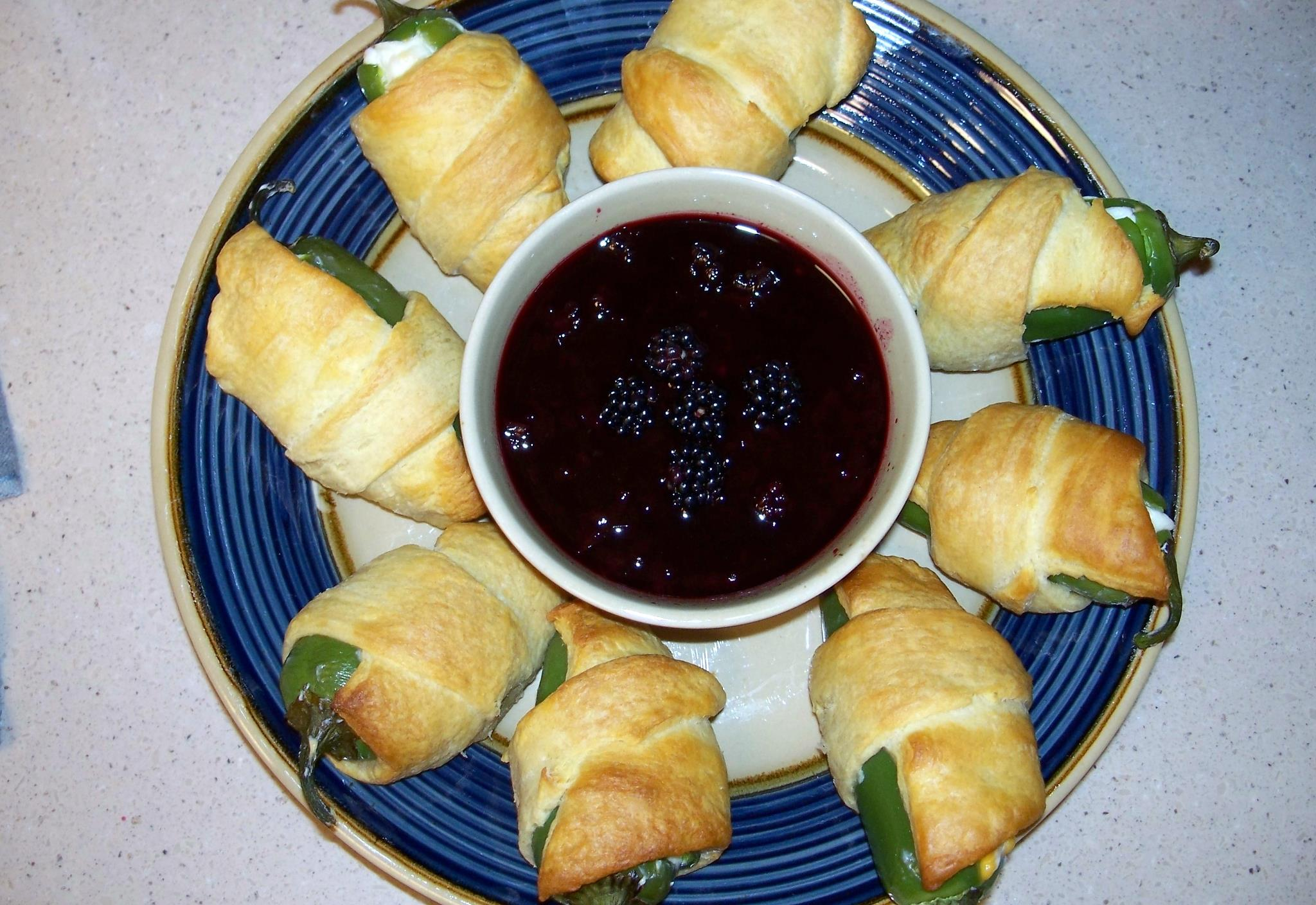
Jalapeño peppers wrapped in crescent rolls

- Stuffed jalapeños are hollowed-out fresh jalapeños (served cooked or raw) filled with seafood, meat, poultry, or cheese.
- Pickled jalapeños, a type of pickled pepper, sliced or whole, are often served hot or cold on top of nachos, which are tortilla chips with melted cheese on top, a Tex-Mex dish.
- Chipotles are smoked ripe jalapeños.
- Jalapeño jelly, which is a pepper jelly, can be prepared using jelling methods.
- Jalapeño peppers are often muddled and served in mixed drinks.
- Jalapeño poppers are an appetizer; jalapeños are stuffed with cheese, usually cheddar or cream cheese, breaded or wrapped in bacon, and cooked.
- Armadillo eggs are jalapeños or similar chilis stuffed with cheese, coated in seasoned sausage meat and wrapped in bacon. The "eggs" are then grilled until the bacon starts to crisp.
- Chiles toreados are fresh jalapeños that are sauteed in oil until the skin is blistered all over. They are sometimes served with melted cheese on top.
- Texas toothpicks are jalapeños and onions shaved into straws, lightly breaded, and deep-fried.
- Chopped jalapeños are a common ingredient in many salsas and chilis.
- Jalapeño slices are commonly served in Vietnamese pho and bánh mì, and are also a common sandwich and pizza topping in the West.

=== Culinary concerns ===
Jalapeños are a low-acid food with a pH of 4.8–6.0 depending on maturity and individual pepper. If canned or pickled jalapeños appear gassy, mushy, moldy, or have a disagreeable odor, then to avoid botulism, special precautions are needed to avoid illness and spread of the bacteria. Canning or packaging in calcium chloride increases the firmness of the peppers and the calcium content, whether or not the peppers are pickled as well as canned.

In 2008, fresh jalapeños from Mexico were tested positive for Salmonella leading the FDA to believe that the peppers were responsible for much of the 2008 United States salmonellosis outbreak. This large outbreak of Salmonella led to increased research into the detection of pathogens on jalapeños, the frequency and behavior of foodborne illness related to jalapeños, and ways to prevent foodborne illnesses from fresh jalapeños. Contaminated irrigation water and processing water are the two most common methods by which jalapeños become contaminated, as was the case in the 2008 outbreak. Jalapeños have similar microbial properties to tomatoes. The outer layer of their skin provides a safe environment for pathogens to survive, and if damaged or chopped provides a growth medium for these pathogens. Washing fresh jalapeños is important to reduce pathogen counts both at the farm and consumer level, but without cold storage it is insufficient to prevent pathogen spread.

== In culture ==
The jalapeño is a Mexican chili but was designated by the Texas Legislature as the official "State Pepper of Texas" in 1995. In Mexico, jalapeños are used in many forms such as in salsa, pico de gallo, or grilled jalapeños. Jalapeños were included as food on the Space Shuttle as early as 1982.

Guinness World Records recognizes Alfredo Hernandes for the most jalapeños eaten in a minute: 16, on 17 September 2006 at the La Costeña Feel the Heat Challenge in Chicago, Illinois. Patrick Bertoletti holds the Major League Eating jalapeño records at 275 pickled jalapeños in 8 minutes on 1 May 2011, and 191 pickled jalapeños in 6.5 minutes on 16 September 2007 in the 'Short-Form'.

Joaquín Guzmán, also known as "El Chapo", the leader of the Sinaloa Cartel, operated a cannery in Guadalajara producing "Comadre Jalapeños" in order to ship cocaine to the US.

The official mascot of the 1986 FIFA World Cup was Pique, a jalapeño pepper, characteristic of Mexican cuisine, with a moustache, a Colimote sombrero, and Mexican football team colors. Its name comes from picante, a Spanish word meaning "spicy", and was also a pun on the "PK" abbreviation of the football term penalty kick. Pique is also a common Spanish name.

September 5th is recognized as National Jalapeno Day.

== Gallery ==
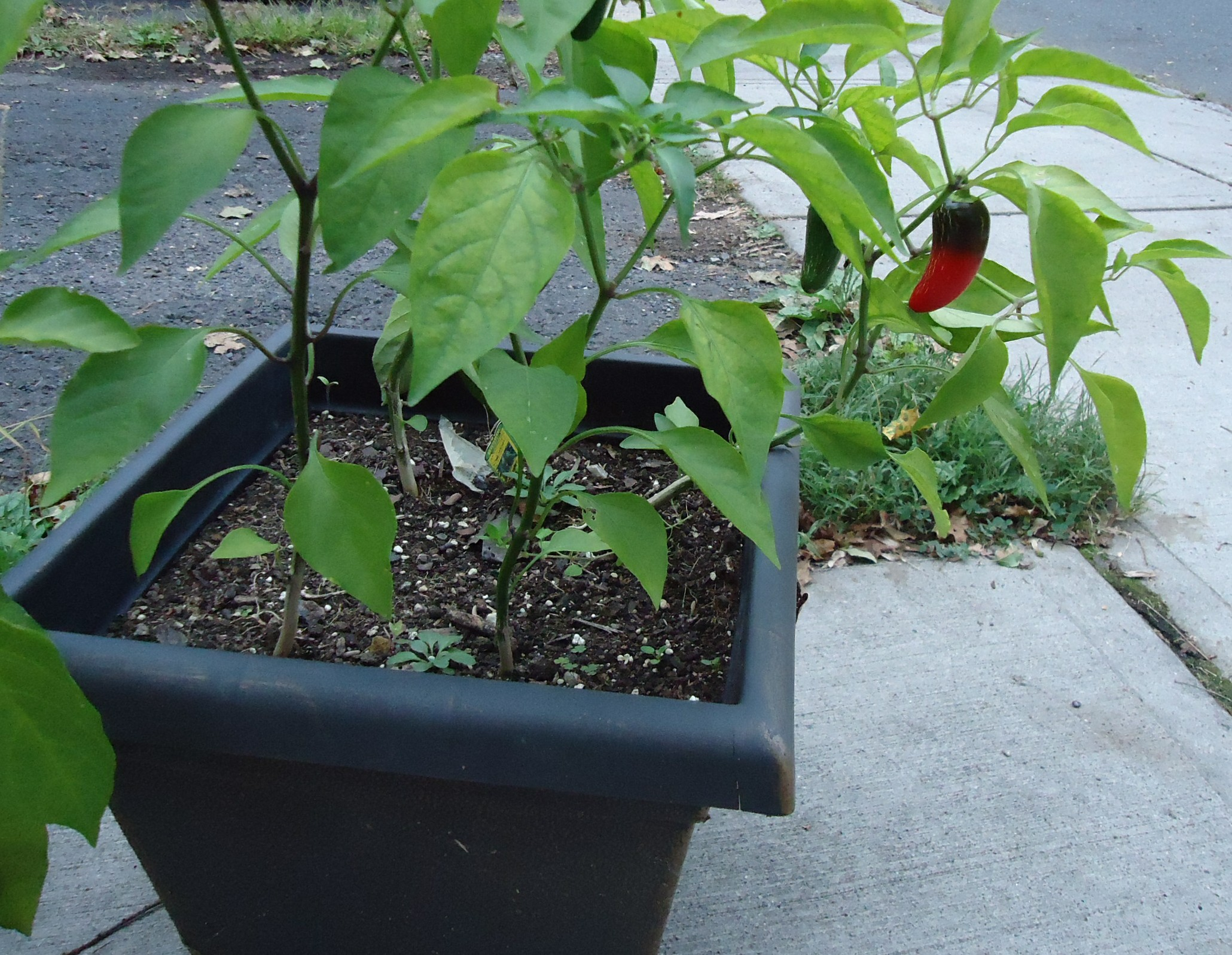
Maturing jalapeño in a planter box

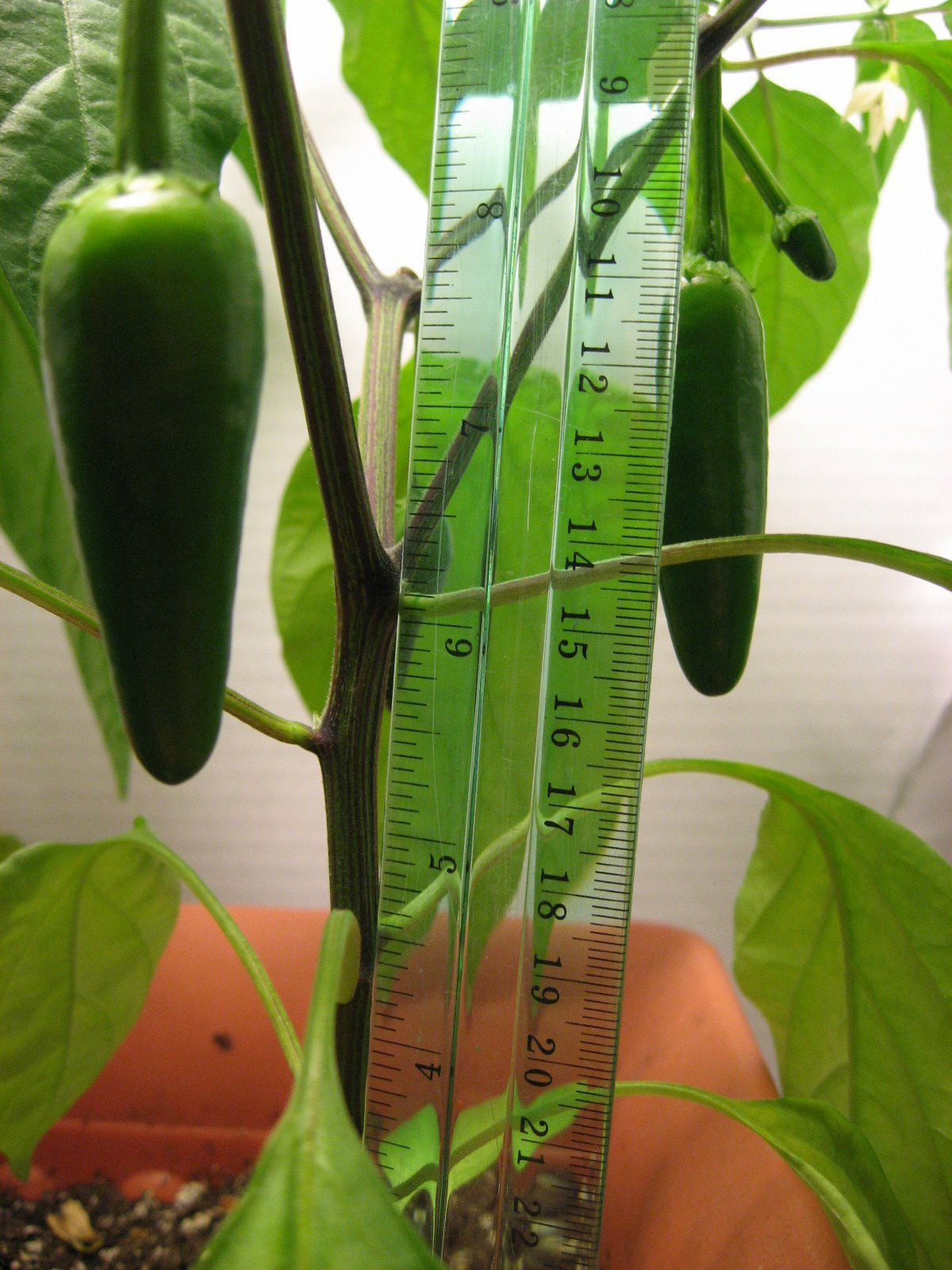
A jalapeño plant with pods

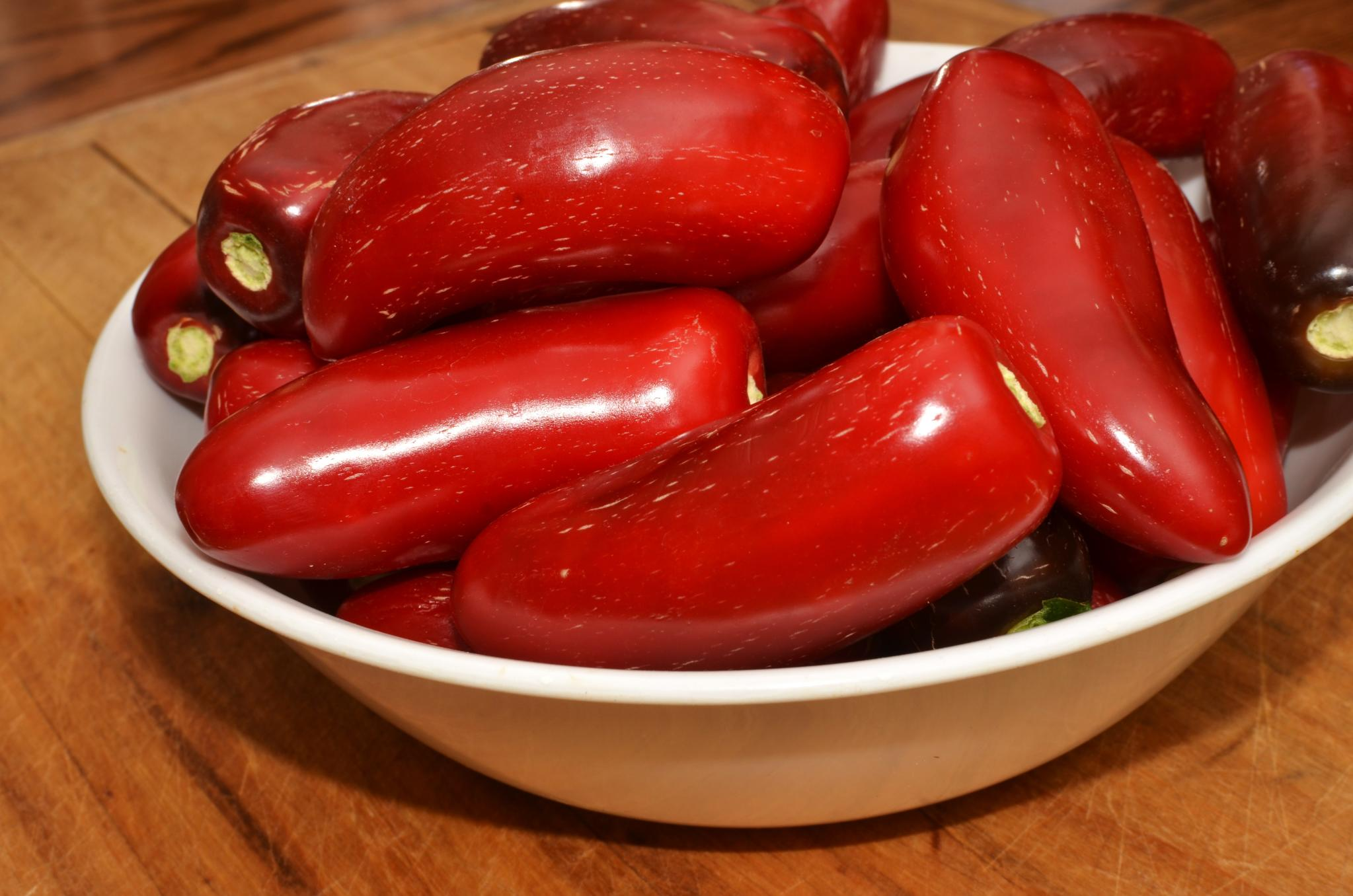
Ripened jalapeños

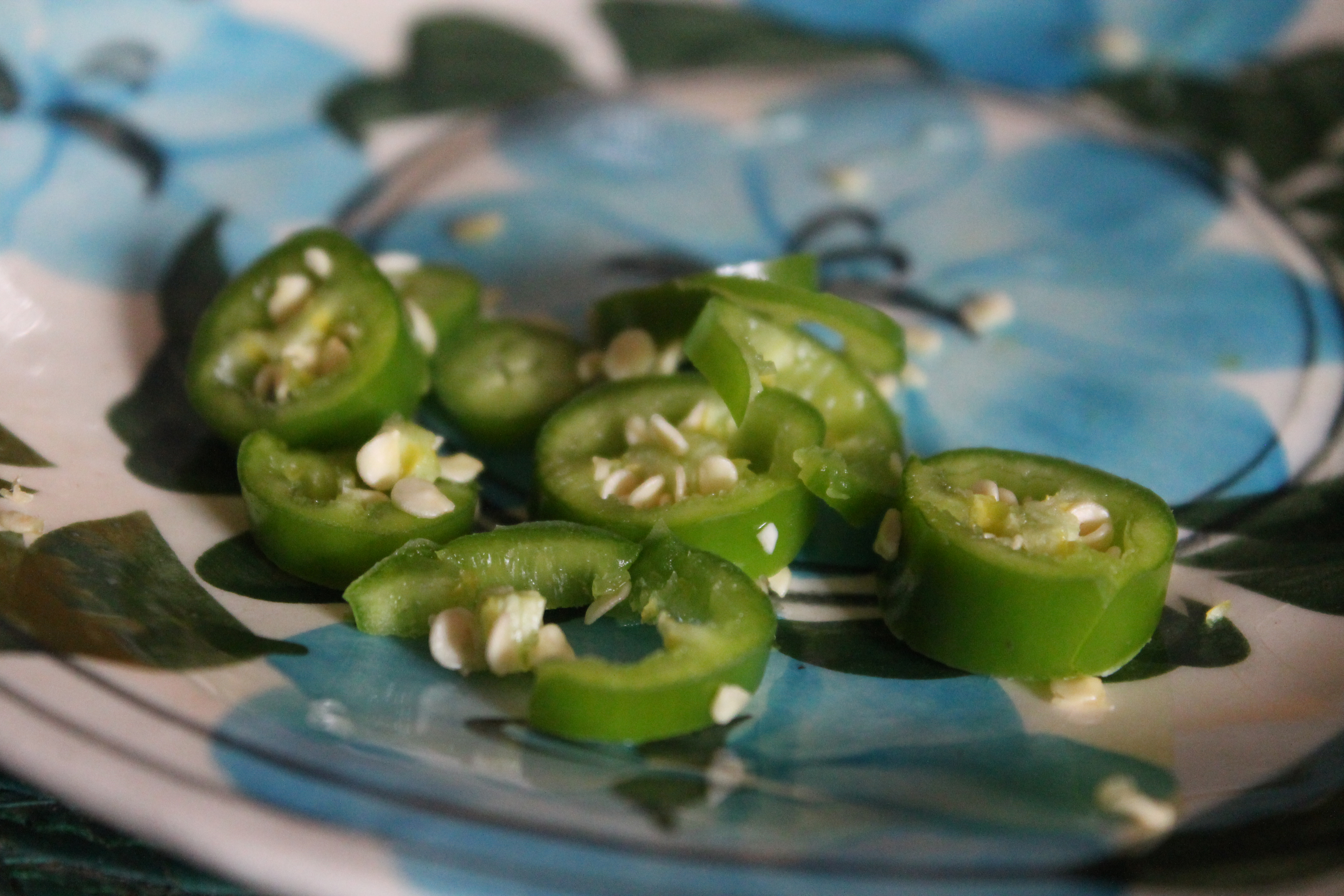
Fresh sliced jalapeños

== See also ==
- Capsicum
- Habanero
- List of hot sauces
- Washington's Birthday Celebration in Laredo, Texas, which includes the annual Jalapeño Festival in February
