= Sandia pepper =

Cultivar of the New Mexico chile pepper

- Species: Capsicum annuum
- Cultivar group: New Mexico chile
- Origin: United States
- Heat: Hot
- Scoville scale: 5,000–30,000 SHU

The Sandia pepper or Sandia chile pepper is a New Mexico chile pepper cultivar of the species Capsicum annuum with a scoville rating which ranges from mild to hot. This cultivar is extensively grown in New Mexico where it was developed and is popular in New Mexican cuisine. Sandia peppers picked while still green are typically roasted to produce green chile. When ripened, this variety can be dried and ground to make chile powder. Sandia peppers grown and consumed in New Mexico are most commonly used to make red or green posole, green chile stew, menudo, and carne adovada. The flavor is described as fruity, floral, grassy, and sweet with a strong umami flavor and a heat level similar to a ripe Jalapeno.

== History ==
The Sandia chile pepper cultivar was developed at New Mexico State University by Dr. Roy Harper in 1956 by cross breeding a NuMex No. 9 (originally developed by Dr. Fabian Garcia) with a Californian Anaheim chile (itself a No. 9 descendant). This variety of chile pepper is of moderate heat and is widely grown and consumed in New Mexico. Sandia peppers are consumed both as green chile as well as ripe red chile, and are also dried into ristras. They are considered high yielding with relatively large fruits. In common with most New Mexico chile cultivars, Sandia peppers are somewhat variable in their fruiting and produce individual peppers of varying heat, with most of the peppers being mild to medium (5,000 SHU), and an occasional extremely hot pepper (30,000 SHU). Removing the seeds from the peppers before cooking or consuming them significantly reduces the heat of this variety of pepper as Sandia peppers can be quite hot.

== See also ==
- Big Jim pepper
- Chimayó pepper
- Fresno chile
- New Mexico No. 9
- Santa Fe Grande
- New Mexico chile
- List of Capsicum cultivars
