= Chimayo pepper =

Variety of New Mexico chile pepper

Chimayó pepper
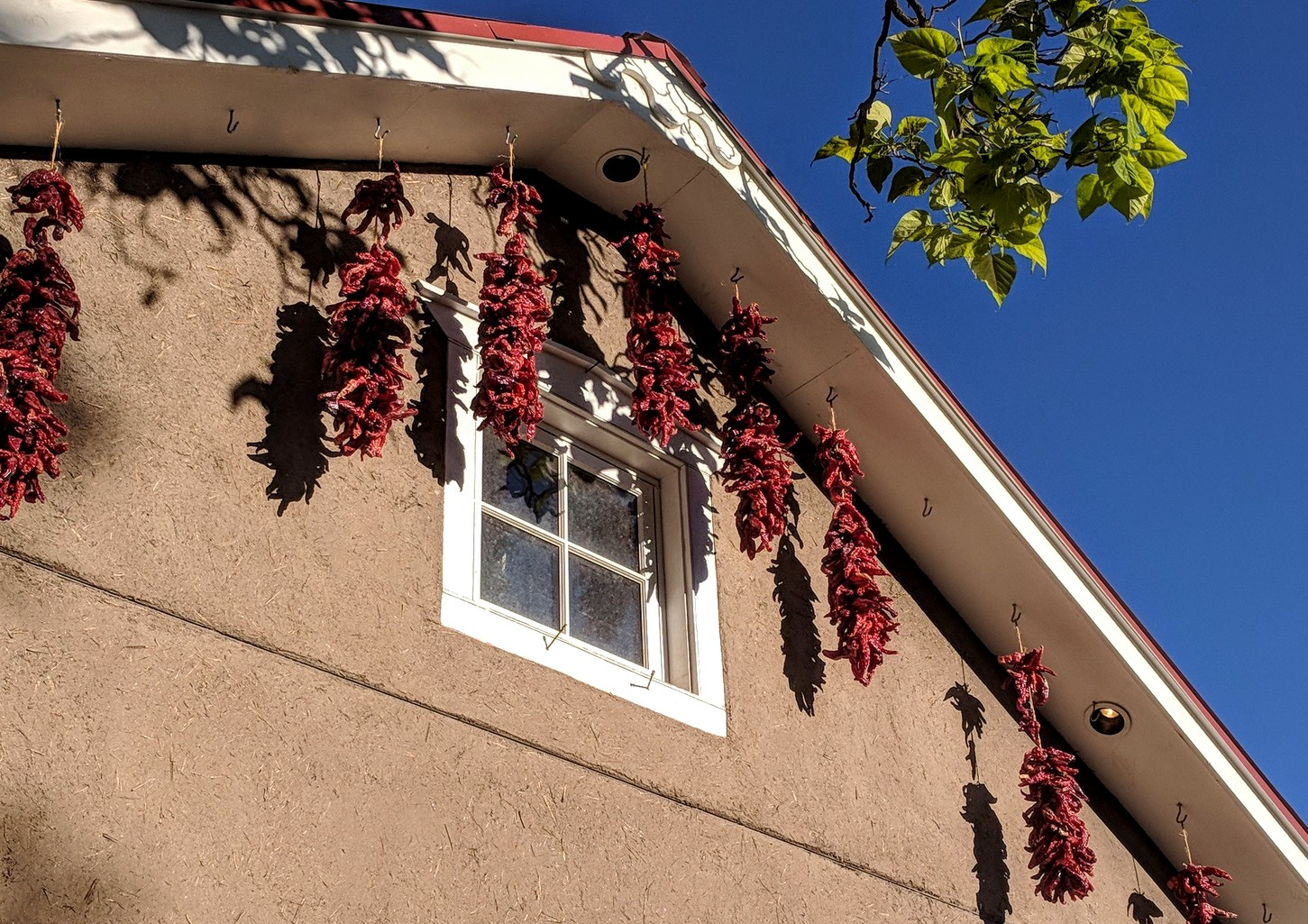
- Species: Capsicum annuum
- Cultivar group: New Mexico chile
- Cultivar: 'Chimayó'
- Origin: United States
- Heat: Medium
- Scoville scale: 4,000–6,000 SHU

The Chimayó (or Chimayo) pepper is a New Mexico chile pepper landrace of the species Capsicum annuum. It is named after the town of Chimayó, New Mexico, where roughly 200 hectares (500 acres) of Chimayó peppers are harvested annually. It is considered one of the two best chiles in the state, the others being those grown in Hatch. The pepper is so prized that powdered Chimayó pepper can cost as much as $100 per pound. Chimayó chiles have a complex flavor described as sweet and smoky, and are extremely popular in New Mexican cuisine for making posole, menudo, and carne adovada.

The arid climate of the town of Chimayó greatly influences the appearance of the Chimayó pepper, giving it a twisted shape when dried. Its color can be compared to that of the Jalapeño, transitioning from green to red as the fruit matures. Chimayó peppers are of medium pungency, and have a heat level ranging from 4,000 to 6,000 on the Scoville scale. Chimayó pepper plants typically grow to a height of roughly 45 to 60 centimetres (18 to 24 in), while the fruits reach 10 to 15 cm (4 to 6 in) in length and 3–4 cm (1–1 3/4 in) width.

Chimayó peppers are commonly dried by being hung on ristras; Once dried, they can be ground into chile powder or chile flakes. The flavor is described as sweet, earthy, and smoky, without being too hot, and the fruit is also fleshier and drier. The pepper can also be used fresh for salsas, stir-frys, roasted, or stuffed.

== See also ==
- Big Jim pepper
- Fresno chile
- New Mexico No. 9
- Sandia pepper
- Santa Fe Grande
- New Mexico chile
- List of Capsicum cultivars
