= Unexpected Cheddar =

Cheese product

- Type: Cheese
- Region or state: Wisconsin
- Created by: Trader Joe's
- Invented: 2011
- Food energy (per serving): 110 kcal (460 kJ)
Nutritional value
(per serving)
- Protein: 7 g
- Fat: 9 g
- Carbohydrate: less than 1 g
- Similar dishes: Cheddar cheese

Unexpected Cheddar is a cheese product by American grocery chain Trader Joe's. It was first introduced in 2011. It was inducted into the Product Hall of Fame in 2023.

== Name ==
The term "Unexpected Cheddar" comes from the "unexpectedness" of the cheese having several different tastes, including parmesan cheese, despite being technically a cheddar.

== Variations ==
Trader Joe's has created several variations of the popular product, including a cheese spread that is used for making mac and cheese,, shredded Unexpected Cheddar, Unexpected Cheddar chicken sausage, Unexpected Cheddar and turkey sausage egg bites, Unexpected Broccoli Cheddar Soup, and a spread with hatch chile.

== Reviews ==
Unexpected Cheddar has generally received positive reviews, while reviews of its variations are mixed. America's Test Kitchen positively reviewed Unexpected Cheddar, calling it "supercreamy and smooth with just a hint of crunch ... a delight." However, they had a more negative review of the spread variation, saying that it's almost like "frosting that’s been spread on a cake while it’s still hot." Alex Beggs of Bon Appétit wrote that the spread with hatch chile was "[his] platonic ideal of a bar cheese. Soft and creamy, with some cheddar bite and gentle green chile heat." Cheese: The word on culture acclaimed the original Unexpected Cheddar, but criticised the spread for being too dense and being made up of just cheese and butter.
