= Santa Fe Grande =

Cultivar of New Mexico chile pepper

- Species: Capsicum annuum
- Cultivar group: New Mexico chile
- Cultivar: 'Santa Fe Grande'
- Heat: Low
- Scoville scale: 0-999 SHU

The Santa Fe Grande is a New Mexico chile pepper, also known as "Yellow hot chili pepper" and the "Güero chili pepper", is a prolific cultivar used in the Southwestern United States. The plants are resistant to tobacco mosaic virus.

The conical, blunt fruits are about 2 in (5.1 cm) long. They ripen from a pale yellow to a bright orange or fiery red.

The peppers grow upright on 24" chili plants. Santa Fe Grande's fruits have a slightly sweet taste and are fairly mild in pungency. Fresno chile peppers are of the Santa Fe Grande group.

== See also ==
- Big Jim pepper
- Chimayó pepper
- Fresno chile
- New Mexico No. 9
- Sandia pepper
- New Mexico chile
- List of Capsicum cultivars
