= Fresno chile =

Cultivar of New Mexico chile pepper

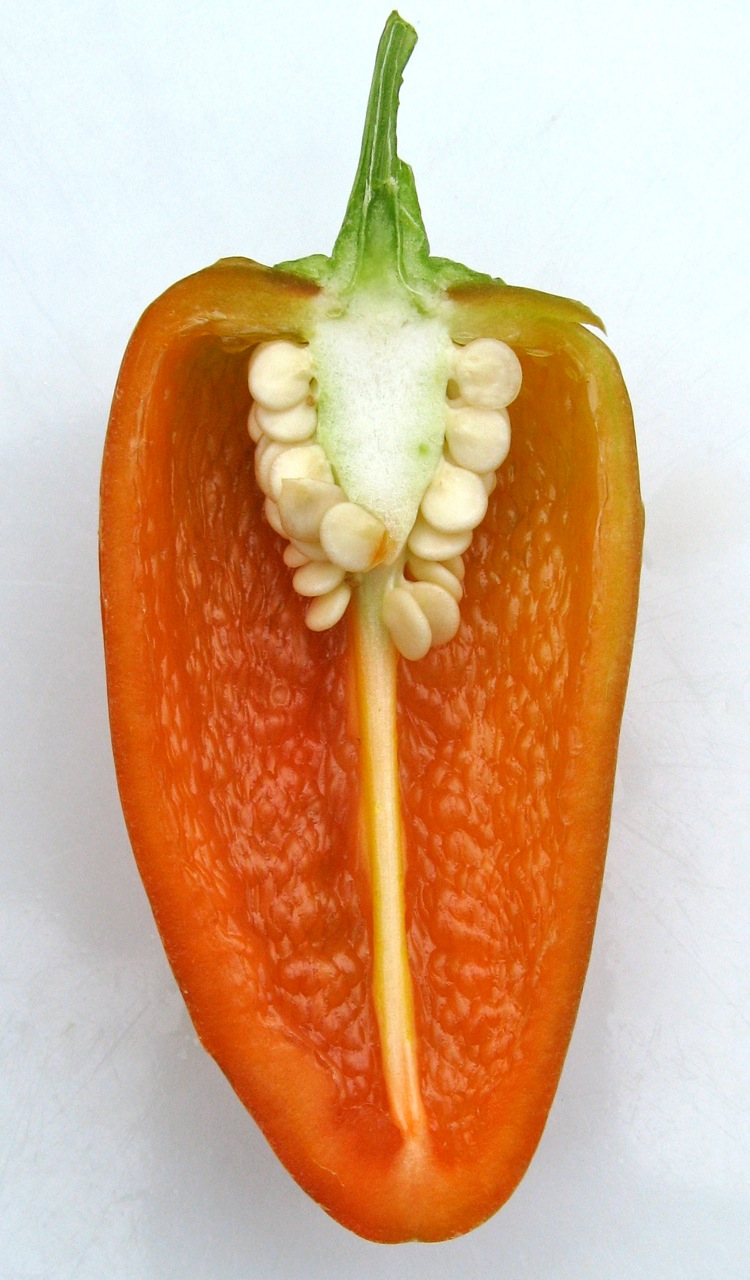
- Cross section of a Fresno chile pepper
- Species: Capsicum annuum
- Cultivar group: New Mexico chile
- Cultivar: Fresno chile
- Heat: Medium
- Scoville scale: 2,500–10,000 SHU

The Fresno chile or Fresno chili pepper (/ˈfrɛznoʊ/ FREZ-noh) is a medium-sized cultivar of Capsicum annuum. It should not be confused with the Fresno Bell pepper. It is often confused with the jalapeño pepper but has thinner walls, often has milder heat, and takes less time to mature. It is, however, a Fresno County chile, which is genetically distinct from the jalapeño and it grows point up, rather than point down as with the jalapeño. The fruit starts out bright green changing to orange and red as fully matured. A mature Fresno pepper will be conical in shape, 50 mm (2 in) long, and about 25 mm (1 in) in diameter at the stem. The plants do well in warm to hot temperatures and dry climates with long sunny summer days and cool nights. They are very cold-sensitive but are disease resistant. The plants may reach a height of 60–75 cm (24–30 in).

== History ==
The Fresno chile was developed and released for commercial cultivation by Clarence Brown Hamlin in 1952. Hamlin named the pepper "Fresno" in honor of Fresno, California. It is grown throughout California, specifically in the San Joaquin Valley.

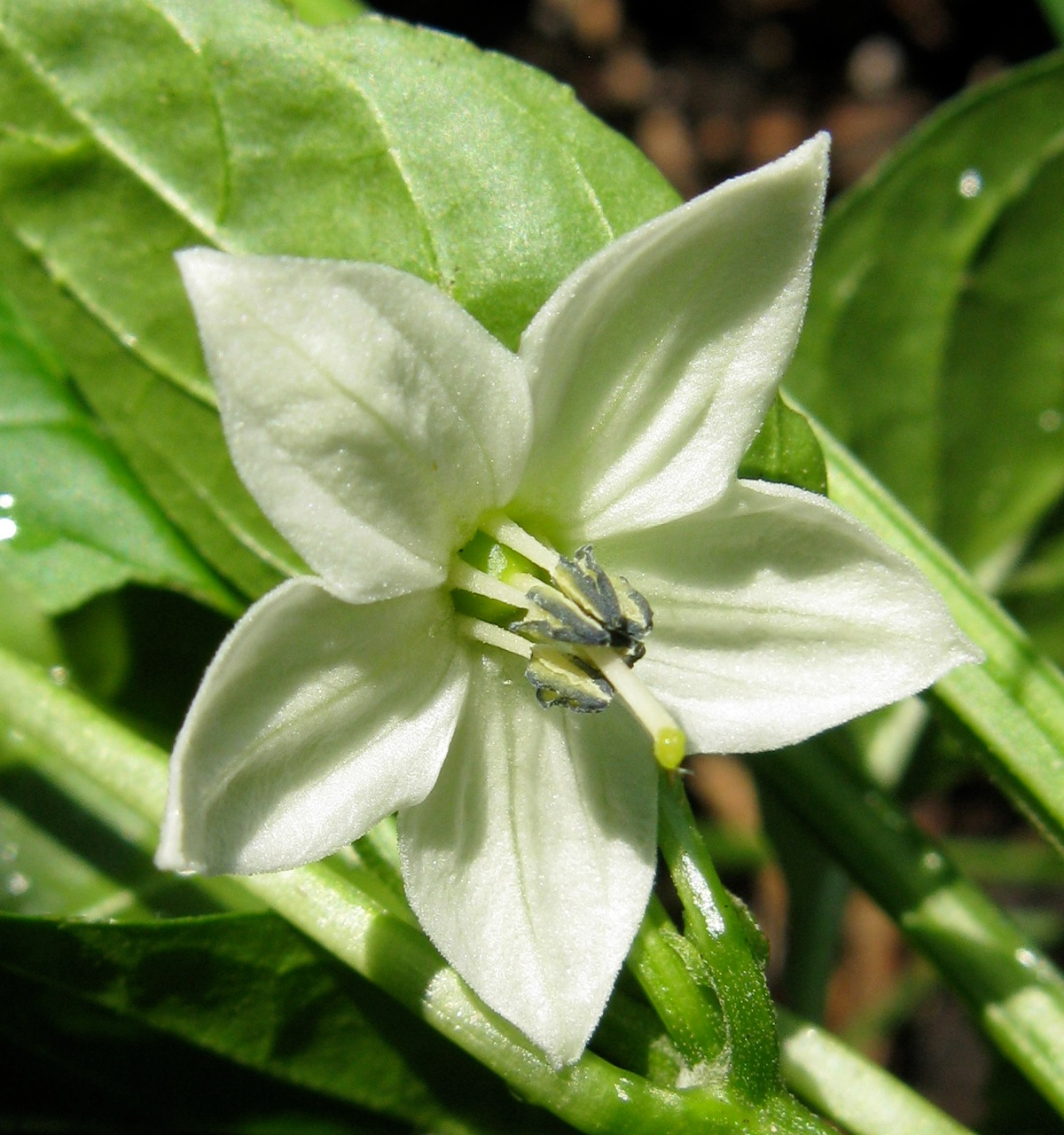
Flowers of the Fresno Chile pepper are white, with black pollen

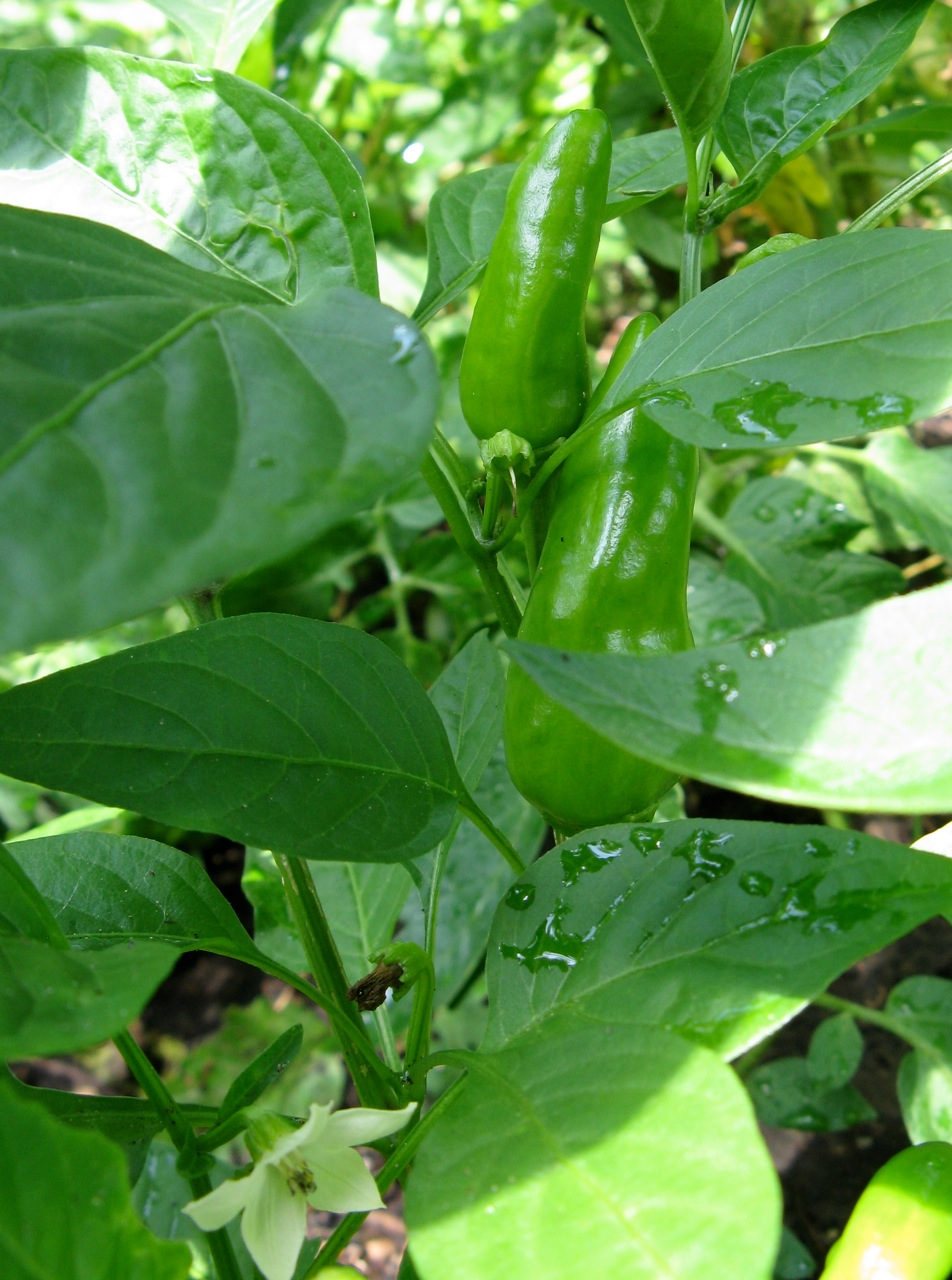
Immature fruit of the Fresno Chile pepper point upwards

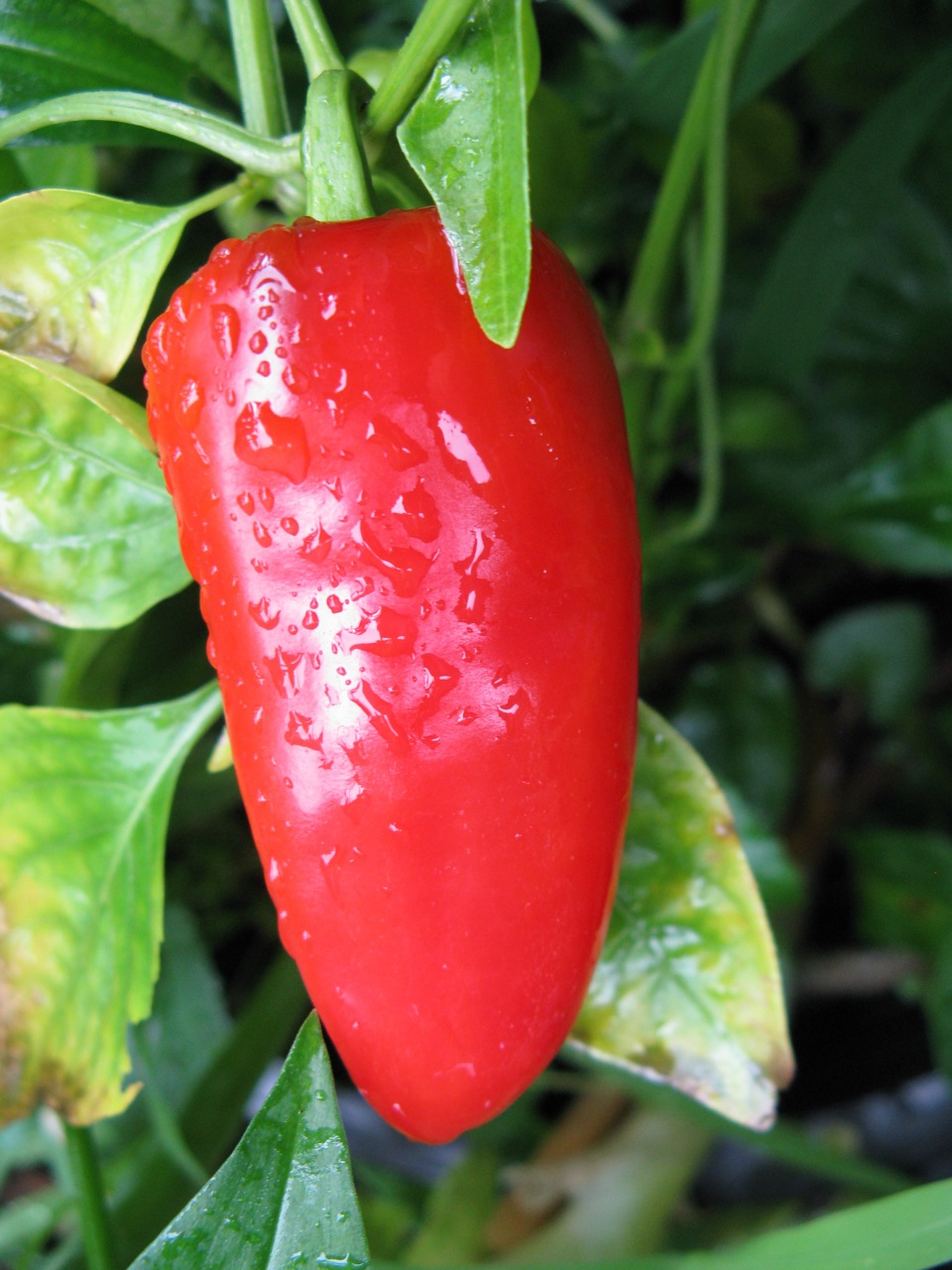
Fully mature fruit hang down on the plant

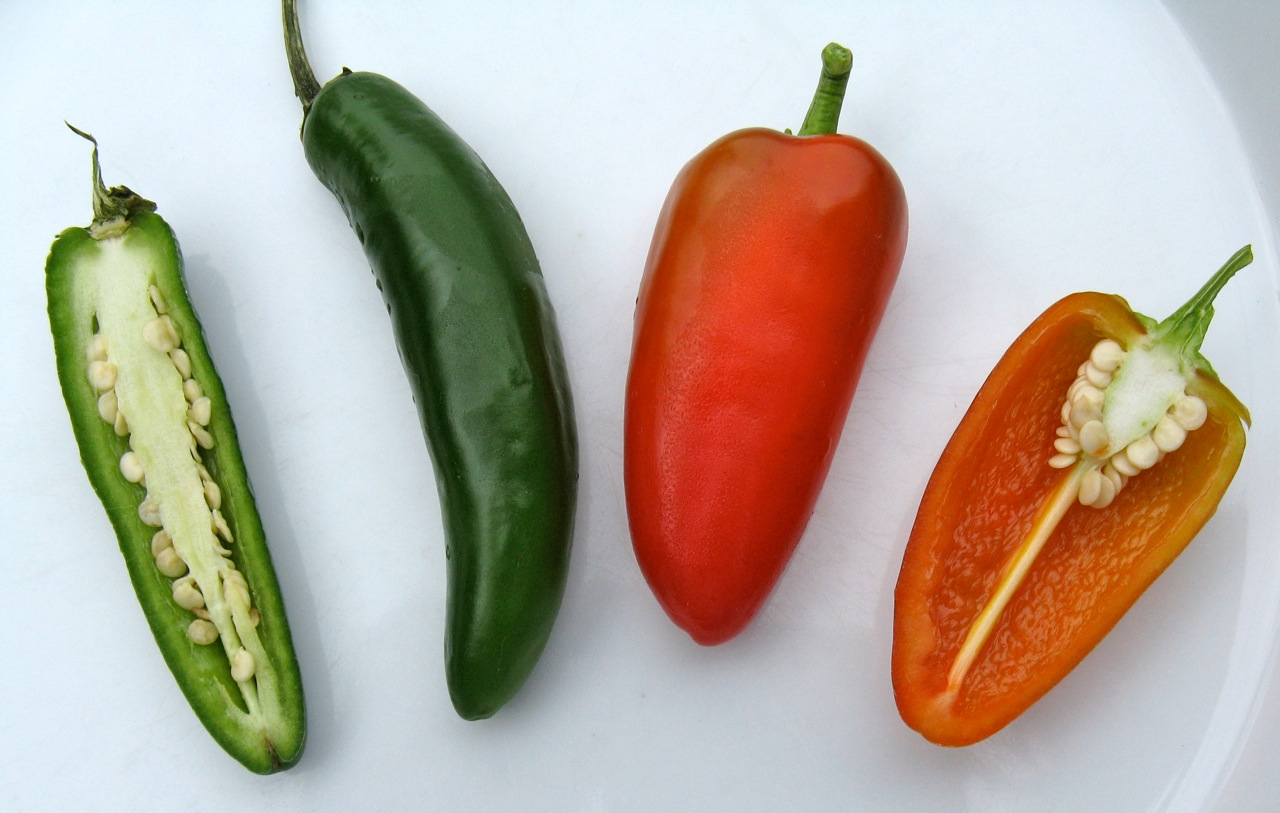
Fruit (right two) compared to 'Jalapeño' (left two)

== Uses ==
Fresno chiles are frequently used for ceviche, salsa and as an accompaniment for rice and black beans. Because of their thick walls, they do not dry well and are not good for chili powder. In cooking, they can often be substituted for or with jalapeño and serrano peppers. Mild green ones can typically be purchased in the summer while the hot red ones are available in the fall. It has different culinary usages depending on its maturity.

The immature green fruits are versatile and can be added to many types of dishes. They add mild heat and flavor to sauces, chutneys, dips, relishes, casseroles, soups, stews and savory dishes. Green Fresnos can also be pickled and eaten whole. They make an excellent garnish for Mexican and Southwestern American cuisine.

Mature red Fresno peppers provide more flavor and less heat than jalapeño peppers. They are often added to salsas, relishes, ceviches, and marinades. They make good toppings for tacos, tostadas, burgers, sausages and hot dogs. They are large enough to stuff with cheeses, potatoes, seafood and meat. Specific recipes include versions of Romesco and rojo cream sauces.

== Nutritional and medical information ==
Fresno chiles are an excellent source of vitamin C and B vitamins, containing significant amounts of iron, thiamin, niacin, magnesium and riboflavin. They are low in calories, fat, and sodium and help to reduce cholesterol. Many of these nutrients reach their highest concentrations in red ripe fruit. The heat element is from capsaicin, a chemical compound that provides natural anti-inflammatory and pain relief and promotes a feeling of being full. Chilies contain a good amount of minerals including potassium, manganese, iron, and magnesium.

== See also ==
- Big Jim pepper
- Chimayó pepper
- Jalapeño pepper
- New Mexico No. 9
- Sandia pepper
- Santa Fe Grande
- Serrano pepper
- New Mexico chile
- List of Capsicum cultivars
