= New Mexico chile =

Cultivar group of chile peppers from New Mexico, United States

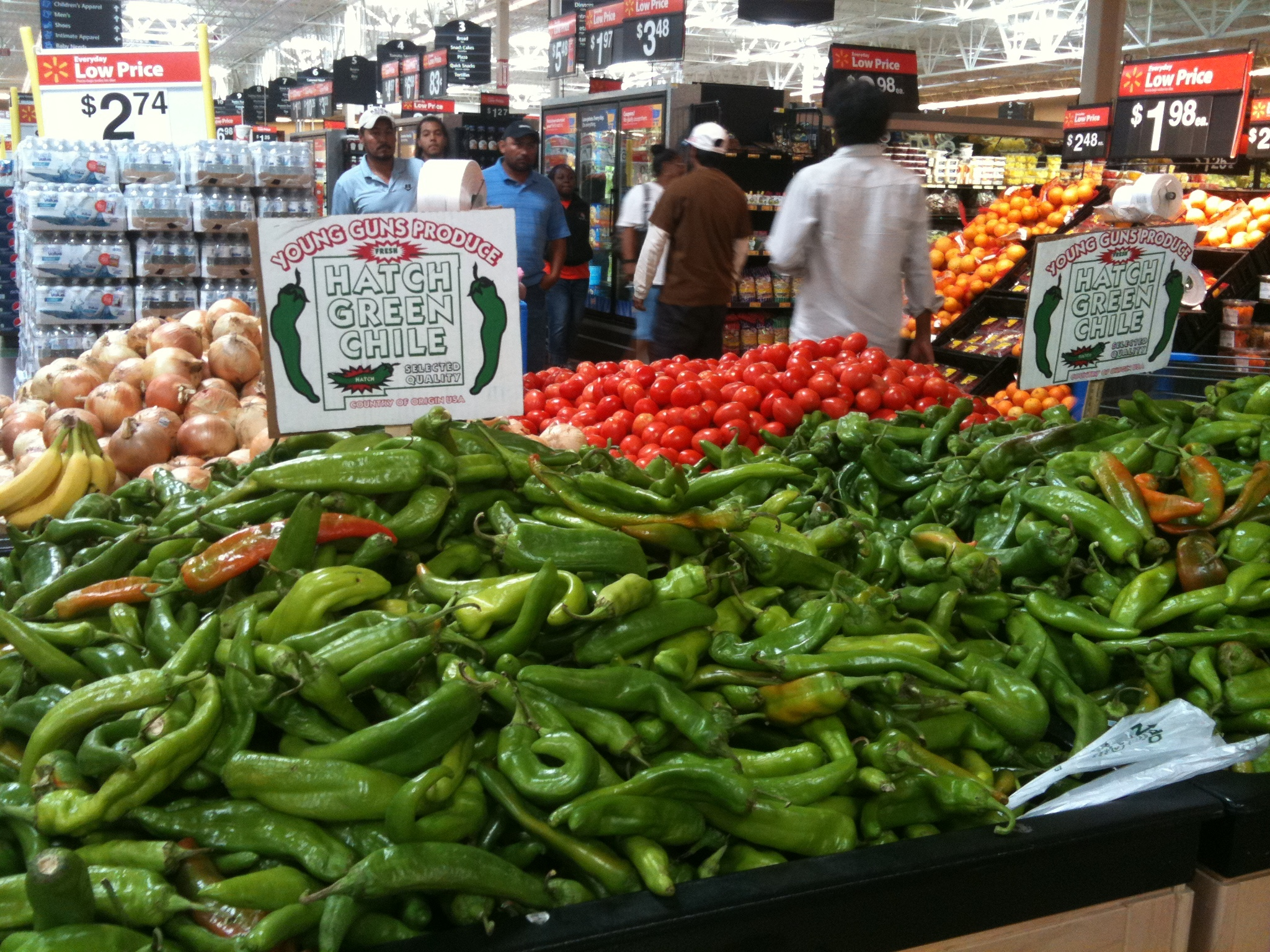
- Species: Capsicum annuum
- Cultivar group: New Mexico
- Marketing names: New Mexico Chile, green chile, red chile, Anaheim pepper, Pueblo chile
- Breeder: Fabián García
- Origin: New Mexico
- Heat: Hot
- Scoville scale: 0–100,000 SHU

New Mexico chile or New Mexican chile (Capsicum annuum 'New Mexico Group'; Spanish: chile de Nuevo México, chile del norte), is a cultivar group of the chile pepper from the US state of New Mexico, first grown by Pueblo and Hispano communities throughout Santa Fe de Nuevo México. These landrace chile plants were used to develop the modern New Mexico chile peppers by horticulturist Fabián García and his students, including Roy Nakayama, at what is now New Mexico State University in 1894.

New Mexico chile, which typically grows from a green to a ripened red, is popular in the cuisines of the Southwestern United States, including Sonoran and Arizonan cuisine, and it is an integral staple of New Mexican cuisine. It is also sometimes featured in broader Mexican cuisine. Chile is one of New Mexico's state vegetables, and is referenced in the New Mexico state question "Red or Green?".

The flavor of New Mexico green chile has been described as lightly pungent, similar to an onion, or like garlic with a subtly sweet, spicy, crisp, and smoky taste. The ripened red chile retains this flavor, but adds an earthiness and bite. The spiciness depends on the variety.

== History ==
Various types of chile plants were first grown by the Puebloan peoples, who continue to grow their own strains, each with a distinct pungency, sweetness, taste, and heat. For example, the Zia Pueblo chile has a bitter-sweet flavor when it matures into its red color. When the Spanish arrived, they introduced European cultivation techniques to the chile plants, and eventually created cultivars in their towns.

The New Mexican type cultivars were developed by the horticulturist Fabián García, whose major release was the 'New Mexico No. 9' chile pepper in 1913. Earlier work was done by Emelio Ortega (see section "Anaheim Pepper" below). These cultivars are "hotter" than others to suit the tastes of New Mexicans in their traditional foods. Selective breeding began with 14 lineages of 'Pasilla', 'Colorado', and 'Negro' cultivars, from throughout New Mexico and Southern Colorado. These first commercially viable peppers were created to have a "larger, smoother, fleshier, more tapering and shoulderless pod for canning purposes".

Paul Bosland, an expert on chile genetics, breeding, and germplasm evaluation, founded the Chile Pepper Institute in 1992 at New Mexico State University to study New Mexico's state vegetable and peppers from around the world. New Mexico chile is exported worldwide to Europe, Australia, and Japan, among other places.

== Cultivation ==
Fruits of New Mexico chile plants are grown from seeds, and each individual strain is specifically bred and grown to be disease-resistant and provide consistent and healthy plants within their specific regions. Altitude, climate, soil, and acreage affect a crop's taste, making the New Mexican region, including the Rio Grande bosque, mountains, and high deserts, a favorable environment for plant propagation and growth. To ensure that a variety's lineage remains disease-resistant and maintains optimal growth within its heritage region, seeds from specific plants are carefully selected. An example of a New Mexican chile grown outside the state is the 'Anaheim' pepper, which is extremely resilient in multiple altitudes. An aspect of the New Mexico chile plants regards reintroducing seeds from their heritage soil, since each successive generation becomes susceptible to disease and loss of flavor. Therefore, local chile farmers usually order seeds from their heritage soils, every few generations, to reinvigorate their crop. This allows New Mexico chile growers to perpetuate successful productions.

=== Grown in New Mexico ===
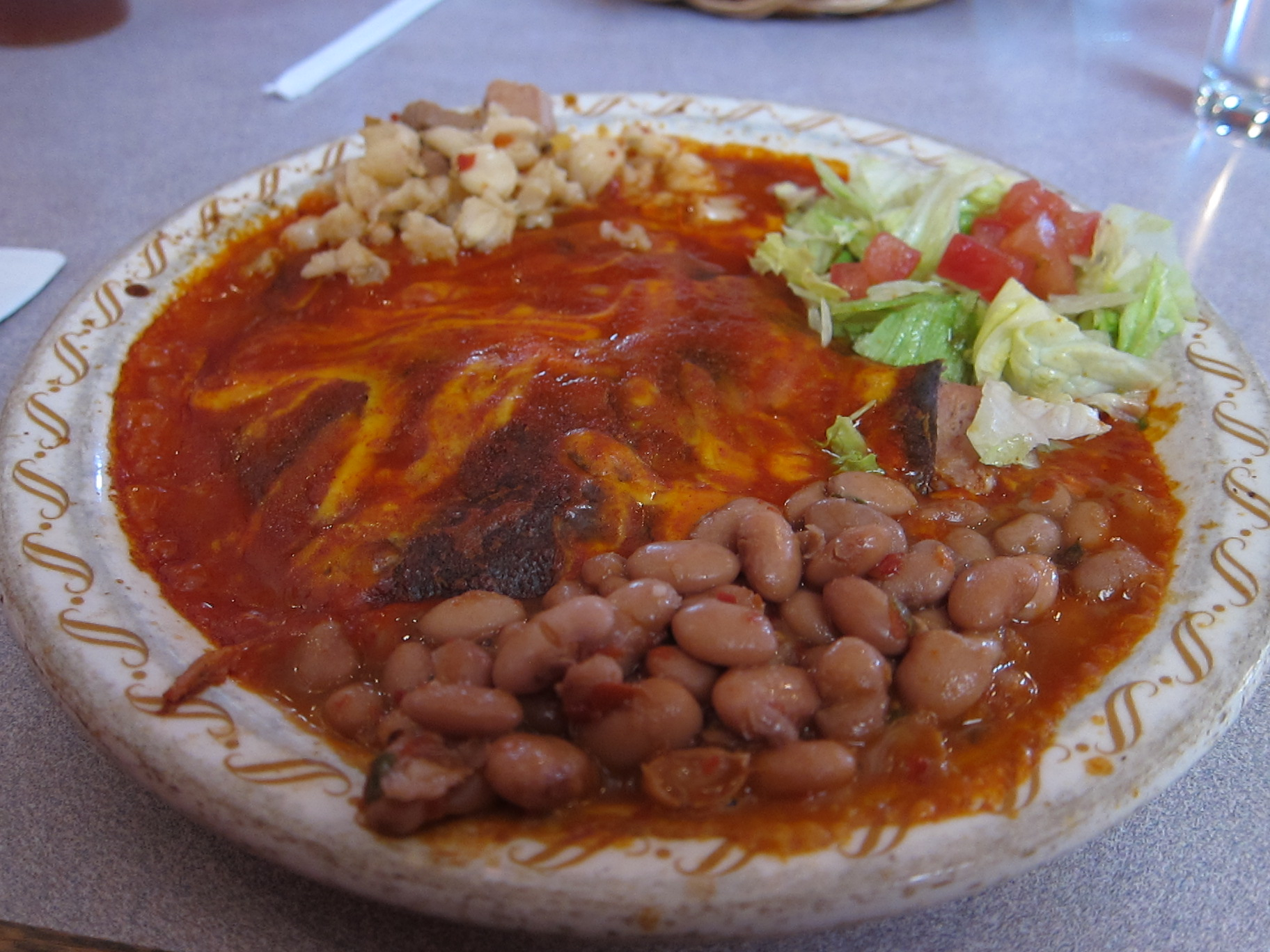
New Mexico cuisine stacked enchiladas (enchilada montada), red chile smothered, made with blue corn tortillas and chicken

New Mexico chile plants grown in New Mexico are valued for their flavor, texture, and hardiness due to their growing environment. The plants were originally grown by the Puebloans, and each of their distinct Pueblo plants grows best in its heritage soil. This same trend has continued with other New Mexico chile varietals grown by Spanish, Mexican, and American settlers. Among New Mexico-grown chile, the ones with the most accolades are grown along the Rio Grande, especially along the Hatch Valley. Multiple other locations in the Rio Grande Valley, outside of the Hatch Valley, also grow award-winning chile.

Towns and cities across New Mexico have strong chile traditions, including Hatch, Chimayó, Española, Lemitar, and San Antonio; and in the Albuquerque metropolitan area from Albuquerque, Bosque, Corrales, Los Ranchos de Albuquerque, and Bosque Farms.

==== Hatch chile ====
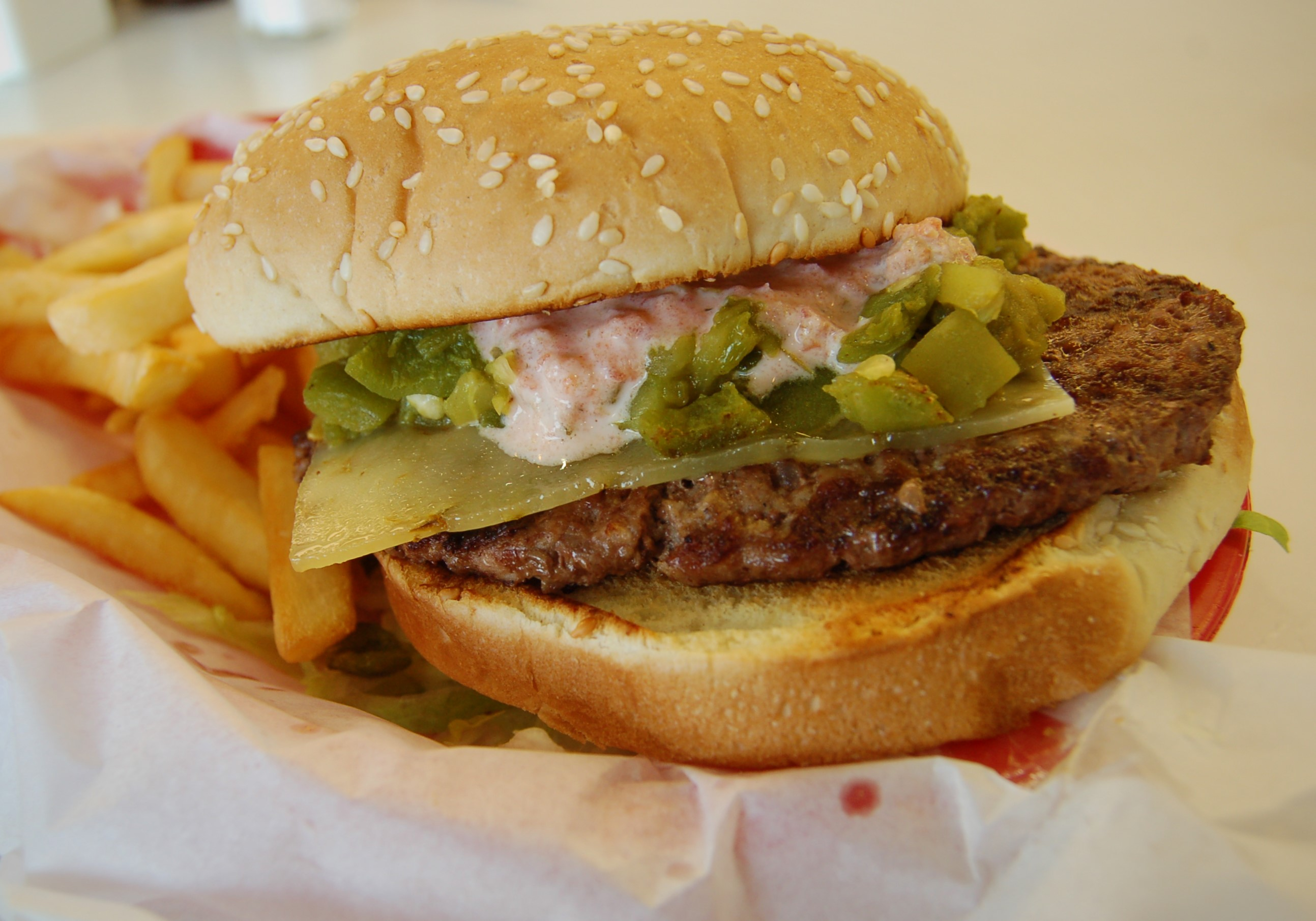
Hatch green chile cheeseburger

Hatch chile refers to varieties of species of the genus Capsicum which are grown in the Hatch Valley, an area stretching north and south along the Rio Grande from Arrey, New Mexico, in the north to Tonuco Mountain to the southeast of Hatch, New Mexico. The soil and growing conditions in the Hatch Valley create a unique terroir which contributes to the flavor of chile grown there. Most of the varieties of chile cultivated in the Hatch Valley have been developed at New Mexico State University over the last 130 years.

Hatch chile can be purchased locally in many parts of the Southwest. Some distributors use the "Hatch" name, but do not actually grow and process their chile in the Hatch Valley. To protect Hatch and other New Mexican growers, state legislators passed a 2012 law prohibiting the sale in New Mexico of chile described as "New Mexican" unless grown in New Mexico or marked with a prominent "Not grown in New Mexico" disclaimer. Chile grown around the town are marketed under the name of the town, and are often sold fresh-roasted in New Mexico and nationwide in late summer and early autumn.

In 2013, a group of local growers formed a non-profit association and filed for a federal Certification mark to certify the regional origin of chile grown in the Hatch Valley.

==== Pueblo chile ====
Pueblo chile plants have been cultivated by the Puebloan peoples of New Mexico for centuries. The Acoma Pueblo chile is mild, with a lightly flavorful pungency. The Isleta Pueblo chile develops a fruity sweet flavor as it grows into its red chile state. The Zia Pueblo chile develops a bitter-sweet flavor when it matures into its red color, and its heat is similar to the 'Heritage 6-4'.

These ancient Pueblo varieties should not be confused with a chile grown in Pueblo, Colorado, also called "Pueblo chile", which is the green Numex Mirasol chile, another cultivar of the New Mexico chile.

=== Outside of New Mexico ===
==== California ====
The Anaheim pepper is a mild variety of the cultivar 'New Mexico No. 9' and commonly grown outside of New Mexico. It is related to the 'New Mexico No. 6 and 9', but when grown out of state, they have a higher variability rate. The name 'Anaheim' derives from Emilio Ortega, a farmer who brought the seeds from New Mexico to the Anaheim, California area in 1894. The chile "heat" of 'Anaheim' chile varies from 500 to 2,500 on the Scoville scale.

==== Colorado ====
In Colorado, 'Numex Mirasol' chile peppers are grown near the city of Pueblo, where they are known as "Pueblo chile". These should not be confused with the ancient chile varieties grown by the Puebloan peoples. The pepper variety was later named "Mosco".

==== Outer space ====
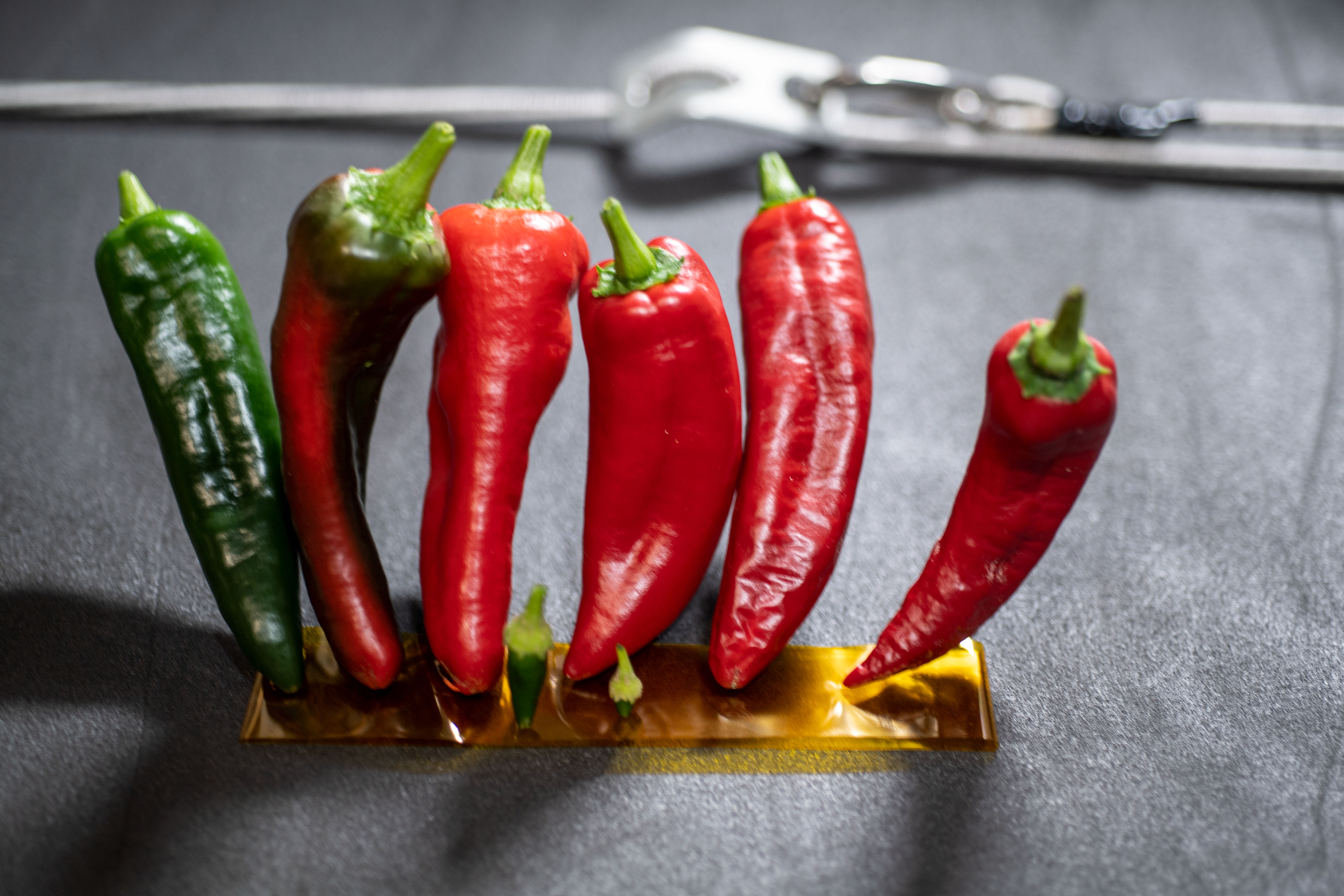
'Numex Española Improved' peppers grown on the International Space Station

On July 12, 2021, NASA astronauts aboard the International Space Station grew New Mexico chile variety 'Numex Española Improved' from seeds in a soilless media with fertilizer. These were the first Capsicum plants grown off Earth. Out of the 48 seeds planted, four were allowed to continue growing in a small unit. The chiles were harvested in October, and "space tacos" were prepared. A second harvest in December yielded 26 peppers, with 12 peppers returned to Earth for evaluation.

== Uses ==
=== Food ===
Half cup of hot green chile peppers
Nutritional value per 75 grams
- Energy: 30 kJ (7.2 kcal)
- Carbohydrates: 7.1 g
- Sugars: 3.82 g
- Dietary fiber: 1.1 g
- Fat: 0.15 g
- Saturated: 0.016 g
- Monounsaturated: 0.008 g
- Polyunsaturated: 0.082g
- Protein: 1.5 g
Vitamins and minerals
Vitamins	Quantity %DV^{†}
Vitamin A equiv. beta-Carotene lutein zeaxanthin	98% 884 μg 5% 503 μg 544 μg
Thiamine (B1)	6% 0.068 mg
Riboflavin (B2)	5% 0.068 mg
Niacin (B3)	4% 0.712 mg
Pantothenic acid (B5)	1% 0.046 mg
Vitamin B6	12% 0.209 mg
Folate (B9)	4% 17 μg
Vitamin C	202% 181.9 mg
Vitamin E	3% 0.52 mg
Vitamin K	9% 10.7 μg
Minerals	Quantity %DV^{†}
Calcium	1% 14 mg
Iron	5% 0.9 mg
Magnesium	5% 19 mg
Phosphorus	3% 35 mg
Potassium	9% 255 mg
Sodium	0% 5 mg
Zinc	2% 0.22 mg
- Other constituents: Quantity
- Water: 65.8 g
- Nutritional Information from the Chile Pepper Institute
- ^{†}Percentages estimated using US recommendations for adults, except for potassium, which is estimated based on expert recommendation from the National Academies.

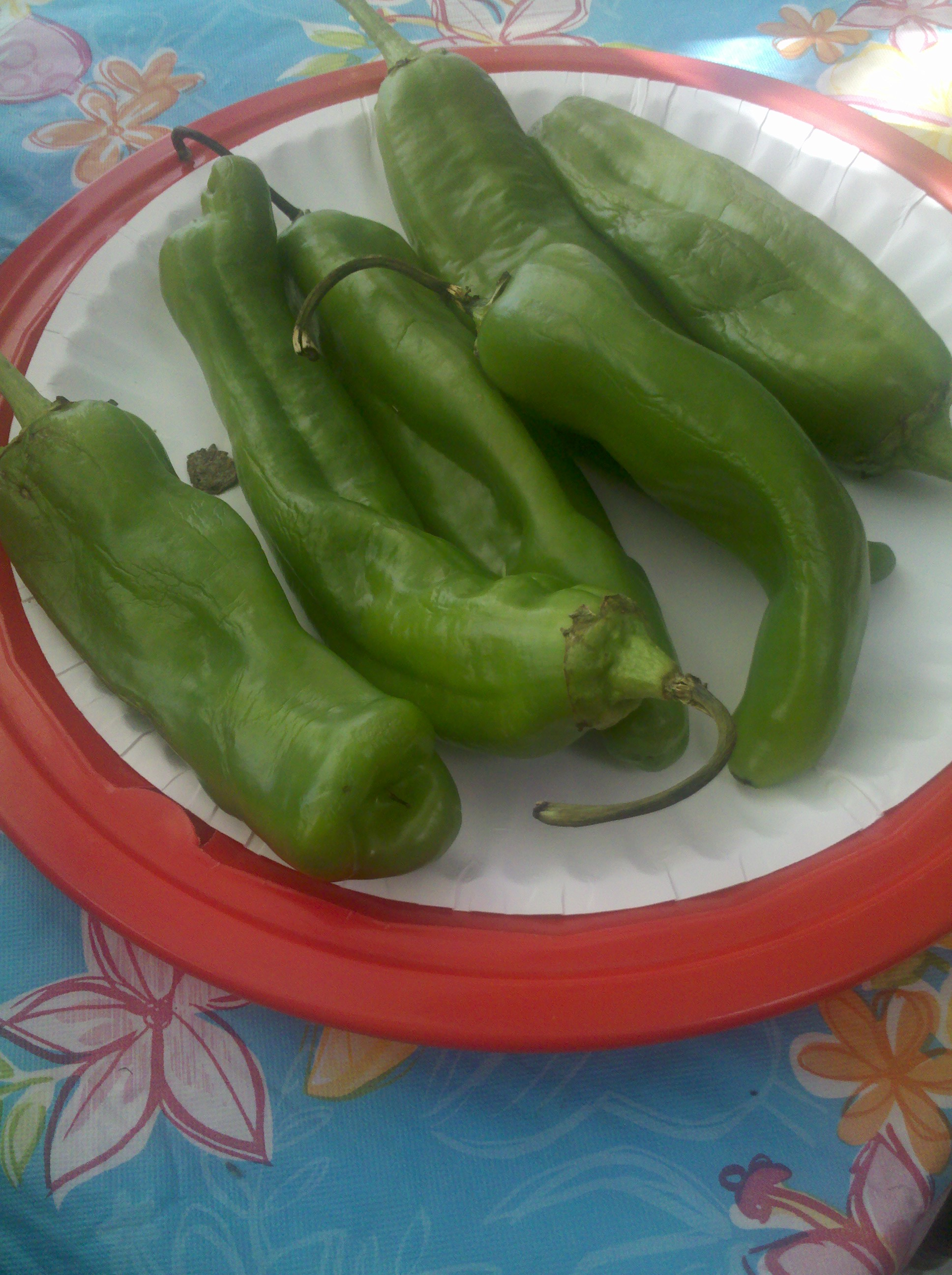
Green chile, unroasted

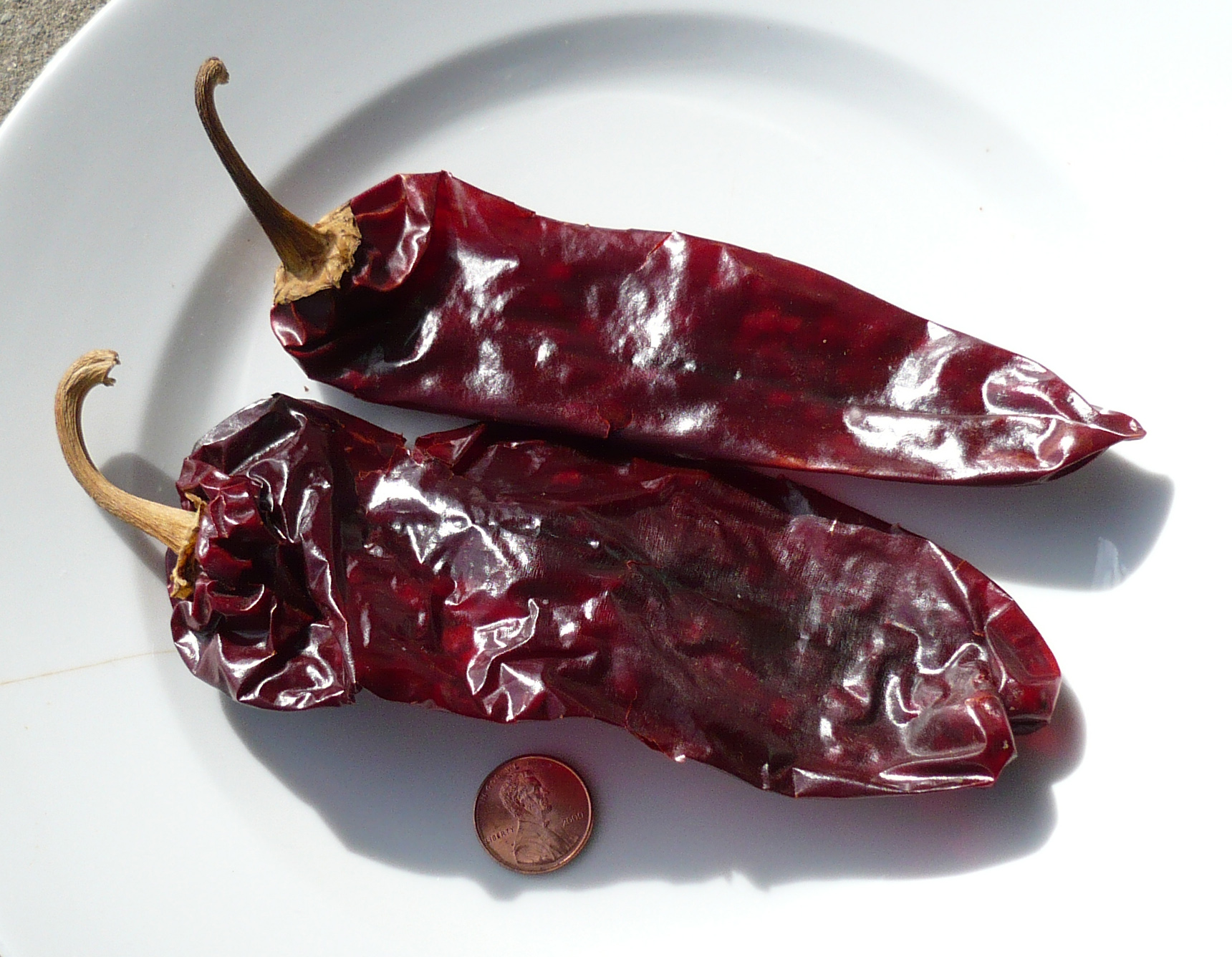
Red chile, dried, with a US penny for scale

Green chile is served roasted and peeled, whole or diced, as a powder, and in various sauces. It is most often served diced or in sauces, and is elemental to dishes such as enchiladas, burritos, burgers, french fries, or rice. Chile is also served whole raw, fried, or baked chiles rellenos. New Mexican-style chile rellenos follow the much more traditional Mexican technique of being covered with egg batter and fried, although variations and casseroles do exist.

The red chile (the mature green chile) is frequently dried and ground to a powder. These dried or powdered fruits are turned into a red chile sauce. The dried peppers are rehydrated by boiling in a pot, and then blended with various herbs and spices, such as onion, garlic, and occasionally Mexican oregano. Red chile powder is usually simply blended with water, herbs, and spices; the addition of flour or other thickening agents is often considered to be non-traditional or non-purist.

Serving both red and green chile on a dish is sometimes referred to as "Christmas" style. Both green and red chile can be dried and turned into a powder, though this is more common with red chile.

=== Vernacular art ===
Chile is used in the state to construct both decorative and functional ristras (arrangements of drying pepper pods) and chile wreaths. Some varieties have colorful fruit and are used as ornamental plants.

=== Industry ===
Some chile varieties such as 'NuMex Garnet' are used as a pigment stock to produce red dye.

== Economy ==
Ongoing drought, unpredictable weather, and environmental concerns have strained New Mexico's production of chile peppers, the state's primary agricultural produce.

In 2019, the average chile sales price was $793 per ton, and accounted for $50M in sales within New Mexico. Of the 1,644,000 short hundredweight (164,400,000 lb) of peppers produced in the United States in 2019, 1,261,000 short hundredweight (126,100,000 lb) were produced in New Mexico, or about 77% of US chile pepper production.

=== Harvest ===
Chile is planted in New Mexico in March and April, and harvested between July and October for green chile, and between October and December for red chile.

New Mexico chile production, 2010–2019
Year	Acres planted	Acres harvested
2010	9,150	8,700
2011	10,000	9,500
2012	9,900	9,600
2013	9,000	8,600
2014	8,100	7,700
2015	8,300	7,700
2016	9,200	8,700
2017	8,100	7,600
2018	8,400	7,900
2019	9,100	8,700

Harvest is done by both local farmhands and hired help, and in the Mesilla Valley by seasonal Mexican farmworkers who harvest the chile and then travel back to Mexico. Because the plants are delicate and produce fruits continuously until the frost, and because the pods are easily damaged, machine harvesting of chile is especially difficult. Currently, development, breeding, and engineering are being done to produce a successful chile harvester and machine-harvestable breeds. This puts a limit on the amount of chile that can be economically harvested in New Mexico even if water were unlimited.

Of 9,100 acres (3,700 ha) of chile crops planted in 2019, 8,700 were harvested; 5,000 acres (2,000 ha) were harvested as "all red". In 2019, New Mexico led the nation in chile production with 63,075 short tons (57,221 t) harvested.

=== New Mexico Certified Chile ===
A certification program was started in 2014, New Mexico Certified Chile, which certifies the growing and sale of New Mexican chile; restaurants and other vendors may display a "New Mexico Certified Chile" placard or window sticker. The program protects New Mexico chile consumers from falsely labeled products, while protecting farmers from potential diminished demand, which allows larger amounts of New Mexico chile to be grown within the state. When the program was first introduced, it had garnered some criticism, especially in regard to restrictions on farmers who have been growing chile plants from seed lineages more than 400 years old.

== Cultural impact ==
New Mexico chile has had a significant impact on New Mexico's cuisine, art, cultures, and even its legislature. Just as with the Zia sun symbol, the chile pepper and its shape, the red and green coloration, and even the silhouette of the fruit, has become a symbol of New Mexican cultural identity, and is featured prominently in both food and nonfood corporate logos, in public artworks, media, infrastructure (i.e. bridges, lamp posts, etc.) and traditions around the state.

New Mexico is the only state with an official State Question: "Red or green?" and a State Answer: "Red and green" or "Christmas". "Red or green?" refers to the choices of chile sauce typically offered at local restaurants and is usually asked as quoted. To answer "Christmas" is to choose both red and green on the same dish, an option originally suggested by waitress Martha Rotuno at Tia Sophia's restaurant in Santa Fe. Chile is also one of the official state vegetables of New Mexico and the scent of "roasting green chile" is the official state aroma. One of the official license plate designs in New Mexico, the Chile Plate, features red and green chile, and the tagline "Chile Capital of the World" in yellow type.

The lamp posts on Elephant Butte Dam's crest road were lit red and green, a reference to the dam and its reservoir being the source of irrigation and electricity for the chile-growing Hatch region. The New Mexico Department of Game and Fish's "Special Trout Waters" fishing water designations are listed as "Red Chile Waters", "Green Chile Waters", or "Xmas Chile Waters", depending on the restrictions in place at the trout fishing location.

The village of Hatch, New Mexico, in the Hatch Valley is the center of chile farming in the southwest, and bills itself as the "Chile Capital of the World". The village has hosted an annual "Chile Festival" every summer since 1971.

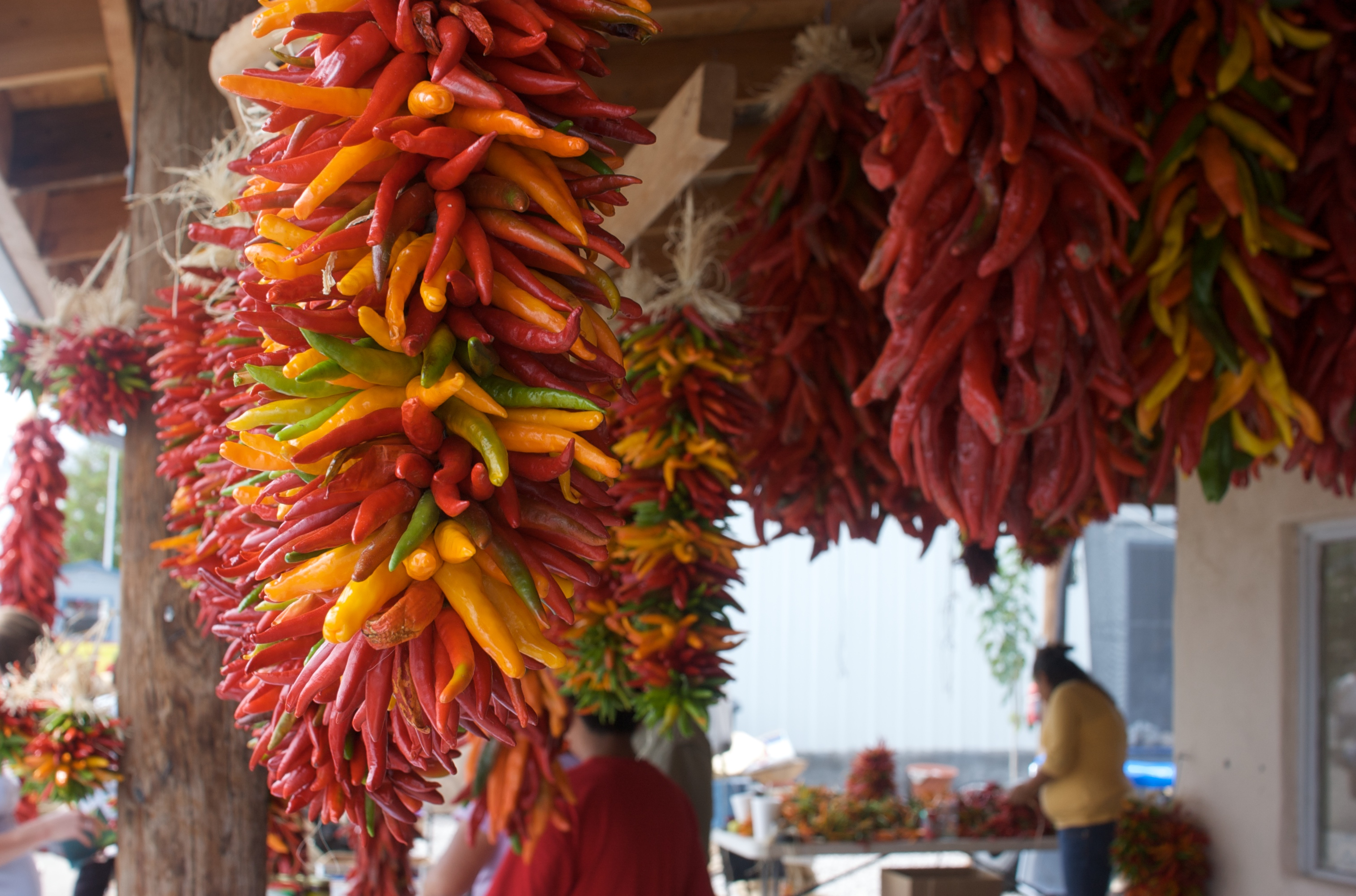
Ristras of varying pod types and ripeness

A ristra is an arrangement of drying chile pods. It is a popular decorative design in the state of New Mexico, and in media nationwide as a symbol of New Mexican culture. Some households still use ristras as a means to dry and procure red chile.

In addition to local restaurants, many national food chains such as Applebee's, Domino's Pizza, McDonald's, and Jack in the Box operating in New Mexico offer green chile on many of their menu items, bowing to local demand.

=== "Chile" versus "chili" ===
In modern everyday English in most of the world, chile, chili, and chilli all refer to the fruit of C. annuum; in Spanish, chile (chee-le), from Nahuatl chīlli, is used for the pepper. In New Mexican English, however, chile (chill-ee) refers to the fruit, while chili refers only to a meat-based dish known as Texas chili con carne. "Green chile chili" is chili con carne made with green chile. The word chile, as used in "green chile", "red chile", or by itself, is also used in lay terms to refer specifically to the New Mexico variety, while other varieties are referred to as peppers (e.g. jalapeño pepper, ghost pepper).

Many organizations, including farmers, breeders, consumers, and even the New Mexico Department of Tourism, make efforts to educate the general public about the differences in spelling within the state, as using chili while referring to New Mexican chile may be taken as an insult to some locals. US Senator Pete Domenici of New Mexico made this spelling official as chile for the fruit, by entering it into the Congressional Record.

None of these spellings should be confused with the nation of Chile (pronounced: CHEE-lay), which has a separate, unrelated etymology. (See: Etymology of Chile)

=== Roasting season ===
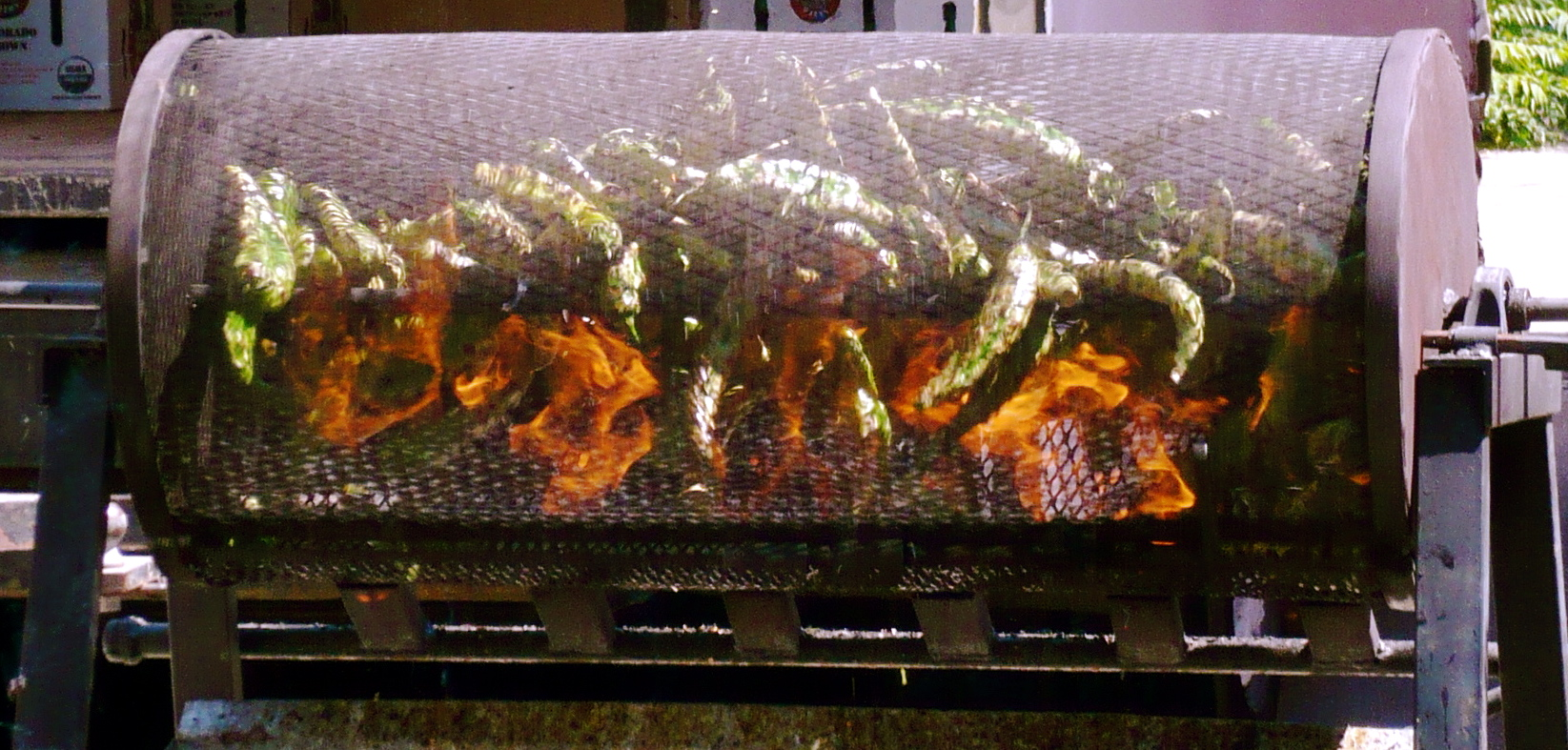
Chile roaster in operation

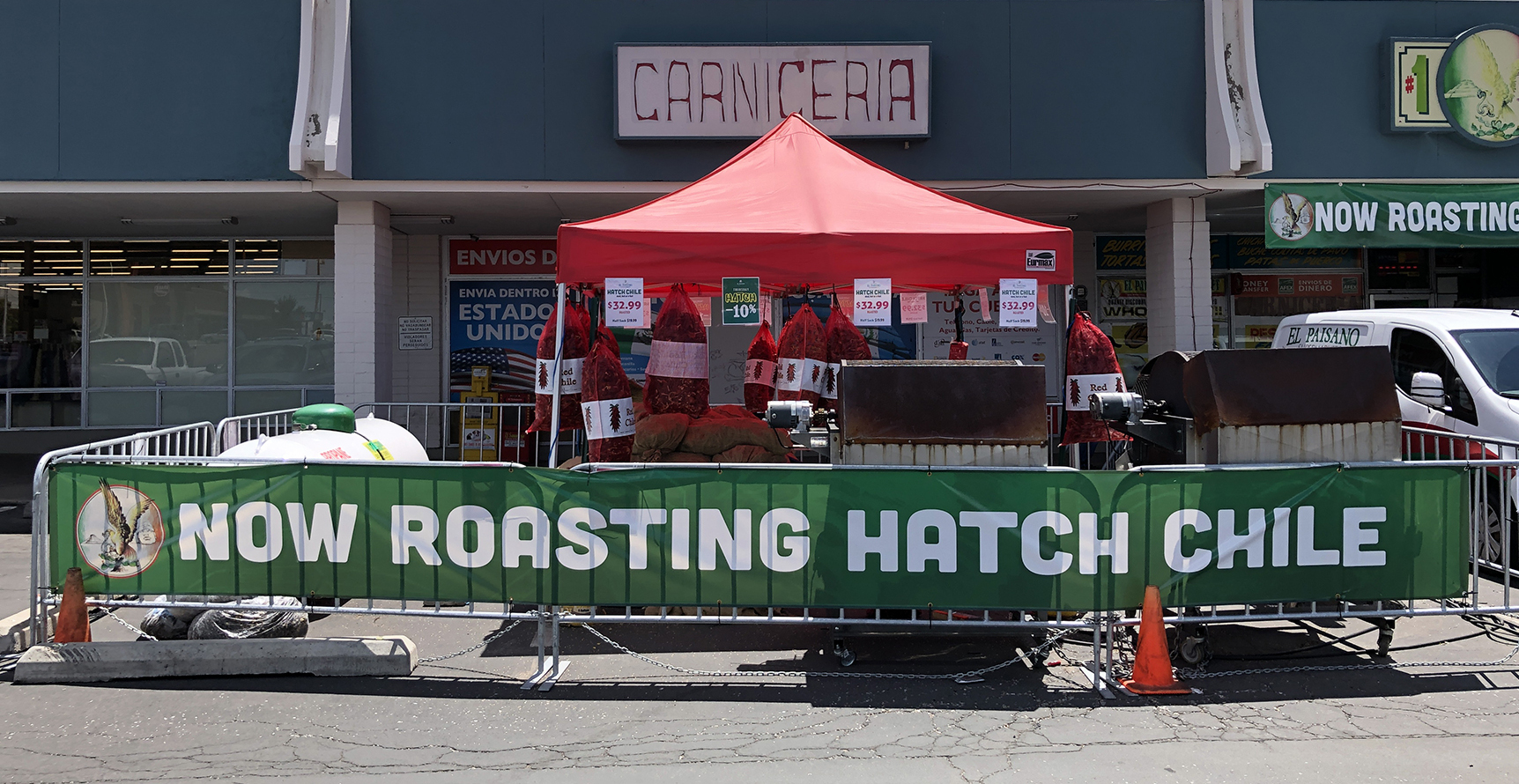
Street vendor roasting Hatch green chile in late summer, Santa Fe, New Mexico

The first crop of chile of the year usually arrives at retail in New Mexico and surrounding areas by August, which signals the start of "roasting season". Retail establishments around the state, including national chains such as Albertsons and Walmart, set up apparatuses called 'chile roasters' outside, and display signage advertising the availability of the fruit. A chile roaster consists of a drum with the long side of heavy gauge steel diamond mesh and the ends of thick plate steel discs, mounted horizontally on a frame over powerful propane burners. A shaft usually runs through the center of the drum to act as an axle, a design pioneered by Emilio Ortega while in California.

A customer's chile purchase (usually a standard-size produce box-full) is loaded into the cylinder by the retailer, who usually assumes a role also called a "chile roaster", via a hatch in the mesh side. The drum is then turned, either by motor or hand crank, and the chile tumbles within over the flames, ensuring the chile pods are heated on every side as they shed their skins; this ensures the chile skins blister appropriately to allow for easier peeling of the chile. Skins, seeds, and other debris fall through the bottom of the drum. This process is the most popular method since it offers a physical display of the chile; it offers the sound of the chile crackling, and the sight of the blistering and falling skins, accompanied by the widely distributed smell of the roasting peppers, which has become a staple during the early New Mexican autumn, as well as the state's official aroma. The skins of the roasted peppers are inedible, and peeling the chile to prepare them for freezer storage is a traditional family communal activity. Some people eat the fresh roasted chile as a snack, but the Chile Pepper Institute recommends cooking them to 165 °F (74 °C) before consuming to reduce the risk of foodborne pathogens.

Horno-roasting chile, while done less often, is a more traditional method. A more common method is simply roasting over an open flame on gas stove-tops and grills.

The chile roasting season in New Mexico lasts until the first freeze of the year, which usually occurs in late October. Sacks of green chile often contain many red chiles as it gets later in the season. This mixed chile is called autumn roast, or chile pintado in Spanish, and is a local favorite for many people.

== Cultivars and landraces ==
Though most New Mexico type peppers are long pod-type peppers, that ripen from green to red, the multitude of New Mexico type cultivars have a slight variance in taste, and widely varying appearances and heat levels. Some varieties may turn yellow, orange, or brown.

The most common New Mexico chile plants are the 'New Mexico 6-4', 'Big Jim', 'Sandia', 'No. 6', and 'No. 9' cultivars. The improved 'Heritage 6-4', 'Heritage Big Jim', and 'Sandia Select' cultivars provide a better yield. Peppers like the 'Chimayó', 'Velarde', 'Jemez', 'Escondida', 'Alcalde', 'San Felipe', 'Española', and several others, represent what is known as New Mexico's unique landrace chile, which provide their own tastes and usually make a higher price.

Cultivar	Description	Length	Width	Pod type	Scoville heat units
6-4	An heirloom variety developed by Fabián Garcia in 1957 by reducing the heat of 'New Mexico No. 6'.	6.6 inches (17 cm)	3.8 inches (9.7 cm)	New Mexican	~1,500
6–9	An heirloom variety developed by Fabián Garcia.			New Mexican	
Acoma	Pueblo chile grown in Acoma Pueblo.			New Mexican	
Alcalde	New Mexico landrace chile.			New Mexican	
Anaheim	Mild relative of 'NuMex no. 9', grown outside the state of New Mexico. Flavor and heat varies greatly.			New Mexican	500 ~ 2,500
Barker's Hot	The 'Barker's Hot' chile pepper is an exceptionally hot chile of the New Mexico pod type. The peppers ripen from green to red, with the red fruits being hotter than the green ones.	5–7 inches (13–18 cm)		New Mexican	15,000 ~ 30,000
Bailey Piquin	Heat level similar to habanero peppers. 'NuMex Bailey Piquin' is the first chile piquin cultivar that is machine-harvestable. They are used mainly for chile powder production. Released in 1991.			Piqiun	90,000 ~ 100,000
Big Jim	Jim Lytle worked with Nakayama and New Mexico State University (NMSU) to develop a hatch chile that was fondly named 'Big Jim'. This variety holds the record for the longest chile to date, which measured in at 17 inches (430 mm) in 2012.	7–17 inches (18–43 cm)	7–17 inches (18–43 cm)	New Mexican	500 ~ 3,000
Centennial	Primarily an ornamental variety; fruit are purple, then mature to yellow, orange, and red. Used in the potted plant industry. Released in 1998.	~1 inch (2.5 cm)		Piquin	1,000 ~ 5,000
Chimayó	A medium pepper, green before ripening to a dark, red color. This variety is a landrace historically grown in the foothills of the Southern Rockies near Chimayó, New Mexico. The peppers are small and curled, and have a complex flavor described as sweet and smoky.	4.5 inches (11 cm)		New Mexican	4,000 ~ 6,000
Conquistador	A very mild nonpiquant "paprika" pepper, green before ripening into a red color. 'NuMex Conquistador' is used for mass-produced chile rellenos. They descended from a population of open-air pollinated '6-4' plants.	6.18 inches (15.7 cm)	2.76 inches (7.0 cm)	New Mexican	0
Eclipse	Part of the 'Sunrise, Sunset, and Eclipse' pepper line released in 1998. They were created by crossing '6–4' with a green bell pepper, and are New Mexican pod type peppers that mature into colors other than red. 'NuMex Eclipse' matures into a brown color.	5.1 inches (13 cm)	1.9 inches (4.8 cm)	New Mexican	300 ~ 500
Escondida	New Mexico landrace chile from one of two places called "Escondida" (Spanish for 'hidden') near Socorro, New Mexico, making it the southernmost landrace chile in New Mexico, however, it no longer grows in its home soil.	2.18 inches (5.5 cm)	0.65 inches (1.7 cm)	New Mexican	15,057
Española	An old chile pod, has a slightly stronger pungent and bitter flavor and matures early to red, first grown by the Spanish settlers in the San Juan Valley, near modern-day Española.	4.9 inches (12 cm)	1.5 inches (3.8 cm)	New Mexican	1,500 ~ 2,000
Española Improved	Hybridization of Sandia and Española. Provides Española's taste and early maturation, with a better yield, and larger peppers. 'Numex Española Improved' was the first chile pepper cultivar to be grown and harvested in space.	6.0 inches (15 cm)	1.75 inches (4.4 cm)	New Mexican	1,500 ~ 2,000
Fresno	Related to Santa Fe Grande, fruit grows upright and matures to orange and red. Moderately spicy.	2.0 inches (5.1 cm)	1.0 inch (2.5 cm)	Santa Fe Grande	2,500 ~ 10,000
Garnet	Insect-proof machine-harvestable candidate paprika with low heat and high extractable pigment, used mainly for dye production. Released in 2004.	6.2 inches (16 cm)	1.5 inches (3.8 cm)	New Mexican	150 ~ 160
Heritage 6-4	A 200-seed sample of the original 'New Mexico 6-4', obtained from the Plant Germplasm Preservation Research Unit (PGPRU) at the National Center for Genetic Resources Preservation, in Ft. Collins, Colorado. The PGPRU received the seed in 1962 and placed it in cryogenic storage. The flavor of the plant was rehabilitated from these seeds.	6.7 inches (17 cm)	3.7 inches (9.4 cm)	New Mexican	1,559
Heritage Big Jim	Grown from seeds obtained from the National Seed Storage Lab, 'NuMex Heritage Big Jim' are more uniform in form and piquancy than current 'Big Jim' varieties.	7–12 inches (18–30 cm)		New Mexican	9,482
Holiday Ornamentals	Upright Ornamental peppers. Released in 2004. Includes 'NuMex Valentine's Day,' 'NuMex St. Patrick's Day,' 'NuMex Memorial Day,' 'NuMex Halloween,' 'NuMex Thanksgiving' and 'NuMex Christmas'.	Various	Various	Piquin	Various
Isleta	Pueblo chile grown near the Rio Grande Bosque around the Pueblo of Isleta.	4–5 inches (10–13 cm)		New Mexican	
Jemez Pueblo	New Mexico landrace and pueblo chile with a high red-to-green ratio, grown near Jemez Pueblo. About a teaspoon of seeds are planted in a single hole and mixed with manure. They mature early compared to other landrace varieties.			New Mexican	
Joe E. Parker	Thicker walled '6-4', with a heat variance based on growing conditions; 149 days to maturity. Named after NMSU Graduate Joe E Parker, it was released in 1990.	6.5 inches (17 cm)	2.0 inches (5.1 cm)	New Mexican	800 ~ 900
Luci Fairy					30,000 ~ 50,000
Mirasol	Named for the upright posture of the fruit that "points" to the sun; mirasol is Spanish for "looking at the sun". 'Numex Mirasol' was created by crossing 'La Blanca' and 'Santaka' peppers and selecting for upright fruit; also grown in Colorado where they are marketed as "Pueblo chile". Released in 1993.	2.17 inches (5.5 cm)	0.75 inches (1.9 cm)	Mirasol	0 ~ 30,000
Nematador	'NuMex Nematador' is an open-pollinated, nematode resistant, cayenne-type chile that was released in 2003.	5.8 inches (15 cm)	0.6 inches (1.5 cm)	Cayenne	15,500 ~ 16,000
No. 6	An heirloom variety developed in 1950 by Roy Harper. 'New Mexico No. 6' was bred from "a selection made in 1947 from an undesignated local chile".	6–8 inches (15–20 cm)	2 inches (5.1 cm)	New Mexican	700 ~ 900
No. 9	An heirloom variety developed by Fabián García. They were bred to be milder to increase consumption by Anglo settlers. Garcia selected 14 varieties from tree pod types, pasilla, colorado, and negro, to create new varieties. After nine years of breeding, only 'No. 9' remained. It was the very first New Mexican pod type chile.			New Mexican	1,000 ~ 1,500
Piñata	A cultivar of the 'early jalapeño', it spontaneously originated in the field due to a single recessive gene resulting in coloration changes to the plant and its fruit. Matures to yellow, orange, and red. Released in 1998.			Jalapeño	35,000 ~ 50,000
Primavera	Relatively yet uniformly mild jalapeño variety introduced in 1998.	2 inches (5.1 cm)	1 inch (2.5 cm)	Jalapeño	8,500 ~ 9,000
R Naky	Developed by Roy Nakayama in 1985, from a mix of the 'Rio Grande', '6-4', and 'Bulgarian Paprika', and "an early-maturing native type".	5.5 inches (14 cm)	1–2 inches (2.5–5.1 cm)	New Mexican	260 ~ 760
Rio Grande		4–6 inches (10–15 cm)		New Mexican	2,500 ~ 5,000
Rio Grande 21	Large mild pepper, created from a cross between 'No. 6' and 'Anaheim', 'Rio Grande 21' is not as widely grown as other cultivars. Released in 1967.	6.7 inches (17 cm)	1.73 inches (4.4 cm)	New Mexican	500 ~ 700
San Felipe	New Mexico landrace chile from San Felipe Pueblo.	1.94 inches (4.9 cm)	0.68 inches (1.7 cm)	New Mexican	15,370
Sandia	Released by Roy Harper in 1956 by cross breeding a 'NuMex No. 9' type with a Californian Anaheim-type chile. Originally named "Sandia A". Released in 1956.	6.6 inches (17 cm)	1.7 inches (4.3 cm)	New Mexican	1,500 ~ 2,000
Sandia Select	Improved 'Sandia' pepper to provide a spicier fruit with better yield and uniformity.	6–7 inches (15–18 cm)	1–2 inches (2.5–5.1 cm)	New Mexican	20,000 ~30,000
Santo Domingo	New Mexico landrace chile grown in Kewa Pueblo.	3 inches (7.6 cm)	0.86 inches (2.2 cm)	New Mexican	16,969
Suave Orange	Part of the 'Numex Suave' line of mild C. chinense peppers released in 2004. Their ancestry is unknown, but it is inferred that they contain local landrace heritage based on size.	1–2.5 inches (2.5–6.4 cm)	1–2 inches (2.5–5.1 cm)	Habanero	774
Suave Red	Part of the 'Numex Suave' line of mild C. chinense peppers.	1–2.5 inches (2.5–6.4 cm)	1–2 inches (2.5–5.1 cm)	Habanero	335
Sunburst	Part of the 'Sunglo, Sunflare, and Sunburst' pepper line released in 1991. They are peppers of de Arbol pod type and were created for ornamental use. They are used to make miniature wreaths and miniristras.'NuMex Sunburst' matures to orange color.	2.78 inches (7.1 cm)	0.5 inches (1.3 cm)	de Arbol	(Mainly used as ornamental)
Sunflare	Part of the 'Sunglo, Sunflare, and Sunburst' pepper line. 'NuMex Sunflare' matures to a red color.	2.87 inches (7.3 cm)	0.4 inches (1.0 cm)	de Arbol	(Mainly used as ornamental)
Sunglo	Part of the 'Sunglo, Sunflare, and Sunburst' pepper line. 'NuMex Sunglo' matures to a yellow color.	3.26 inches (8.3 cm)	0.54 inches (1.4 cm)	de Arbol	(Mainly used as ornamental)
Sunrise	Part of the 'Sunrise, Sunset, and Eclipse' pepper line; 'NuMex Sunrise' matures into a yellow color.	7.1 inches (18 cm)	1.5 inches (3.8 cm)	New Mexican	300 ~ 500
Sunset	Part of the 'Sunrise, Sunset, and Eclipse' pepper line; 'NuMex Sunset' matures into an orange color.	6 inches (15 cm)	1 inch (2.5 cm)	New Mexican	300 ~ 500
Sweet	High yield, low heat cultivar selected from a single plant in a field of open pollinated '6-4', a spicy variety. 'NuMex Sweet' was released in 1990.			New Mexican	200 ~ 300
Taos	Pueblo chile grown in the foothills of the Taos Mountains near Taos Pueblo.			New Mexican	
Twilight	Ornamental variety that matures purple, yellow, orange, and then red in 216 days. 'NuMex Twilight' is important to the potted plant industry for its ornamental value, and to breeders for its resistance to the cucumber mosaic virus.			Piquin	(Mainly used as ornamental)
Valverde	New Mexico landrace chile.			New Mexican	
Vaquero	Open pollinated jalapeño variety that "has good jalapeño flavor with sweet walls." Due to its susceptibility to Phytophthora capsici, 'Numex Vaquero' was released to farmers in 1991, but not as a "tolerant cultivar".	2.5 inches (6.4 cm)	0.9 inches (2.3 cm)	Jalapeño	25,000 ~ 30,000
XX Hot	Developed at New Mexico State University by The Chile Pepper Institute, 'NuMex XX Hot' Peppers are slim with thin walls and smooth skin.	3–5 inches (7.6–12.7 cm)		New Mexican	60,000 ~ 70,000
Zia	Pueblo chile grown near Zia Pueblo.			New Mexican	
