= Fabián García =

Mexican-American horticulturist

- García at NMSU in 1894
- Born: January 20, 1871; Chihuahua, Mexico
- Died: August 6, 1948 (aged 77); Las Cruces, New Mexico, US
- Citizenship: United States
- Education: New Mexico State University
- Known for: New Mexico chile
- Spouse: Julieta Amador (m. 1907; died 1920)
- Awards: Inducted into the National Agricultural Center and Hall of Fame (2019)
- Scientific career
- Fields: Horticulture
- Institutions: New Mexico State University

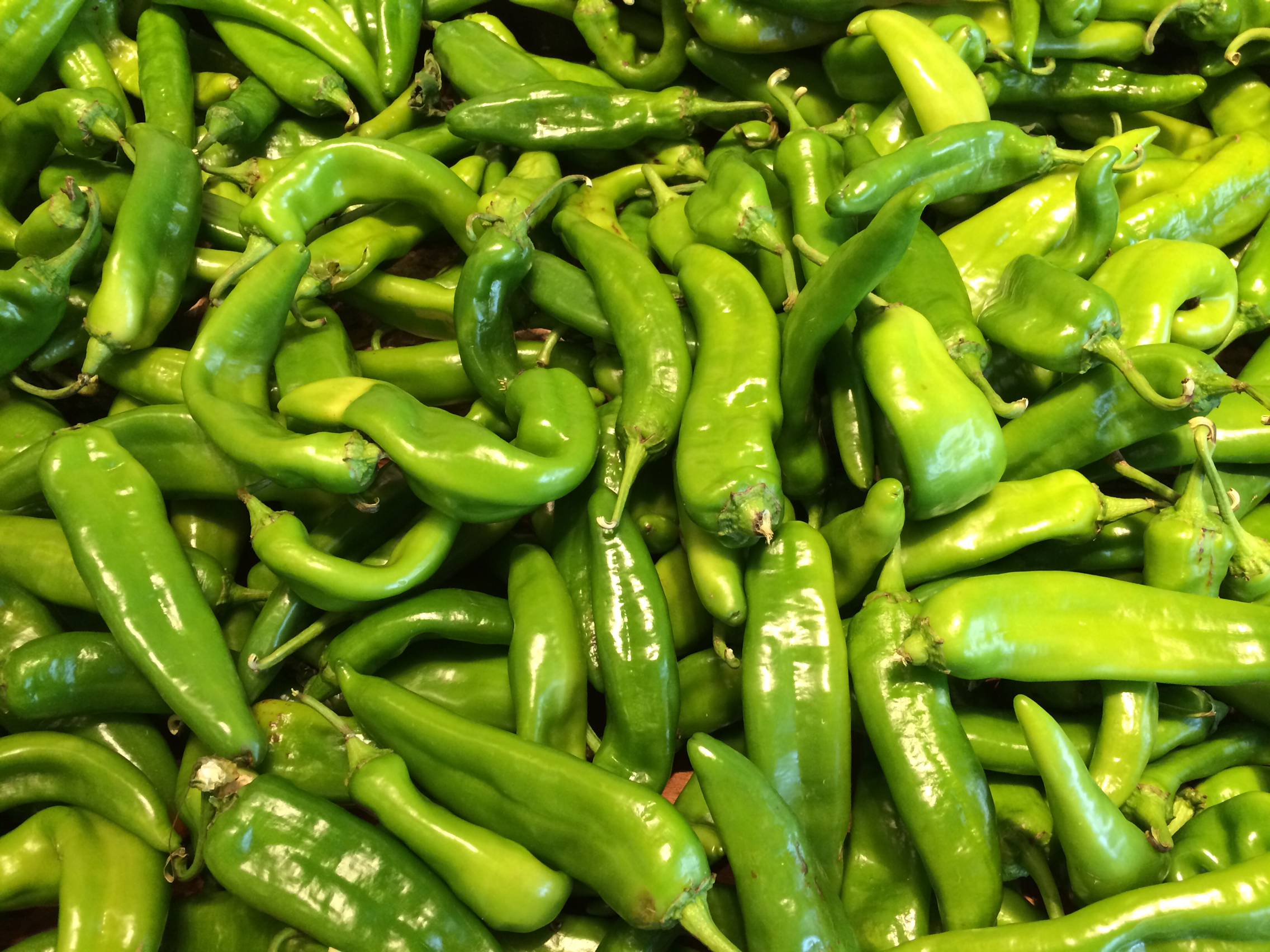
New Mexico green chiles

Fabián García (January 20, 1871 – August 6, 1948) was a Mexican-American horticulturist who has been described as "the father of the New Mexican food industry". Among other things, he helped to develop new varieties of chile peppers, pecans, and onions that are still grown in New Mexico. For example, in 1921, he introduced the "New Mexico No. 9", a strain of chile pepper which became the genetic ancestor of all New Mexico chiles.

== Early life and education ==
García was born in Chihuahua, Mexico, on January 20, 1871, to Ricardo García and Refugio Romero de García. He became an orphan at the age of two. He then moved to the U.S. Territory of New Mexico with his paternal grandmother, Jacoba García. He originally lived in the Mimbres Valley in the southwestern part of the state, but he and his grandmother later moved to the Mesilla Valley. In 1889, he became a naturalized citizen of the United States, and in 1890, he began taking classes at the New Mexico College of Agriculture and Mechanic Arts (NMA&MA, now known as New Mexico State University). García was a member of the school's first graduating class in 1894, receiving a Bachelor of Science degree that year. He went on to attend Cornell University to do graduate research in the 1899–1900 academic year before returning to the New Mexico College of Agriculture and Mechanic Arts, where he received his master's degree in 1905 or 1906.

== Academic career ==
García became the first director of the Agricultural Experiment Station at New Mexico College of Agriculture and Mechanic Arts in 1913 or 1914. He also became a professor of horticulture at the college in 1906. For many years, he was the only faculty member of Mexican descent at the college. According to New Mexico State University, when García became director of the Station, he also became "the first Hispanic in the nation to lead a land-grant agricultural research station." Later in his career, he began providing rooms to Mexican-American students at the college in the horticulture farm on campus. He retired from NMA&MA in 1945 after becoming ill.

== Personal life and death ==
García married Julieta Amador, a member of a prominent Mimbres Valley family, in 1907. They remained married until her death in 1920; García never remarried. He died on August 6, 1948, at McBride’s Hospital in Las Cruces, New Mexico, three years after being diagnosed with Parkinson's disease. He left his entire estate to New Mexico State University, including $89,000 toward the construction of a dormitory on campus for Hispanic students, and to provide scholarships to these students. The resulting dormitory, Fabián García Memorial Hall, was dedicated on October 17, 1949. In explaining why he left his estate to the university, he said, "I want to help poor boys, for I know their hardship."

== Recognition and legacy ==
The Fabián García Science Center at New Mexico State University is named after Garcia, as are the university's Center for International Programs, Garcia Hall, and the building containing their Center for International Programs. In 2005, García was inducted into the American Society for Horticultural Science Hall of Fame. In 2019, he became the first Hispanic and the first New Mexican to be inducted into the National Agricultural Center and Hall of Fame.

The Fabián García Collection, consisting of his papers, correspondence, manuscripts, notebooks, speeches and additional materials, is held in the New Mexico State University Library Archives and Special Collections. The archive also contains his professional papers, business documents, and a selection of photographs.
