= Adobada =

Mexican dish

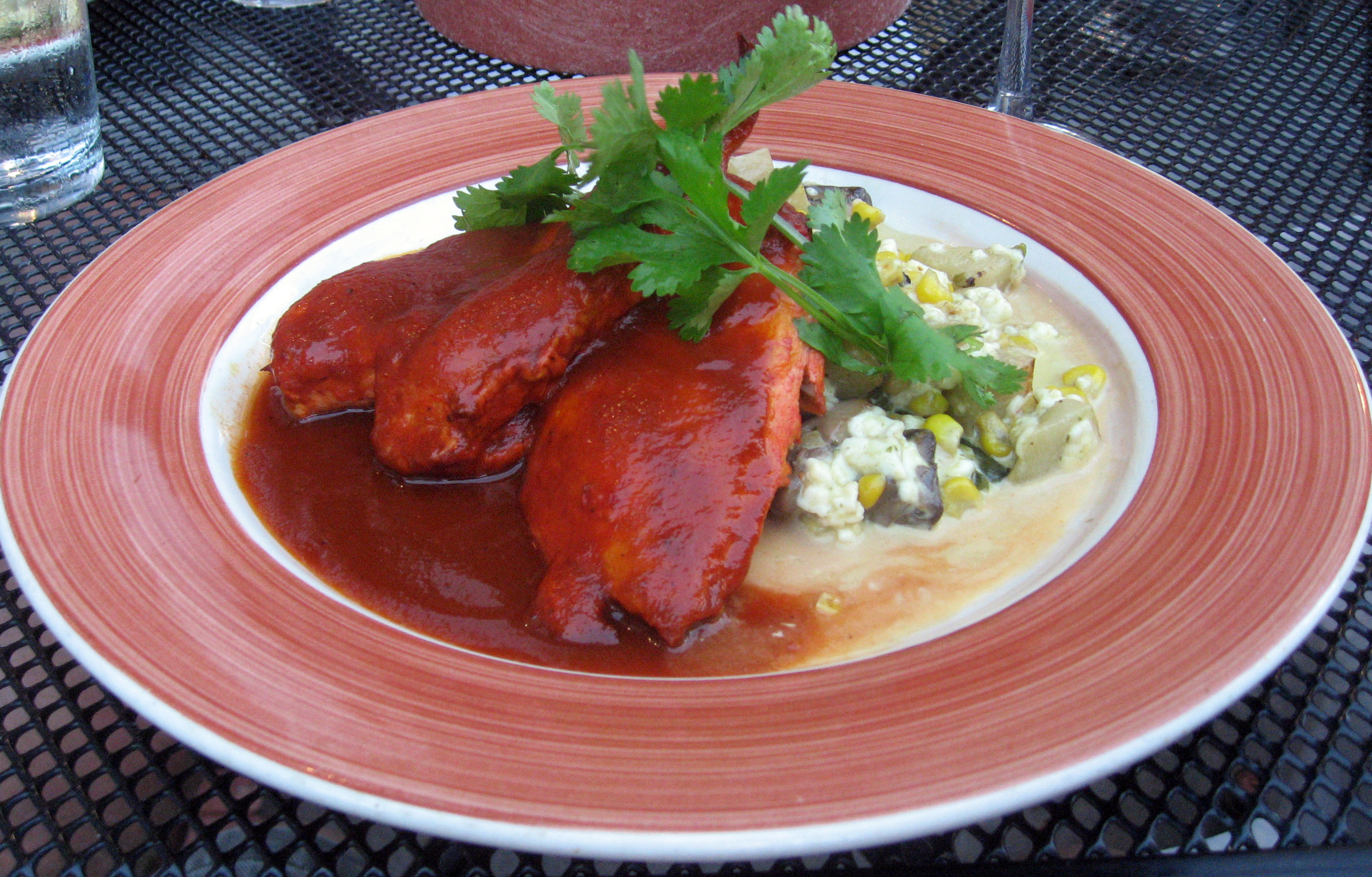
Pechuga adobada

Adobada (Spanish for "marinated") is a preparation for many dishes that are common in Mexican cuisine. Adobada is generally pork marinated in a "red" chili sauce with vinegar and oregano, but it can refer to different types of meat and to marinades closer to al pastor. It is generally served on small, pliable maize tortilla along with sautéed vegetables and cheese.

== New Mexico ==
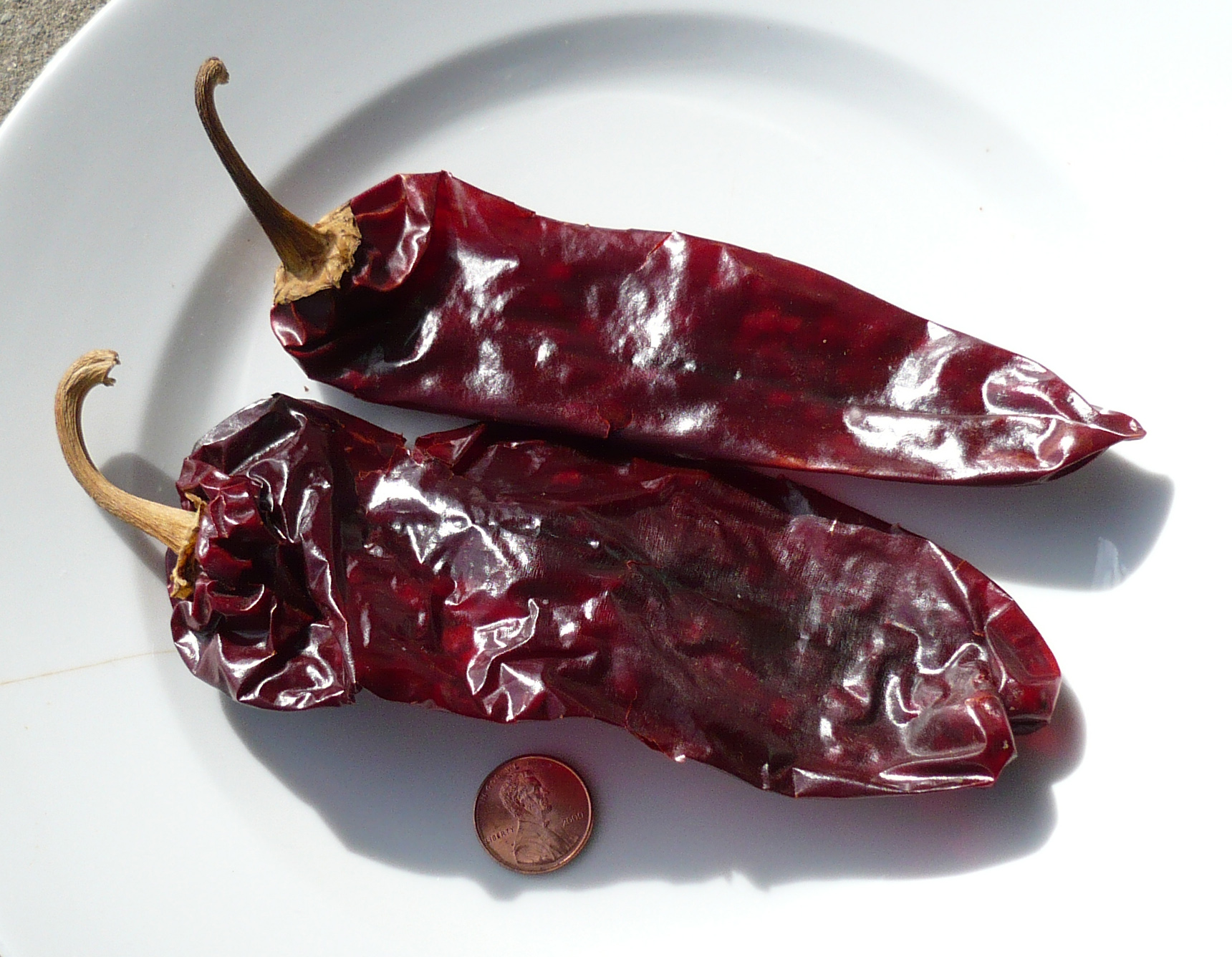
New Mexico red chili peppers

"Carne adovada" is a baked meat dish that is a specialty in New Mexican cuisine. In its simplest form, raw pork is cut into strips or cubes and placed in a large plastic bag with New Mexico red chile powder or minced red chile peppers (Hatch, Chimayo, or guajillo chili peppers), garlic, oregano, cumin, lime/lemon juice and/or vinegar, and salt, then mixed and refrigerated overnight. The dish is cooked by baking at low heat wrapped completely in foil or in a covered dish like a casserole dish to keep the meat moist.

The southern New Mexican version is usually pork cut into strips and chunks. Historically, before refrigeration, the pork was fermented in red chile in a crock using lactobacillus bacteria cultures. Fermented meat was a way of preservation and imparted a "sour" taste to the pork which explains why some modern New Mexican adovada recipes call for a bit of white vinegar or lemon/lime juice. The red chile is prepared "con pellejo" with bits of the chile skin using spices of fresh minced garlic and mortar and pestle ground oregano. Comino (cumin), cilantro, and coriander seeds, that may or may not be toasted, are optional. The dish is then baked until the meat is tender, moist and succulent on the inside while encrusted with a semidry and crisp red chile exterior that is almost blackened. Other versions of red chile and boiled or braised pork may be claimed as carne adovada. Other versions of red chile and pork-skin pellejo are actually what is known as chile Colorado. Carne adovada may be served with a tortilla, beans and rice, fideos or homefries, or papas with a fresh vinegar slaw or salad.

Another version is found in central New Mexico. Chunks of pork are dipped in milk and rolled in a dry rub of red chile con pellejo, garlic powder, salt, and cumin. These are tossed into a large fry pot with chicharrones and deep fried until crisp on the outside and tender and succulent inside.

== Mexico ==
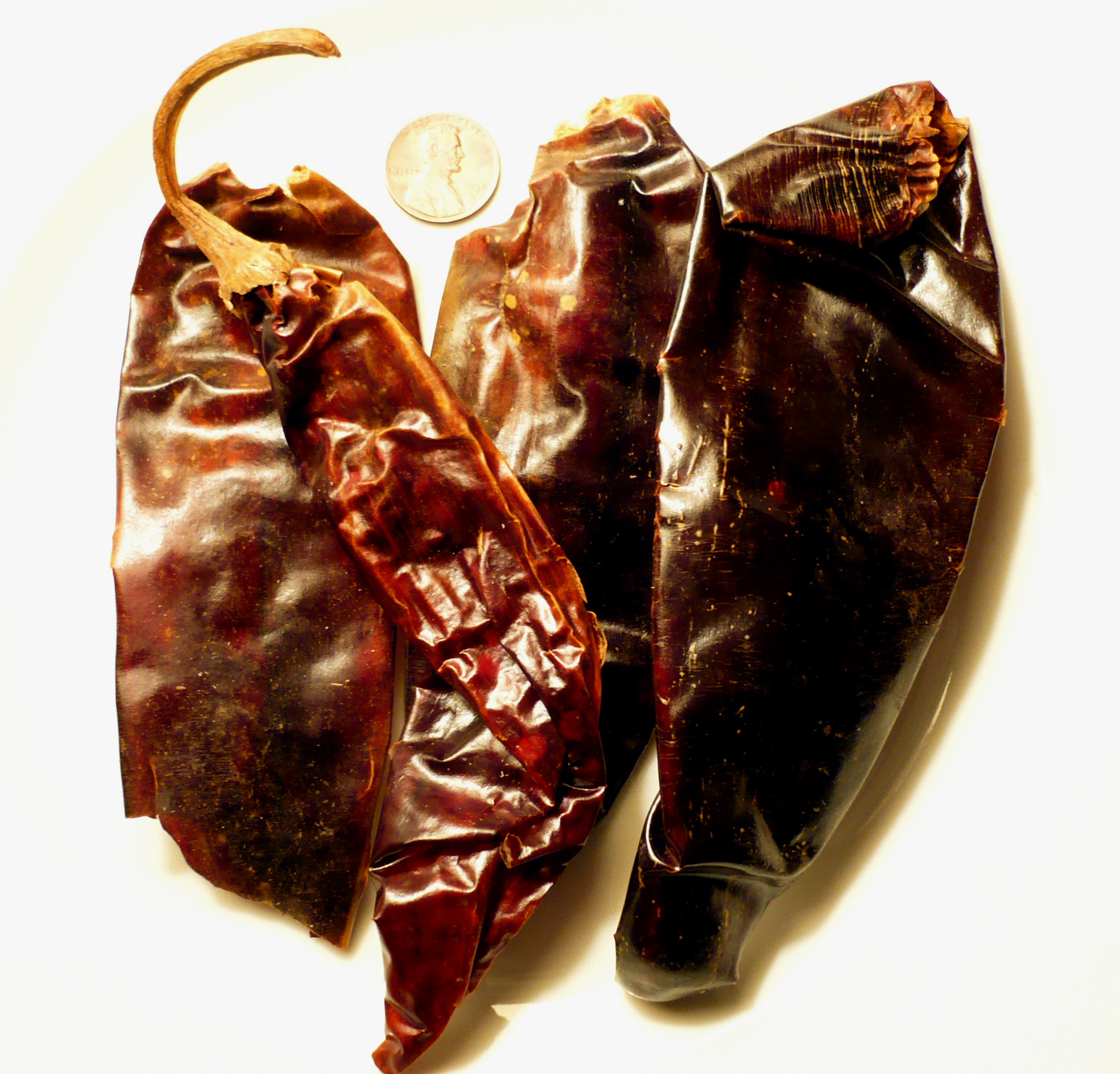
Mexican guajillo chilies

In certain states in Mexico, carne adobada refers to marinated pork meat. It is a very common ingredient for tacos, in the area of Colima, Jalisco and Michoacán states. In some parts of the state of Guerrero, it is known as "carne enchilada" which means chili dressed meat. In the "Huasteca" area (San Luis Potosí, Tampico, Veracruz and Hidalgo) it may be called "cecina enchilada". Cecina stands for the thin cut steaks. Most of the Mexican variations of adobada use guajillo or chipotle chiles for the marinade, both of which can be hot and spicy.

The combination of spices, chiles, and vinegar used for the marinade is called "adobo". Numerous recipes and regional variations for the adobo seasoning impart different flavors to carne adobada. Many carne adobada recipes from Mexico use the spices allspice, cinnamon, cloves, bay leaf, and/or nutmeg, which are not typically used in the New Mexico-style dish.

== Gallery ==
Adobada variations

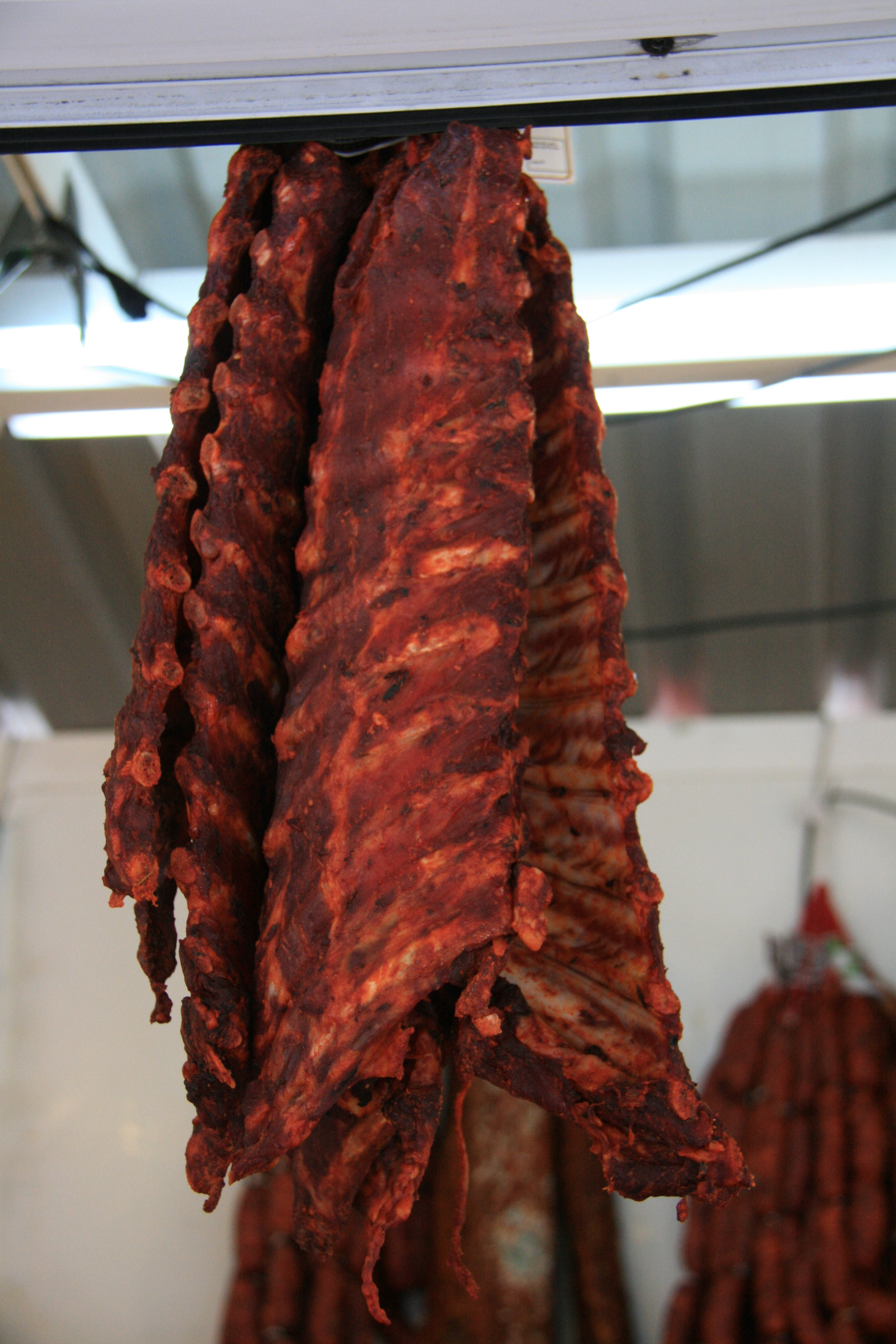
Costilla adobada

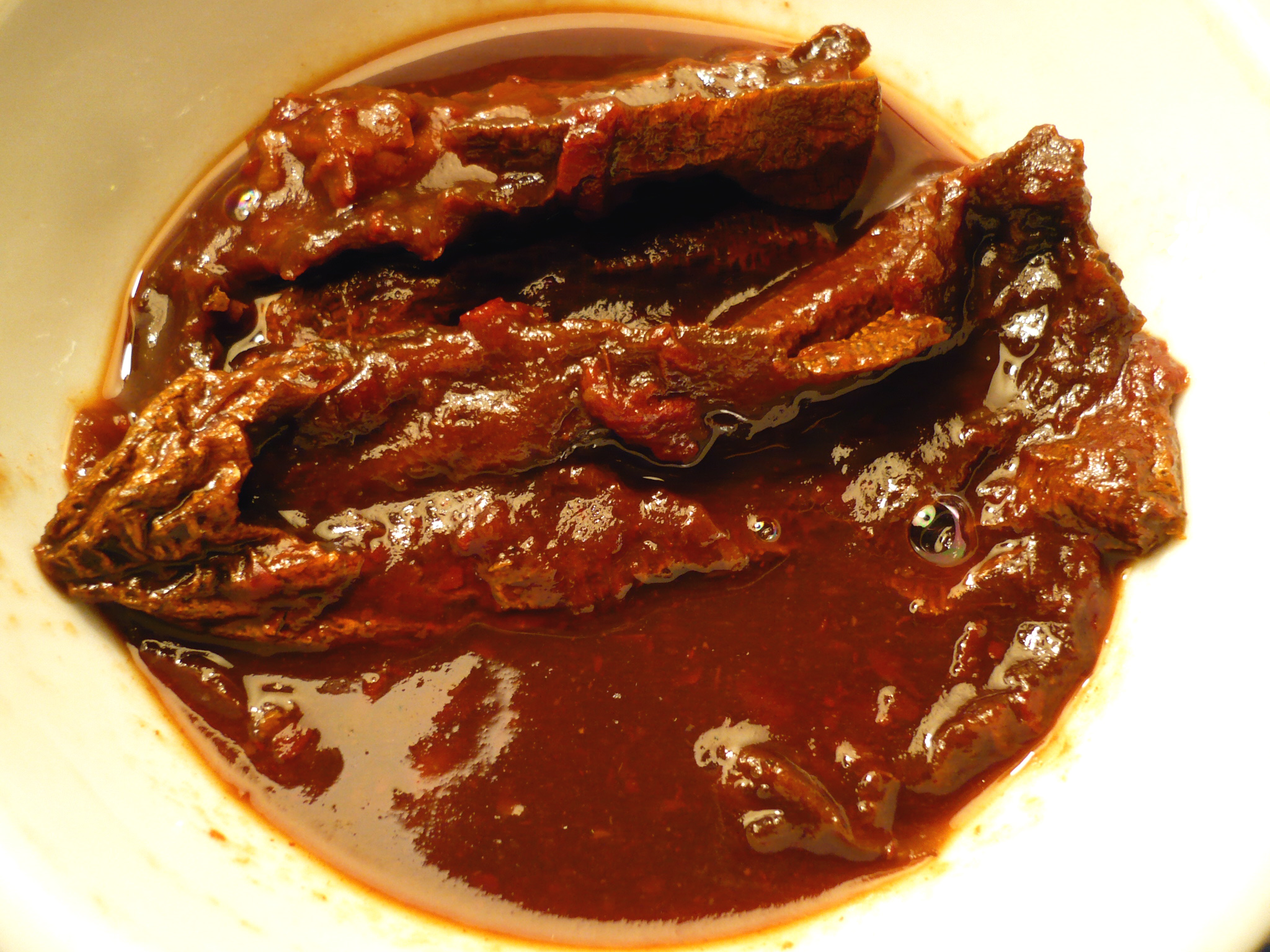
Chipotle adobada marinade

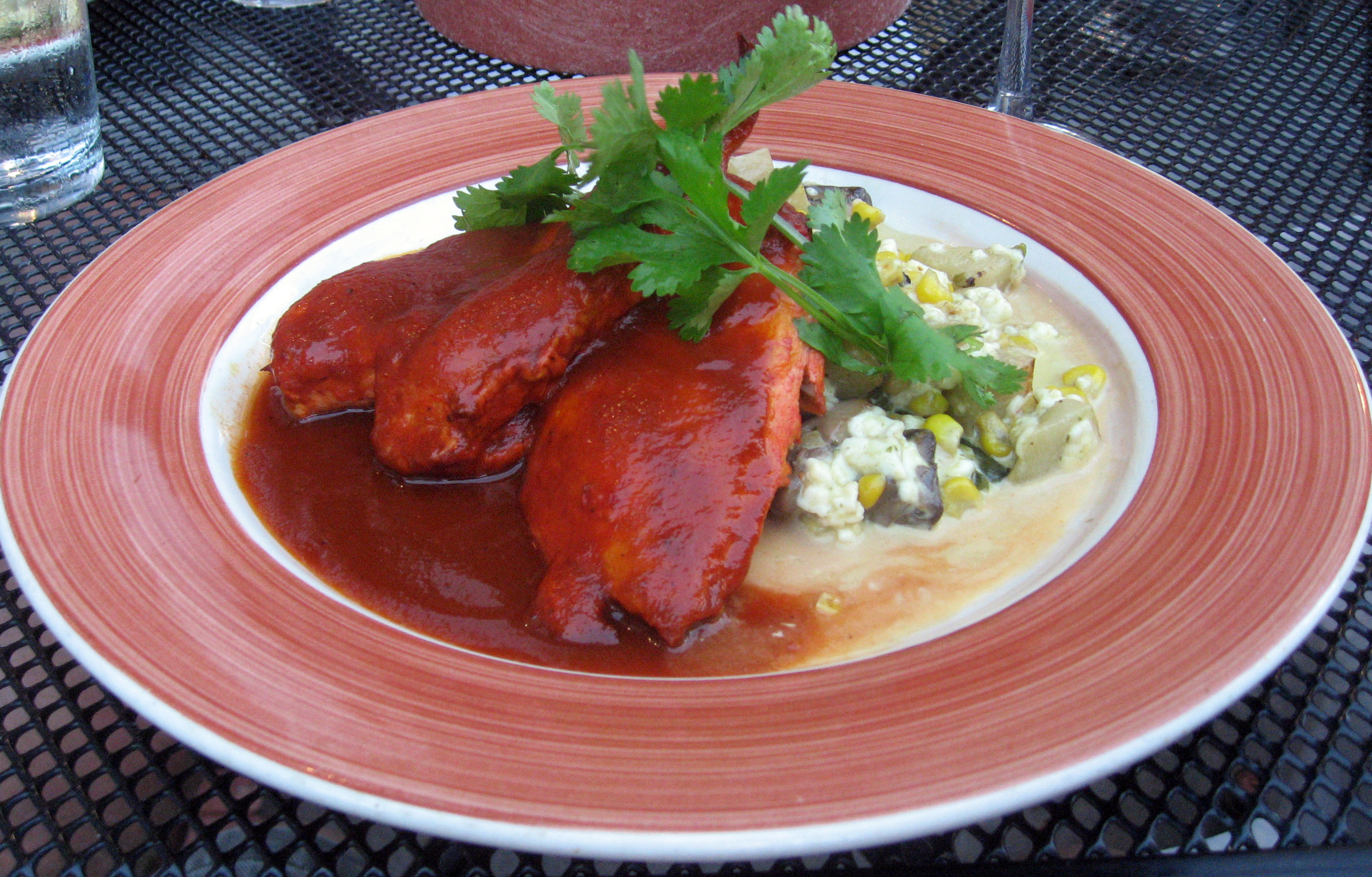
Chicken breast adobada

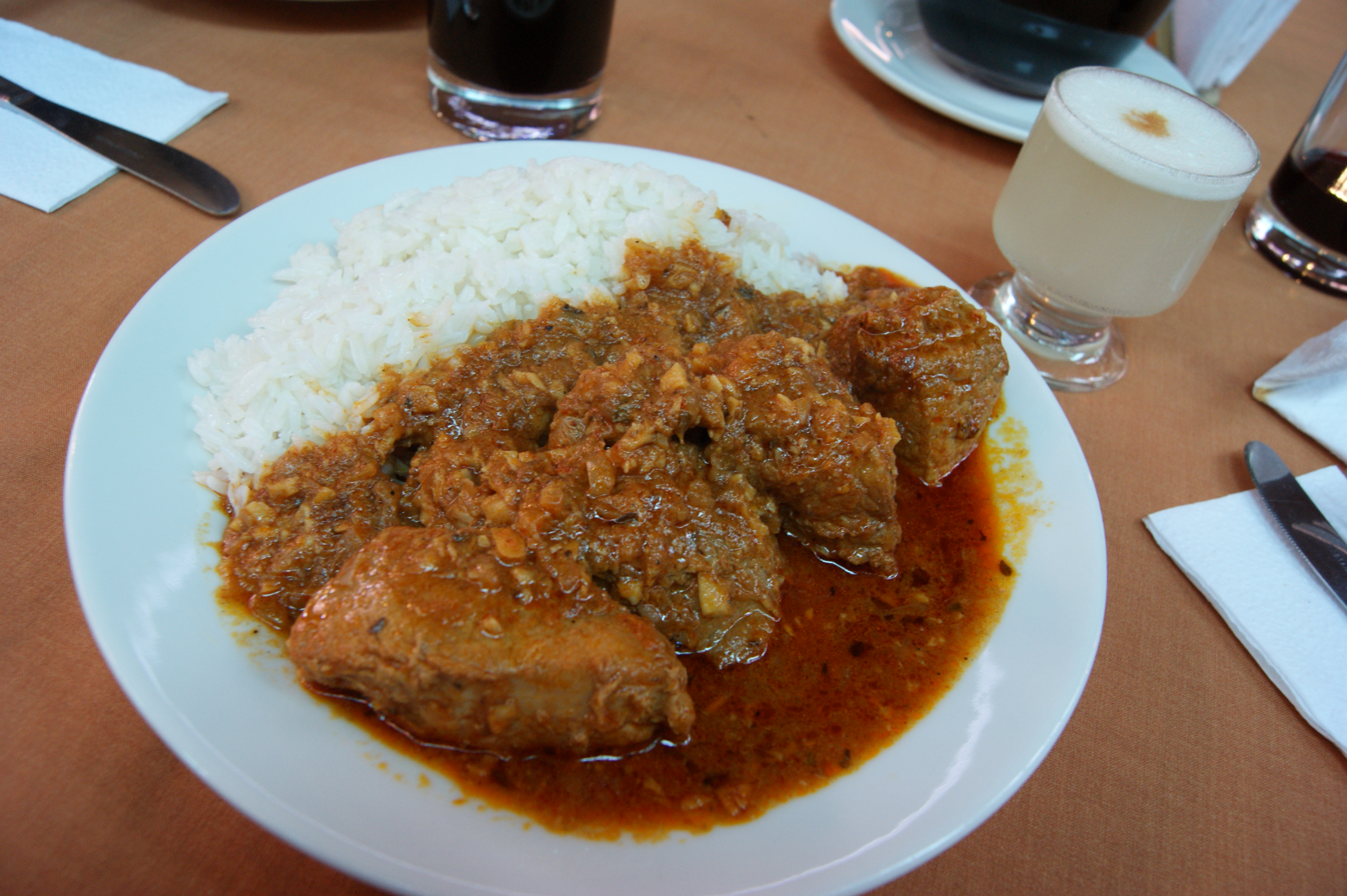
Pork adobada

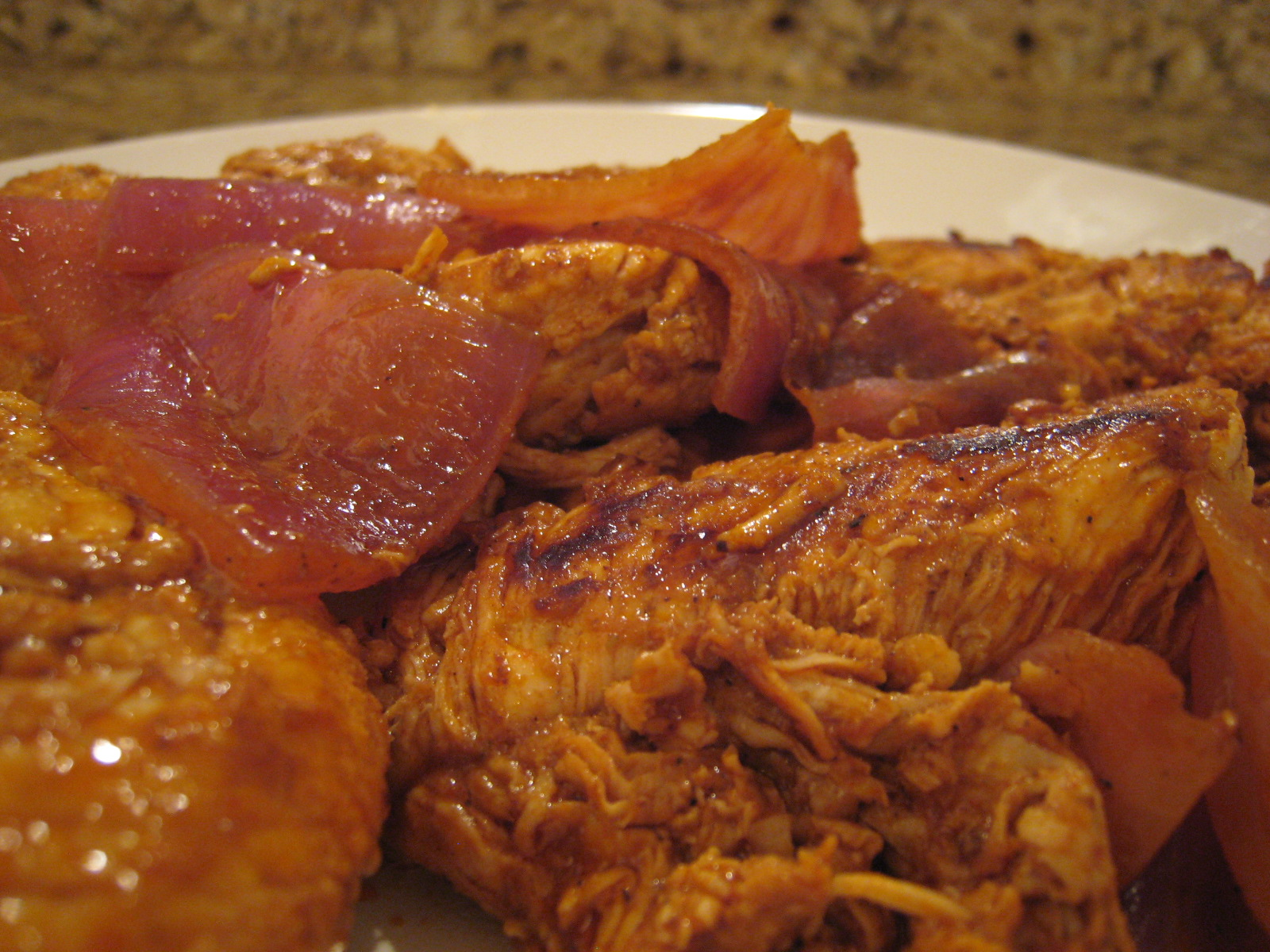
Peruvian-style chicken adobada

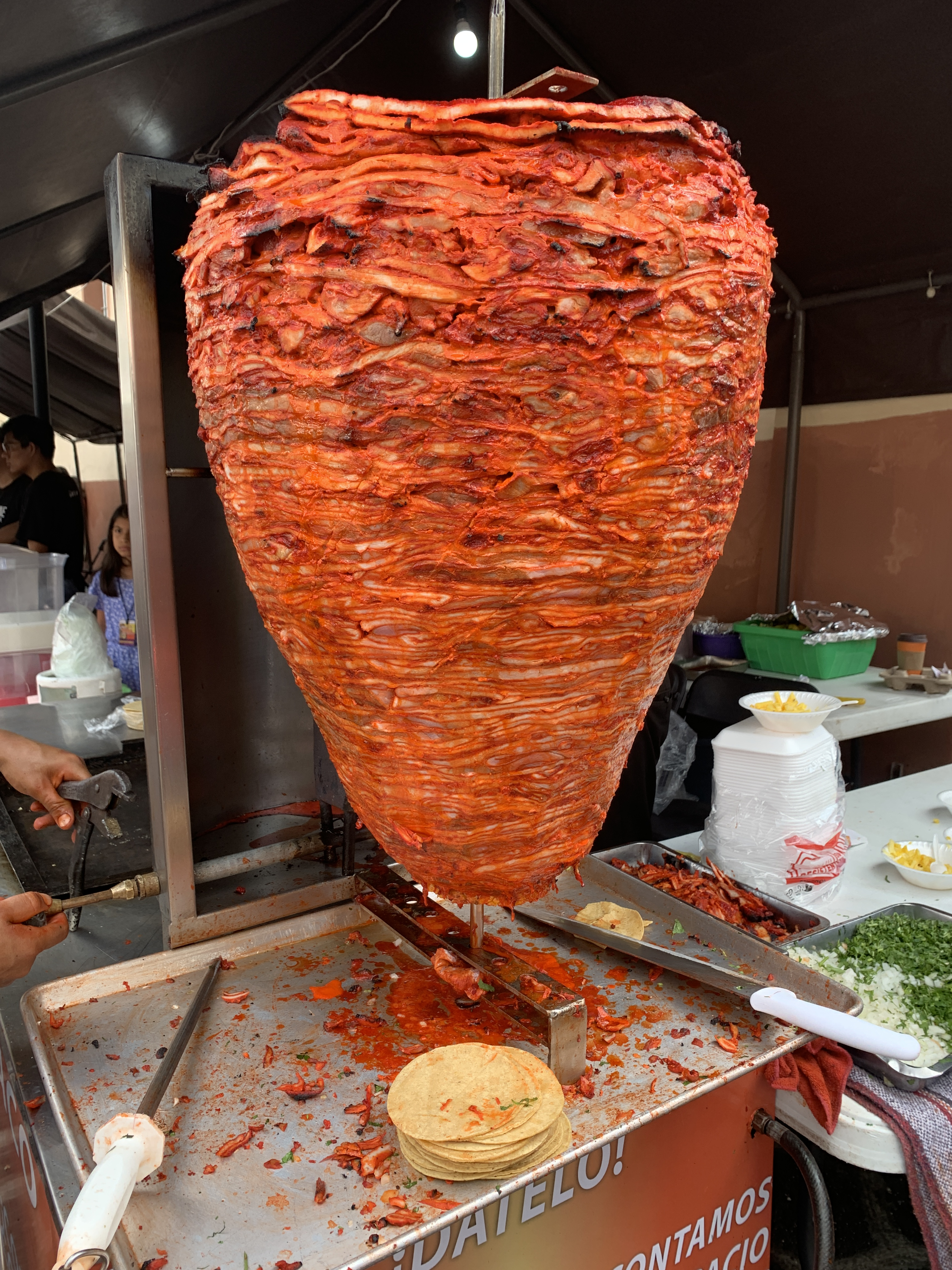
A trompo of adobada meat to be served as tacos al pastor
