= Ristra =

Hanging array of chiles or vegetables for drying

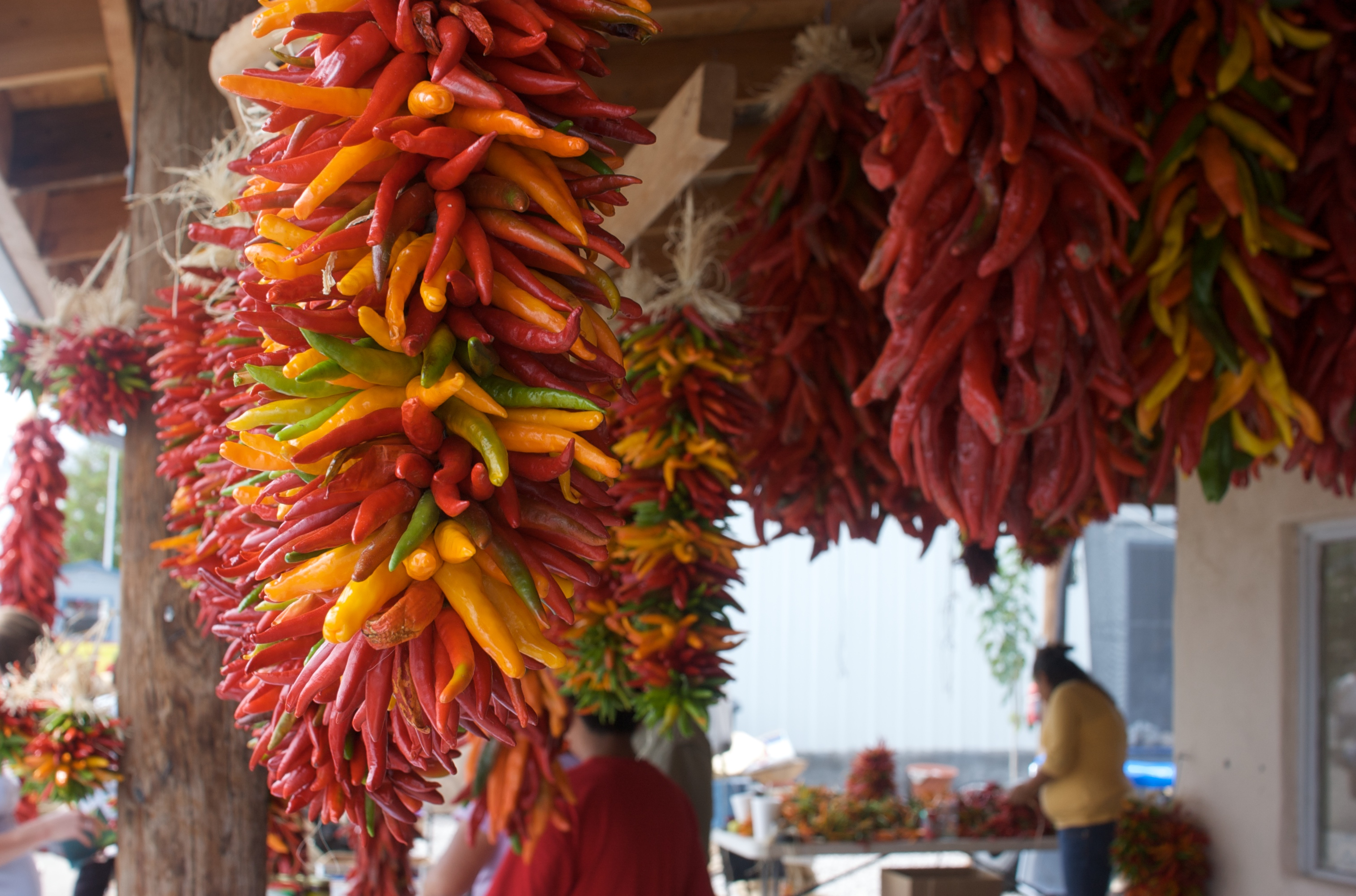
Chile ristras hanging to dry

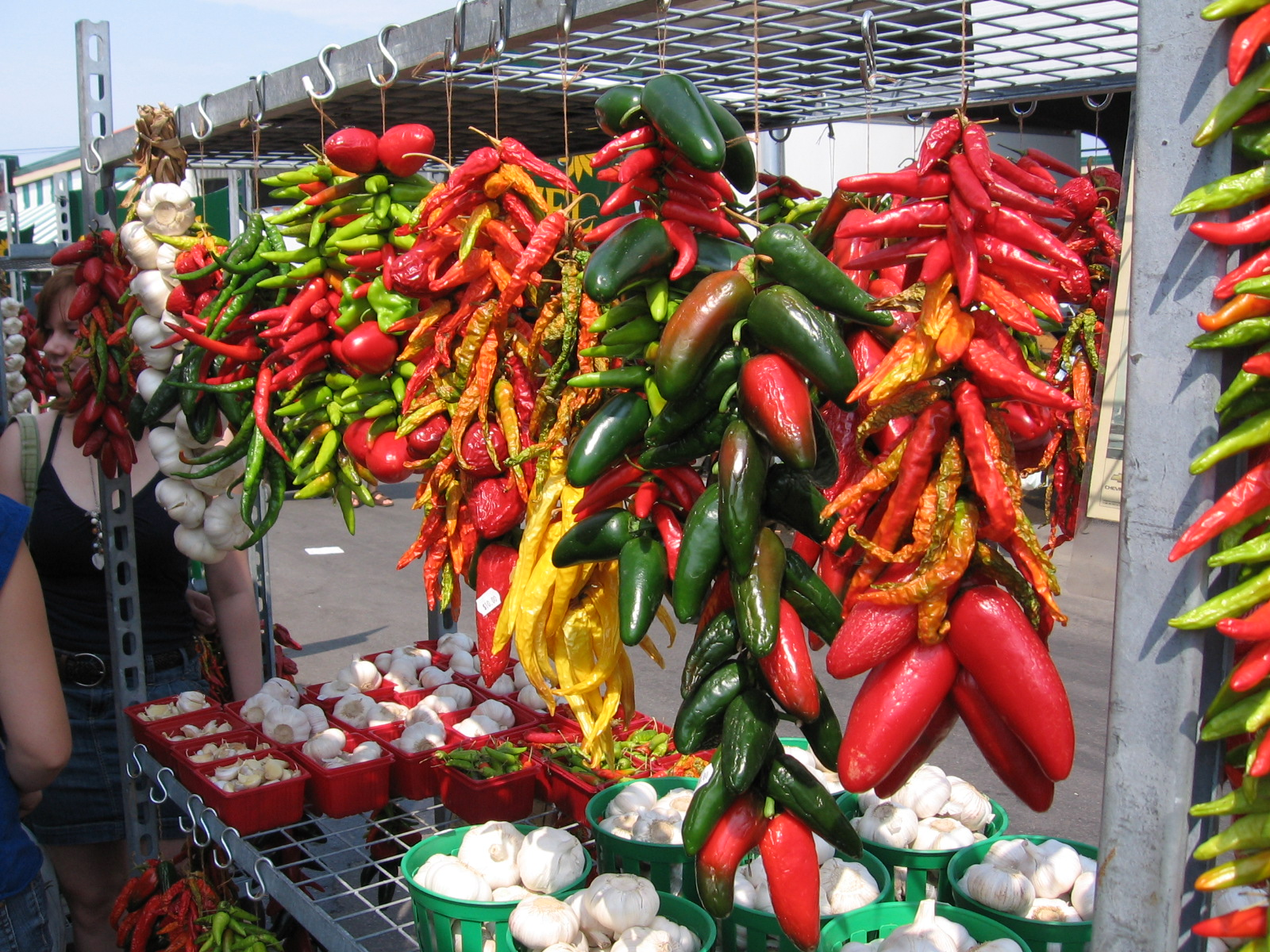
Ristras of jalapeños, other chili peppers, and garlic at a market in Montreal

A ristra (/ˈriːstrɑː/), also known as a sarta, is an arrangement of drying chile pepper pods, garlic bulbs, or other vegetables for later consumption. In addition to its practical use, the ristra has come to be a trademark of decorative design in the state of New Mexico as well as southern Arizona. Typically, large chiles such as New Mexico chiles and Anaheim peppers are used, although any kind of chile may be used. Chile de arbol, also known as chile pequin in New Mexico, is another common chile variety used in ristra making, particularly when making shapes such as wreaths, hearts, and crosses.

Garlic can also be arranged into a ristra for drying and curing after the bulbs have matured and the leaves have died away.

Ristras are commonly used for decoration and "are said to bring health and good luck."

== See also ==
- List of dried foods
- Sausage links
