= New Mexico No. 9 =

Variety of Chile pepper

- Species: Capsicum annuum
- Hybrid parentage: Pasilla, Colorado, Negro
- Cultivar group: New Mexico chile
- Marketing names: NuMex No.9
- Breeder: Fabián Garcia
- Origin: New Mexico, US
- Heat: Low
- Scoville scale: 1,000–1,500 SHU

New Mexico No. 9, also known as NuMex No. 9, Number 9 pepper or simply No. 9, was the first of the New Mexican chile pod types of chile peppers. It is an heirloom chile, grown today only in special quantities in New Mexico, United States. It was also the first New Mexico chile cultivar to be bred for commercial growth. It was released to growers in 1913 by Mexican-American horticulturist Fabián García, who began selecting local breeds in 1894 for improvement. The No. 9 helped to cement chile as a staple food in New Mexican cuisine.

== History ==
Chile peppers have been a staple of cuisine in the southwest United States and Mexico for centuries. In 1888, the New Mexico College of Agriculture and Mechanic Arts (NMA&MA, now known as New Mexico State University) began a chile improvement program to improve crop yields and disease resistance in chile plants for the farmers of the region. Horticulturist Fabián García began selecting breeds from around southern New Mexico and northern Mexico in 1894, improving the local chiles grown by the Hispanic gardeners around Las Cruces. Historically, chiles varied widely in their yield and piquancy, and farmers had little control or prediction of these genetic variables. He selected 14 chile accessions growing in the region around Las Cruces of pasilla (dark brown), colorado (red or "colorful"), and negro (black) pod types, with the purpose of creating a milder chile for consumption by Anglo settlers, and also to produce a chile that was "larger, smoother, fleshier, more tapering and included a shoulder-less pod for canning purposes."

After eliminating other candidate cultivars, 'No. 9' had "proven to be the best". According to García:

"While 'New Mexico No. 9' is not quite as hot as most of the unimproved varieties, it seems to be hot enough. Most of the plants produce pods having the characteristics desired, but there are always some plants in the field which tend to revert back; consequently, it is very necessary to select the seed in the field."

and

"No special effort [has been] made to produce a blight [chile wilt] resistant strain at this time. Naturally in the work of roguing and selection, incidentally the hardier and more blight resistant plants were also selected. While this variety, at the present time, is not entirely immune to the blight, it does show that it is not so susceptible to the wilt as the unimproved varieties. It is hoped that in the near future more intensive work can be undertaken to produce and establish an absolutely blight resistant variety."

— Dr. Fabián García, 1921,

Dr. García released 'No. 9' seeds to farmers in 1913, standard pod size and a uniform heat level. It became the standard chile in New Mexican cuisine until 1950, and also helped to establish the Mexican food industry in the United States. It is the cultivar from which all modern New Mexico chile pod type cultivars descend.
