= List of aquaria in the United States =

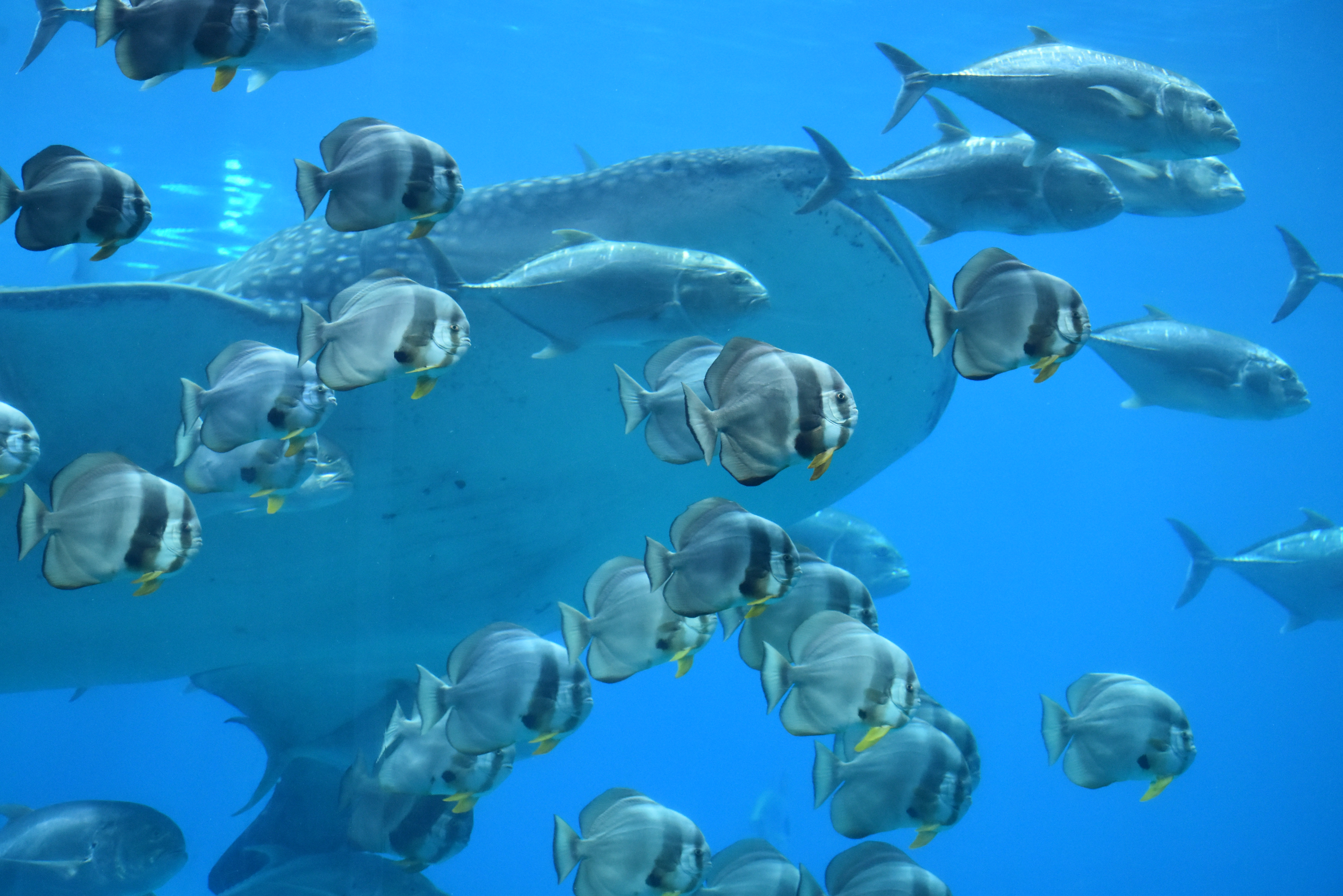
With over 11 million gallons, the largest aquarium in the United States is the Georgia Aquarium.

This is a list of existing public aquariums in the United States, some of which are unaccredited. For zoos, see List of zoos in the United States.

Aquariums are facilities where animals are confined within tanks and displayed to the public, and in which they may also be bred. Such facilities include public aquariums, oceanariums, marine mammal parks, and dolphinariums.

Many of the facilities in this list operate as a stand-alone facility, but some places might also be connected in a large part to an academic research center, garden, or zoo.

== Alabama ==
- Alabama Aquarium at Dauphin Island Sea Lab - Dauphin Island
- Cook Museum of Natural Science - Decatur

== Alaska ==
- Alaska SeaLife Center - Seward
- Sitka Sound Science Center - Sitka

== Arizona ==
- Wildlife World Zoo, Aquarium, and Safari Park - Litchfield Park
- OdySea Aquarium - Scottsdale
- Sea Life Arizona - Tempe
- Arizona-Sonora Desert Museum - Tucson

== Arkansas ==
- Blue Zoo Aquarium - Rogers

== California ==
- Aquarium of the Bay - San Francisco
- Aquarium of the Pacific - Long Beach
- Birch Aquarium - La Jolla
- Cabrillo Marine Aquarium - Los Angeles
- California Science Center - Los Angeles
- Central Coast Aquarium - Avila Beach
- Dennis Kelly Aquarium at Orange Coast College - Costa Mesa
- Heal the Bay Aquarium - Santa Monica
- Monterey Bay Aquarium - Monterey
- NorCal Aquarium and Wildlife Adventure - Folsom (formerly SeaQuest Folsom)
- Ocean Institute - Dana Point
- Ocean World - Crescent City
- Roundhouse Aquarium - Manhattan Beach
- Santa Barbara Museum of Natural History Sea Center - Santa Barbara
- Sea Life Aquarium at Legoland California - Carlsbad
- SeaWorld San Diego - San Diego
- Seymour Marine Discovery Center - Santa Cruz
- Steinhart Aquarium (California Academy of Sciences) - San Francisco

== Colorado ==
- Downtown Aquarium - Denver

== Connecticut ==
- Maritime Aquarium at Norwalk - Norwalk
- Mystic Aquarium - Mystic

== Florida ==
- Clearwater Marine Aquarium - Clearwater
- Dolphin Research Center - Grassy Key
- Florida Keys Aquarium Encounters - Marathon
- Gulf Specimen Marine Laboratory - Panacea
- Gulfarium Marine Adventure Park - Fort Walton Beach
- Gulf World Marine Park - Panama City Beach (closed 2025)
- Key West Aquarium - Key West
- Marineland of Florida - Marineland
- Miami Seaquarium - Miami (current iteration closed 2025; new version may open in the future)
- Mote Science Education Aquarium - Sarasota
- Orlando Science Center - Orlando
- Phillip and Patricia Frost Museum of Science - Miami
- Sea Life Orlando Aquarium - Orlando
- SeaWorld Orlando - Orlando
- South Florida Science Center and Aquarium - West Palm Beach
- St. Augustine Aquarium - St. Augustine
- Tampa Bay Watch Discovery Center (formerly the Pier Aquarium) - St. Petersburg
- The Florida Aquarium - Tampa
- The Seas with Nemo & Friends - Bay Lake
- The Turtle Hospital - Marathon
- Tarpon Springs Aquarium - Tarpon Springs

== Georgia ==
- Flint RiverQuarium - Albany
- Georgia Aquarium - Atlanta

== Hawaii ==
- Sea Life Park Hawaii - Honolulu
- Waikiki Aquarium - Honolulu
- Maui Ocean Center - Maui

== Idaho ==
- Aquarium of Boise - Boise
- East Idaho Aquarium - Idaho Falls

== Indiana ==
- Indianapolis Zoo & Aquarium - Indianapolis

== Illinois ==
- Shedd Aquarium - Chicago

== Iowa ==
- Blue Zoo Aquarium - Des Moines
- National Mississippi River Museum & Aquarium - Dubuque

== Kentucky ==
- Newport Aquarium - Newport

== Louisiana ==
- Blue Zoo Aquarium - Baton Rouge
- Natchitoches National Fish Hatchery and Aquarium - Natchitoches
- Audubon Aquarium - New Orleans
- Shreveport Aquarium - Shreveport

== Maine ==
- Mount Desert Oceanarium - Bar Harbor
- Maine State Aquarium - Boothbay Harbor
- Gulf of Maine Research Institute - Portland
- Maine Aquarium - Saco (closed; plans for re-opening dependent on fundraising)

== Maryland ==
- National Aquarium - Baltimore
- Glen Echo Park Aquarium - Glen Echo
- Ocean City Life-Saving Station Museum - Ocean City
- Calvert Marine Museum - Solomons

== Massachusetts ==
- The Feigenbaum Aquarium at Berkshire Museum - Pittsfield
- Cape Cod Museum of Natural History - Brewster
- Maria Mitchell Aquarium - Nantucket
- New England Aquarium - Boston
- Woods Hole Science Aquarium - Woods Hole

== Michigan ==
- Michigan Sea Life Aquarium - Auburn Hills
- Belle Isle Aquarium - Detroit
- John Ball Zoological Garden - Grand Rapids

== Minnesota ==
- Great Lakes Aquarium - Duluth
- Sea Life Minnesota Aquarium - Bloomington
- Discovery Bay at Minnesota Zoo - Apple Valley
- SeaQuest Minnesota - Roseville (closed)

== Mississippi ==
- Institute for Marine Mammal Studies - Gulfport
- Mississippi Aquarium - Gulfport
- Ocean Adventures Marine Park - Gulfport
- Mississippi Museum of Natural Science - Jackson

== Missouri ==
- Aquarium At The Boardwalk - Branson
- Kansas City Zoo & Aquarium - Kansas City, Missouri
- Sea Life Kansas City - Kansas City
- St Louis Aquarium at Union Station - St. Louis
- World Aquarium - St. Louis (closed 2019)
- Wonders of Wildlife Museum & Aquarium - Springfield

== Nebraska ==
- Schramm Education Center - Schramm Park State Recreation Area, Omaha
- Omaha's Henry Doorly Zoo and Aquarium - Omaha

== Nevada ==
- One World Interactive Aquarium - Las Vegas (formerly SeaQuest Las Vegas)
- Shark Reef Aquarium - Las Vegas
- The Aquarium at the Silverton Hotel - Las Vegas

== New Hampshire ==
- Explore the Ocean World Oceanarium - Hampton
- Seacoast Science Center - Rye

== New Jersey ==
- Adventure Aquarium - Camden
- Atlantic City Aquarium - Atlantic City
- Jenkinson's Aquarium - Point Pleasant Beach
- Marine Mammal Stranding Center - Brigantine
- Sea Life New Jersey Aquarium - East Rutherford
- Seaport Aquarium - Wildwood
- Woodbridge Aquarium and Wildlife Center - Woodbridge (formerly SeaQuest Woodbridge)

== New Mexico ==
- ABQ BioPark Aquarium - Albuquerque

== New York ==
- Aquarium of Niagara - Niagara Falls
- Cold Spring Harbor Fish Hatchery & Aquarium - Cold Spring Harbor
- Harborview Aquarium - Syracuse
- Long Island Aquarium - Riverhead
- New York Aquarium - Brooklyn
- VIA Aquarium - Schenectady

== North Carolina ==
- Aquarium & Shark Lab by Team ECCO - Hendersonville
- Catawba Science Center - Hickory
- Discovery Place - Charlotte
- North Carolina at Fort Fisher - Kure Beach
- North Carolina at Pine Knoll Shores - Pine Knoll Shores
- North Carolina Aquarium on Roanoke Island - Roanoke Island
- SciQuarium - Greensboro
- Sea Life Charlotte-Concord Aquarium - Concord

== Ohio ==
- Columbus Zoo and Aquarium - Columbus
- Greater Cleveland Aquarium - Cleveland
- Toledo Zoo and Aquarium - Toledo

== Oklahoma ==
- Oklahoma Aquarium - Jenks
- Medicine Park Aquarium - Medicine Park
- Blue Zoo Aquarium - Oklahoma City

== Oregon ==
- Charleston Marine Life Center - Coos Bay
- Hatfield Marine Science Center - Newport
- Oregon Coast Aquarium - Newport
- Seaside Aquarium - Seaside

== Pennsylvania ==
- Electric City Aquarium & Reptile Den - Scranton
- Pittsburgh Zoo & Aquarium - Pittsburgh

== Rhode Island ==
- Biomes Marine Biology Center - North Kingstown
- Save the Bay The Exploration Center and Aquarium - Newport

== South Carolina ==
- Ripley's Aquarium of Myrtle Beach - Myrtle Beach
- South Carolina Aquarium - Charleston

== South Dakota ==
- Butterfly House & Aquarium - Sioux Falls
- Gavins Point National Fish Hatchery - Yankton
- The Outdoor Campus - Rapid City

== Tennessee ==
- Aquarium inside Memphis Zoo - Memphis
- Aquarium Restaurant - Nashville
- Ripley's Aquarium of the Smokies - Gatlinburg
- Tennessee Aquarium - Chattanooga

== Texas ==
- Austin Aquarium - Austin
- Aquarium Restaurant - Kemah
- Children's Aquarium at Fair Park - Dallas
- Sea life Grapevine-
- Dallas World Aquarium - Dallas
- Downtown Aquarium - Houston
- Moody Gardens Aquarium - Galveston
- Richard Friedrich Aquarium - San Antonio
- San Antonio Aquarium - Leon Valley
- Sea Center Texas - Lake Jackson
- Sea Life San Antonio Aquarium - San Antonio
- SeaWorld San Antonio - San Antonio
- Texas Freshwater Fisheries Center - Athens
- Texas State Aquarium - Corpus Christi

== Utah ==
- Loveland Living Planet Aquarium - Draper
- Layton Aquarium and Wildlife Encounters - Layton (formerly SeaQuest Utah)

== Vermont ==
- ECHO, Leahy Center for Lake Champlain - Burlington
- Montshire Museum of Science - Norwich

== Virginia ==
- Virginia Aquarium & Marine Science Center - Virginia Beach
- Virginia Living Museum - Newport News

== Washington ==
- MaST Center Aquarium - Des Moines
- Marine Life Center - Bellingham
- Point Defiance Zoo & Aquarium - Tacoma
- Port Townsend Marine Science Center - Port Townsend
- Feiro Marine Life Center - Port Angeles
- Puget Sound Estuarium - Olympia
- SEA Discovery Center - Poulsbo
- Seattle Aquarium - Seattle
- Blue Zoo Aquarium - Spokane
- Westport Aquarium - Westport

== Wisconsin ==
- Discovery World - Milwaukee

== See also ==
- List of aquaria
- List of AZA member zoos and aquariums
- List of CAZA member zoos and aquariums
- List of dolphinariums
- List of nature centers in the United States
- List of zoos in the United States
