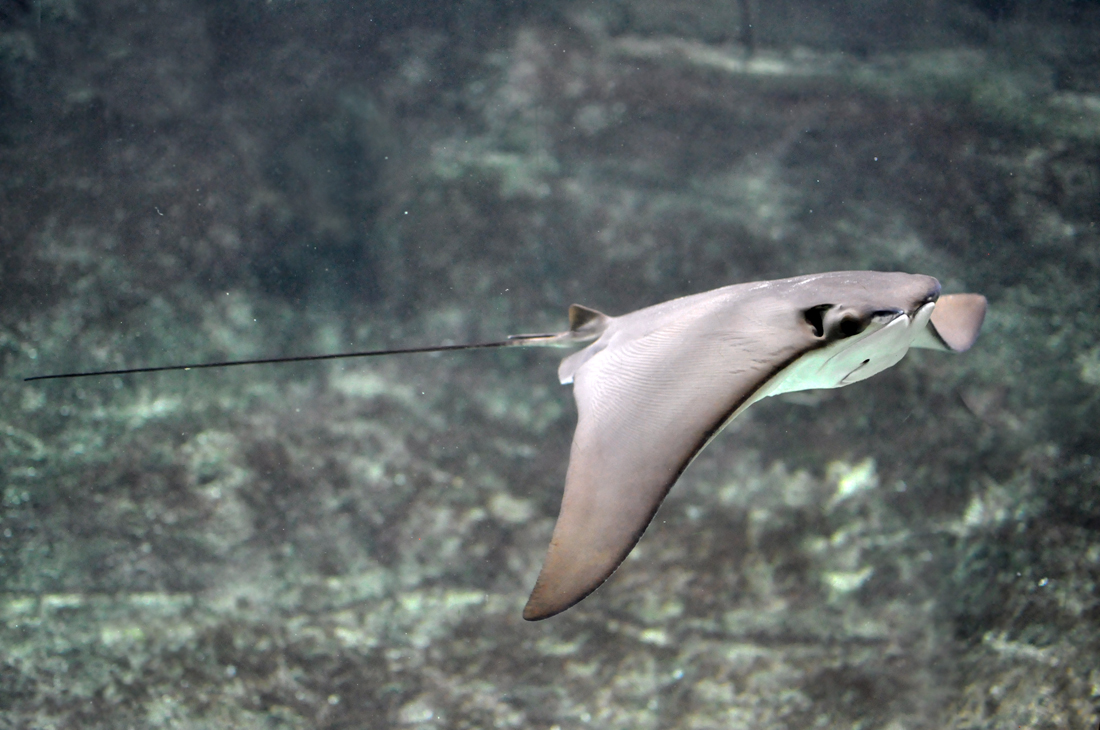

Conservation status
- Vulnerable (IUCN 3.1)

Scientific classification
- Kingdom: Animalia
- Phylum: Chordata
- Class: Chondrichthyes
- Subclass: Elasmobranchii
- Order: Myliobatiformes
- Family: Rhinopteridae
- Genus: Rhinoptera
- Species: R. bonasus

Binomial name
- Rhinoptera bonasus (Mitchill, 1815)

= Cownose ray =

Species of cartilaginous fish

The cownose ray (Rhinoptera bonasus) is a species found throughout a large part of the western Atlantic and Caribbean, from New England to southern Brazil (the East Atlantic ones are now generally considered a separate species, the Lusitanian cownose ray (R. marginata)). These rays also belong to the order Myliobatiformes, a group that is shared by bat rays, manta rays, and eagle rays.

Cownose rays prefer to live in shallower, coastal waters or estuaries. Size, lifespan, and maturity differ between male and female rays. Rays have a distinct shape, with two lobes at the front of their head, resembling a cow nose. Cownose rays can live between 16 and 21 years, depending on sex. Rays feed upon organisms with harder shells, such as clams, crustaceans, or mollusks. They are migratory creatures, south in the winter and north in the summer. The rays are known to occupy the Chesapeake Bay in the summer.

In 2019, the species was listed as vulnerable on the IUCN Red List. The species has been subjected to overfishing due to the perceived threat of overpopulation in the Chesapeake Bay. Few conservation strategies or efforts have been undertaken for cownose rays.

== Taxonomy ==
The generic name Rhinoptera comes from the Ancient Greek words for nose (rhinos) and wing (pteron). The specific name bonasus comes from the Ancient Greek for bison (bonasos).

== Description ==
A cownose ray typically has a brown back with a slightly white or yellow belly. Although its coloration is not particularly distinctive, its shape is easily recognizable. It has a broad head with wide-set eyes, and a pair of distinctive lobes on its subrostral fin. It also has a set of dental plates designed for crushing clam and oyster shells. Male rays often reach about 2.5 feet (0.76 m) in width, while females typically reach about 3.0 ft (0.9 m) in width. The cownose ray is sometimes mistaken for a shark by beach-goers due to the tips of the rays' fins sticking out of the water, often resembling the dorsal fin of a shark.

When threatened, the cownose ray can use the barb at the base of its tail to defend itself from the threat. A cownose ray has a spine with a toxin, close to the ray's body. This spine has teeth lining its lateral edges, and is coated with a weak venom that causes symptoms similar to those of a bee sting.

== Habitat and distribution ==
Cownose rays are migratory and social creatures and reside on the East Coast of the United States, Brazil, and the Gulf of Mexico. They prefer to live in near coastal waters and in estuarian ecosystems and are able to tolerate a wide range of salinities. The rays to have the potential to change habitats if one area gets too crowded and competition for resources is high. Cownose rays are known to be abundant in the Chesapeake Bay and migrate to the area for mating and nursery purposes, typically in the late spring and summer, typically spotted near the surface of waters.

== Behavior ==
=== Diet and feeding ===
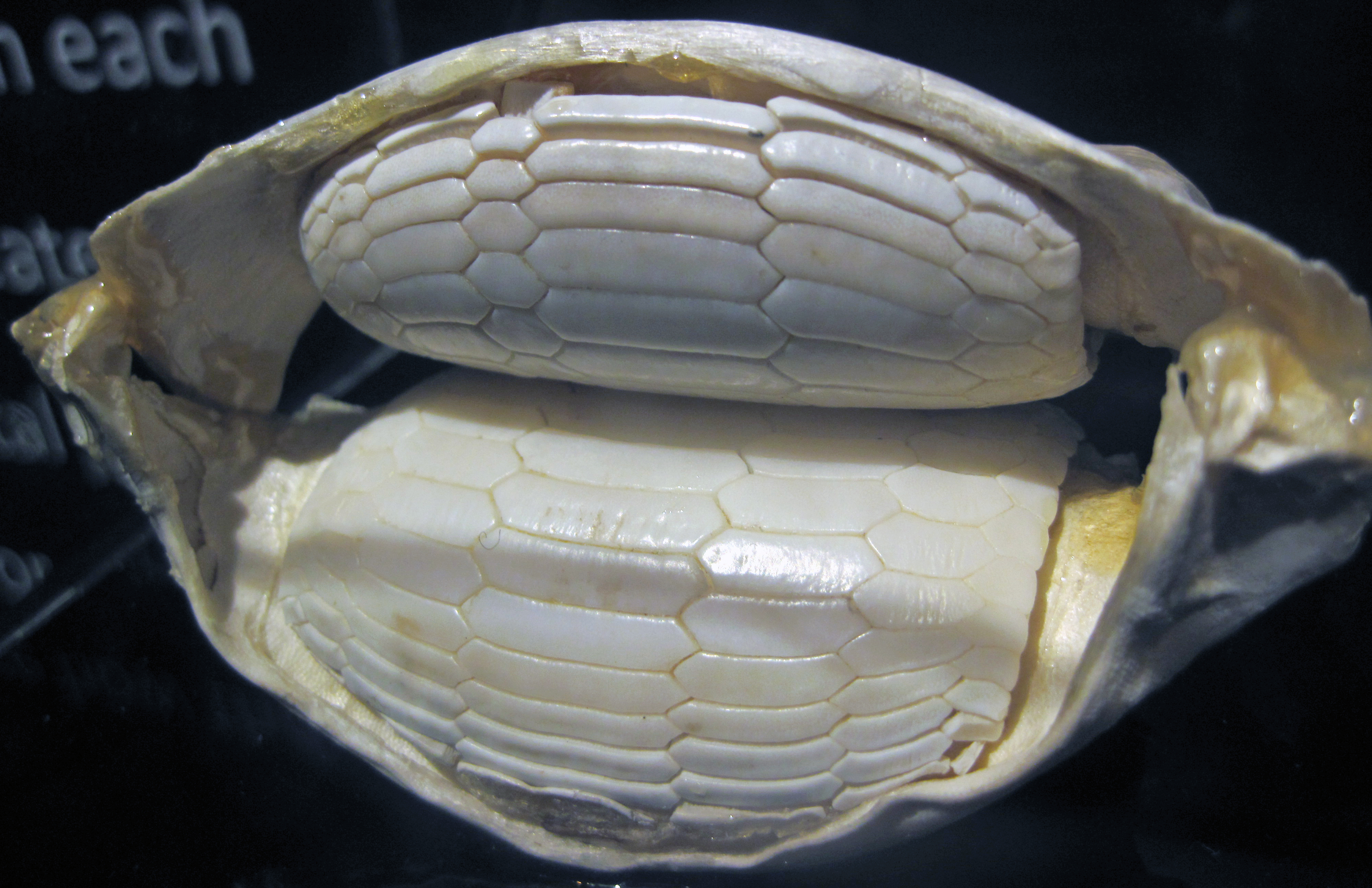
Cownose ray teeth and mouthparts: Stingray teeth consist of interlocking bars (dental plates) that crush food.

The cownose ray exhibits a durophagous diet, meaning it feeds upon hard-shelled organisms, such as mollusks and crustaceans; they prefer scallops or clams, which have softer shells and are bivalves. This ray tends to feed either in the early morning or in the late afternoon, when the waves are calm and visibility is higher than during the day. Feeding occurs in the benthic zone or at the bottom of the ocean.

The rays are able to capture their prey through suction by opening and closing their jaws. Because of the type of prey cownose rays consume, their jaws need to be able to handle the hard-shelled organisms. Their jaws are extremely robust and have teeth with a hardness comparable to that of concrete. Their cephalic lobes also assist with capturing and handling their prey by pushing it towards their mouths.

=== Predation ===
The cownose ray, being high on the food chain, has few natural predators, including cobia, hammerhead sharks, and humans who fish for them.

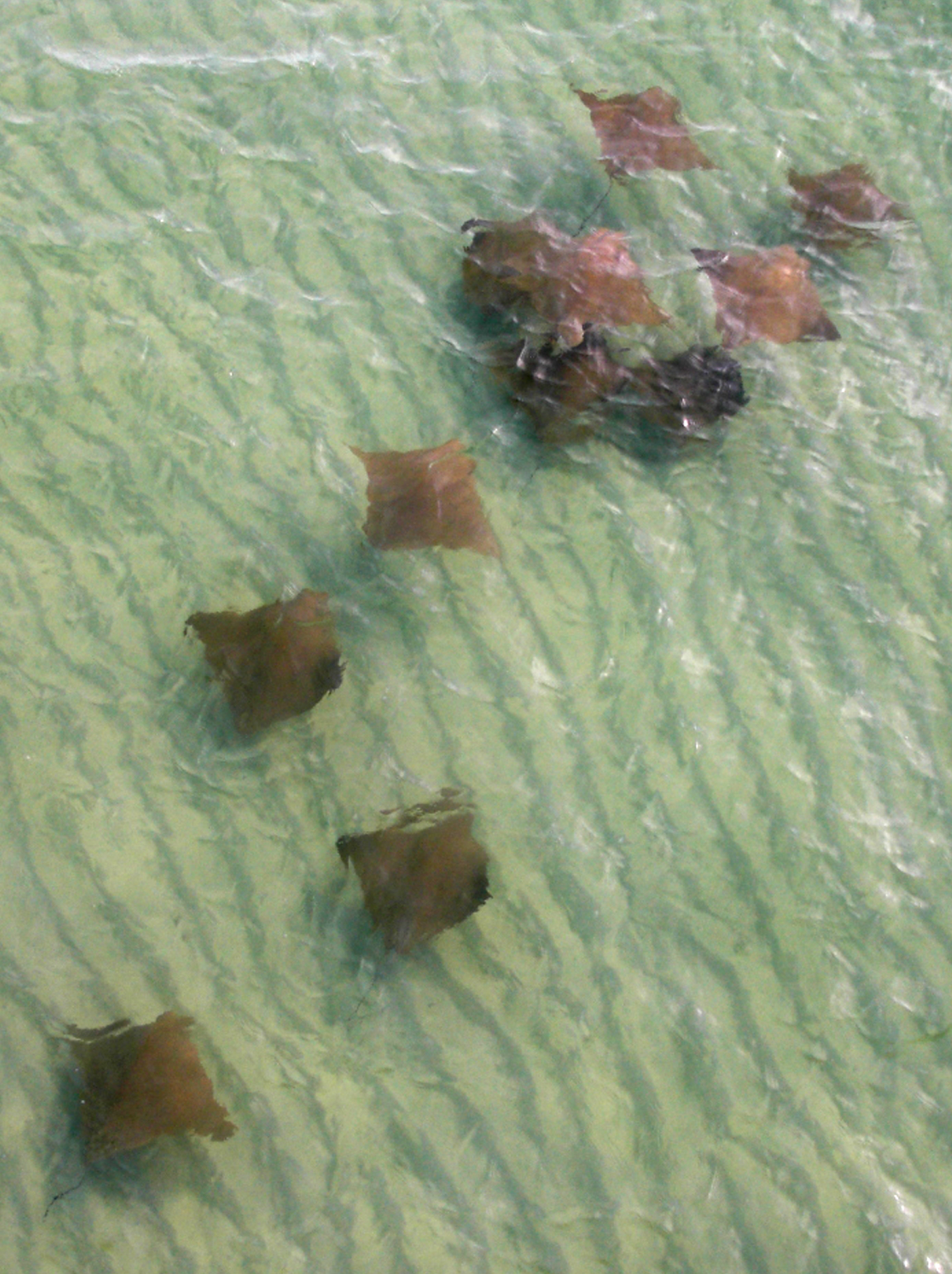
Cownose rays swimming in shallows in the Gulf of Mexico

=== Reproduction and lifespan ===
Cownose rays breed from April through October. They do not reach maturity until they are roughly 70% of their maximum size. Females reach maturity between ages 7 and 8, while males reach maturity around ages 6–7. The lifespan of the cownose ray varies by sex; the oldest female ray that has been recorded was 21, and the oldest male ray was 18, both observed in the Chesapeake Bay.

Cownose rays are ovoviviparous, meaning that the embryo grows within its mother until it is ready to hatch. Rays have a longer gestation period due to their K-selected species attributes. The length of gestation is believed to last between 11 and 12 months, and at full term, the offspring are born live, exiting tail first.

=== Migration ===
Rays often travel and migrate in large schools based on size and sex. Their migration pattern moves north in late spring and south in late Fall. Much of what is known about their migration has been from studies done in the Chesapeake Bay. Male and female rays enter the bay in the late spring and leave in the fall. While there, the female rays and their pups live in the estuarine waters. Males have been observed leaving the bay earlier than the females to arrive at a second feeding ground, but the reason for taking a longer migration route is not fully known. One hypothesis is that males exit the bay to reduce competition of certain resources, such as food and shelter.

== Threats and conservation ==
The cownose ray is currently listed as vulnerable by the IUCN Red List due to extensive overfishing and commercial fishing. The overfishing is due to the perception that rays destroy oyster beds meant for the shellfish industry.

The trophic cascade in the northwest Atlantic Ocean has been cited and used to link cownose ray overpopulation to the decrease in large coastal sharks, which then causes bivalve populations valuable for commercial reasons to be depleted, but little evidence supports this hypothesis. Campaigns such as "Save the Bay, Eat a Ray" in the Chesapeake Bay used these claims to promote the fishery of these rays in hopes of preserving the bay, which can be detrimental to this species. Cownose rays reach a mature age later in their lifecycle and have long gestation periods, meaning that they are a K-selected species. This suggests that they are vulnerable and sensitive to overfishing, and their populations cannot easily bounce back after these events. Though rays have been used as a scapegoat to explain the decline in bivalves, some studies have found that cownose rays do not consume a great deal of oysters or clams. Other studies have found that much of the shellfish prey that the cownose ray consumes is influenced by the size of the shell, so oyster growers as suggested to protect their shellfish until their shells reach a certain size.

Few conservation strategies or efforts have been taken for cownose rays, except cownose ray-killing contests have been banned in Maryland.

== Relationship to humans ==
=== Risk to humans ===
Stingrays, including the cownose ray, can pose a low to moderate risk to humans. Rays can lash their tails when threatened, posing a risk of being whipped. If threatened, cownose rays can also use their barbs as a weapon to sting the aggressor. A sting from a cownose ray can cause a very painful wound that requires medical attention. While the sting is not usually fatal, it can be if it strikes the abdomen. Also, a risk exists from eating meat from the sea animal that has not been prepared correctly. Shigella bacteria may be acquired from eating flesh from a contaminated cownose ray, which causes shigellosis and can result in dysentery. Symptoms can include diarrhea, pain, fever, and possible dehydration.

=== Aquariums ===
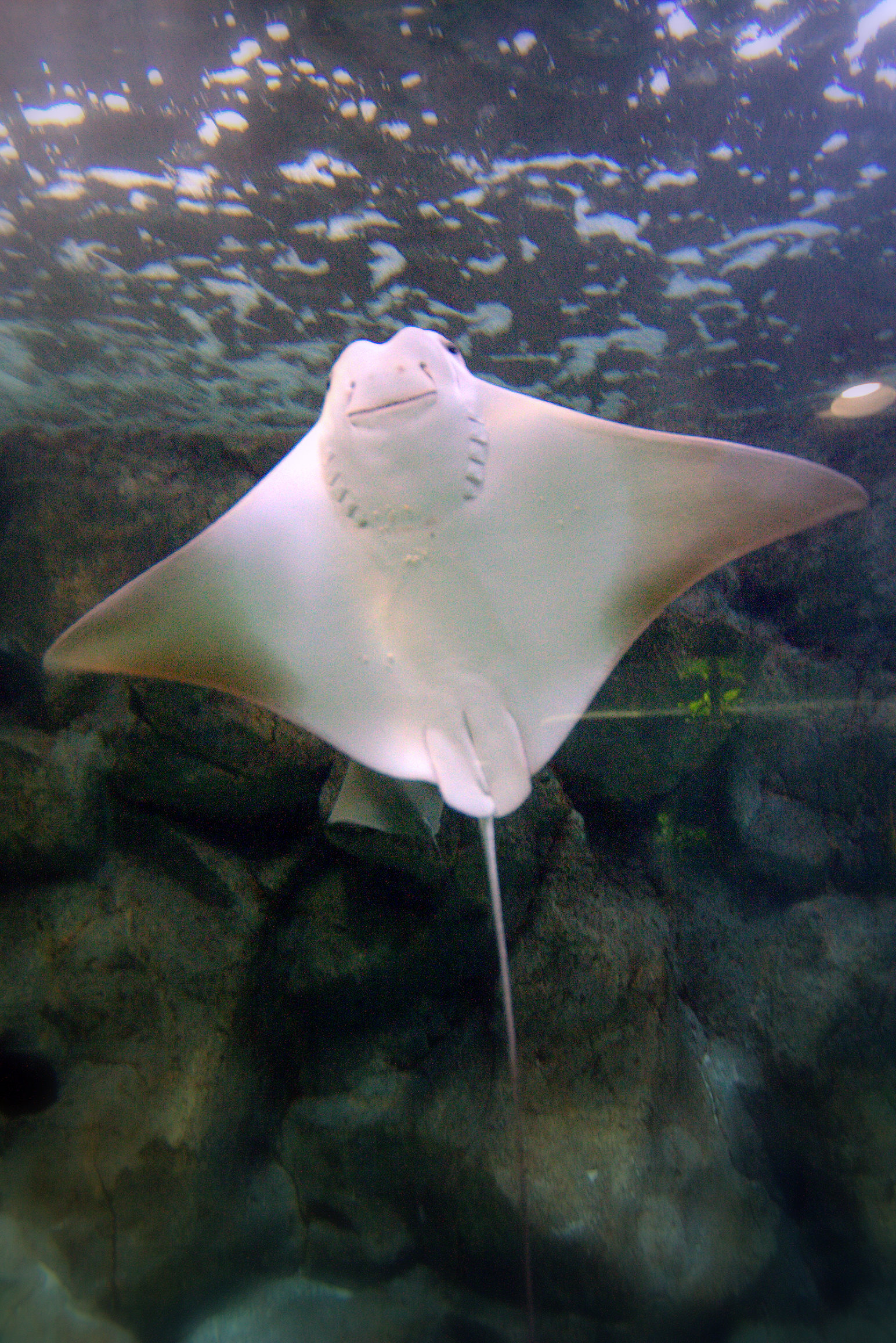
The underside of a cownose ray

Cownose rays can be seen in many public aquaria worldwide and are often featured in special "touch tanks" where visitors can reach into a wide but shallow pool containing the fish, which have often had their barbs pinched or taken off (they eventually regrow, similar to human nails), making them safe enough to touch.

These aquariums and zoos are known to have touch tanks featuring cownose rays (alone or with other fish):

==== US ====
- Adventure Aquarium in Camden, New Jersey
- Albuquerque Aquarium in Albuquerque, New Mexico
- Audubon Aquarium in New Orleans, Louisiana
- Aquarium of Boise in Boise, Idaho
- Arizona-Sonora Desert Museum in Tucson, Arizona
- Atlantic City Aquarium in Atlantic City, New Jersey
- Aquarium of the Pacific in Long Beach, California
- Butterfly House and Aquarium in Sioux Falls, South Dakota
- Brookfield Zoo in Chicago, Illinois
- California Academy of Sciences in San Francisco, California
- Calvert Marine Museum in Solomons, Maryland
- Children's Aquarium at Fair Park in Dallas, Texas
- Clearwater Marine Aquarium in Clearwater, Florida
- Columbus Zoo and Aquarium in Powell, Ohio
- Denver Zoo in Denver, Colorado
- Detroit Zoo in Royal Oak, Michigan
- Downtown Aquarium, Denver in Denver, Colorado
- Fort Wayne Children's Zoo in Fort Wayne, Indiana
- Fresno Chaffee Zoo in Fresno, California
- Georgia Aquarium in Atlanta, Georgia
- Greater Cleveland Aquarium in Cleveland, Ohio
- Greensboro Science Center in Greensboro, North Carolina
- Gulf World Marine Park in Panama City Beach, Florida
- Henry Doorly Zoo in Omaha, Nebraska
- IMAG History & Science Center in Fort Myers, Florida
- Indianapolis Zoo in Indianapolis, Indiana
- Jacksonville Zoo and Gardens in Jacksonville, Florida
- Jungle Reef in Colorado Springs, Colorado
- Kansas City Zoo in Kansas City, Missouri
- Living Shores Aquarium in Glen, New Hampshire
- Long Island Aquarium in Riverhead, New York
- Lowry Park Zoo in Tampa, Florida
- Marine Science Center in Ponce Inlet, Florida
- Maritime Aquarium in Norwalk, Connecticut
- Memphis Zoo and Aquarium in Memphis, Tennessee
- Mississippi Aquarium in Gulfport, Mississippi
- Mote Marine Laboratory in Sarasota, Florida
- Mystic Aquarium in Mystic, Connecticut
- National Mississippi River Museum & Aquarium in Dubuque, Iowa
- The New England Aquarium in Boston, Massachusetts
- New York Aquarium in Brooklyn, New York
- Newport Aquarium in Newport, Kentucky
- North Carolina Aquarium at Pine Knoll Shores in Emerald Isle, North Carolina
- Ocean Adventures in Gulfport, Mississippi
- OdySea Aquarium in Scottsdale, Arizona
- Oklahoma City Zoo and Botanical Garden in Oklahoma City, Oklahoma
- Phoenix Zoo in Phoenix, Arizona
- Rooster Cogburn Ostrich Ranch in Picacho, Arizona
- Ripley's Aquarium of Myrtle Beach in Myrtle Beach, South Carolina
- Ripley's Aquarium of the Smokies in Gatlinburg, Tennessee
- Saint Louis Zoo in St. Louis, Missouri
- San Antonio Aquarium in San Antonio, Texas
- SeaWorld Orlando in Orlando, Florida
- Sedgwick County Zoo in Wichita, Kansas
- Shedd Aquarium in Chicago, Illinois
- Shreveport Aquarium in Shreveport, Louisiana
- South Carolina Aquarium, in Charleston South Carolina
- Tarpon Springs Aquarium in Tarpon Springs, Florida
- Tennessee Aquarium in Chattanooga, Tennessee
- Texas State Aquarium in Corpus Christi, Texas
- The Florida Aquarium in Tampa, Florida
- Toledo Zoo in Toledo, Ohio
- Tropicana Field in St. Petersburg, Florida (The Rays Touch Tank)
- Turtle Back Zoo in West Orange, New Jersey
- Wonders of Wildlife Museum & Aquarium in Springfield, Missouri
- ViaAquarium in Rotterdam, New York
- Virginia Aquarium in Virginia Beach, Virginia

==== Canada ====
- Aquarium of Quebec in Quebec City
- Granby Zoo in Granby
- Ripley's Aquarium of Canada in Toronto, Ontario
- The Vancouver Aquarium in Vancouver, British Columbia
- Assiniboine Park Zoo in Winnipeg, Manitoba
