= Ridgmar Mall =

Shopping mall in Fort Worth, Texas, US

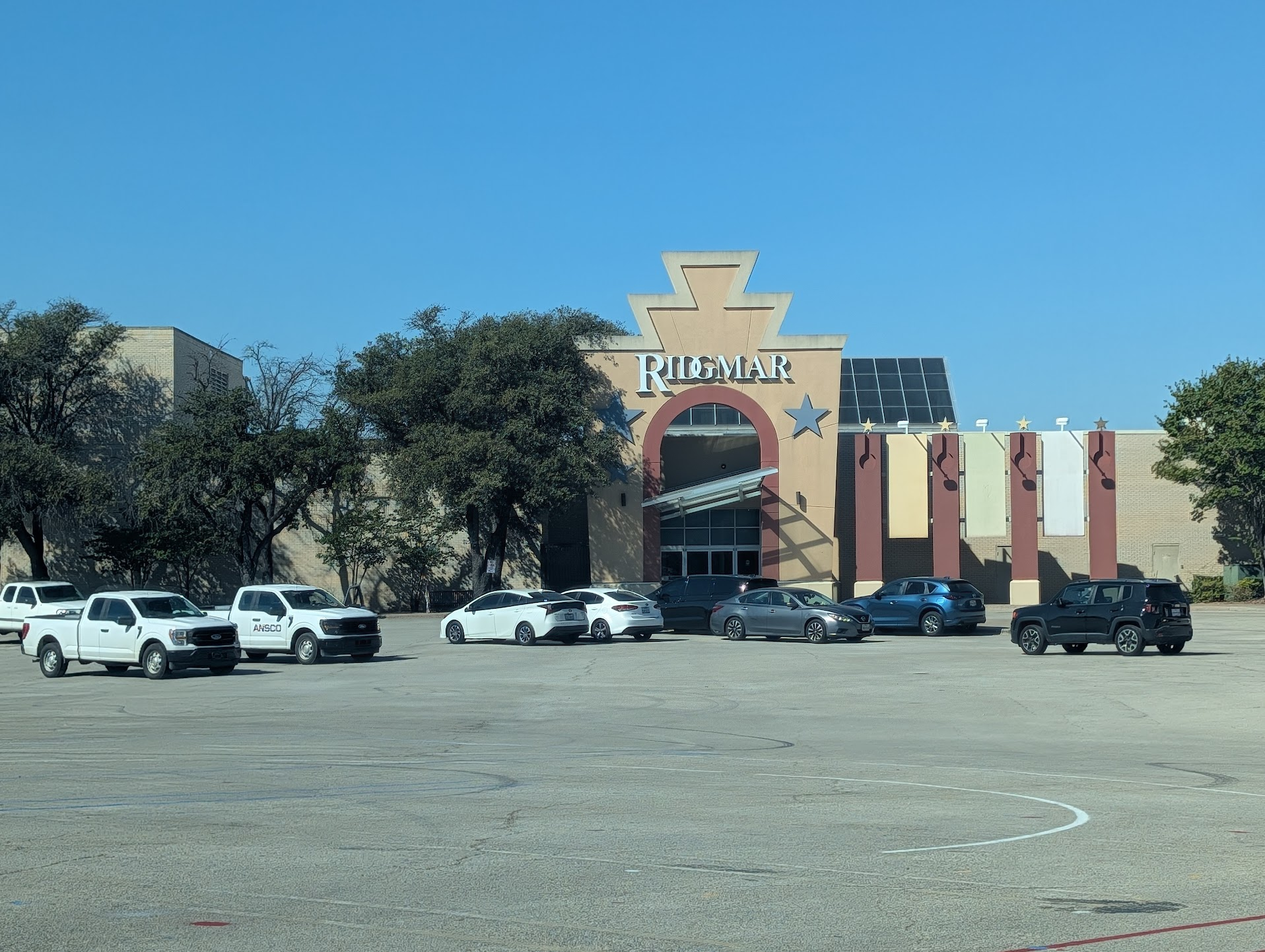
- Southeastern entrance (October 2025)
- Location: Fort Worth, Texas, United States
- Coordinates: 32.74135°N 97.43386°W
- Address: 1888 Green Oaks Road
- Opened: October 20, 1976
- Developer: The Kravco Co.
- Owner: Ramrock Real Estate
- Num. of stores: 15
- Num. of anchor tenants: 8 (4 open, 4 vacant)
- Floor area: 1,274,470 square feet (118,402 m^{2})
- Floors: 2
- Parking: Uncovered free parking

Ridgmar Mall is an enclosed shopping mall in Fort Worth, Texas. It opened in 1976 at 1888 Green Oaks Road and Interstate 30. It is owned by Ramrock Real Estate, Inc. It includes four anchor stores – Dillard's Clearance Center, JCPenney, Rave Cinemas and Free Up Storage – with two vacant anchors last occupied by Sears and Neiman Marcus.

== History ==
Ridgmar Mall opened in 1976 with Dillard's, JCPenney, and Neiman Marcus as the original anchor stores. In 1977, Sears was opened as an additional anchor store. Foley's was opened in 1998, later being converted into Macy's in 2006. Rave Cinemas was opened in the early 2000s as another anchor store.

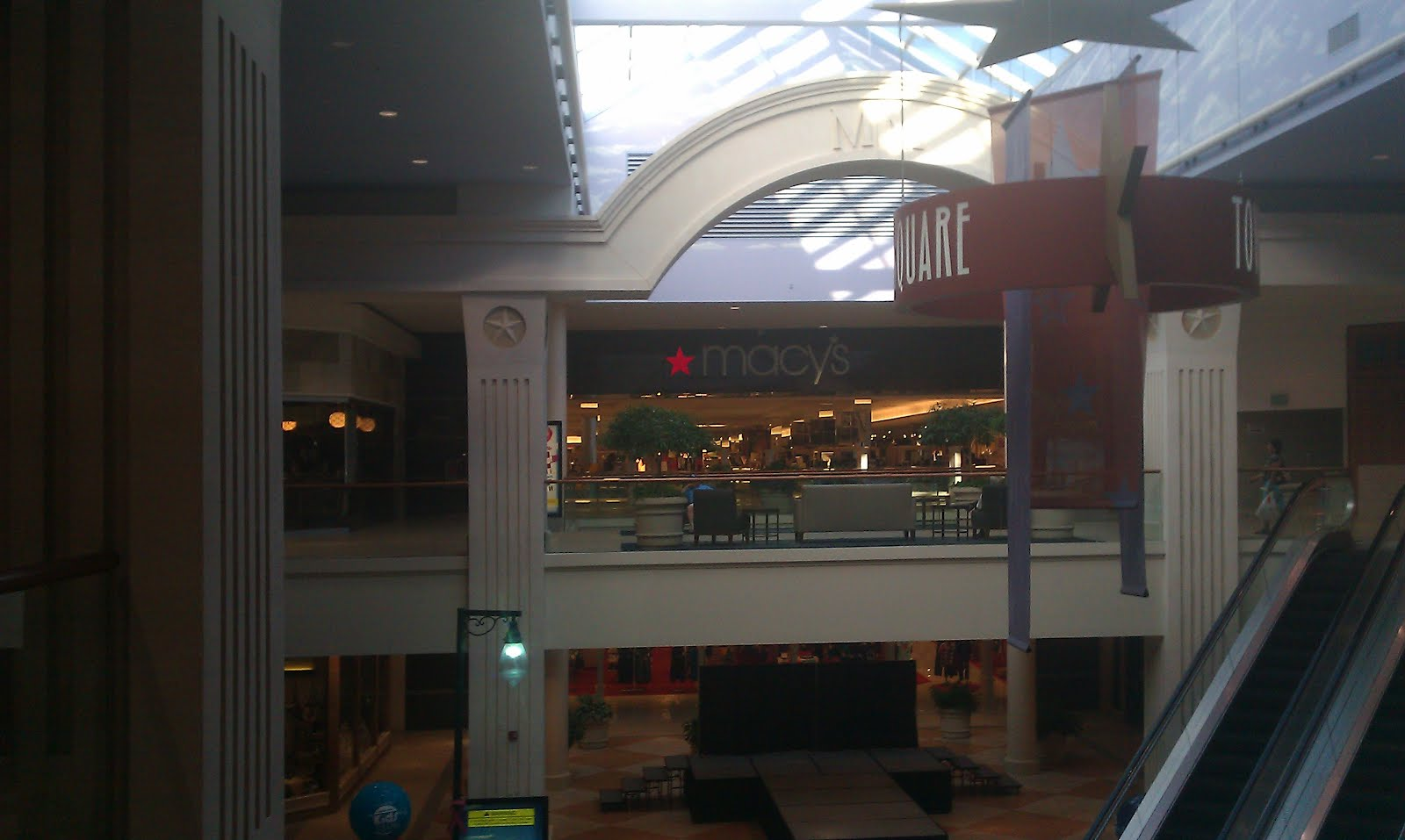
2012 image of the Macy's storefront.

- In 2013, Macerich Co. sold the mall to GK Real Estate (formerly GK Development).
- In 2014, Neiman Marcus announced intentions to relocate their Ridgmar Mall location to a new shopping mall development in three years' time.
- In 2015, Clothing & Retail company H&M opened its doors to the public after unveiling plans for a store in the mall earlier in the year. The location closed potentially circa 2021.
- In 2016, GK Real Estate announced a three-phase multimillion-dollar renovation of the property. Phase one including new paint, lighting, and new railing on the second floor. Rave Cinemas also conducted a $3 million remodel.
- In 2016, it was announced that Macy's would be closing their location in an effort to cut operating costs.
- In 2016, Dillard's was converted to a clearance center.
- In October 2016, GK Real Estate acquired the Neiman Marcus space as Neiman Marcus prepared to relocate in 2017.
- In 2017, a 28,000 square foot SeaQuest aquarium opened to visitors.
- In 2018, Sears announced that it would close its Ridgmar Mall location as part of a plan to close 72 stores nationwide.
- In 2020, JCPenney put 21 stores up for sale, including the Ridgmar Mall location.
- In 2020, the space formerly occupied by Macy's was acquired by Right Move Storage and was subsequently converted into a Self storage facility.
- In 2021, the space formerly occupied by H&M was taken by Tarrant County health officials and converted into a site for the administration of vaccines for COVID-19.
- In 2023, Right Move Storage closed their Ridgmar Mall location, the space being acquired by Free Up Storage which opened later in the year.
- On January 23rd, 2026, Ramrock Real Estate, A Dallas-based real estate investment firm bought Ridgmar Mall for an undisclosed price.
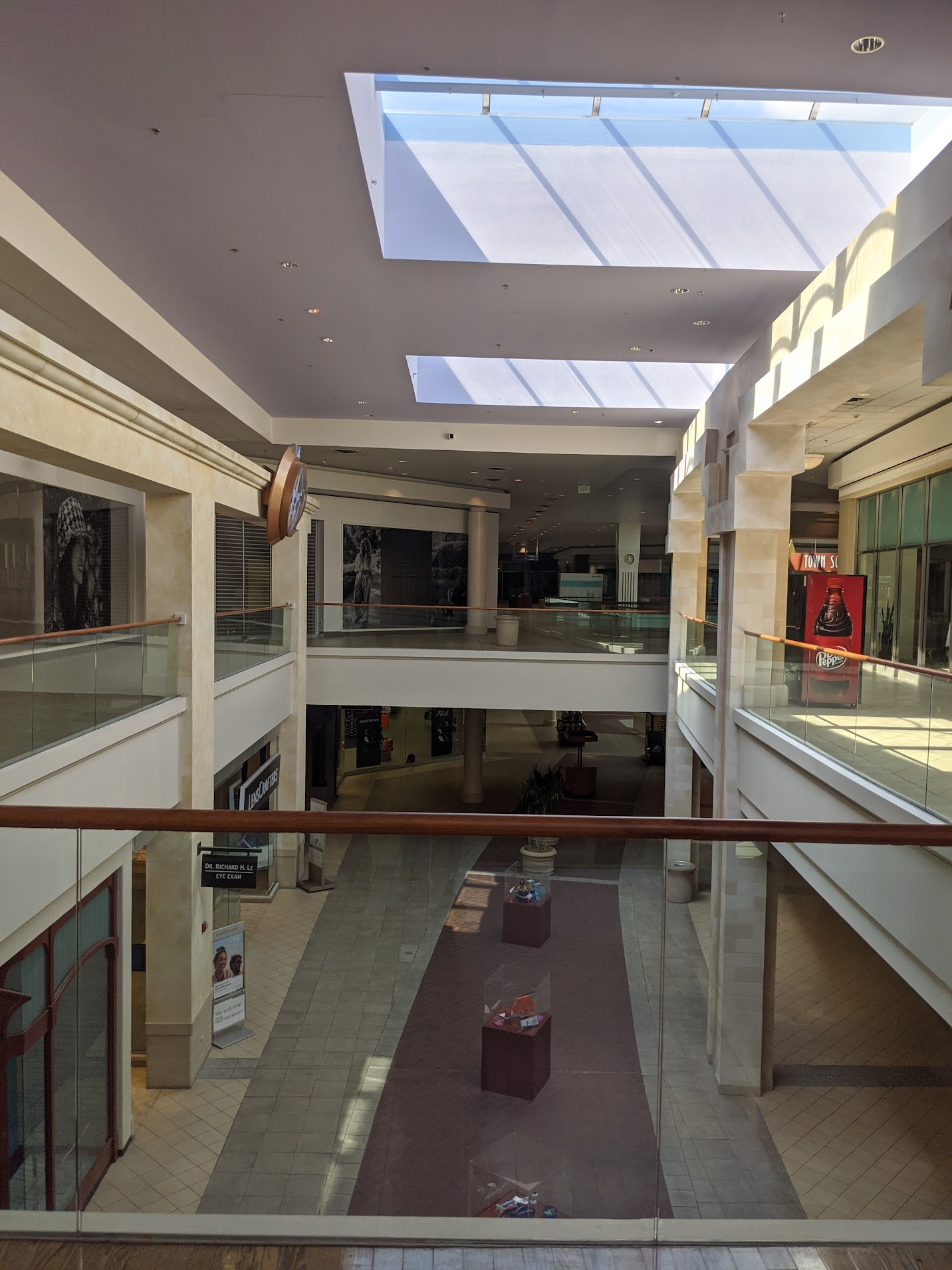
  Neiman Marcus Wing; Facing North, 2020
- On July 16, 2026, it was announced that JCPenney will be closing its Ridgmar Mall location after 50 years of operation. The retailer could not come to an agreement on lease terms for its Ridgmar location, and it will permanently close on November 1, 2026.
- On August 6th, 2026, Ramrock Real Estate publicly announced the acquisition of Ridgmar Mall and their plan to redevelop the mall into a 930,960 square-foot Logistics Center named "Ridgmar 30 Logistics Crossing". Tony Creme, a spokesperson with KBC Advisors, a company working on the redevelopment of the mall, stated that the mall will remain open for some time. Tony also stated that demolition could begin in 12 to 18 months as developers continue talks with tenants and business owners still operating inside the mall. Specific tenants of the planned logistics center have not been disclosed, but it was confirmed that there would be no Data Centers.

== 2024 SeaQuest animal cruelty incident and closure ==
On January 4, a USDA routine inspection found that many animals were living in cramped and unsanitary enclosures. The aquarium was given one month to correct the violations found by the USDA.

In July, three whistleblowers and former employees contacted PETA and provided documentation and footage underlining alleged animal cruelty being conducted by SeaQuest Management. The whistleblowers claimed that many marine animals were being severely neglected, leading to the death of many marine animals, including two nurse sharks, Icarus and Achilles, who died of starvation.

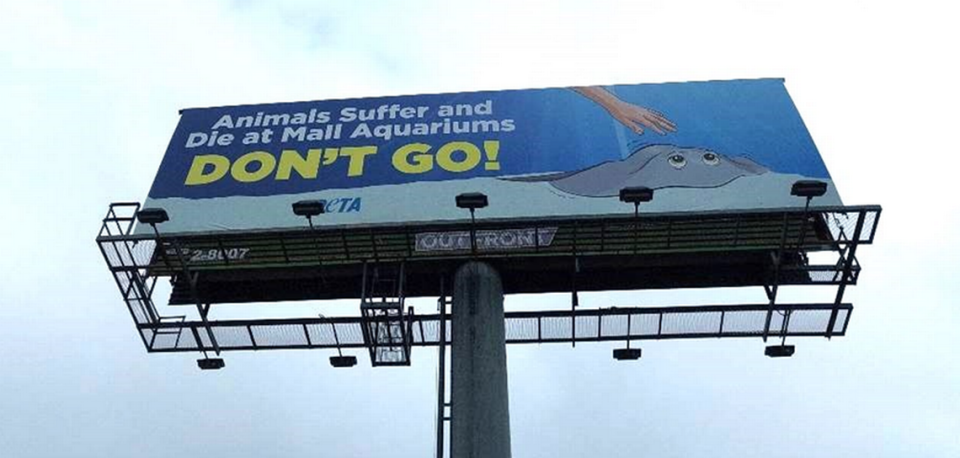
PETA-sponsored billboard, informing Fort Worth residents to avoid SeaQuest.

On August 12, after a failed attempt to work with Fort Worth Animal Control to handle the situation, PETA sent a letter to the Tarrant County District Attorney, Phil Sorrells, requesting that his office launch an immediate investigation, including criminal investigations into SeaQuest. Sorrells forwarded the information given in the request to the Fort Worth Police Department. On August 16 the Fort Worth Police Department launched an investigation into the claims of animal cruelty and deaths made by the whistleblowers.

In September, the Fort Worth Police Department closed the investigation into SeaQuest, stating that the police department was not the appropriate agency to investigate. In the same month, PETA put up billboards in the vicinity of Ridgmar Mall prompting Fort Worth residents not to visit the aquarium.

On October 28, SeaQuest of Fort Worth officially ceased operations, and closed its doors permanently. As a result of the animal cruelty allegations and subsequent Fort Worth store closure, on December 2, SeaQuest Holdings, LLC filed for chapter 11 bankruptcy, reporting $1 million in assets but more than $10 million in liabilities.

In April 2025, SeaQuest Holdings, LLC, ceased operations after the last Seaquest aquarium located in Woodbridge Township, New Jersey was sold and rebranded into Woodbridge Aquarium & Wildlife Center.

== Gallery ==
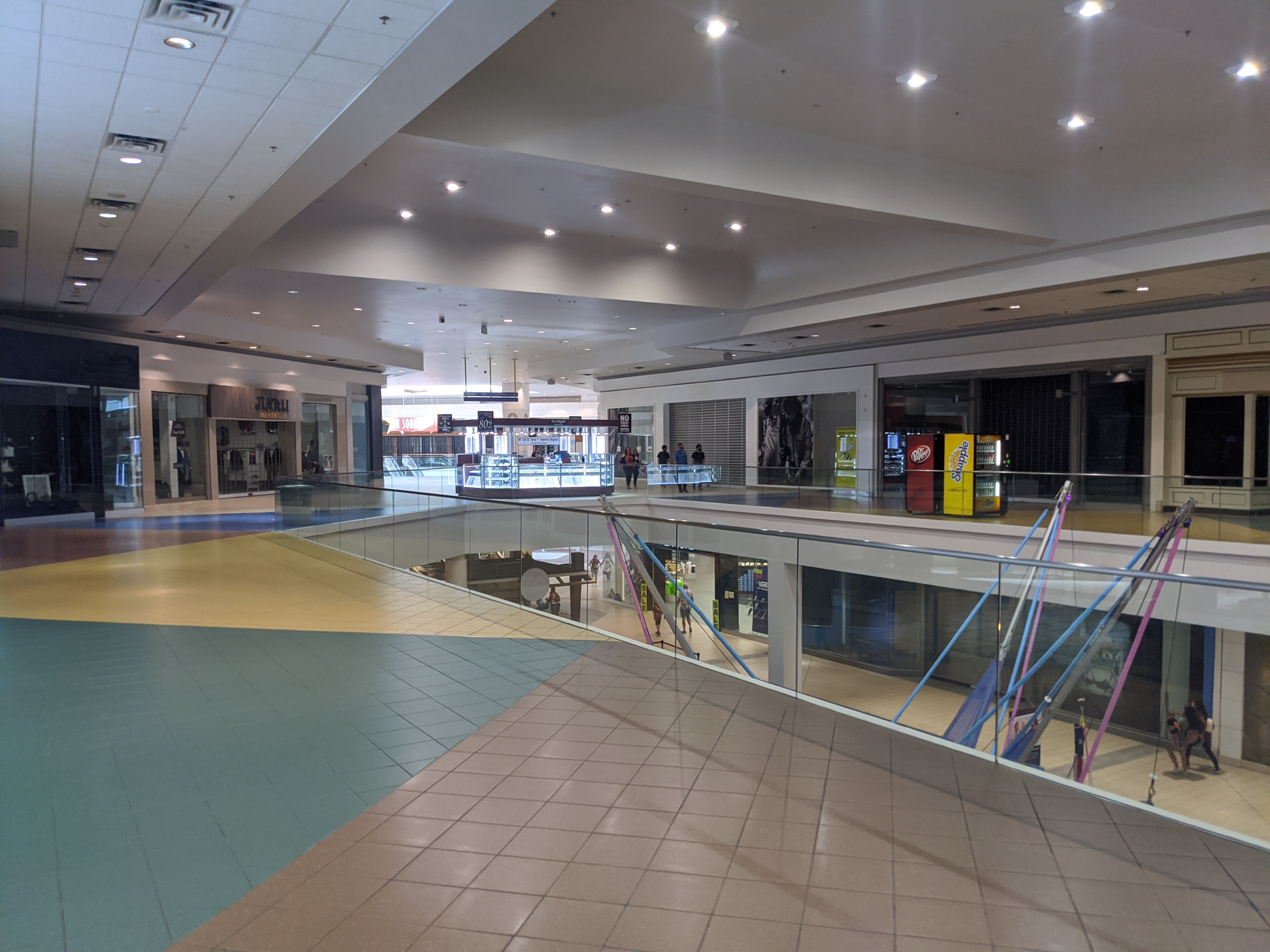
Center court (Note: All images are dated August 2020)

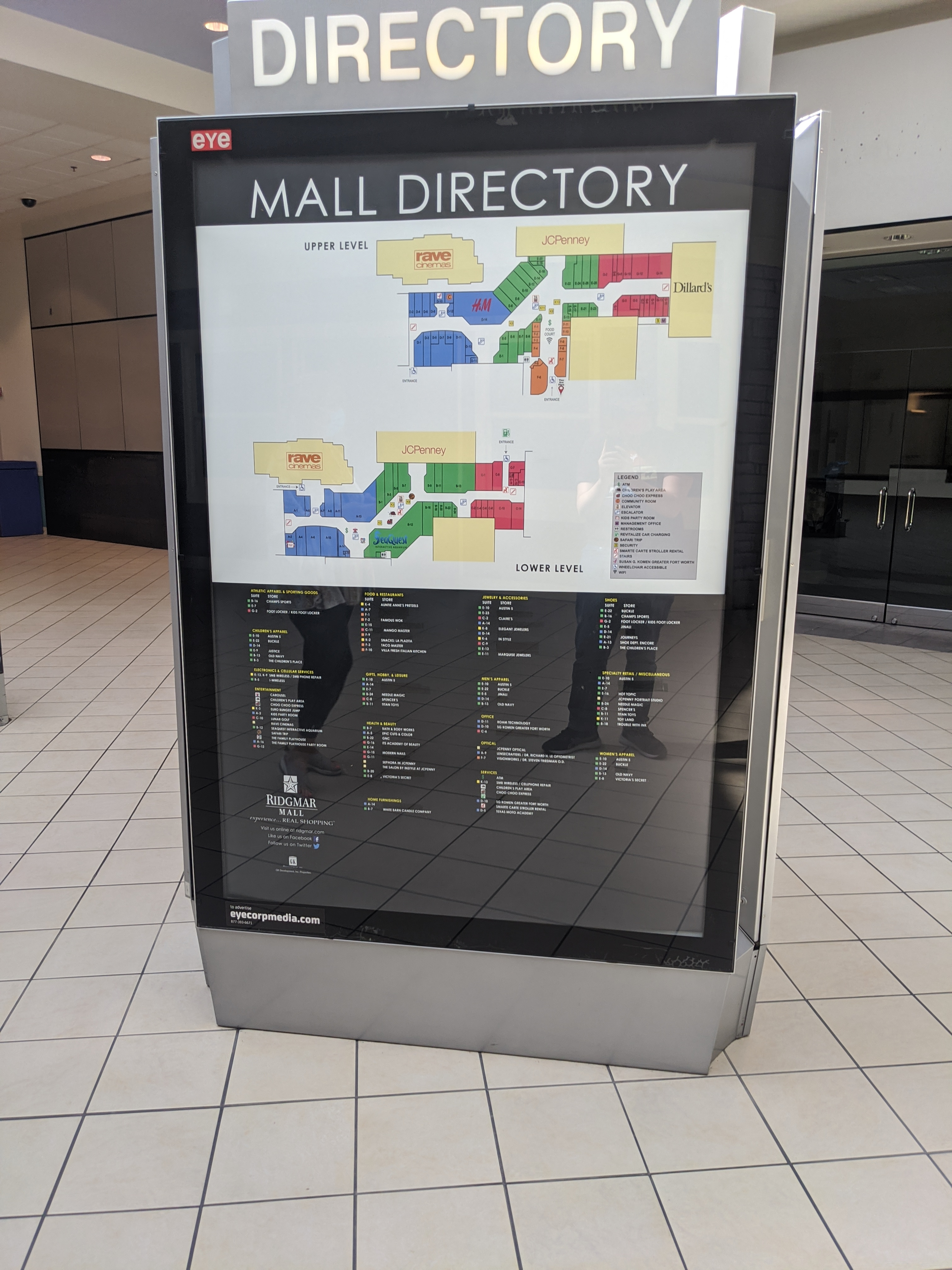
Mall directory

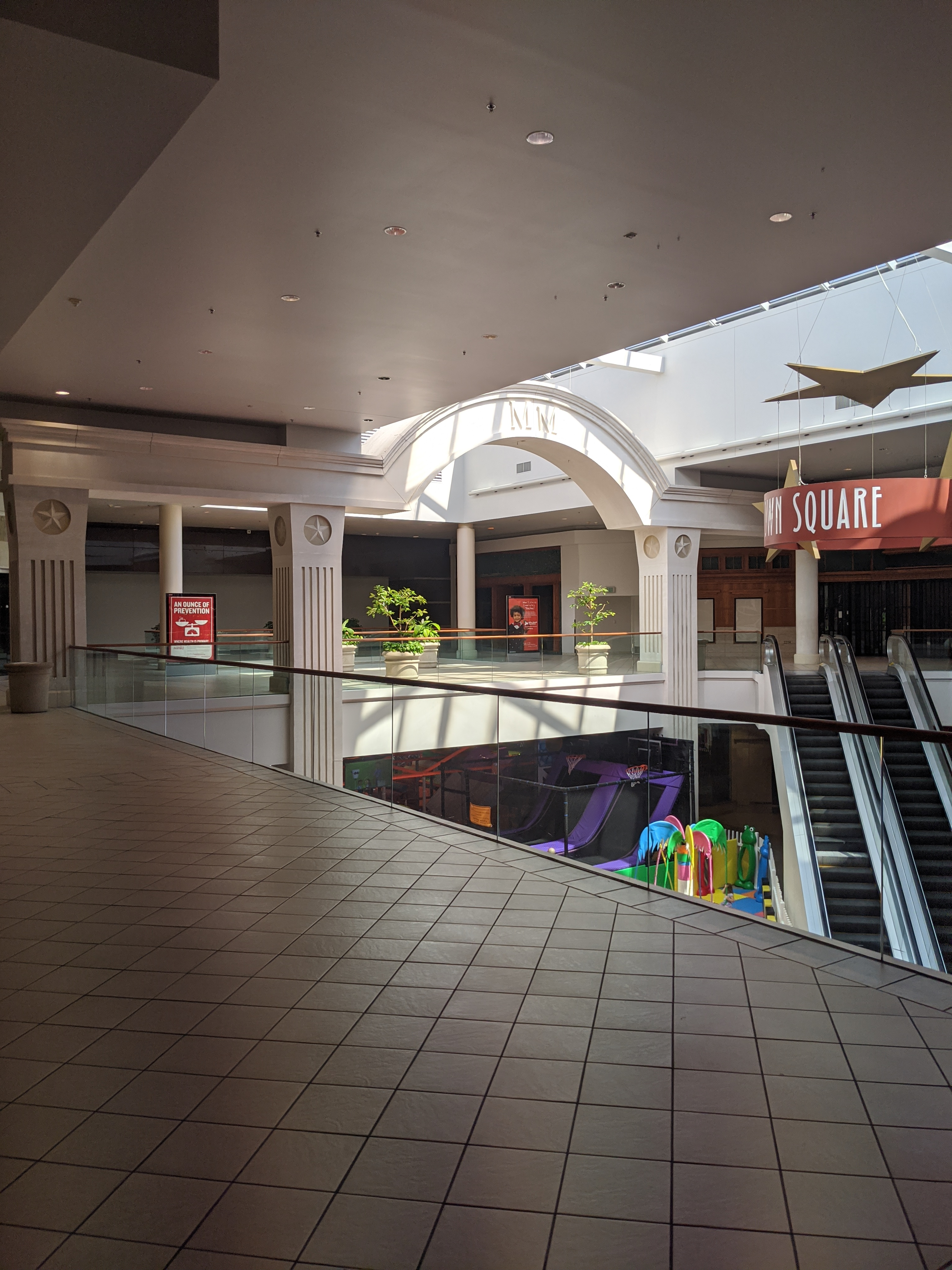
Macy's court

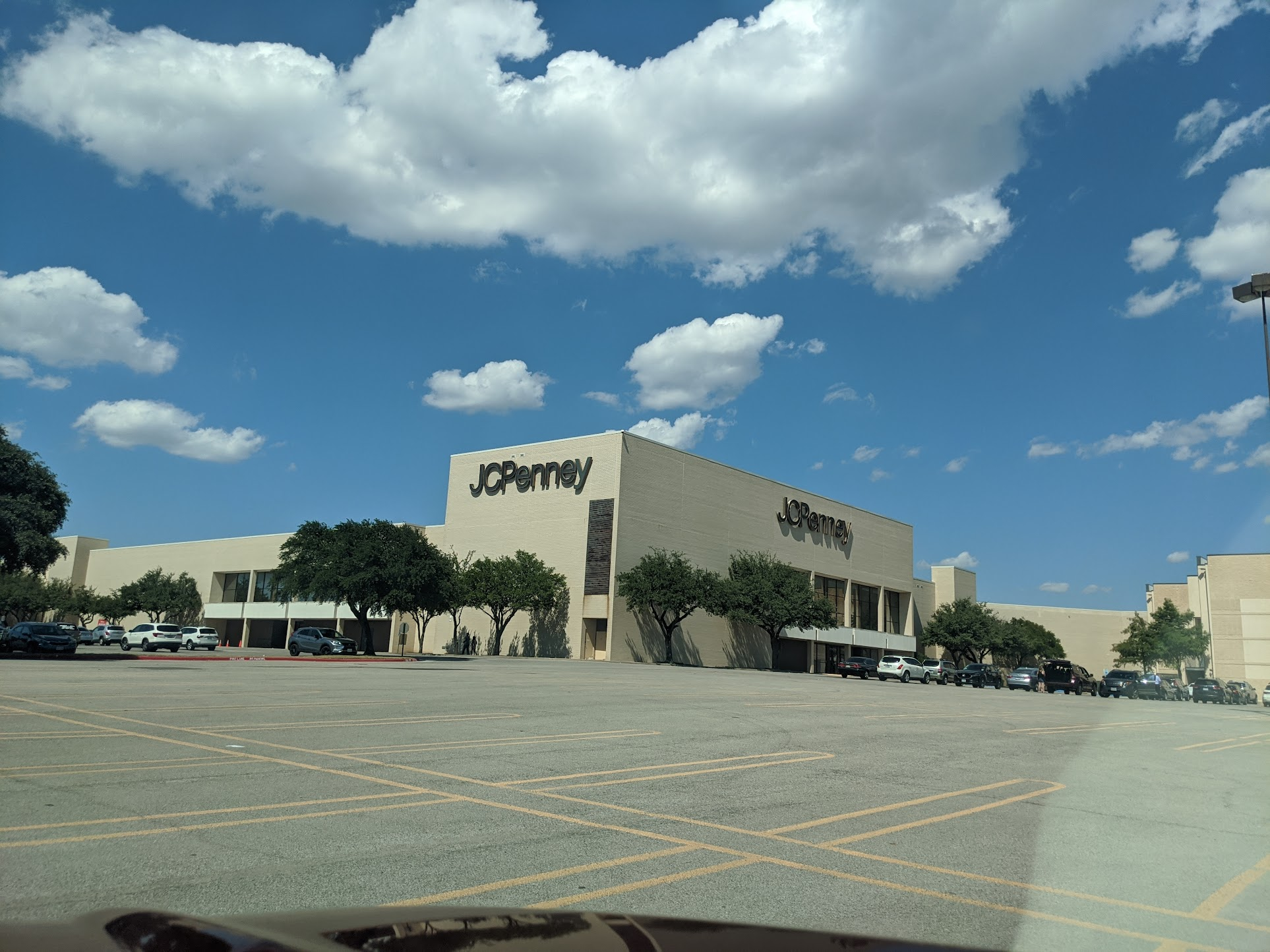
JCPenney exterior

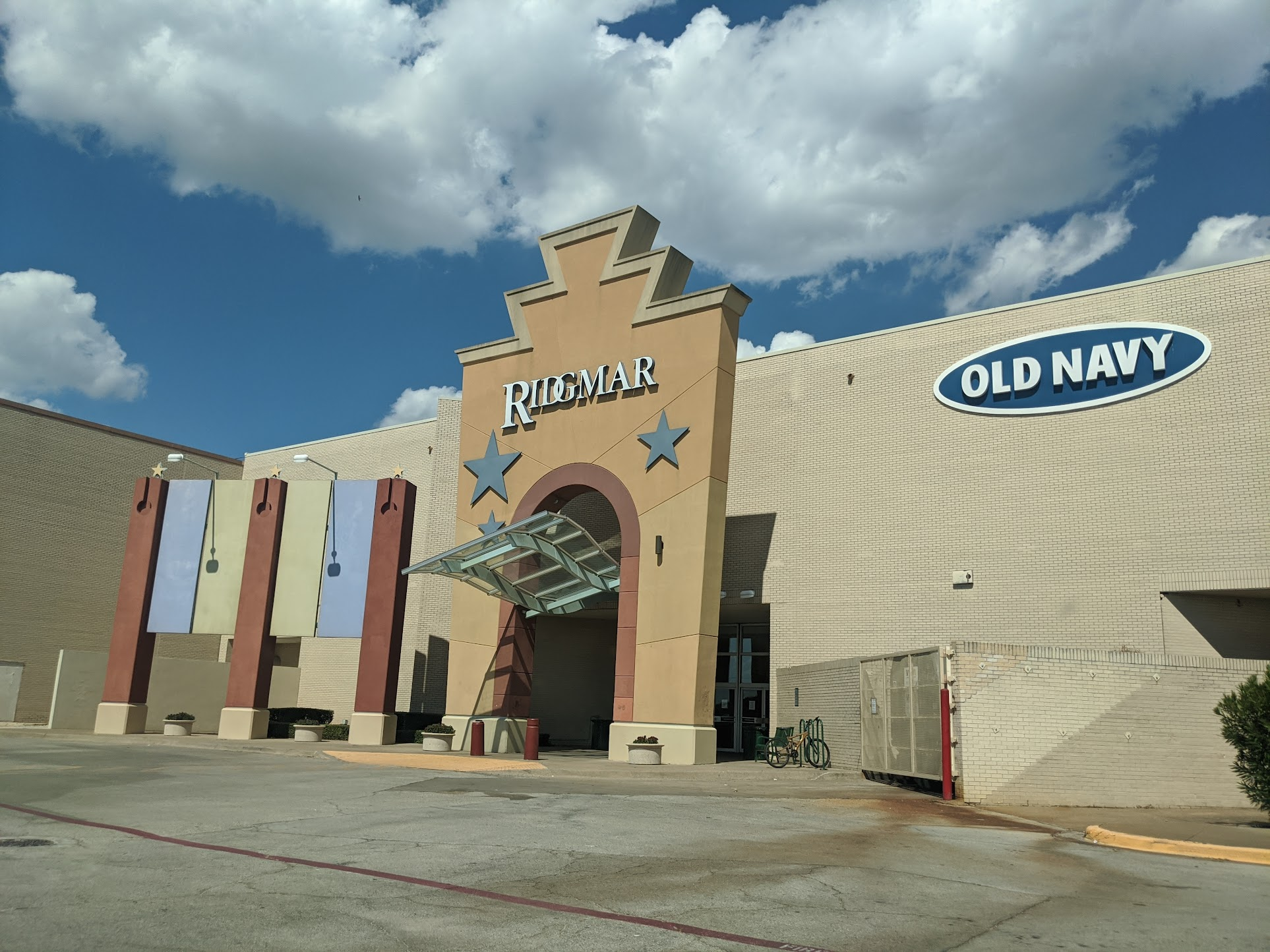
Old Navy entrance

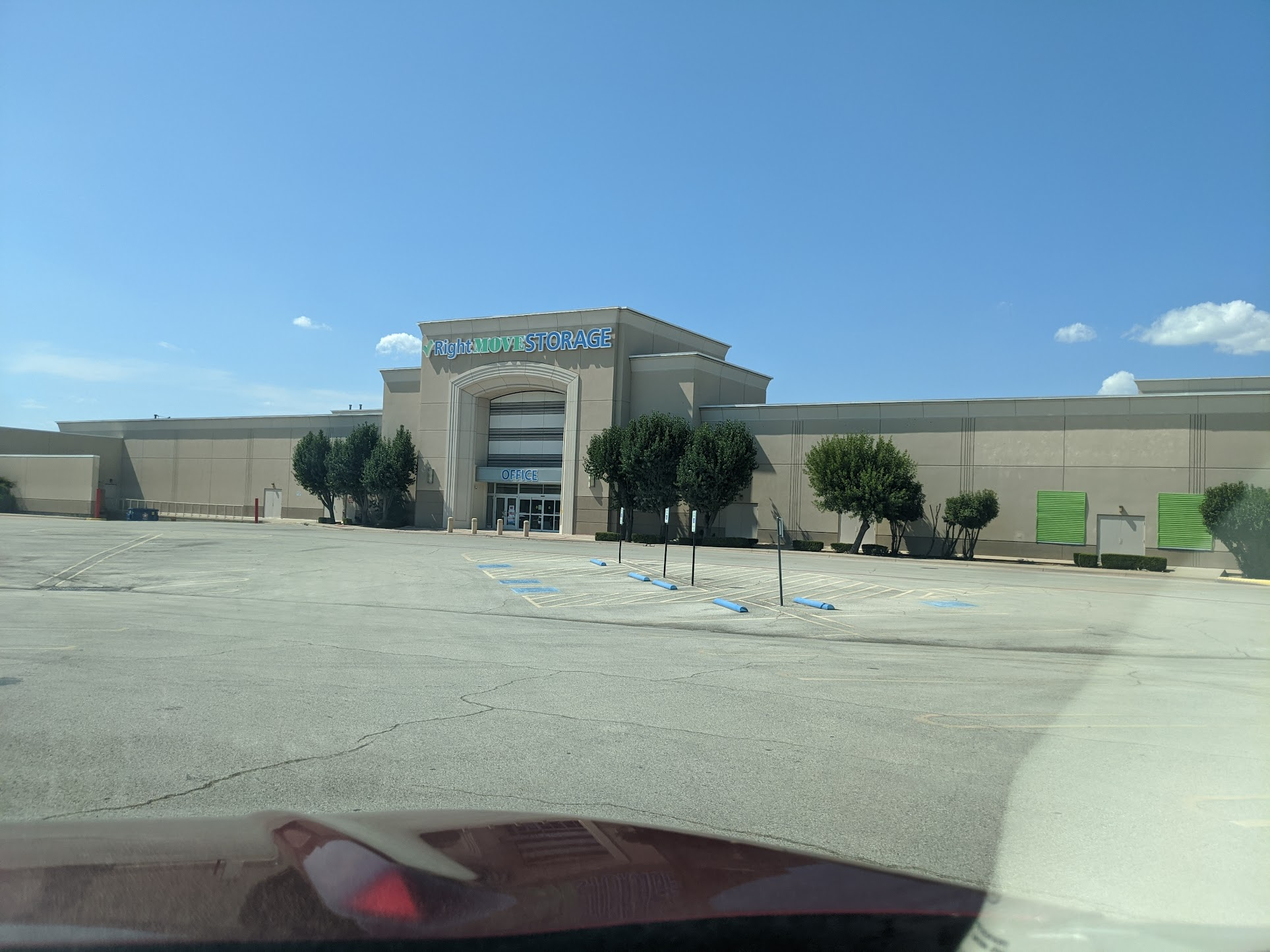
Right Move Storage

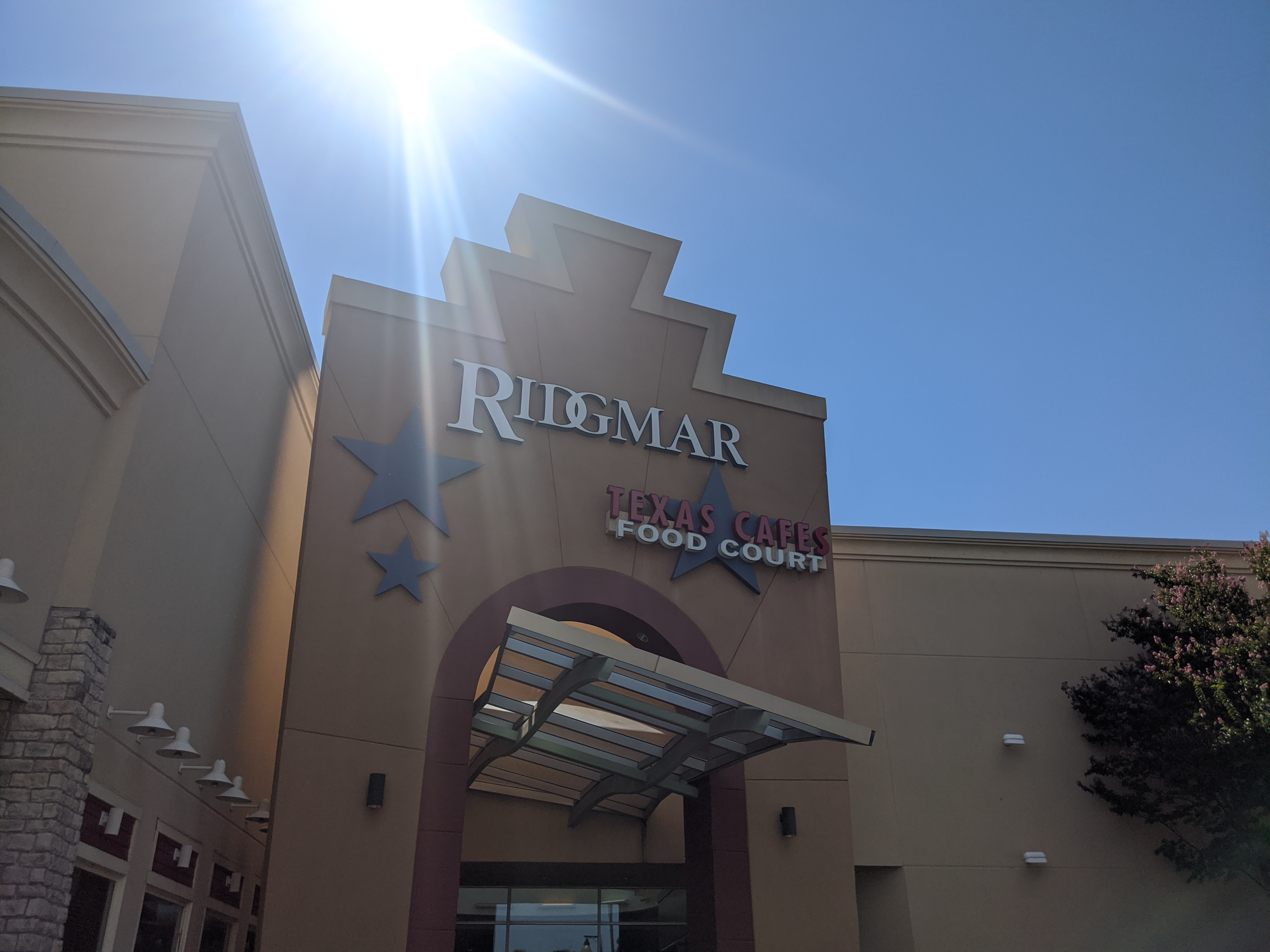
Food court entrance
