= Portland Aquarium =

Defunct aquarium in Oregon, United States

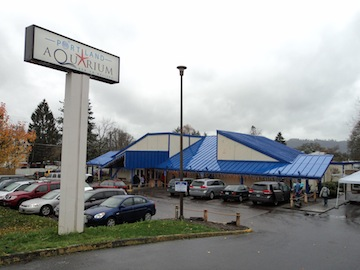
- Interactive map of Portland Aquarium
- 45.405°N 122.624°W
- Date opened: December 15, 2012
- Date closed: February 16, 2016
- Location: 16323 SE McLoughlin, Oak Grove, Oregon, United States
- Land area: 2 acres (0.81 ha)
- Floor space: 12,500 ft^{2} (1,160 m^{2})
- No. of species: 2,500
- Website: portlandaquarium.net

The Portland Aquarium was a 12,500-square-foot (1,160 m^{2}) for-profit aquarium in Oak Grove, Oregon, United States that opened to the public on December 15, 2012.

On February 16, 2016 the aquarium closed and the animals were distributed to other aquariums in its chain of private, for-profit aquariums. Many of the animals were sold to third parties. One of the founders, Vince Covino, went on to launch a chain of other aquariums and interactive wildlife attractions called SeaQuest.

== Organization ==
The Portland Aquarium was a private, for-profit aquarium built with funding provided by an investment group. According to the owners, the for-profit model was chosen to allow the aquarium to be built quickly. The aquarium was constructed in a leased former steakhouse in Oak Grove. It was initially proposed to be called the "Oregon Aquarium."

The Portland Aquarium was a limited liability company whose current members are Crystal Covino, David Rowe and Shane Shimada. The founding owners, in 2012, were brothers Vince and Ammon Covino, and Marc Gottlieb of Boise, ID. Vince and Ammon Covino also were involved in starting the Idaho Aquarium in Boise and the Austin Aquarium in Texas. The Idaho Aquarium has since been taken over by a new director and new board members, in response to legal problems and controversies involving Ammon Covino and his co-founder, Chris Conk.

Portland Aquarium was not an accredited member of the Association of Zoos and Aquariums (AZA) or the Zoo and Aquarium Association (ZAA); as of August 2013 it was "taking the steps necessary to become AZA and ZAA accredited."

The aquarium closed on February 16, 2016. Founder Vince Covino, went on to launch a chain of other non-profit aquariums and interactive wildlife attractions called SeaQuest.

== Features ==
The Portland Aquarium featured 30 exhibits displaying more than 2,500 species. Animals exhibited included sharks and stingrays, a giant Pacific octopus, a jellyfish exhibit, a cold water tank with fish found off the Oregon Coast, and warm water tanks and tide pools with tropical fish. In addition to aquatic and marine exhibits, the aquarium included a rainforest room with animals like tree frogs, lizards, and lorikeets. The Portland Aquarium was intended to be a “hands-on” educational experience that would provide ample opportunity to pet and feed aquarium animals. Most exhibits were geared toward children about age 10. The aquarium was located on a two-acre site that was zoned to permit the aquarium to build outdoor exhibits in the future. Proposed future exhibits included a 30,000-gallon shark tank and a seal exhibit.

== Controversies ==
One of the original co-owners of the Portland Aquarium, Ammon Covino, was arrested on February 21, 2013, in Boise, Idaho, on charges of illegally harvesting marine animals. He later pleaded guilty to conspiring to illegally obtain sharks and rays from the wild in Florida and was sentenced to a year and one day in prison. In October 2015, he was rearrested for allegedly violating terms of his two-years of supervised release by getting involved again in the family aquariums.

At least two senior employees of the Portland Aquarium, including a veterinarian, quit their jobs at the aquarium citing concerns about how the animals were being treated. Along with this, a former employee from the Portland aquarium showed to The Oregonian a death log of animals that had died in the aquarium from February 18 to May 16, 2013. The death log contained over 200 animals that died during that time, causing much controversy and making the Oregon Humane Society launch an investigation to the aquarium. The aquarium has been subject to citizen protests at the site.
