= Austin Aquarium =

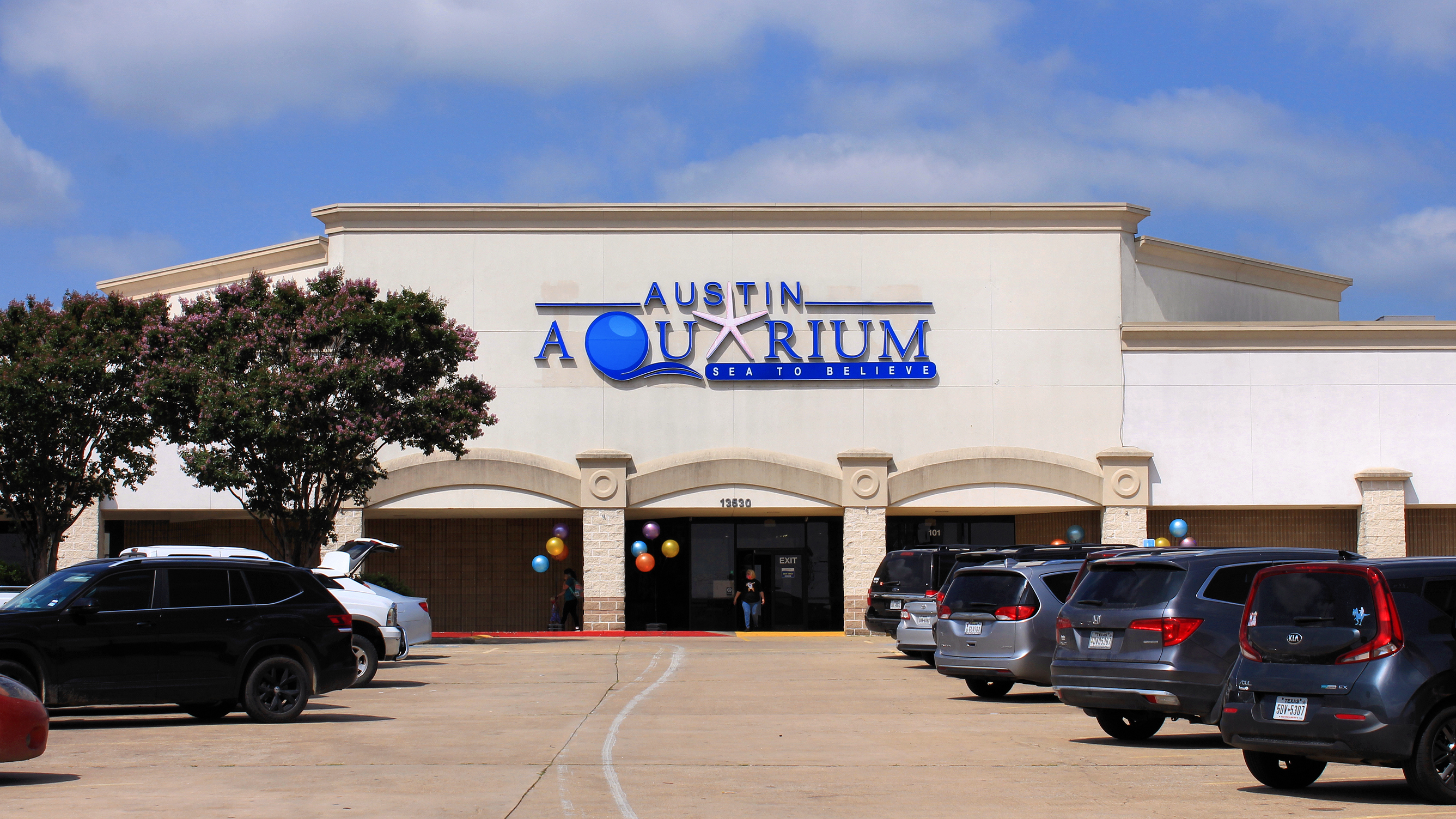
- Interactive map of Austin Aquarium
- 30.45004°N 97.79231°W
- Date opened: December 12, 2013
- Location: Austin, Texas
- Floor space: 22,000 square feet (2,000 m^{2})
- No. of animals: 8,000
- Website: www.austinaquarium.com

The Austin Aquarium is a for profit aquarium located in Austin, Texas, United States, that opened to the public December 12, 2013 and includes birds, fish and other amphibians. The aquarium is owned and operated by Crysty Covino, the wife of former owner and convicted animal trafficker Ammon Covino.

== History ==
The Austin Aquarium was founded by brothers Ammon and Vince Covino. There was controversy leading up to its opening based on their history in other cities, and the Covinos were issued a citation from the city in July 2013 for keeping animals at the site without a permit, and animal-rights group PETA called for the aquarium to receive a full inspection.

On August 2nd 2022 and August 24th 2022, the Austin Aquarium received warnings from the USDA for violations of improper handling of animals.

== See also ==
- San Antonio Aquarium
- SeaQuest Interactive Aquariums
