= Greensboro Science Center =

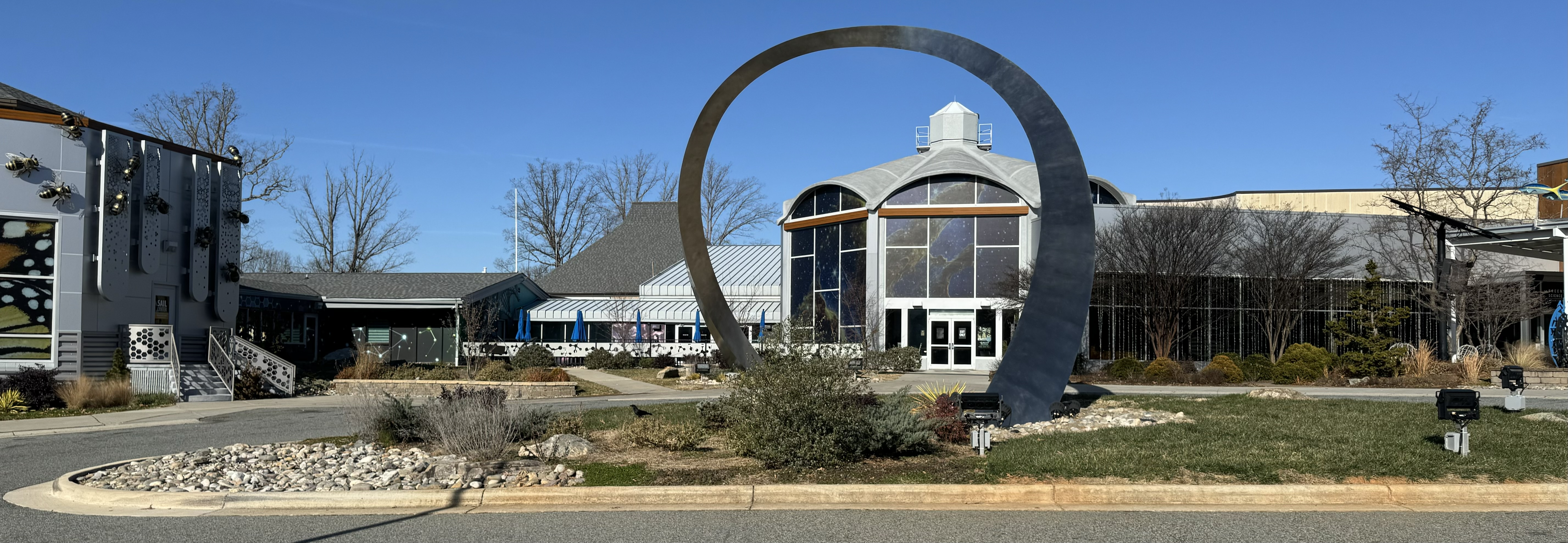
- Interactive map of Greensboro Science Center
- 36.1299°N 79.8341°W
- Date opened: October 15, 1957
- Location: Greensboro, North Carolina, United States
- Annual visitors: 600,744 (July 2022 to June 2023)
- Memberships: AZA, AAM
- Major exhibits: OmniSphere Theater, Animal Discovery Zoological Park, Wiseman Aquarium, SKYWILD, SciPlay Bay
- Website: www.greensboroscience.org

The Greensboro Science Center (formerly known as the Natural Science Center of Greensboro, originally the Greensboro Junior Museum) is a science museum and zoological park established in 1957 and located in Greensboro, North Carolina, United States. It has been accredited by the Association of Zoos and Aquariums (AZA) since 2008, and is a member of the American Alliance of Museums (AAM).

== History ==
The Greensboro Science Center (GSC) was established in 1957 as the Greensboro Junior Museum. By its 40th anniversary in 1997, it was attracting some 200,000 visitors each year, and attendance has continued to grow to 434,718 as of 2017.

The current executive director, Glenn Dobrogosz, was hired in 2004

The facility received accreditation by the Association of Zoos and Aquariums in 2008, this allows for guests to utilize the AZA's reciprocity program where they can get discounts on their admission at the Greensboro Science Center when they have a membership with a fellow AZA organization.

As part of a $20 million makeover, the GSC opened Time Warner Cable's Extreme Weather Gallery in May 2011, and the HealthQuest exhibit in June 2011, however, the HealthQuest exhibit is currently no longer on view to the public, and has since been cleared out to make space for temporary exhibits and events.

On May 2, 2015, the Greensboro Science Center opened its tree top adventure park, Skywild.

On June 4, 2021 the newest expansion to the Greensboro Science Center, Revolution Ridge opened to the public and is the largest addition in the Center's history.

== Attractions ==
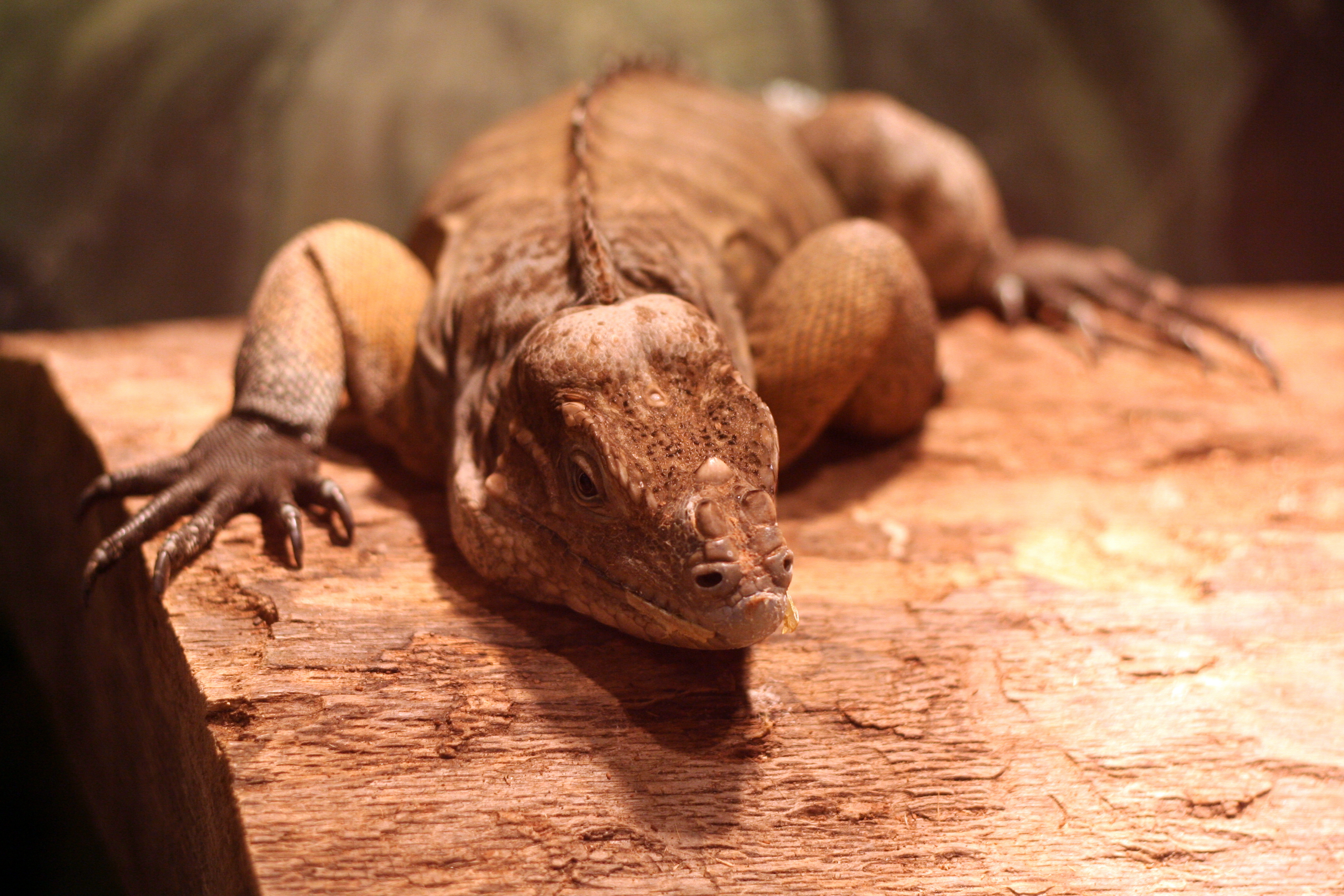
Rhinoceros iguana at the Greensboro Science Center

The Animal Discovery Zoological Park is home to animals including red pandas, Sumatran tigers, okapis, pygmy hippos, maned wolves, servals, sand cats, fishing cats, white-nosed coati, meerkats, fossa, black howler monkeys, silvery gibbons, red ruffed lemurs, ring-tailed lemurs, cassowaries, and Aldabra tortoises, and is designed to showcase the "Science of Survival." Attractions within the zoo include the Friendly Farm, Revolution Ridge, and Davis Kelly Fountain of Youth and Discovery.

The Museum includes SciPlay Bay, Time Warner Cable's Extreme Weather Gallery, touch labs that include live snakes, lizards, and invertebrates, and Prehistoric Passages: Realm of Dragons, which houses a komodo dragon that moves between an inside exhibit and outdoor enclosure in the zoo.

The OmniSphere Theater is a full dome theater where visitors experience everything from the stars to coral reefs in 2D and 3D.

The Wiseman Aquarium is an aquarium that features animals including stingrays, African penguins, Asian small-clawed otters, sharks, mata matas, moon jellies and several other species of fish.

The Rotary Club of Greensboro Carousel is North Carolina's largest carousel featuring animals that showcase the science center (such as Red Pandas, Octopus, Dinosaurs, etc.) along with state mascots (NC State Wolf, UNC TarHeel). The ride is an additional charge, but is built for all ages and abilities.

Winter Wonderlights is Greensboro newest holiday attraction, that features a walkable holiday themed light display, which has been active since 2020.

== Plans for the future ==
In 2009, Greensboro voters considered a $20 million bond referendum for the Natural Science Center. $10 million was used for the SciQuarium, a 250,000-US-gallon (950,000 L) aquarium with more than 75 species of animals and a cownose ray touch tank. $10 million is planned for renovations and expansions of existing parts of the GSC. The master plan for this renovation was developed with the help of Cambridge Seven Associates and Moser-Mayer Phoenix & Associates, and phase 1 (the SciQuarium) opened in the summer of 2013. Phase 2 includes updates to the current museum, and phase 3 included new animals such as pygmy hippos, cassowaries and red pandas in an exhibit called "Endangered Species Village." The final form of which turned into what is referred to today as "Revolution Ridge." As of April 30, 2026, construction is underway to build a rain forest Biodome, which will replace the Discovery House. Construction is expected to finish sometime in the spring or summer of 2027.
