= SeaQuest (aquariums) =

Idaho-based interactive marine life attraction chain

SeaQuest Holdings, LLC
- Trade name: Seaquest
- Type: Private
- Founded: November 2015
- Defunct: April 2025
- Fate: Locations closed or rebranded
- Headquarters: Boise, Idaho, U.S.
- Area served: United States
- Key people: Vince Covino, founder and CEO
- Services: Entertainment, aquariums, petting zoos
- Revenue: $5 million
- Number of employees: 300

SeaQuest Holdings, LLC better known as just SeaQuest, was an interactive marine, exotic mammal, and bird/reptile life attraction chain. It was founded by Vince Covino and featured hands-on animal interactions at shopping malls throughout the United States. The company has no locations. SeaQuest has attracted considerable controversy and legal issues due to concerns over its animal care standards.

== History ==
SeaQuest was established in 2015 by Vince Covino. Prior to the launch of SeaQuest, along with his brother Ammon, founded Portland Aquarium in 2012 (closed 2016), the Austin Aquarium in 2013 and the San Antonio Aquarium in 2014.

SeaQuest opened its first location at Layton, Utah in 2016. This location was followed by one in the Las Vegas area, which also opened in 2016 at The Boulevard Mall. A third location opened in Fort Worth, Texas in 2017.

SeaQuest provides an immersive experience for visitors by allowing guests to touch, feed, and interact with exotic birds, reptiles, mammals, and marine life through hands-on exhibits throughout the aquarium. Although similar to its sister aquariums, SeaQuest locations are usually housed within shopping malls.

SeaQuest's Littleton, Colorado location opened in June 2018. SeaQuest went on to open its fifth location in Folsom in September 2018. The company's location at the Stonecrest Mall opened in 2021 and was the first step of a redevelopment project by Stonecrest Resorts.

In June 2023, the Stonecrest, Georgia location permanently closed. A new aquarium is supposed to be taking over the location. In August 2023, the Trumbull, Connecticut location permanently closed after years of animal welfare violations.

In October 2024, The SeaQuest located in Ridgmar Mall in Fort Worth, Texas permanently closed after PETA launched a campaign against the location for severe animal cruelty that was uncovered by former employees of the location.

In December 2024, SeaQuest filed for Chapter 11 bankruptcy protection after it was revealed that animals and employees were placed in dangerous conditions at the company's locations. The aquariums will remain open during the procedure. In January 2025, SeaQuest announced plans to sell all of its assets for $80,000, including welfare for the animals and the aquariums. The company is currently asking a judge to approve of the sale by February. If the sale does not go forward after February, SeaQuest warned that it may face liquidation.

On February 18, 2025, SeaQuest closed its Roseville aquarium, with animals being transferred to other animal exhibits by April 2025. On March 20, 2025, the Folsom location was sold and rebranded as the NorCal Aquarium and Wildlife Adventures. The last two locations in Woodbridge and Layton were sold off and rebranded by April 2025.

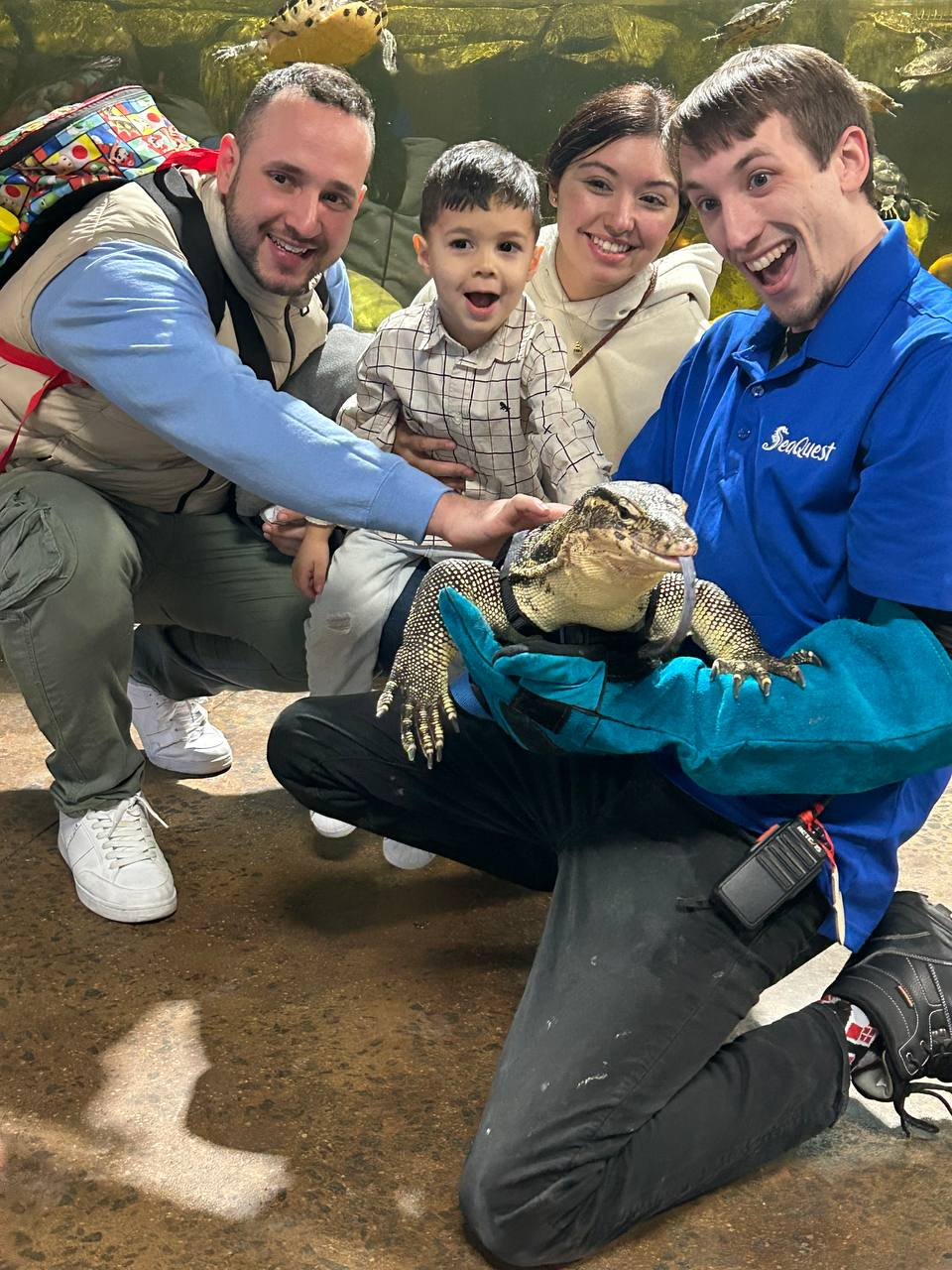
SeaQuest employee with an Asian water monitor

== Locations ==
At its peak, SeaQuest operated ten aquariums across the United States by 2021. The chain began downscaling its operations in 2023, shuttering operations in 2025.

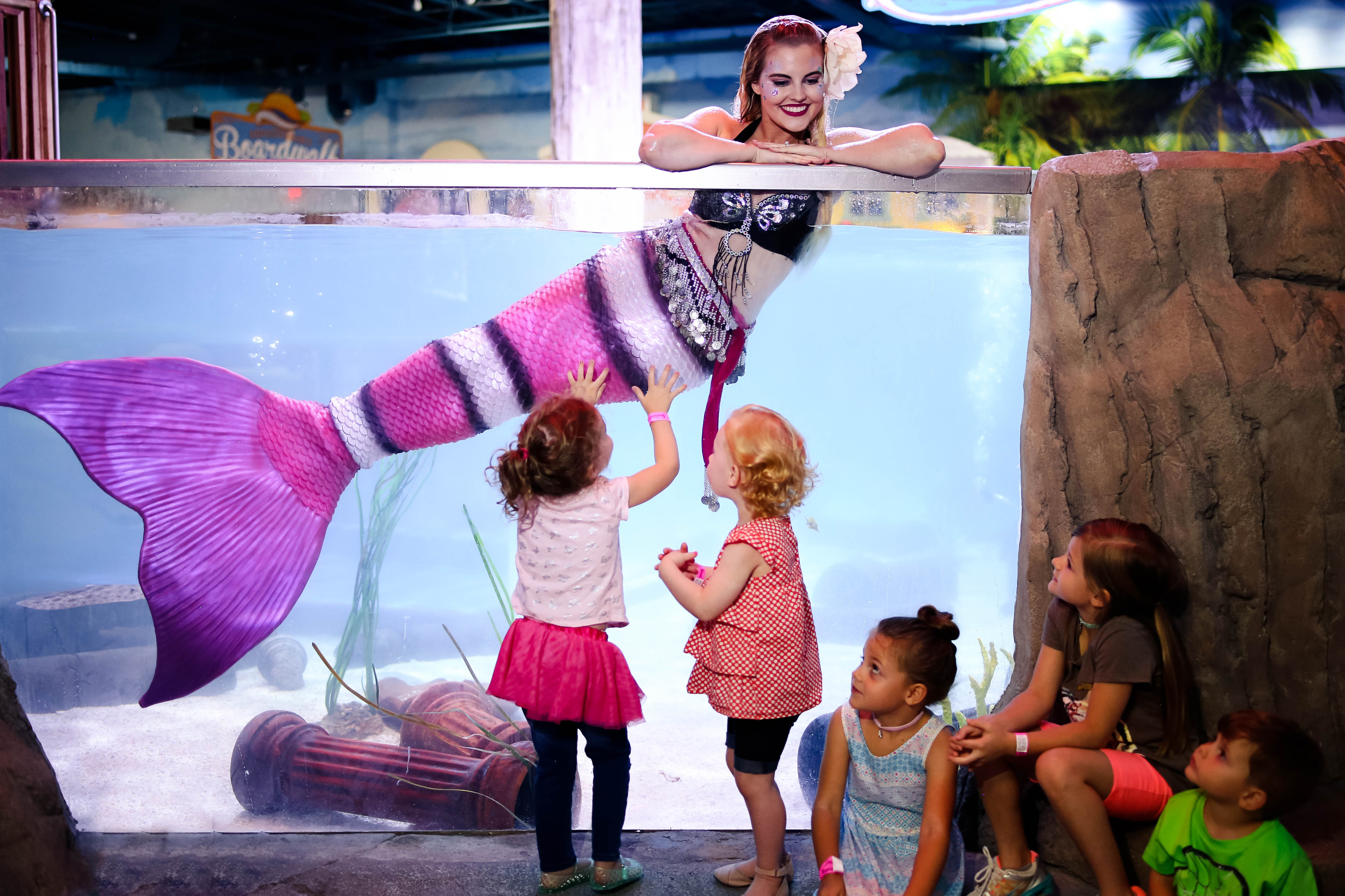
SeaQuest employee dressed as a mermaid

=== Divested locations ===
Location	Date Opened	Date Sold	Operating as
Folsom, California	2018	March 17, 2025	NorCal Aquarium and Wildlife Adventures LLC
Las Vegas, Nevada	2016	March 6, 2025	One World Interactive Aquarium
Layton, Utah	2016	Late March-Early April 2025	Layton Aquarium & Wildlife Encounters
Lynchburg, Virginia	2019	October 18, 2024	Hill City AquaZoo
Stonecrest, Georgia	2021	June 18, 2023	
Woodbridge, New Jersey	2019	April 6, 2025	Woodbridge Aquarium & Wildlife Center

=== Defunct locations ===
Location	Date Opened	Date Closed
Fort Worth, Texas	2017	October 28, 2024
Littleton, Colorado	2018	February 7, 2024
Roseville, Minnesota	2018	February 18, 2025
Trumbull, Connecticut	2019	August 20, 2023

== Community engagement ==
SeaQuest organized an event in collaboration with Layton Communities That Care to support the prevention of underage drinking. In 2021, during the COVID-19 pandemic, SeaQuest's Stonecrest location also offered free COVID vaccinations.^{[} SeaQuest also organized an event for Georbrand Jackson, a 10-year-old who was injured in a drive-by shooting, in December 2021.

== Violations and incidents ==
SeaQuest has been subject to boycott and protests by animal-rights advocates such as PETA and actor Alec Baldwin, who blocked an aquarium from being constructed on Long Island. In addition, SeaQuest has had numerous violations and incidents at its various locations.

=== Littleton, Colorado ===
- Colorado Parks and Wildlife suspended SeaQuest's exhibitor's license for two years due to an abundance of egregious violations related to the animals' welfare at the facility.
- In 2019, a sloth named Flash was burned by a heat lamp on two occasions resulting in significant burns to its face. The employee responsible for the animal's care was charged with cruelty-to-animals, but was found not guilty.
- In 2018, Colorado Parks and Wildlife cited and fined SeaQuest for failing to report the death of a regulated kookaburra and issued warnings for the unlawful importation and possession of six wood ducks, unlawful importation of a caiman and wallaby, five counts of failing to report injuries to humans, and failing to report the deaths of 250 trout.
- In 2018, SeaQuest failed a Colorado Department of Agriculture pre-license inspection. Issues included illegal transfer of koi fish, unsanitary conditions, and allowing visitors to walk through the aviary while birds were grounded, creating a precarious environment where the birds were vulnerable to being stepped on.
- Additional events in 2018 included SeaQuest storing approximately 80 parakeets in an employee's garage after the company was ordered to shut down the interactive aviary, and a state fine for SeaQuest's unlawful procurement of a two-toed sloth and failure to obtain an appropriate license for the animal.
- Approximately 30 injuries involving animal-to-human bites were reported to occur between June 2018 and January 2019.
- Permanently closed on February 4, 2024 due to animal welfare violations.

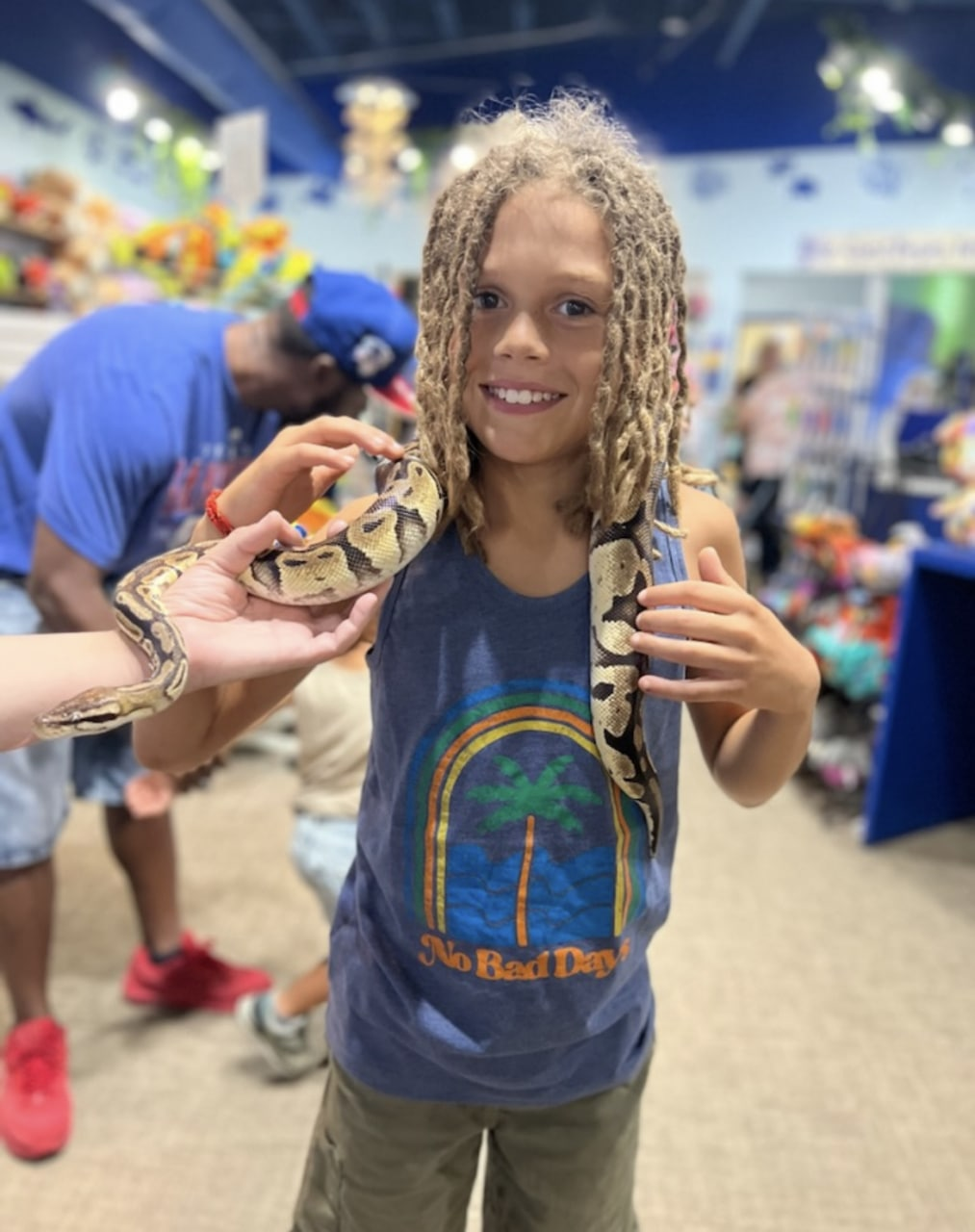
A kid petting a snake at SeaQuest

=== Las Vegas, Nevada ===
- In 2019, Clark County Administrative Services suspended SeaQuest's exotic-animal permit because the facility held unpermitted otters and coatimundi. The agency imposed a $2,000 fine due to an Asian small-clawed otter dying after being caught in a water pool filtration system, and imposed an additional $2,000 fine for unpermitted animal breeding of Asian small-clawed otters.
- In 2018, a capybara named Wesley escaped while en route to a veterinary office and was injured in the process.

=== Fort Worth, Texas ===
- In 2019, the United States Department of Agriculture cited SeaQuest for failing to reduce the risk of injury to visitors during public encounters with an Asian small-clawed otter.
- In 2024, both local and federal officials confirmed the Fort Worth location was under investigation following animal-neglect complaints from former SeaQuest employees. The aquarium closed in October of that year.
