= Grassy Key =

Island in the middle Florida Keys, United States

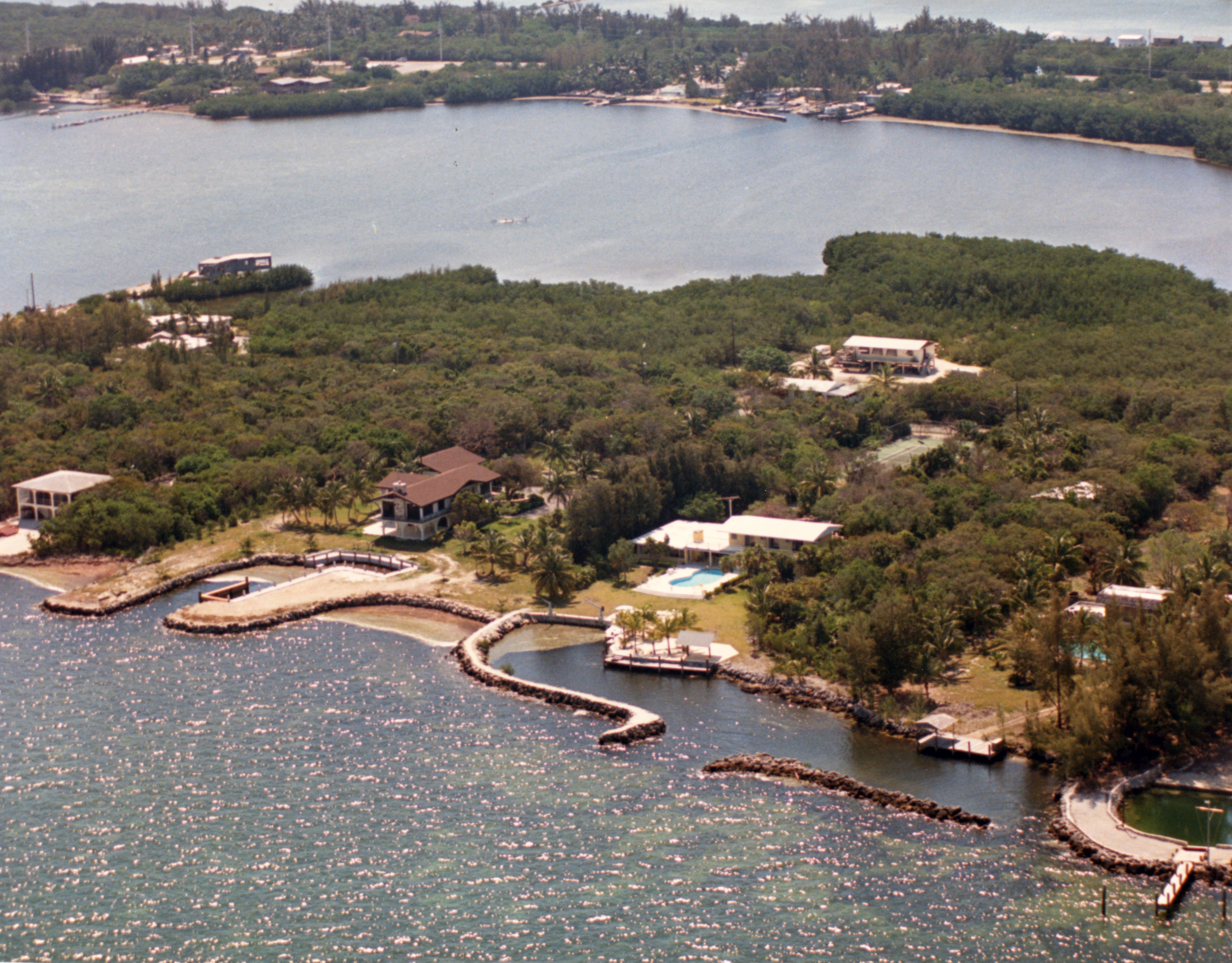
- Aerial view of Grassy Key, October 1987

- Grassy Key Grassy Key (the Caribbean)

Geography
- Location: Gulf of Mexico
- Coordinates: 24.761777°N 80.955291°W
- Archipelago: Florida Keys
- Adjacent to: Florida Straits

Administration
- United States
- State: Florida
- County: Monroe

Grassy Key, Florida, is an island in the middle Florida Keys. It is located on U.S. 1 (or the Overseas Highway), near mile markers 57—60, below the Conch Keys. It has an area of 3.65 km², with a population of 974 as of the census 2000.

It is one of the northernmost islands in a chain of islands that comprises the City of Marathon, Florida. The island or "key"—as the islands are called in parts of Florida—hosts many mom-and-pop-type family resorts - oceanside and bayside, as well as many private residences, although the key itself is sparsely populated in comparison to the original City of Marathon "proper" farther south. The entire key was incorporated into the City of Marathon in 1999.

The Dolphin Research Center is a dolphinarium located in Grassy Key at mile marker 59.

== History of Grassy Key ==
Florida became a state in 1845, but the keys weren't officially incorporated until 1870 after they were surveyed by Charles F. Smith. According to locals the key was named after an old settler around 1855, but other documents state the key as being named "Ellis Island before 1855." The early pioneers suffered from clouds of mosquitos and no-see-ums. They lived in thatched-roofed houses that were regularly mowed down by hurricanes, and were cut off from civilization because the island was only navigable by boat. The FEC built the railroad in 1908, and it brought some prosperity to the area. It connected the island to civilization and opened up an opportunity for a tourism industry, and ease of moving goods such as pineapple, key limes, sponges, charcoal, and shark skins.

Grassy Key's first postmaster was appointed on August 26, 1908. He was known as Julius W. Taylor from the Crainlyn Post Office. The original name of the island was Crainlyn after the Crain family. The Crains were the landholders of Grassy Key before being incorporated into Florida. Julius W Taylor was the first person known to advertise tourism to the Grassy Key area. He advertised to the Jacksonville area, stating, "if you were suffering from the Jacksonville heat, come to Grassy key where the ocean and Gulf breezes steadily blow."

In 1925, the first highway was completed, with ferry landings to complete the 40-mile (64 km) gap between the Lower Matcombe Keys and Key West. With the addition of the highway running through Grassy Key, Ed Neff's Bonefish Lunchroom was built in 1935 complete with gas pumps to accommodate tourists who could now drive to Key West instead of taking a ferry. This highway was nicknamed the Overseas Highway.

The first year recorded with a disastrous hurricane was 1935. This hurricane washed out the lower portion of the Overseas Highway, destroyed the ferry station, and washed the railroad out to sea. Casualties occurred, but the exact numbers are unknown and not very well documented. Most of the casualties were World War I veterans who were housed in tents while they constructed the Overseas Highway bridges.

With the rebuilding of the Upper Keys, the railway was abandoned, and telephone lines were incorporated around 1938.

During WWII, the Overseas Highway was improved and named US Route 1. The improvements were made for the Navy Support Services and opened more of the Lower Keys that were previously difficult to reach.

Dolphin Research Center

In the 1940s, Milton Santini and his wife Virginia opened the Santini's Porpoise Training School. Prior to opening the training school, Milton was a commercial fisherman who caught porpoises for public and private aquaria. Milton cared deeply about these animals and even went as far as bringing them inside his home during a particularly threatening hurricane. He kept them alive by keeping them wet with damp towels until the storm passed.

Milton discovered the ability to train porpoises after he suffered a broken back. For physical therapy, he would sit in a recliner near one of his man-made bays, and squeeze a black rubber ball. After dropping it one day, Mitzi, one of the new untrained dolphins, retrieved the ball for him, creating a game for the both of them.

Mitzi went through further games and training; later she became known as Flipper from the movie in 1963. Mitzi died in 1972, and a large memorial was placed on the ground shortly after. Milton sold the training school shortly after Mitzi's death to Wombetco Corporation, which dubbed the school Flipper's Training School. In 1983, Jayne and Armando Rodriguez opened the Dolphin Research Center as a nonprofit organization; it is still open today at mile marker #59 and is the primary attraction in Grassy Key.

== See also ==
- Gambian pouched rat
