= Dolphin Research Center =

- Interactive map of Dolphin Research Center
- 24.76696°N 80.94552°W
- Date opened: 1984
- Location: Grassy Key, Florida, United States
- No. of animals: 31
- No. of species: 3
- Memberships: AMMPA IMATA
- Major exhibits: Dolphin lagoons, California sea lion lagoon
- Website: dolphins.org

The Dolphin Research Center (DRC) is a dolphinarium on Grassy Key, Florida. The 90,000-square-foot (8,400 m^{2}) series of saltwater lagoons is home to several dolphins and California sea lions.

== History ==
Fisherman Milton Santini opened Santini's Porpoise School in 1958, which he operated until 1972. Santini blasted lagoons into the seashore with dynamite to create deeper pens for the dolphins. One of Santini's dolphins, Mitzi, and four others starred in the film Flipper and its 1964 sequel. The property was sold and renamed as Flipper's Sea School in 1972 and operated under this name until 1977. At this point, it was purchased by Anti-whaling activist Jean Paul Fortom-Gouin. Fortom-Gouin closed the property to the public, running it as the Institute for Delphinid Research until 1983. The Dolphin Research Center was founded in 1984 by Armando ("Mandy") and Jayne Rodriguez.

== Animals ==
As of 2026, DRC listed 28 dolphins as currently residing at its facility. Twenty-seven of the dolphins are bottlenose dolphins, while the other dolphin is an Atlantic spotted dolphin. Twenty-two of the dolphins were born at Dolphin Research Center. with two being adopted from other facilities. Three of the bottlenose dolphins and the Atlantic spotted dolphins were rescued. as well as one of the California sea lions "Lina", was rescued near Catalina Island in California.

It is also home to four california sea lions, three harbor seals, six parrots, and two African spurred tortoises.

Dolphin Research Center was instrumental in the safe relocation and adoption of seven animals during the 2026 closure of the Miami Seaquarium

== Guest experience ==
Visitors to Dolphin Research Center can enter under general admission to see the dolphins and sea lions demonstrate behaviors, research, training, and other activities in narrated behavior sessions throughout the day. They can also pay to experience a variety of interactive experiences either in the water or from a floating dock. In addition to the general admission price, guests can pay more to interact with dolphins in the water. Dolphin Research Center hosts an "Ultimate Trainer for the Day" program where guests can shadow and participate in activities with trainers and a "Researcher Experience" where they can shadow the center's research team. Other guest experiences can include painting with a dolphin or providing enrichment.

== Research ==
DRC staff members conduct and publish research on dolphins. They study a wide variety of areas in dolphin cognition, behavior, and husbandry. These are just a few of the many studies they have published:

In a 2021 study titled "Anthropogenic Noise Impairs Cooperation in Bottlenose Dolphins" researchers sought to understand the impact of human disturbance on wild dolphin populations. While animals are known to use acoustic and other behavioral mechanisms to compensate for increasing noise at the individual level, our understanding of how noise impacts social animals working together remains limited. They investigated the effect of noise on coordination between two bottlenose dolphins performing a cooperative task. DRC previously demonstrated that the dolphin dyad can use whistles to coordinate their behavior, working together with extreme precision. By equipping each dolphin with a sound-and-movement recording tag (DTAG-37) and exposing them to increasing levels of anthropogenic noise, we show that both dolphins nearly doubled their whistle durations and increased whistle amplitude in response to increasing noise. While these acoustic compensatory mechanisms are the same as those frequently used by wild cetaceans they were insufficient to overcome the effect of noise on behavioral coordination. Indeed, cooperative task success decreased in the presence of noise, dropping from 85% during ambient noise control trials to 62.5% during the highest noise exposure. This is the first study to demonstrate in any non-human species that noise impairs communication between conspecifics performing a cooperative task. Cooperation facilitates vital functions across many taxa and our findings highlight the need to account for the impact of disturbance on functionally important group tasks in wild animal populations.

In a 2010 study titled "Blindfolded Imitation in a Bottlenose Dolphin (Tursiops truncatus)" and a follow-up 2013 study titled "Switching strategies: a dolphin's use of passive and active acoustics to imitate motor actions", researchers tested the ability of a blindfolded dolphin to imitate the behavior of another dolphin or human. The blindfolded dolphin was able to replicate the behaviors of fellow dolphins by presumably recognizing the sound; when copying behaviors of a human in the water, it switched to using echolocation to ascertain the behavior being modeled.

In a 2018 publication titled "Bottlenose dolphins can understand their partner's role in a cooperative task" DRC staff tested the ability of bottlenose dolphins to coordinate their behavior to receive a reward. In a trial, pairs of dolphins were instructed to swim across their lagoons and press an underwater button, with each dolphin assigned a button. In some trials, both dolphins were given the command at the same time; in other trials, one dolphin would receive the command up to 20 seconds before the other. Trials were considered successful if the dolphins pressed the buttons at the same time (within one second). The dolphins learned to coordinate their actions, with the first dolphin to receive the command eventually waiting for the second dolphin to receive its command before acting. This demonstrated that dolphins are capable of coordinated action in pursuit of a common goal.

Studies have also been published that demonstrate that dolphins understand some numbers concepts and other research that explores maternal use of signature whistles. The center has also published a study that shows that dolphins in human care in the U.S. live as long or longer than dolphins in the wild. The center has also collaborated with Duke University researchers on dolphins' energy expenditures.

== Education ==
Dolphin Research Center operates the Dolphin Research Center Training Institute (DRCTI)

DRCTI also offers a Professional Animal Trainer program to provide more experience and continuing education to trainers of all animal species.

== Issues and controversy ==
After Hurricane Andrew struck the Florida Keys in 1992, the DRC dolphin "Annessa" escaped or was washed out of her sea pen. Opponents of dolphin captivity including Ric O'Barry allege that Annessa is an example of a captive-born dolphin successfully transitioning from captivity to wild life, which could be an argument for releasing such dolphins back into the wild. However, the DRC disputes that Annessa was able to transition to life back in the wild. They state that there was one credible sighting of her immediately after the storm, verified via photograph. Of the photograph, Mandy Rodriguez stated, "it was clear that Annessa had already lost a considerable amount of weight and was not sustaining herself in the wild. Unfortunately, Annessa was never seen again and there is no evidence to suggest that she survived long term."
