= San Antonio Aquarium =

Coordinates: 29.48721°N 98.60964°W

- Interactive map of San Antonio Aquarium
- Location: 6320 Bandera Road; San Antonio, Texas
- Website: www.sanantonioaquarium.net

The San Antonio Aquarium is a for-profit aquarium located in San Antonio, Texas. The facility features a number of interactive exhibits where touching the animals was permitted. The aquarium is owned and operated by Crysty Covino, the wife of former owner Ammon Covino.

== Incidents and violations ==
On July 30, 2018, two robbers abducted a female grey horn shark named Miss Helen and transported her to their house. The thieves kept the shark alive and it was luckily rescued by San Antonio police officers and returned alive and well to the aquarium. Following the shark abduction, a public petition of more than 17,000 (61,000 as of January 2020) signatories requested the aquarium to close its touch pool containing a variety of aquatic animals. The petition cited the dangers of touch pools can have on the animals, namely due to the stress and potential injury inflicted by aquarium guests.

In October 2018, the United States Department of Agriculture cited the aquarium for the use of untrained lemurs due to the numerous instances of biting and scratching facility visitors.

In November 2018, the Leon Valley Fire Department shut down and evacuated the facility due to a number of safety hazards related to electrical and mechanical systems.

During the 2020 coronavirus pandemic, Leon Valley Police shut down the facility twice for violating emergency orders prohibiting groups of 10 or more.

In August 2025 an octopus latched on to a boy's arm and wouldn't let go. No staff were around to assist and the boy suffered severe bruises on his arm and back from the attack.

== See also ==
- Austin Aquarium
- SeaQuest Interactive Aquariums
