= Shreveport Aquarium =

Aquarium located in Shreveport, Louisiana, United States

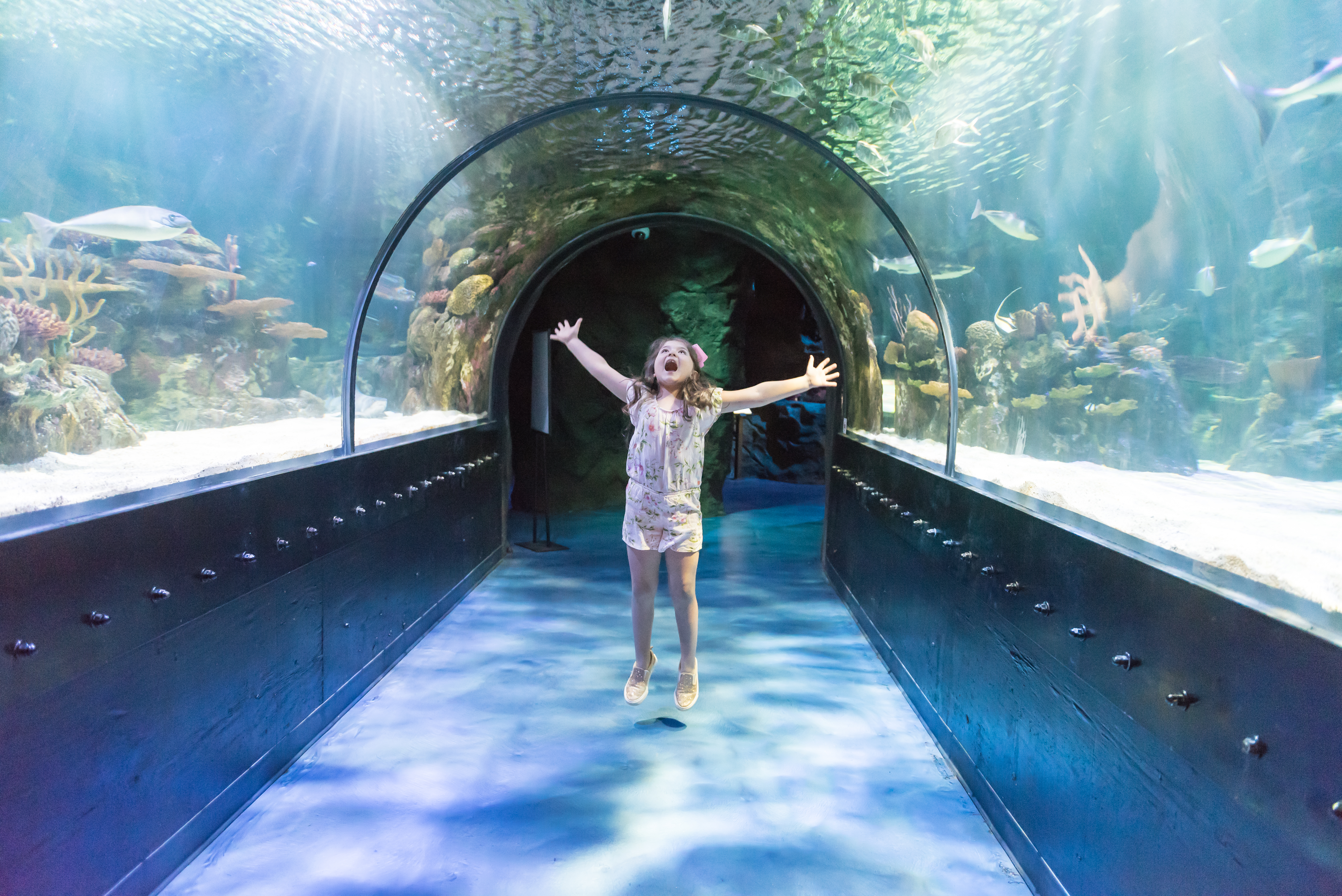
- Ocean Tunnel within the aquarium.
- Interactive map of Shreveport Aquarium
- 32°30′57″N 93°44′36″W
- Date opened: November 1, 2017
- Location: Shreveport, Louisiana, United States
- Floor space: 21,000 sq ft (2,000 m^{2})
- No. of animals: 3,000
- No. of species: 300
- Owner: Planet Aqua Group
- Website: www.shreveportaquarium.com

The Shreveport Aquarium is an aquarium located in Shreveport, Louisiana, United States.

The aquarium is adjacent to the Red River, near the Texas Street Bridge. It holds seven galleries that hold the 3,000 animals in its care, such as sharks, stingrays, eels, seahorses, alligators, paddlefish, snapping turtles and more. It is open all-year to the public, 7 days a week. Features stingray feedings by hand, touch tanks with rays, jellies, starfish, cleaner shrimp, sea cucumbers and more. Mine for gold, gems and fossils in the area's only indoor mining sluice. Other programs offered are summer camps, birthday parties, special holiday events along with private events and weddings.

The aquarium gained international attention in January 2025 after a shark pup named Yoko was born from an egg in a tank with two female sharks but no male ones. Scientists attributed the birth to a phenomenon of asexual reproduction called parthenogenesis, when an embryo develops from an egg without fertilization.

== Exhibits ==
The galleries are entered as visitors walk from the entrance to the exit.

- WOW Gallery - The first encountered gallery, which contains mainly reef fish like blue tangs, parrotfish, unicorn fish and angelfish
- Shipwreck gallery, exhibiting dedicated lionfish and more exhibits with clownfish, epaulette sharks, longnose hawkfish and many other species. In the Rainforest Way hall there is an axolotl, ball python and a poison dart frog exhibit.
- Dome on the Bayou - Themed around Caddo Lake, serving as the only freshwater themed gallery of the aquarium. In partnership with the Caddo Lake Institute, the gallery holds American paddlefish in efforts to keep the wild population stable, there are other animals like sliders, an Alligator snapping turtle, Largemouth bass, and alligators. Also nestled in the dome amongst the wildlife is Louisiana's only indoor mine sluice. Patrons can purchase mine rough to run through the sluice to uncover gems and fossils.
- Shore Explore - Themed as a tide pool from the Oregon Coast, visitors can touch kelp crabs, bat stars, green anemone, purple sea urchins and many other creatures.
- Cave gallery - Holds flashlight fish, moray eels and octopus.
- Ocean Tunnel - 30,000 gallon largest gallery of the aquarium. As visitors pass through an acrylic tunnel, they'll encounter more reef fish species, as well as gray reef sharks, whitetip sharks and a zebra shark.
- Contact Cove - Visitors can touch cownose rays, common stingrays, or get their hands cleaned by cleaner shrimp. The last gallery is the Submarine gallery, which has moon jellies to touch, as well as a seahorse and pipefish nursery, sea nettles, sheep crabs, wolf eels, horn sharks, swell sharks and much more to view through a pop-up dome. There is also a high resolution microscope set up to view a variety of specimens.

The aquarium is also home to a large indoor/outdoor event space overlooking the Red River and Texas Street Bridge, adjacent to Riverview Park.
