= Tarpon Springs Aquarium =

Aquarium in Florida

Tarpon Springs Aquarium and Animal Sanctuary
- Interactive map of Tarpon Springs Aquarium and Animal Sanctuary
- 28°10′N 82°46′W
- Date opened: 1990
- Location: Tarpon Springs, Florida; United States
- Major exhibits: Marine Life, Reptiles, and Zoo Animals
- Owner: Konger Family
- Website: www.tarponspringsaquarium.com

The Tarpon Springs Aquarium and Animal Sanctuary is a privately owned aquarium located in Tarpon Springs, Florida. The Konger family opened this business on the sponge docks in 1990. It has since passed hands through the family and is now owned and operated by Grant Konger and Paige Konger-Henry. The brother and sister duo have moved the aquarium to a new location where they are constantly expanding and building new exhibits for animal acquisitions and rescues. The new facility opened in 2021.

== Exhibits ==
There are several exhibits at the Tarpon Springs Aquarium and Animal Sanctuary including Marine Life, Reptiles, and Zoo Animals.

The Marine Life Exhibits include but are not limited to; Stingrays, Game Fish, Tropical Fish, Sharks, Snails, Crabs, Horseshoe Crabs, Lobsters, Terrapins, Turtles, Urchins, and Invertebrates.

The Reptile Exhibits include but are not limited to; Alligators, Crocodiles, Iguanas, Non-Venomous Snakes, Venomous Snakes, Turtles, Tortoises, Bearded Dragons, Leopard Geckos, Chameleons, Chinese-Water Dragons, Asian Water Monitors, Basilisk Lizards.

The Mammal Exhibits include but are not limited to; Goats, Pigs, Chickens, Ducks, Birds Horses, and Bunnies.
