= Aquarium of Boise =

Non-profit aquarium in Boise, Idaho

- Interactive map of Aquarium of Boise
- 43.60541°N 116.27333°W
- Date opened: December 16, 2011
- Location: Boise, Idaho, United States
- No. of animals: 5000
- No. of species: 300
- Volume of largest tank: 17,000 gallon
- Annual visitors: 180,000
- Major exhibits: 32
- Website: www.aquariumboise.net

The Aquarium of Boise is a 501 c(3) non-profit aquarium in Boise, Idaho, United States. It opened to the public in 2011.

== History ==
The aquarium was built in a remodeled 10,000-square-foot (930 m^{2}) warehouse in Boise and opened to the public on December 16, 2011.

On February 21, 2013 in the United States District Court, Southern District of Florida, Ammon Covino, the president and owner of the aquarium, Christopher Conk, its secretary, and the aquarium itself as a corporate entity were accused of buying $6,300 worth of protected fish in violation of Florida law and the federal Lacey Act, namely four Spotted eagle rays and two Lemon sharks. (In a separate case, Conk had pleaded guilty in 2011 to shipping live coral globally, and hence was under supervised probation.) The aquarium was closed for that day, guarded by agents of the Idaho Department of Fish and Game and the U.S. Fish and Wildlife Service, but reopened the next day with new protocols in place to ensure that, according to staff biologist Stephanie Leonard, that "...our suppliers have all their proper permits in place." She also noted that " If anything, it's been an educational opportunity for us, a learning experience."

On May 21, 2014, the "Idaho Aquarium" officially changed its name to the "Aquarium of Boise". This was a part of a larger restructuring process that included a new board of directors, CEO and COO, with the mission to maintain and strengthen the organization as a vital educational part of the community.

== Features ==
The Aquarium of Boise is designed primarily around interactive touch tanks. Its main exhibits feature a shark nursery, coral reef habitat, shark and stingray pool, a jellyfish tank, and tide pools. The interactive exhibits include opportunities for visitors to touch or hold animals such as coral, starfish, crabs, sharks and rays. The aquarium also exhibits terrestrial and arboreal animals, such as lories, tree frogs and chameleons.
