= Li hing mui =

Salty dried Chinese plum

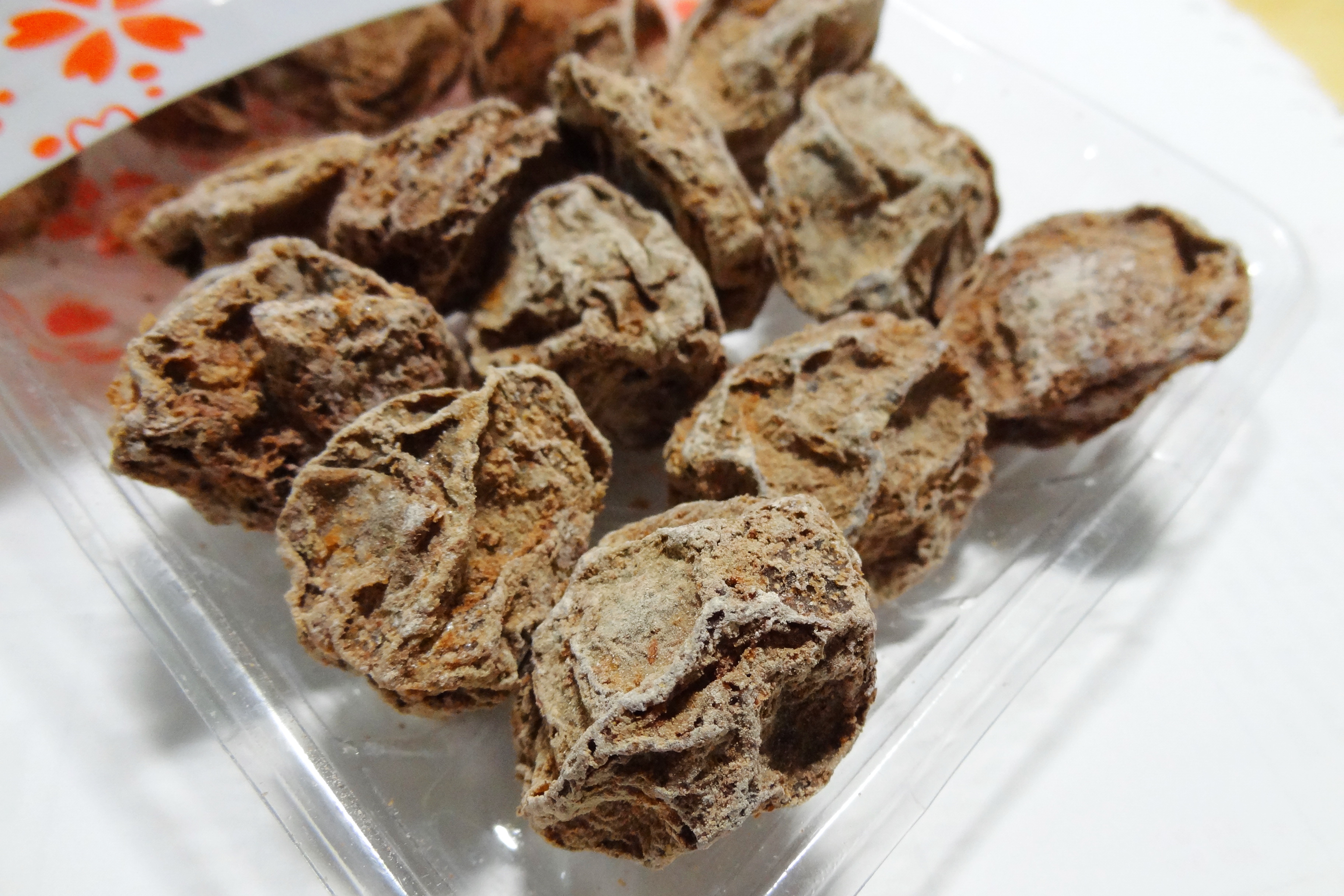
Li hing mui

Li hing mui (Chinese: 旅行梅; Pe̍h-ōe-jī: lí-hêng muî; Jyutping: leoi^{5} hang^{4} mui^{4}), known as huamei (simplified Chinese: 话梅; traditional Chinese: 話梅; pinyin: Huà méi) in mainland China, is salty dried Chinese plum (Prunus mume). It has a strong, distinctive flavor and is often said to be an acquired taste, as it has a combination of sweet, sour, and salty taste. Originally from Guangdong Province, the name "li hing mui" means "traveling plum". "Li hing" is "traveling" and "mui" is "plum" in Cantonese. Li hing mui is called hoshiume (Japanese: 干し梅, dried plum) in Japan, where the salty and sour umeboshi is also popular. Li hing mui, along with li hing powder, is extremely popular as a snack in Hawaii.

== Powder ==
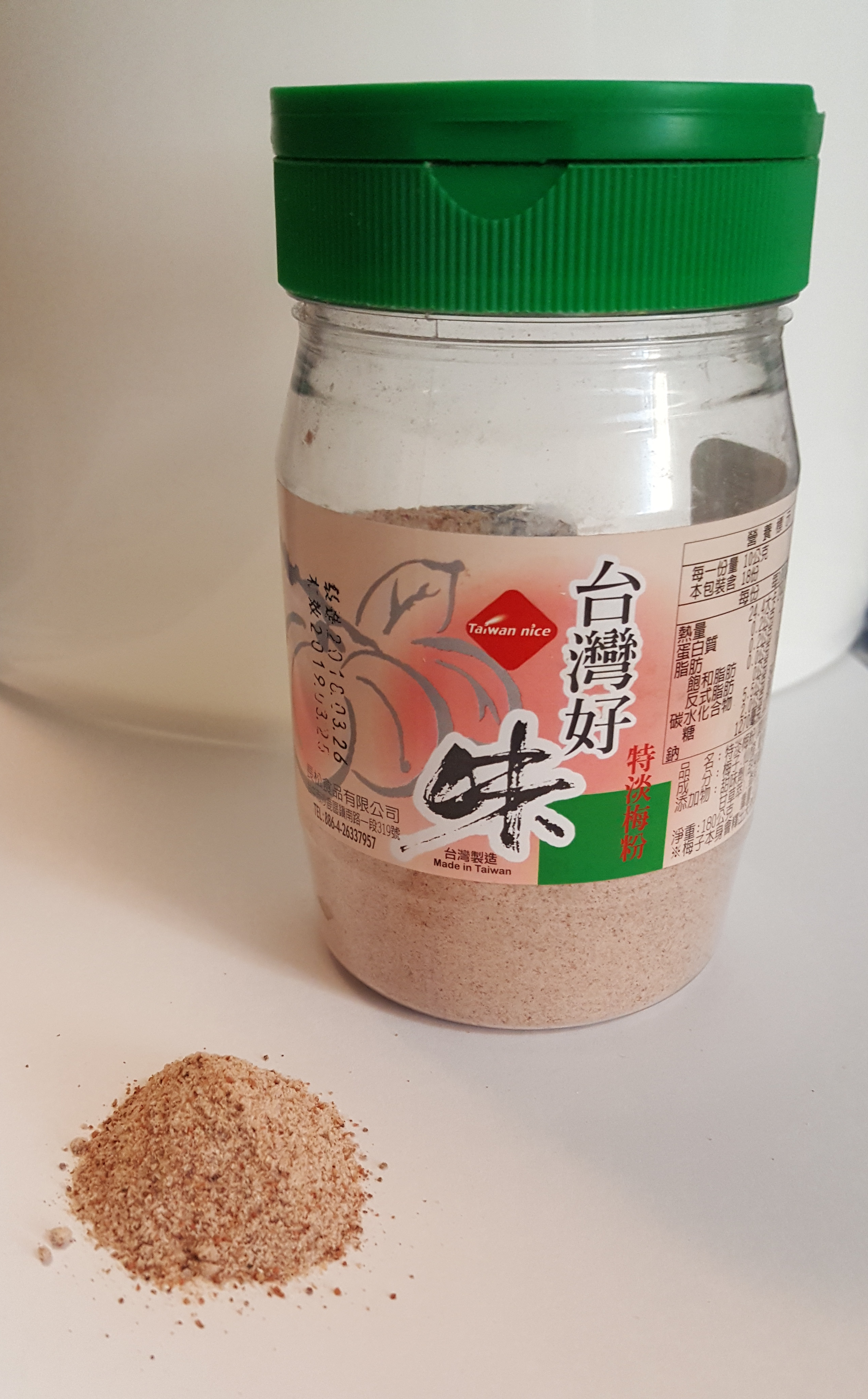
Li hing mui powder from Taiwan.

Li hing mui powder is made of ground plum skin that has previously been pickled in a combination of licorice, red food coloring, salt, sugar, and occasionally aspartame and or saccharine. It can be used as a flavoring, usually sprinkled on candy and other fruits, notably pineapples, mangoes, guavas, bananas and apples. Li hing mui powder can be found in Hawaii, it is used on shave ice, sour candy, rock candy, popcorn, fruit, and arare.

== Alcoholic beverages ==
Li hing powder is also added to alcoholic drinks—mainly tequila and cocktails. Many bars in Hawaii replace salt with li hing powder. Because its flavor is not only salty but also sweet and sour, li hing adds a tart and tangy twist. The powder may also be used to coat the rim of the cocktail glass.

Besides li hing powder, the whole li hing mui (red plum seed) is added directly to a bottle of tequila, filling the bottle at least half way with the li hung moi plum seeds. After a few weeks, the li hing plums will impart its reddish color and flavor to the tequila, fully transferring their flavor to the drink.

Note that li hing powder is used on different plum varieties, and it comes in different colors. The "red" powder is popular on fruits and assorted red plum varieties. A "white" powder version is more commonly used on dried/dehydrated plums.

In China, huamei are often found in bottles of rice wine, like olives in a martini.

== Variations in other countries ==
=== East Asia ===
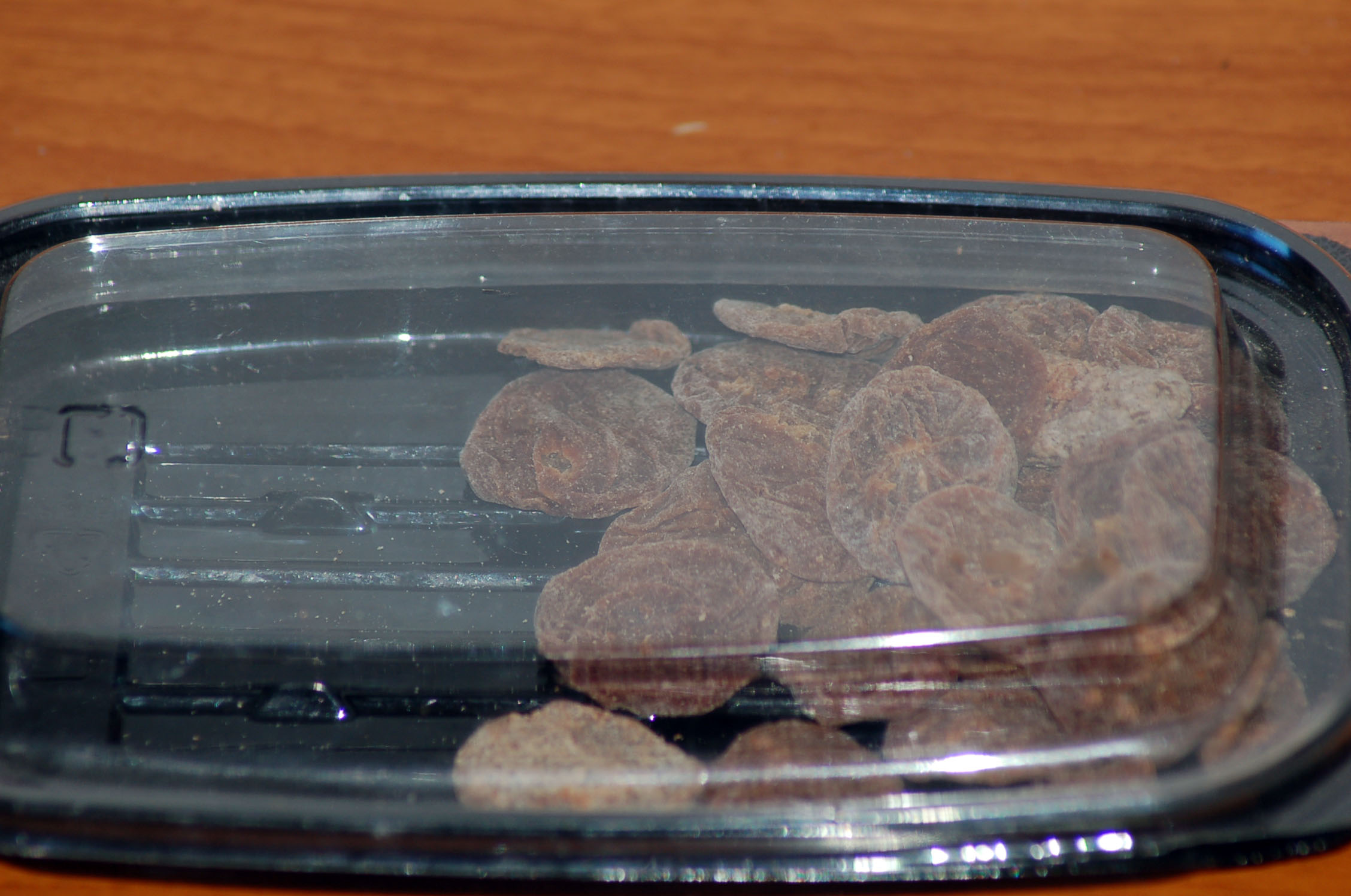
Hoshiume, Japanese-style sweet and sour dried Chinese plum

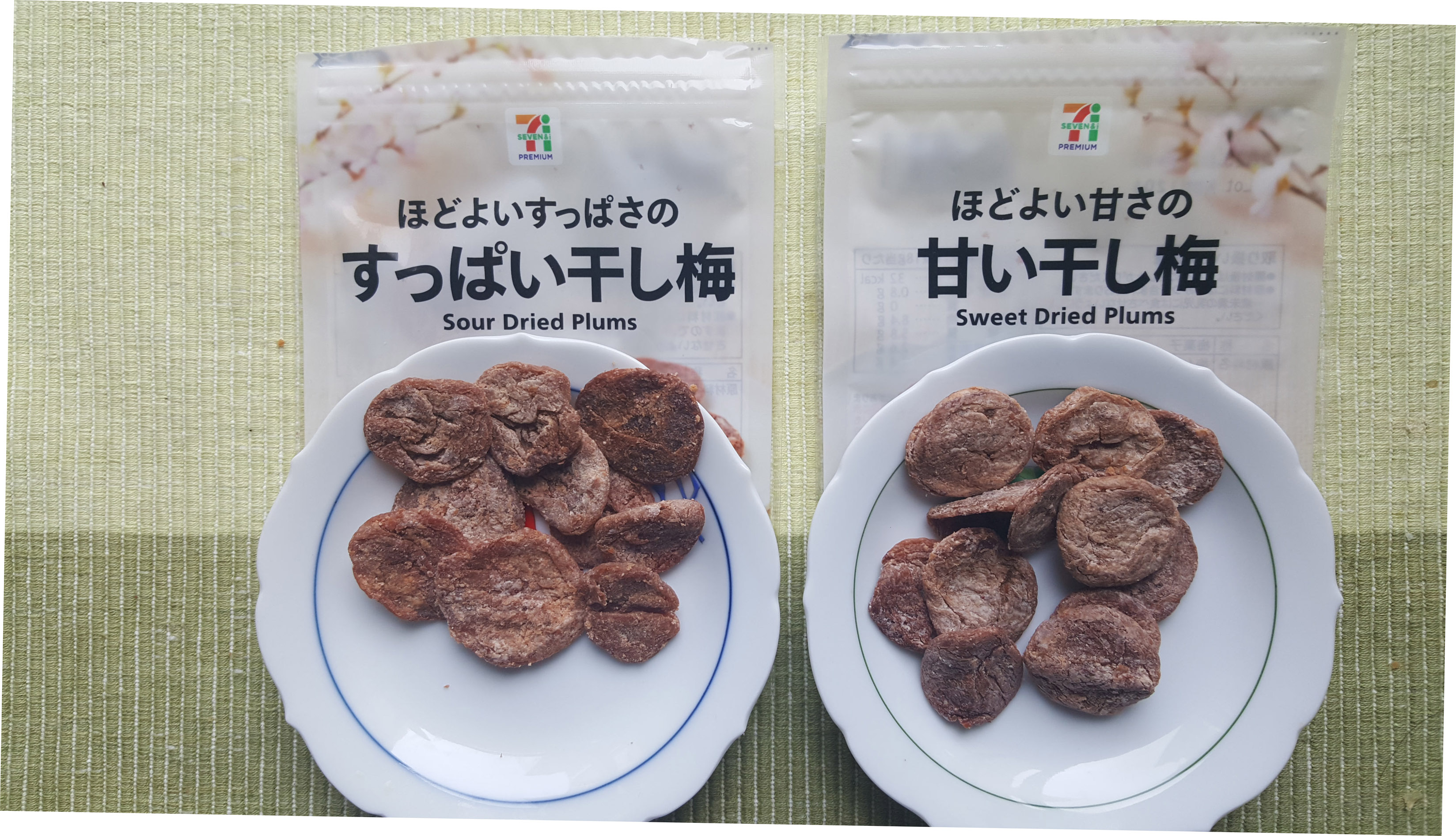
Japanese-style dried Chinese plums, comfortably sour (left) and sweet (right)

Li hung mui is also usually found in Korea and Japan.

In addition, Li hung mui was introduced to Japan from China through Okinawa, and was simply called Hoshiume (干し梅, dried plum). Its import, however, was stopped soon, as cyclamate was found being used. As the dried plum using candyleaf was developed in 1981 by such confectionaries as Uema Confectionary in Okinawa, it has become popular among the Japanese. It is now found in the local supermarkets in Japan.

=== Malaysia ===
In Malaysia, li hing mui is known as asam boi (lit. 'plum preserve'), while the powdered form is serbuk asam (lit. 'sour powder').

=== Nepal ===
In Nepal, Chinese style dried plums are known locally as khattu (खट्टु), where they are often contrasted with Nepalese style dried plums called bechi (बेची) which are made from Nepalese hog plums. Both are commonly found sold in titaura shops, which is the term for Nepalese sour fruit candy. \

=== Philippines ===
Li hing mui were introduced to the Philippines during the Spanish colonial period by Chinese Filipino immigrants. They are known in Filipino as kiamoy (spelled ciamoy in Philippine Spanish). The name is derived from Philippine Hokkien Chinese: 鹹梅; Pe̍h-ōe-jī: kiâm-muî; lit. 'salted plum'. The li hing mui powder mixture (anise, licorice, salt, sugar, and powdered plum seeds) was also introduced and is sold separately as kiam-muy-hoon (or simply "kiamoy powder", Hokkien Chinese: 鹹梅粉; Pe̍h-ōe-jī: kiâm-muî hún; lit. 'salted plum powder'). The powder is used as an ingredient in cooking, as coating for the dish kiamoy chicken, or as dips for fruits like pomelo and unripe or pickled mango. A locally developed variant of kiamoy is known as champóy which uses the native berry Myrica rubra (also locally known as champóy).

=== Polynesia and the Pacific ===
Li hing mui was introduced to the Polynesian islands of Hawaii, Tahiti and Samoa in the late 19th century by Chinese labourers working in the plantations. It is typically eaten in powdered form, sprinkled over fruits such as mango or ambarella and other desserts. It is known locally as crack seed in Hawaii, Simoi in the Samoan islands and bonbon chinois in French Polynesia.

Li hing mui achieved popularity in Hawaii by Yee Sheong, who in early 1900 began importing li hing mui and various other preserved fruits, from China to Hawaii. Yee thus started the li hing mui craze, which flourished with the company he founded, Yick Lung. Li hing mui can be found in Hawaiian and Asian markets.

In Fiji, Li Hing Mui Powder is often referred to as mango skin powder. Despite not being made with actual mango skin, this name can be attributed to its similarities with popular mango skin Chinese lollies in both its color and taste.

=== North America ===
Li hing mui (as ciamoy) were introduced to Mexico by Filipino migrants via the Manila Galleons (1565 to 1815). These developed into the Mexican treat saladitos and the chamoy sauce derived from it.

== See also ==
- Umeboshi
- Chanh muối
- List of dried foods
