= Saladitos =

Dried salted plums

Saladitos are a Mexican snack of dried and salted plums or apricot, which can also be sweetened with sugar and anise or coated in chili and lime. A common misconception is that saladitos and chamoy are the same thing; saladitos are the dried salted fruit, whereas chamoy is made from the leftover brine.

== History ==
Saladitos and chamoy are derived from the kiamoy ("ciamoy" in Philippine Spanish) and champóy of the Philippines, which themselves originated from li hing mui brought over by Hokkien migrants to the Philippines during the Spanish colonial period. They were likely transported to Nueva España by Filipino migrants via the Manila Galleons (1565 to 1815).

== Consumption ==
One method of eating saladitos is to stuff a few of them into an orange or lemon and then suck the salted juice out, while allowing the saladito to rehydrate. Once all the juice is eaten, the saladitos are eaten. The pits can be cracked open to eat the seed, too. Another method is to eat the saladito without any other fruit, and either crack open the pit to eat the seed or discard the pit. One can also first rinse the saladito with water and then eat it plain.

On some occasions, a few saladitos may be put into drinks like micheladas, Sprite, ginger ale or beer. Once the saladito is placed in the soda, bubbles will begin to rise immediately. There is also a mezcal cocktail that shares the name saladito.

== Recalls ==
A recall notice was issued in the United States in 2009 by the Texas Department of State Health Services, when saladitos believed to have been sourced from Asia were found to have levels of lead exceeding health guidelines. In 2021–2022, the California Department of Public Health issued a recall warning on eight brands of saladitos manufactured in China and Taiwan, also found to have levels of lead exceeding health guidelines.

== See also ==
- Crack seed
- Chanh muối
- Umeboshi
- List of dried foods
