= Crack seed =

Category of snacks that originated in China

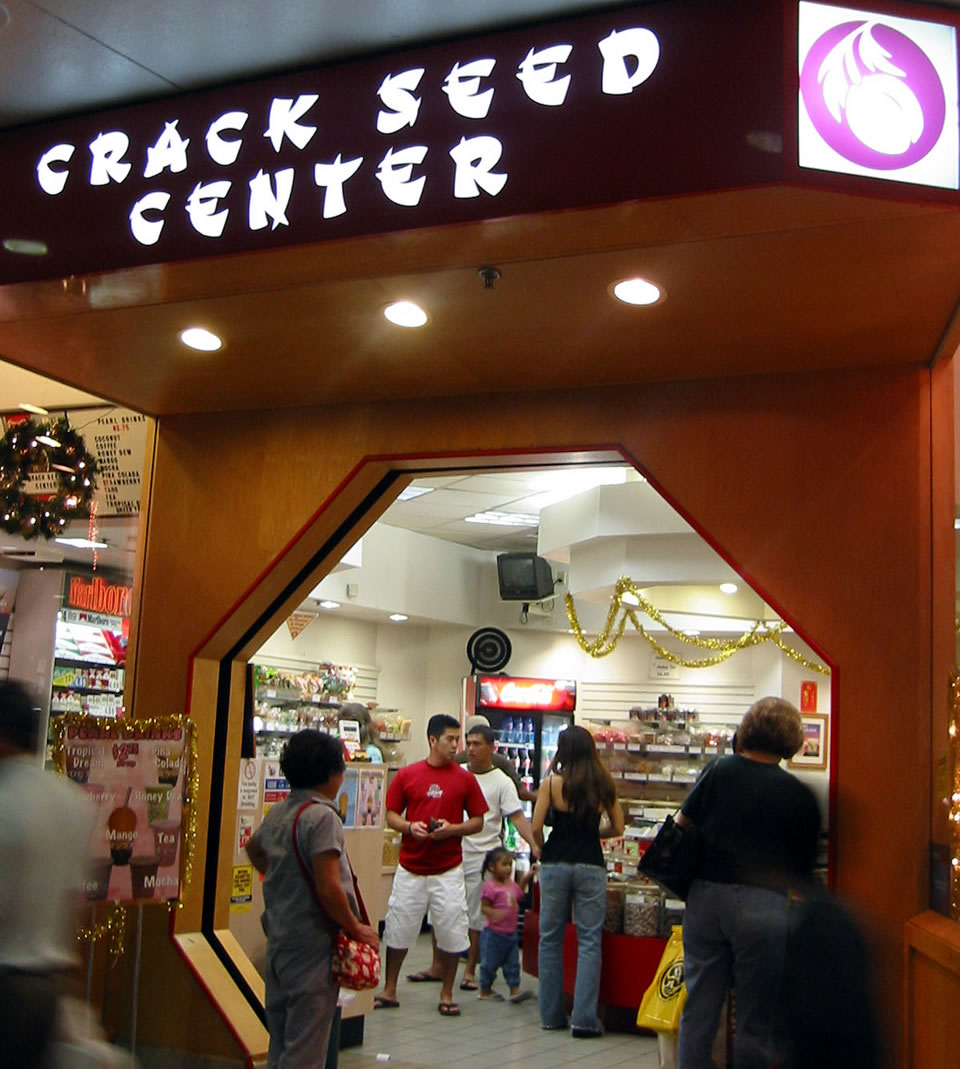
Crack Seed Center at Ala Moana Center in Honolulu, Hawaii

Crack seed is a category of snacks that originated in China. It is highly popular in many regions, such as Hawaii. Crack seed are preserved fruits that have been cracked or split with the seed or kernel partially exposed as a flavor enhancement. The term crack seed has come to encompass a wide variety of preserved fruit (typically mangoes, plums, peaches, apricots, cherry, papaya, etc.) through different means such as pickling, drying, sugaring, etc. This type of snack is commonly referred to in the Cantonese language as see mui (西梅; [siː muːi]) (or see moi in Hawaii); it arrived in Hawaii during the 19th century, when Cantonese immigrants were brought to work on the plantations. The larger numbers of Japanese who later came to work on the plantations adopted the snack, being similar to the Japanese umeboshi.

The flavors are varied, ranging from extremely sweet and salty to sour flavors. Flavors can include rock salt plum, honey mango, licorice peach, or any kind of combination of fruits, flavors and type of preservatives used. What originally was a preserved fruit has become a favorite snack in Hawaii and a sample of a cultural food.

Crack seed stores also sell candies such as gummi bears, and Sour Patch Kids, coated with Li Hing Mui powder. There is currently only one crack seed manufacturer (Jade Food Products) in the USA, producing a wide variety of fresh crack seed made in Hawaii since 1961.

Some types of crack seed found in Hawaii and Asia are dry and chewy types of li hing mui, dried persimmons, preserved mandarin peels, and salted Chinese and Thai olives, also known as nam liap in Thai.

== See also ==
- Kiamoy and Champóy (Philippines)
- Chamoy (Mexico)
- Chanh muối (Vietnam)
- Umeboshi (Japan)
- Saladitos (Mexico)
- Prunus mume
