= Hawaiian shave ice =

Ice-based dessert

Shave ice
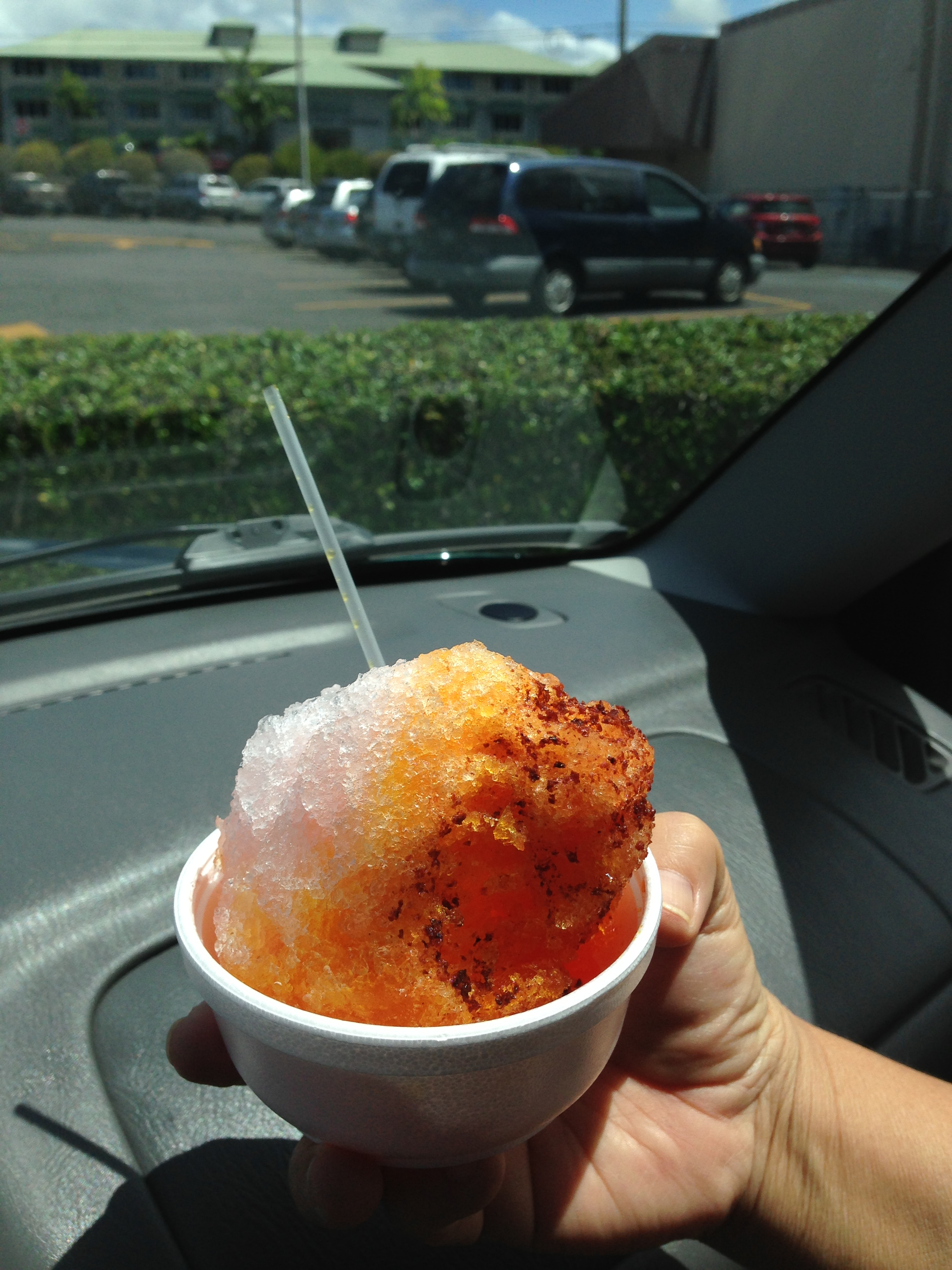
- Li Hing Mui and Lychee ice shaved from crack seed shop in Hilo, Hawaii
- Alternative names: Shaved ice, shave ice, snoBalls, shavers, and Hawaiian shaved ice.
- Type: Frozen dessert
- Course: Dessert
- Place of origin: Japan
- Region or state: Hawaii
- Serving temperature: 18 to 20 °F (−7 °C).
- Main ingredients: Ice, syrup

Shave ice (Hawaiian: haukōhi lit. "split/chipped ice") or Hawaiian shave ice is an ice-based dessert made by shaving a block of ice and flavoring it with syrup and other sweet ingredients. On Hawai‘i Island, it is also called "ice shave".

In contrast, a snow cone, a similar American dessert, is made with crushed ice rather than shaved ice. The thin ice shavings of shave ice allow for the flavored syrups to be absorbed completely instead of sinking to the bottom. Hawaiian shave ice is derived from a similar ice-based dessert from Japan called kakigōri and thus involves similar production methods.

Shave ice is characteristically served in a paper cone or plastic cup with flavored syrups poured over the top with additional elements like ice cream, azuki beans, or condensed milk. Shave ice syrups in Hawaii are often flavored with local ingredients such as guava, pineapple, coconut cream, passionfruit, li hing mui (Chinese plums), lychee, kiwifruit, and mango.

== History ==
=== Japan ===
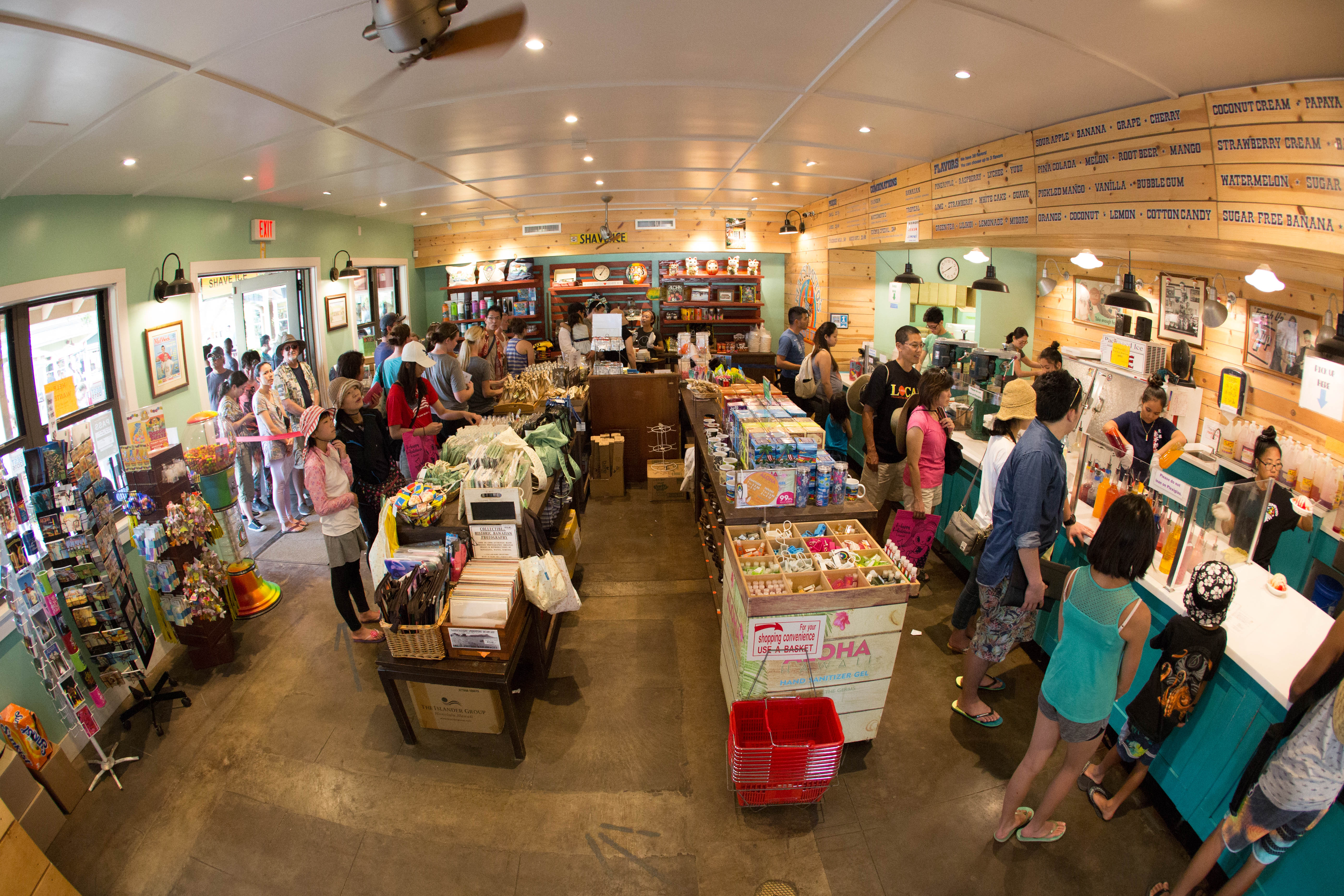
Matsumoto Shave Ice, a well-known shave ice destination in Oahu.

The history of Hawaiian shave ice can be traced back to one particular ice-based dessert that originates from Japan's Heian period, which spanned the 8th through 12th centuries CE. This dessert is known as kakigōri and was once reserved for the wealthy because of the complex production process of ice, which was only accessible in the winter and refrigeration relied on natural sources like ice houses.

During the early 1900s of the Meiji period, the development of new technologies allowed ice to be cheaply made and stored, allowing for greater consumption among various types of people. Around the same time, sugar plantations prolifically developed across Hawaii, and many people from Asian countries relocated to the Hawaii islands in hopes of earning a steady income. The Japanese were among this immigrant population and brought with them their traditional ice-based dessert called kakigōri.

=== Hawaii ===
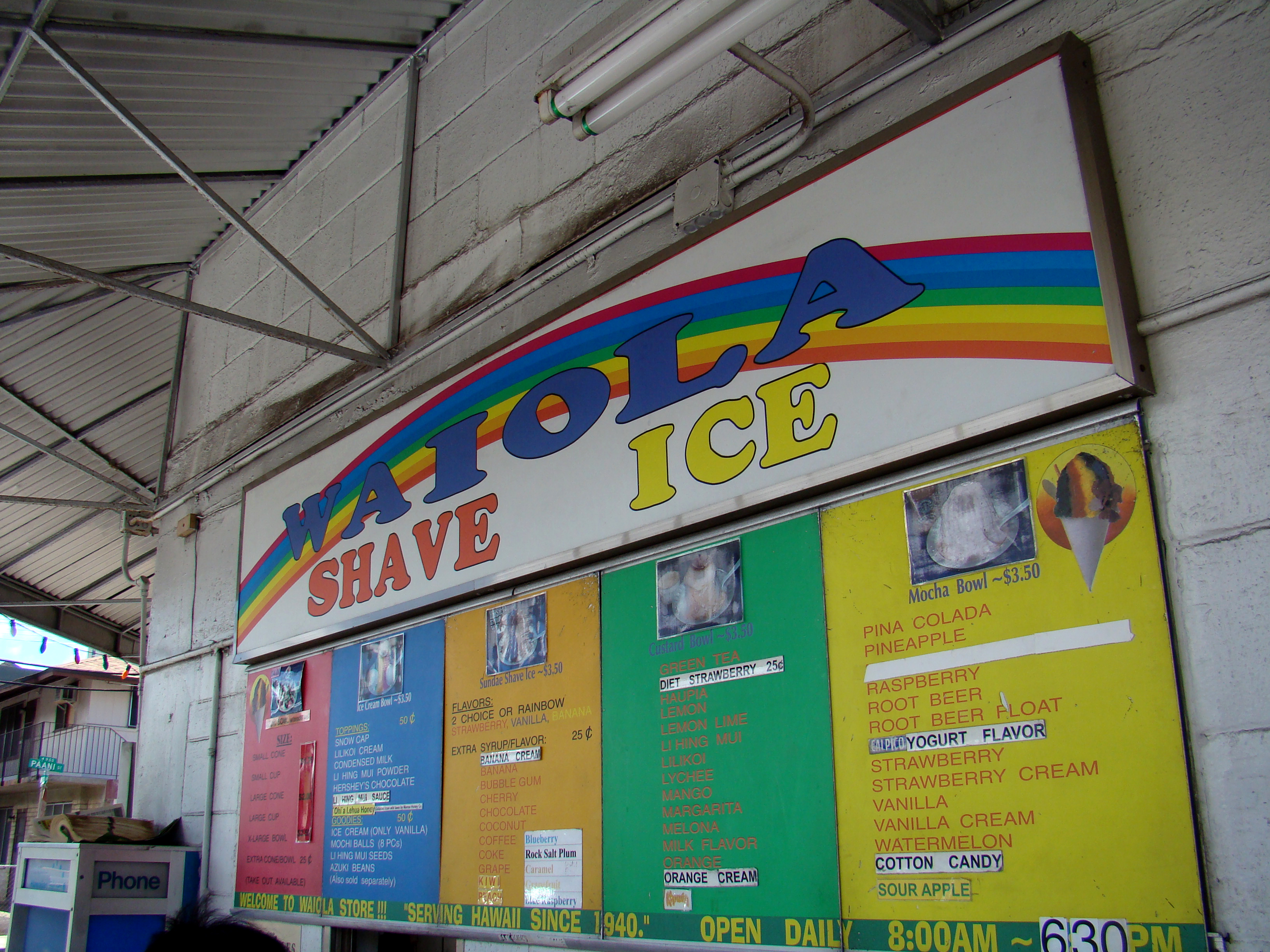
Waiola Shave Ice, one of Hawaii's oldest shave ice shops, was founded in 1940.

In Hawaiian Pidgin, a native Hawaiian language, kakigōri became known as shave ice. Shave ice was first sold by Japanese immigrants to plantation workers in the early 1900s and became a regular product in many Japanese owned grocery stores by the 1950s. The rise of shave ice coincided with the increasing significance of ice in Hawaiian history as shown in trade agreements between the United States and the Territory of Hawaii where numerous references are made to this important commodity. Because ice (hau) signified status and provided comfort to settlers on the island, it was an essential factor in the U.S. colonization of Hawaii.

Hawaiian shave ice sales began to rise in the 1950s and 1960s with the arrival of Californian surfers. By the 1990s, shave ice stores, such as Oahu's Matsumoto Shave Ice and Waiola Shave Ice stores, garnered the attention of international visitors. Matsumoto's has been featured in news networks all around the world including Food Network and the Travel Channel. It can have wait times of over half an hour, and sell more than 1,000 shave ice treats a day and 326,400 shave ices in a year. While shave ice originated in Japan and gained popularity in Hawaii, it has spread to other parts of the world. In Europe, especially in Berlin, shave ice gained popularity due to features in newspapers. In 2023, it was also featured on the German TV channel ZDF at ZDF Fernsehgarten.

== Components ==
=== Ingredients ===
Many variations of shave ice can also be found in Hawaii. Shave ice in its simplest form is composed of thinly shaved ice and syrup served in a cup, paper cone, or bowl. Distinct from snow cones that use crushed ice, the ice for Hawaiian shave ice is thinly shaved to create a unique texture that is more powdery and snow-like. Additionally, the thin ice shavings can absorb syrups better than crushed ice. The ice can be made in house by freezing pure water in containers very slowly over a period of days, while constantly agitating the mixture to ensure impurities are not incorporated.

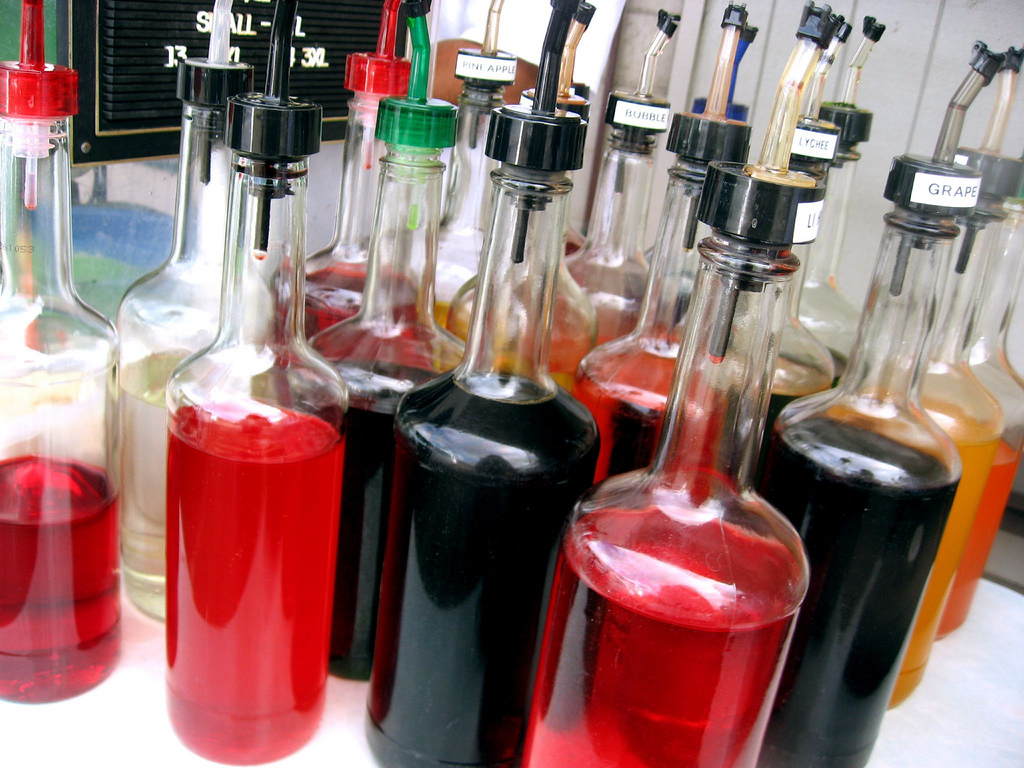
Syrups used for Hawaiian shave ice include banana, pineapple, lychee, kiwifruit, mango, passionfruit, guava, and coconut.

Traditional syrups are made from sugar, flavoring extracts, and additional coloring elements with acid incorporated to enhance preservation. Syrups are often flavored with local ingredients such as banana, pineapple, lilikoi (passionfruit), guava, lychee, kiwifruit, mango, and coconut cream, and are found in other regions around the world, such as in bingsu (Korean), tshuah-ping (Taiwanese), and halo-halo (Filipino) shave ice variants. Bubble gum, vanilla, lemon-lime, green tea, strawberry, cherry, grape, watermelon, coke, root beer, and fruit punch have also been incorporated into syrups for shave ice. New syrup flavors are constantly being developed including more unusual ones such as li hing mui (salty dried Chinese plums), melona, ginger, and pickled mango. These syrups are often quite vibrant with certain colors traditionally representing specific flavors, such as blue for coconut. These color-flavor associations enable customers to order syrups by color instead of using their flavors for reference. When many different colors of syrups are combined, it is referred to as kalakoa (means 'calico' in Hawaiian).

=== Additional elements ===
Additional ingredients that lie underneath the ice flakes are often called "unders" and must be added to the cup, cone, or bowl before shaving the ice on top. Traditional "unders" include sweetened red azuki beans, fresh fruits, and ice cream. Hawaiian shave ice is also often accompanied by toppings such as mochi balls, li hing mui (salty dried Chinese plums) powder, fresh fruits, and ice cream. A "snowcap" specifically refers to topping shave ice with sweetened condensed milk.

== Production ==
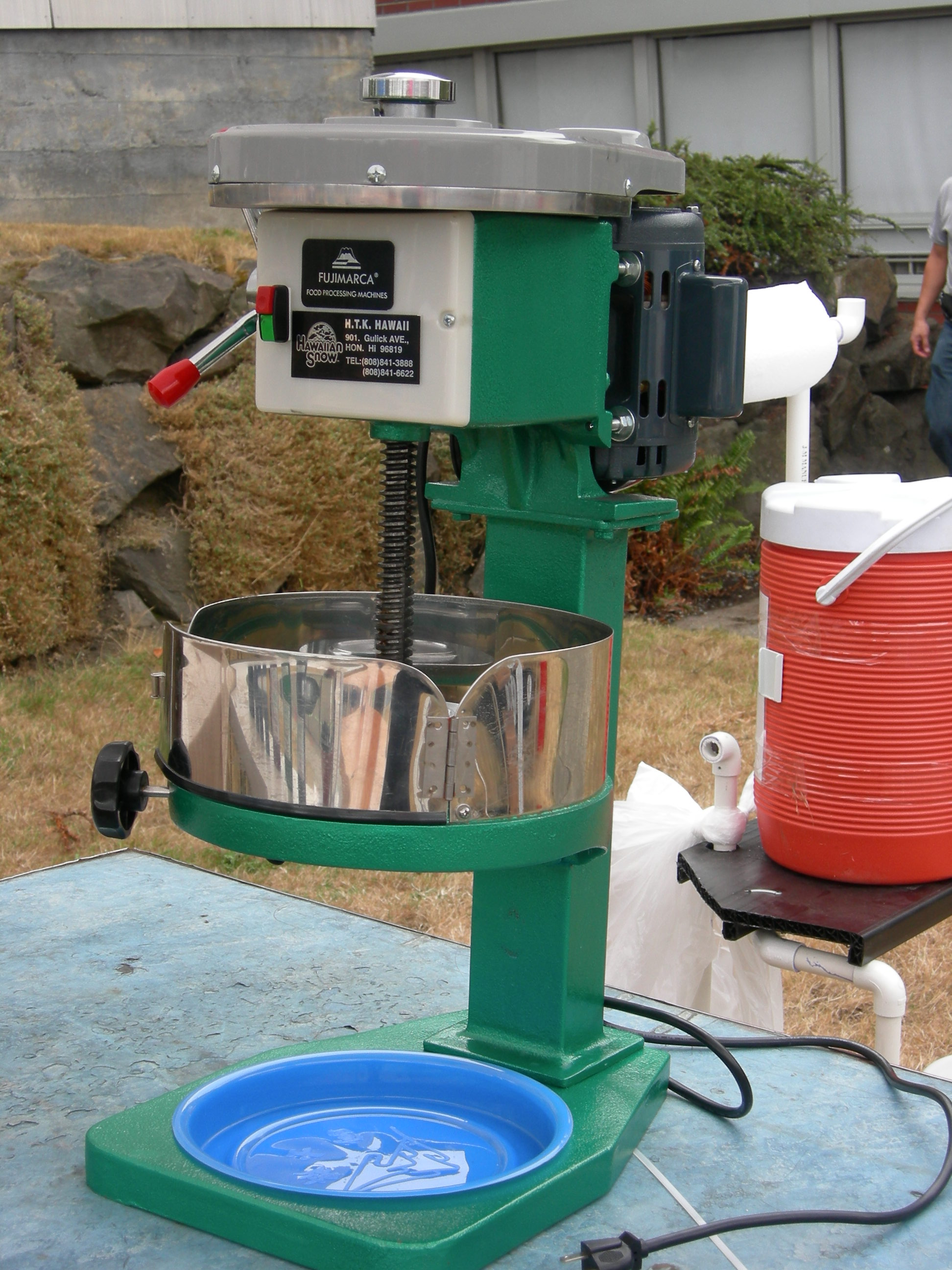
Hawaiian shave ice machine.

Traditionally, the ice flakes for shave ice are made with tools or machines that are operated manually. Sugar plantation workers would shave or chip flakes off large ice blocks with their own machetes (verb in Hawaiian: kōhi), on which they would then pour fruit juice. In modern times, while some still use hand-cranked machines, most shave ice stands use electric block shavers or cube ice shavers. Block shavers require a specific size of ice block that can be made by freezing water in specific molds. After the ice block is taken out of the freezer, it needs to be tempered by leaving it out at room temperature for roughly 15 minutes so it begins to melt slightly. This ensures that the ice flakes are firm enough to hold the syrup but also soft enough to eat with a spoon.

A container (cup, paper cone, or bowl) should be placed under the shaving machine to collect the ice flakes, and "unders" (ingredients for the bottom such as ice cream and azuki beans) should be added before shaving. The ice block will then be carefully inserted into the shave ice machine on top of sharp blades. For some machine models, blades should be adjusted to avoid chunky ice flakes that are used in snow cones and preserve the fluffy texture of true shaved ice. The machine can be activated either by button or foot pedal. While the machine runs, the operator rotates the container and shapes the ice flakes with one hand to get the intended size and consistency. Once the ice flakes are ready, different kinds of syrup (artificially or naturally flavored) will be added on the surface. Some shave ice stands also punch holes with hard sticks in the ice so that the syrup can reach the bottom. Finally, toppings such as condensed milk and fruit are added for more flavor.

== Varieties ==
Many global variants of ice-based desserts that are similar to Hawaiian shave ice can be found in a number of different countries.

=== Ice cake ===
Ice cake was popular in the past on Hawaiian sugar plantation camps. Unlike shave ice, the ice for ice cake is served directly out of the freezer. The ice cubes for this treat consist of a mixture of condensed milk, syrup, and water and are frozen in aluminium ice cube trays.

== See also ==
- Ais kacang (ABC): Malaysian shaved ice
- Es campur: Indonesian shaved ice
- Namkhaeng sai and O-aew: Thai shaved ices
- Shaved ice
- Tasaka Guri-Guri: Hawaiian sherbet creator and purveyor
