= Burong mangga =

Filipino side dish

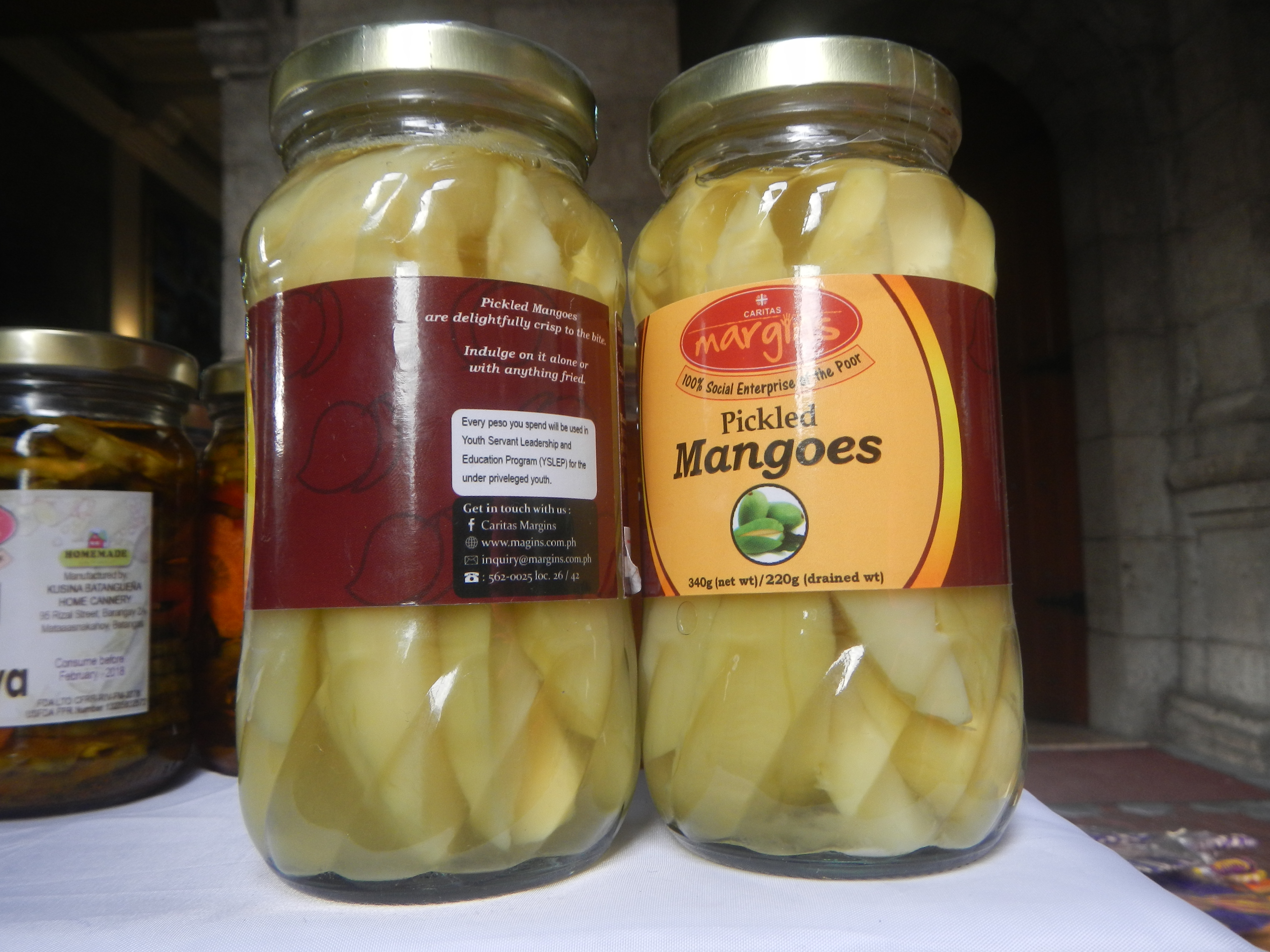
- Commercial burong mangga
- Alternative names: Pickled mango
- Course: Side dish
- Place of origin: Philippines

Burong mangga is a Filipino side dish and concoction made by mixing sugar, salt, and water with mangoes that have previously been salted. The mixture of water and sugar should be boiled and cooled first, before pouring it over the salted mangoes. Some variants add chilis to the cooled sugar water mixture. Original "basic" burong mangga is made using a brine solution and pouring it over halved unripe or partially ripe mangoes. Mango cultivars commonly used for burong mangga include 'Carabao' mangoes and 'Pico' mangoes.

== See also ==
- Mangonada
- Mango pickle
- Kiamoy
- Chanh muối
- Pickled fruit
- Umeboshi
