= Dulces Miguelito =

Mexican confectionery company

Fábrica de Dulces Miguelito
- Industry: Food Industry
- Founded: 1971
- Headquarters: Mexico City, Mexico
- Key people: Francisco Valente González
- Products: candies

Dulces Miguelito is a Mexican candy company that makes products based on the chamoy pulp.

== History ==
In 1970 in Mexico City Valente Gonzáles Francisco was employed by a company dedicated to the production of fruit pulp. During a time of crisis, he was fired and given a manual machine and a refrigerator used for product packaging as sole compensation.

In 1971 he created the Chamoy Miguelito, chamoy pulp that he initially offered and distributed in stores and candy stores by bicycle. Through the years the product came to gain fame in the Mexican community.

Between 1973 and 1974 Francisco created Miguelito Chamoy Enchilado y de Sabores, which was greatly popular. These products were packed in a dust machine engineered by Francisco himself.

Between 1975 and 1980 saw the appearance of the new flavors Menta Paleta, Chabacano Rojo and Chabacano Seco as well as the first automated machines for their production. Since 1993 new products have been added such as Mickey pulp, Miguelín paleta and Chochiboy's, among others.
