= Kiamoy =

Snack made from dried pickled fruit and anise

- Alternative names: ciamoy, kiamuy, kiam muy
- Type: Sweets
- Place of origin: Philippines
- Main ingredients: fruits, salt, vinegar, sugar, anise powder
- Variations: champóy (tsampóy, sampóy, cham-poi); champóy na sampalok (sampalok candy)

Kiamoy (also spelled kiamuy or kiam muy, or in Philippine Spanish as ciamoy), is a class of Filipino treats made with dried sour plums, prunes, or apricots preserved in brine and vinegar. They are sold covered in a powdery coating of an anise (sometimes licorice), li hing (red powder made from plum seeds), salt, and sugar mixture called "kiamoy powder" or kiam-muy-hoon (Hokkien Chinese: 鹹梅粉; Pe̍h-ōe-jī: kiâm-muî hún; lit. 'salted plum powder'). They are characteristically bright red, orange, or light brown in color. They originate from Chinese Filipino immigrants and are derived from the li hing mui (Hokkien Chinese: 旅行梅; Pe̍h-ōe-jī: lí-hêng muî) treats of Chinese cuisine (also called huamei, 話梅). The name is derived from Philippine Hokkien Chinese: 鹹梅; Pe̍h-ōe-jī: kiâm-muî; lit. 'salted plum'.

A local variant of the kiamoy that evolved in the Bicol Region of the Philippines is champóy (also spelled tsampóy, sampóy, or cham-poi, names which can also apply to. It differs from kiamoy in that champóy is made from the locally available berry Myrica rubra (which is also known as "champóy"). Champóy is also dark red to black in color and has a predominantly sweet and tart flavor profile, in contrast to the saltier flavor profile of kiamoy. In modern times, the term "champóy" has also come to include the similar-tasting sampalok candy (sometimes differentiated as champóy na sampalok), which are sweets made from tamarind balls cooked in sugar and/or salt. Champoy is derived from Cantonese Chinese: 陳皮梅; Jyutping: can^{4} pei^{4} mui^{4-2}; Cantonese Yale: chàhn pèih múi; lit. 'dried peel plum', referring to chenpi (Mandarin Chinese: 陳皮; pinyin: chénpí).

Kiamoy are popular as street food usually sold near schools and are also commonly eaten as a remedy for car sickness. Kiamoy can also be infused into alcoholic drinks. Kiamoy powder is also sold separately as an ingredient, and can be used as a coating for kiamoy chicken or as a dip for fruits like pomelo, fresh green mango, or pickled green mango.

Kiamoy and champóy are believed to be the direct ancestors of the Mexican treat saladitos and the chamoy sauce derived from it. They were transported to Nueva España by Filipino migrants via the Manila Galleons (1565 to 1815).

== See also ==
- Chamoy
- Chanh muối
- Crack seed
- Pickled fruit
- Umeboshi
- Burong mangga
- Atchara
- List of pickled foods
