= Cholado =

Colombian iced drink

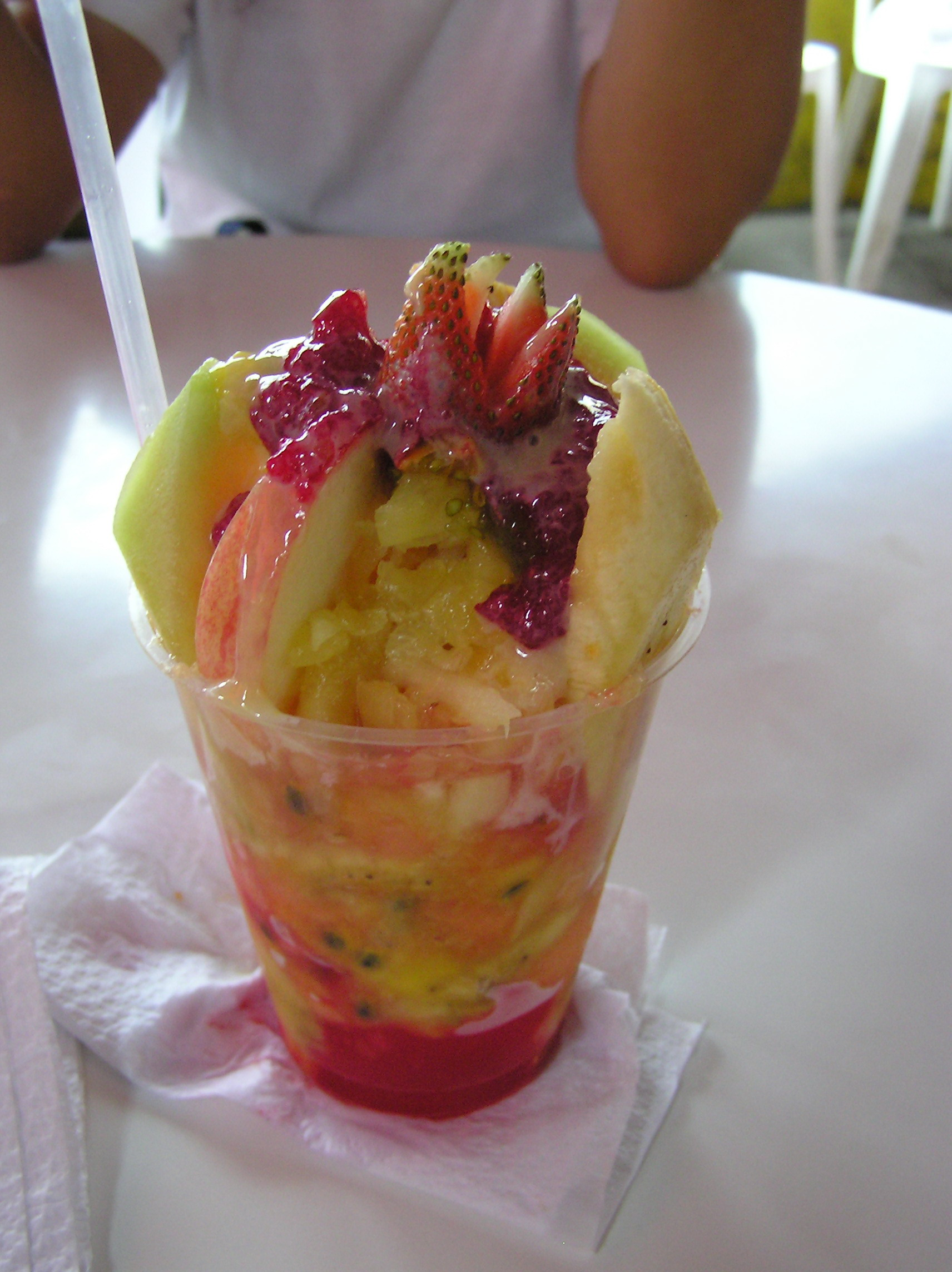
A cholado in Jamundí, Valle del Cauca, Colombia

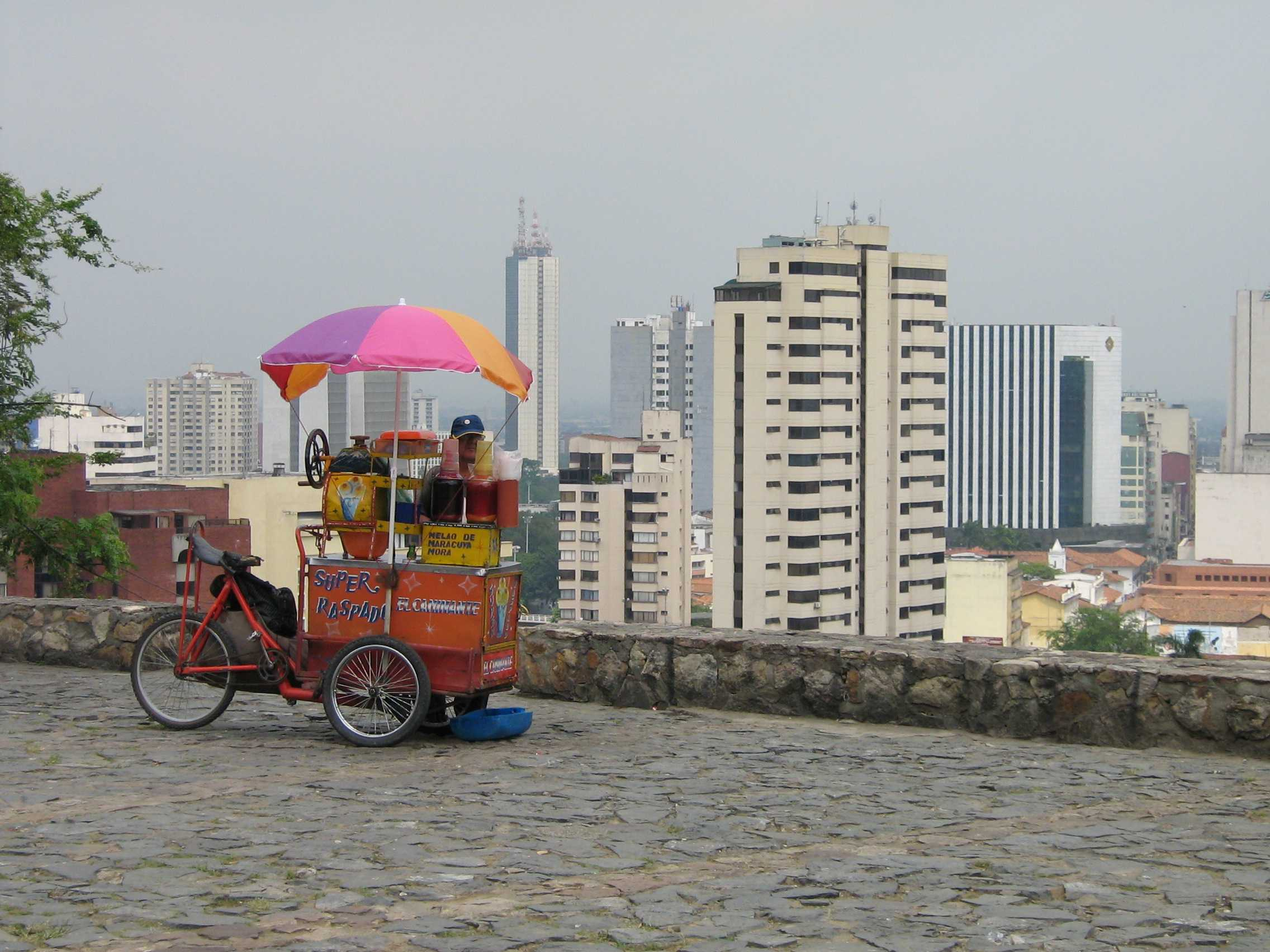
A raspado vendor in Cali, Valle del Cauca, Colombia

Cholado, raspao, or raspado is an icy beverage with fresh fruit and sweetened condensed milk traditionally from Jamundí, in the region of Valle del Cauca, Colombia. It is made from crushed ice or shaved ice, chopped fruit, condensed milk, fruit syrup, and served with a wafer cookie. It is sometimes topped with whipped cream. Fruits that are commonly used in cholado preparation include banana, apple, kiwifruit, strawberry, papaya, pineapple, mango, and soursop.

== See also ==
- Colombian cuisine
- Granizado
- Halo halo
- Chamoyada
