= Chamoyada =

Sweet and spicy Mexican shaved ice or sorbet drink

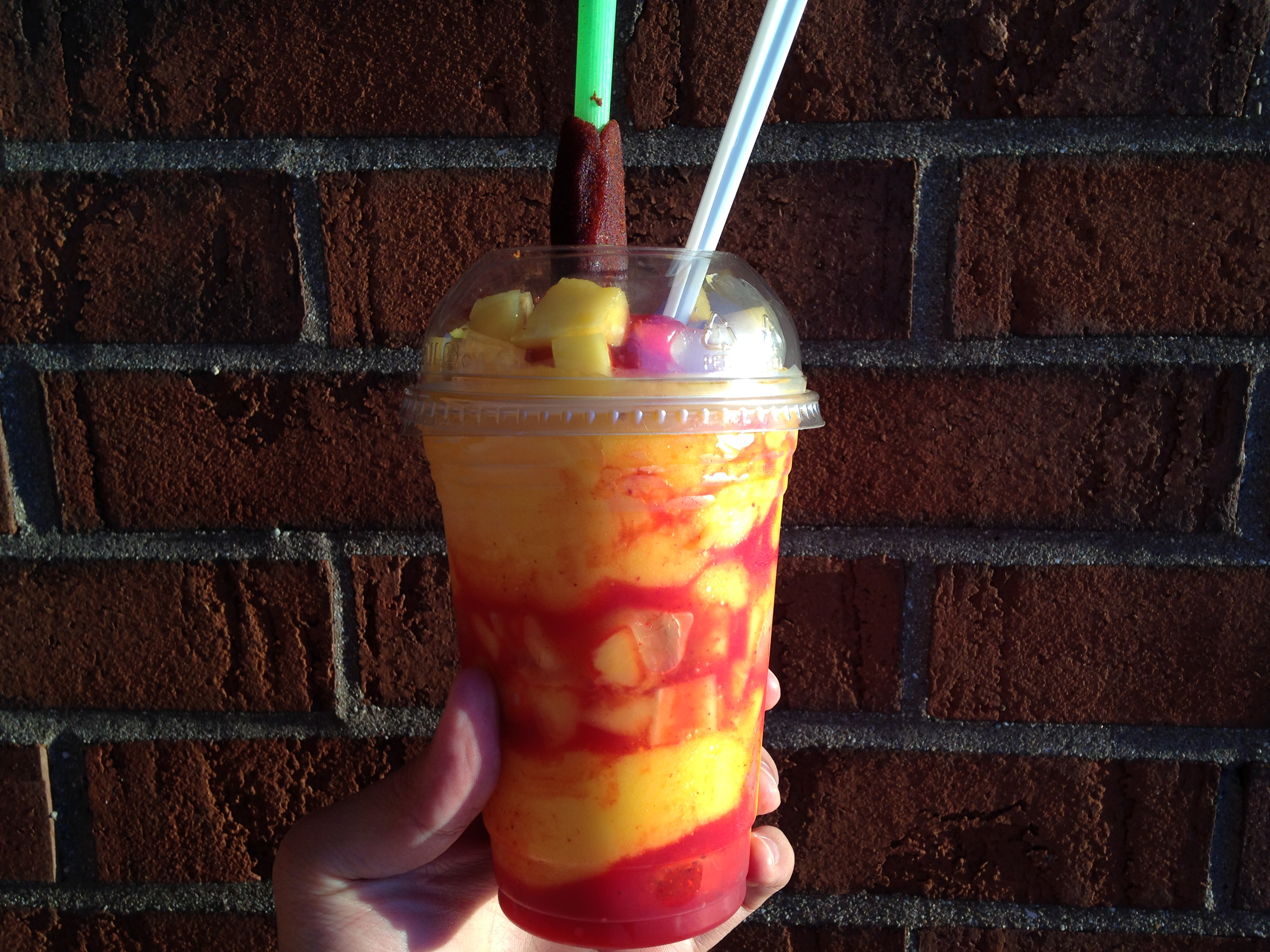
- Type: Mexican Drink
- Place of origin: Mexico
- Main ingredients: Mango, chamoy, lime juice and Tajín

Chamoyada is a sweet and spicy type of shaved ice, or raspado, drink prepared with fruit and flavored with chamoy. It is a part of Mexican cuisine, and is also common in regions of the United States with significant Mexican-American populations. The drink is most commonly prepared with mango sorbet or mango-flavored shaved ice, and thus is sometimes also called a mangonada or chamango. It may also be made with fresh mango or mango purée.

The drink is essentially a combination of chamoy sauce, shaved ice (or ice cream or sorbet, depending on the preparation), chili powder (such as Tajín), and fruit chunks. In certain variations, a whole fruit popsicle, or paleta, is added to the drink and mixed with the shaved ice. The drinking straws served with chamoyadas often have tamarind candy on the outside.

Different flavors of chamoyadas can include fruits like mango, lemon, guava, tamarind, pineapple, and strawberry.

== See also ==
- Burong mangga
- Cholado
- Halo-halo
