= Umezu =

Umezu is a Japanese word. It may refer to a surname, spelled 梅津 or 楳図, or it may have other meanings.

== People ==
- Hideyuki Umezu (1955–2024), Japanese actor and voice actor
- Kazuo Umezu (1936–2024), Japanese manga artist
- Kazutoki Umezu (born 1949), Japanese jazz saxophonist
- Yoshijirō Umezu (1882–1949), general in the Imperial Japanese Army in World War II

== Other ==
- Umezu (梅酢), the brine produced when preparing umeboshi; although the term translates as "plum vinegar", it is a misnomer.

== See also ==
- He-Umezu Agreement (梅津・何応欽協定), a secret agreement between the Empire of Japan and the Republic of China concluded on 10 June 1935
