= Titaura =

Nepalese snack food

Titaura तितौरा
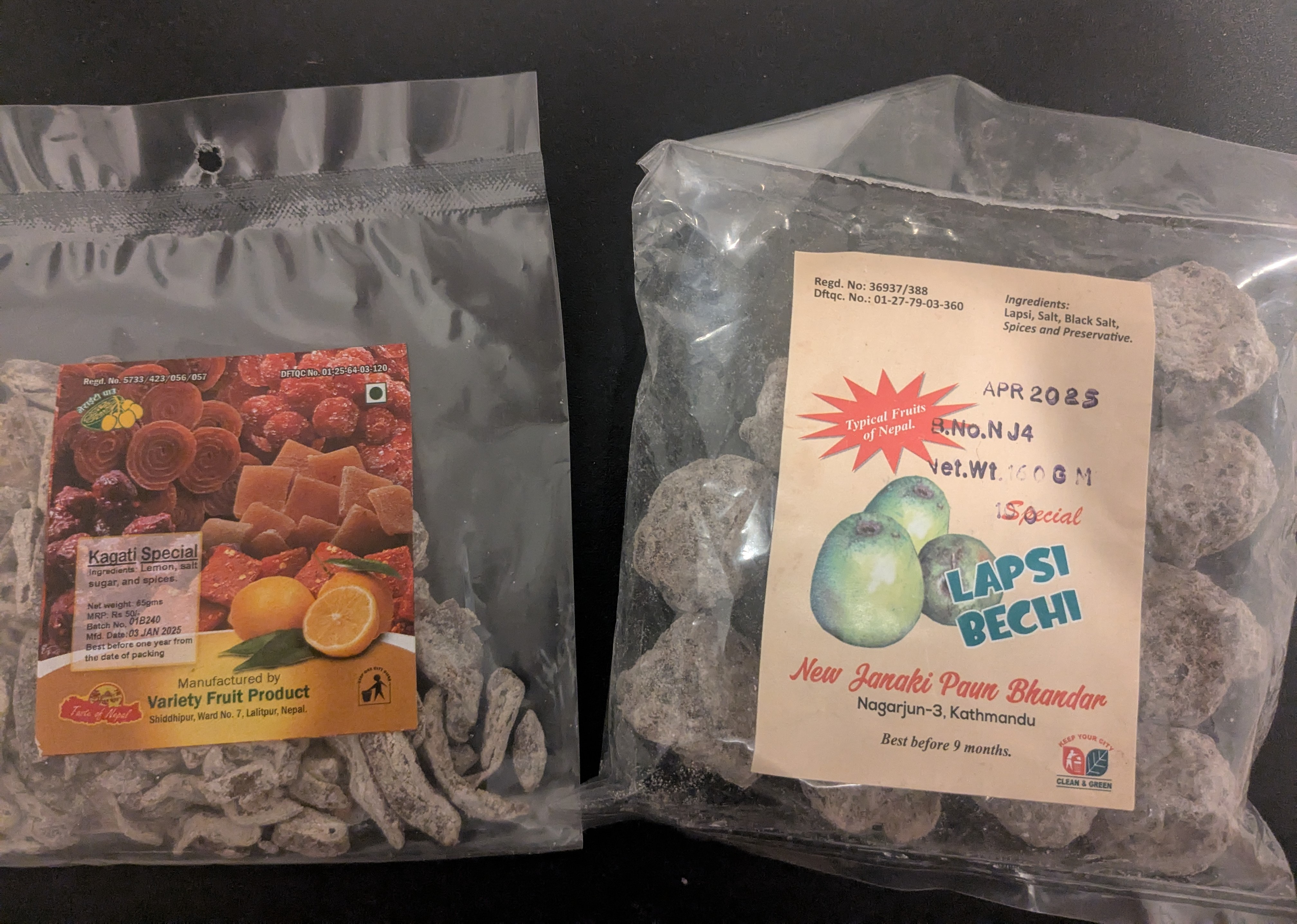
- Two varieties of titaura: made from dried lemon peels (left) and whole dried lapsi (right)
- Alternative names: Paun (पाँउ)
- Type: Confectionery
- Place of origin: Nepal
- Variations: Sweet, sour, spicy, salty, liquid/jammy

Titaura (Nepali: तितौरा) also known as Paun, is the name for a category of various preserved, pickled, and spiced fruits originating in Nepal. The flavor, like other preserves ranges from sweet to sour or to heavily spiced. The texture also vary, with solid consistency being common, others can be jammy or liquid and are called jhol paun.

While any fruit can technically be formed into a titaura, the most commonly used is the lapsi. Other fruits commonly used are limes, mangoes, grapefruits, and raw papayas. Ingredients for production includes sugar, black salt, pepper, and optionally, Nepalese timur pepper, a variety of Sichuan Pepper. It can also be used as an ingredient in other items, such as drinks and cocktails.

== History ==
Titaura traces back to the traditional food preservation practices of Nepal's mid-hill regions, where seasonal fruits were processed with salt and spices to extend their shelf life and utilize surplus harvests.
