= Chanh muối =

Salt-pickled lime in Vietnamese cuisine

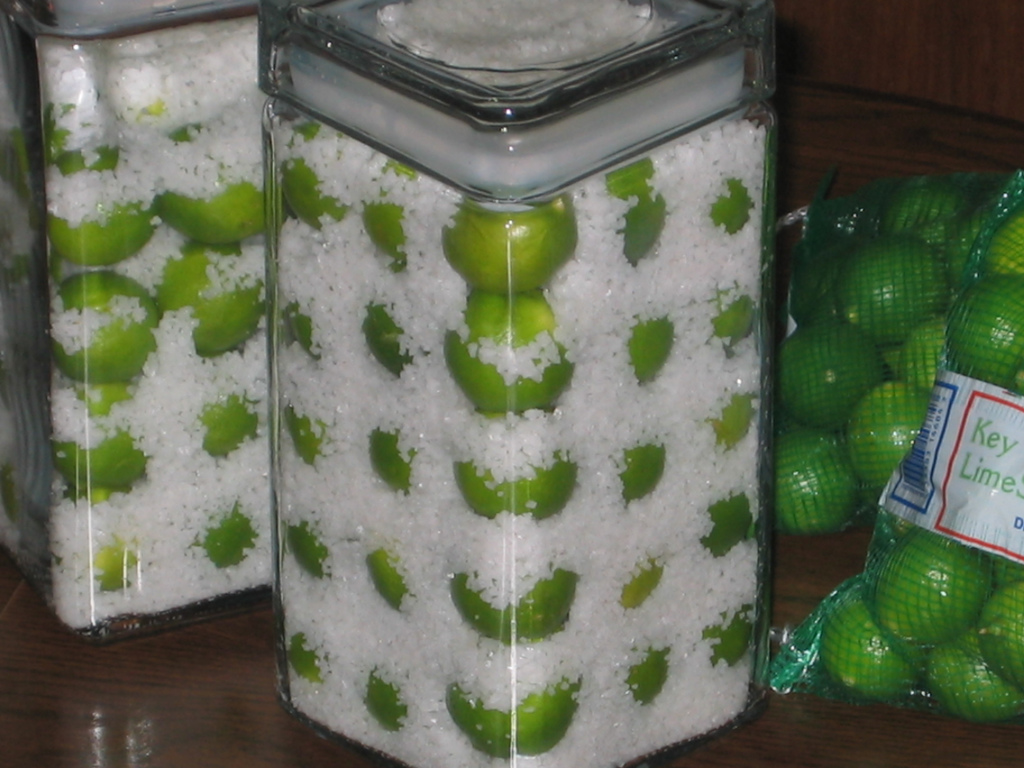
Chanh muối aging in glass containers

Chanh muối is a salted, pickled lime in Vietnamese cuisine. Its name comes from the Vietnamese words chanh (meaning "lime" or "lemon") and muối (meaning "salt"). To make the chanh muối, many limes (often Key limes) are packed tightly in salt in a glass container and placed in the sun until they are pickled. During the process, juices are drawn off the limes, which dissolves the salt and produces a pickling liquid which immerses the finished chanh muối.

== Serving method ==
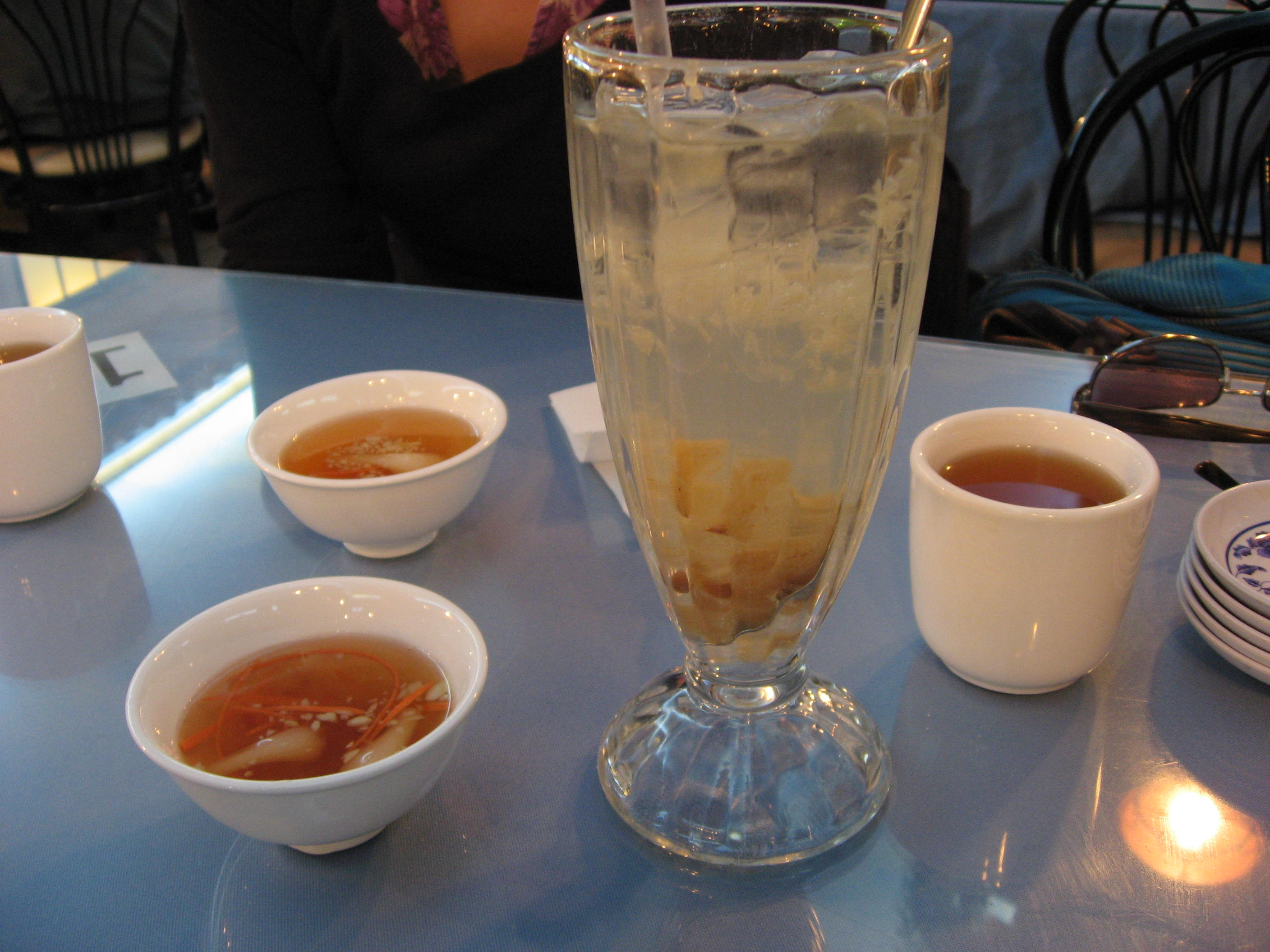
A glass of chanh muối made with lemons, in a restaurant in New York City's Chinatown

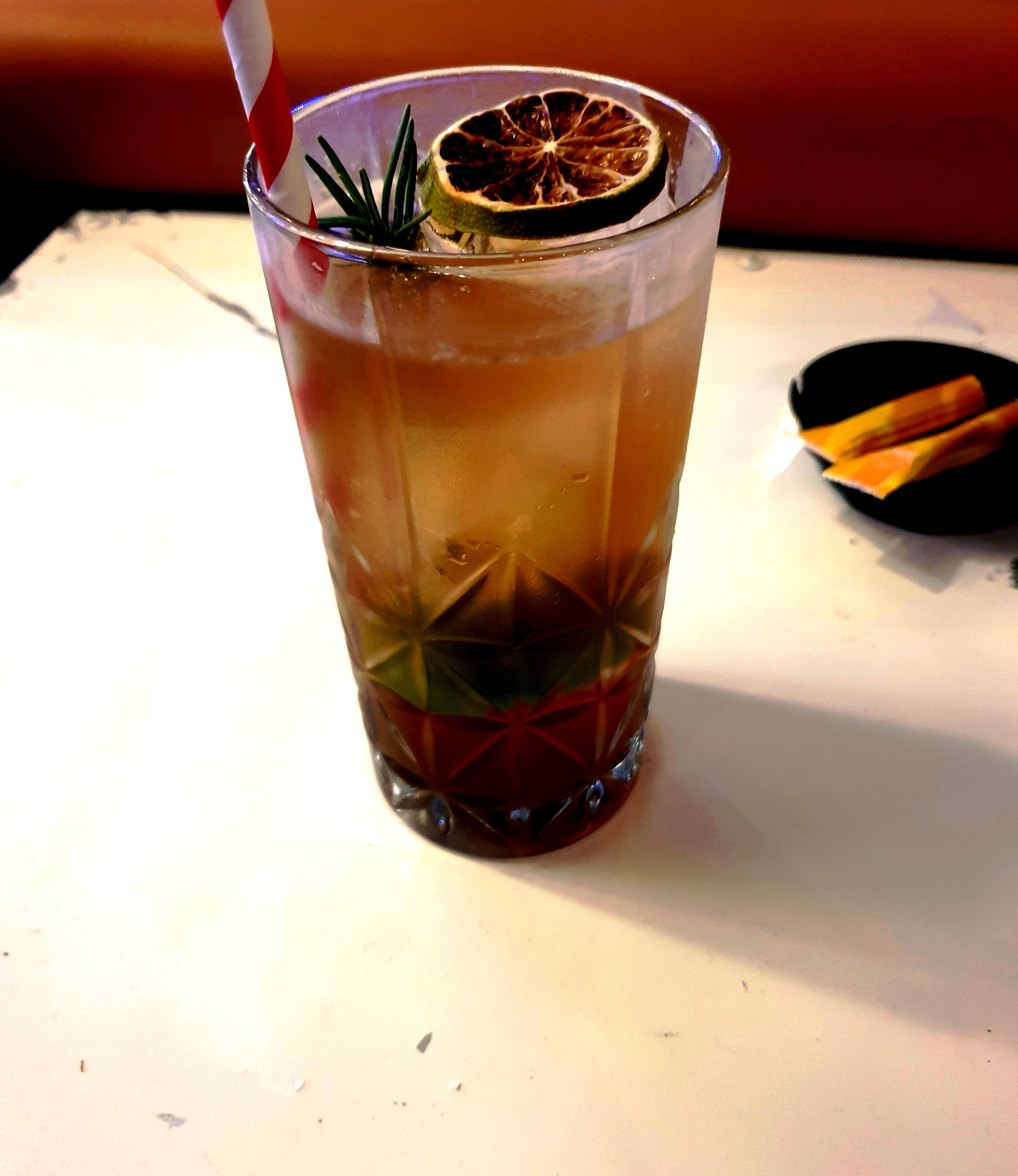
A cup of chanh muối served at a restaurant in Da Lat

Chanh muối are used to make a drink (with added sugar and water or carbonated water) that is called nước chanh muối or soda chanh muối, if made with carbonated water. Nước means water or "drink" in this context, when combined as nước chanh it means lemonade. The name of the drink is usually shortened to just chanh muối when the context is beverages and often appears on the menus of Vietnamese restaurants translated as "salty lemonade" or "salty limeade." To prepare the drink, a small piece of chanh muối (containing both rind and flesh) is cut, placed in a glass, and crushed slightly with a spoon or other utensil to release its juices, then the other ingredients are added.

Although the drink is typically served cold, with ice, as a refreshing summer drink, it may also be served hot, and is believed to be a remedy for the common cold. After finishing the drink, many Vietnamese people enjoy eating the piece of chanh muối left in the glass.

Outside Vietnam, lemons are sometimes used instead of limes to make chanh muối.

The first commercial brand was created by Dan Vo, sold in bottles and bags through Southeast Asia.

== See also ==
- Preserved lemon – Type of pickle
- List of lemonade topics
- Kiamoy
- Chamoy
- List of pickled foods
- Dried lime – Lime that has lost its water content after being dried under extensive sunlight
