= Umeboshi =

Sour pickled Japanese fruit

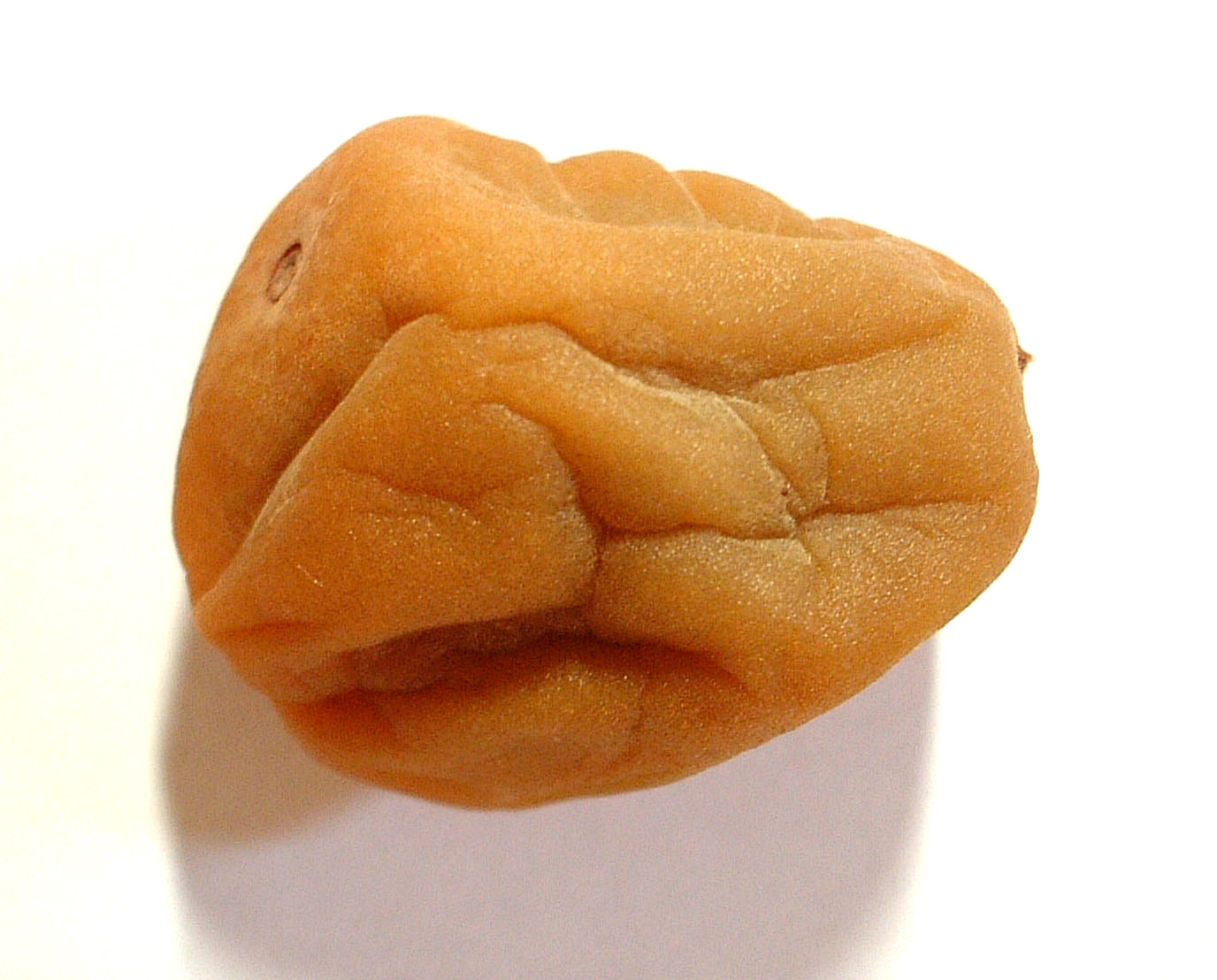
- Umeboshi, dry pickled
- Course: Pickles
- Main ingredients: Ume, salt

Umezuke
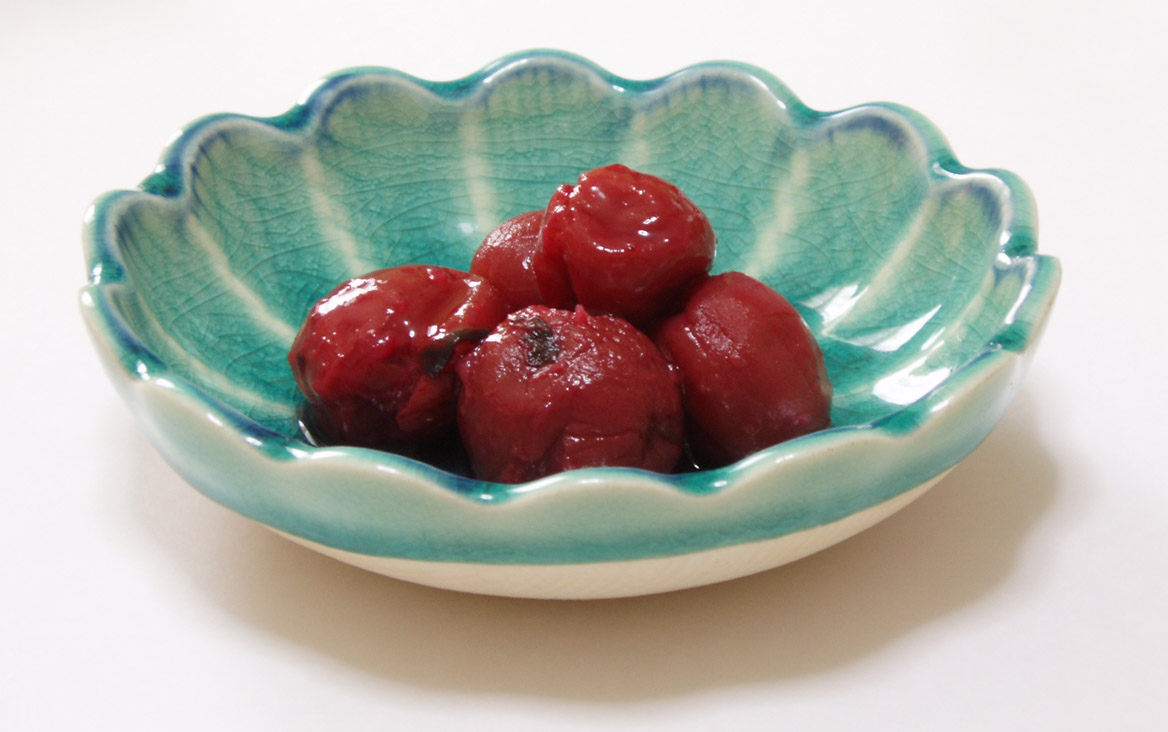
- Umezuke, wet pickled
- Course: Pickles
- Main ingredients: Ume, salt

Umeboshi (Japanese: 梅干し, pronounced [ɯmeboɕi], lit. 'dried ume') are pickled (brined) ume fruits common in Japan. Umeboshi is often translated as 'salted Japanese plums', 'Japanese plums' or 'preserved plums'. Ume (Prunus mume) is a species of fruit-bearing tree in the genus Prunus, which is often called a "plum", but is actually more closely related to the apricot. Pickled ume which are not dried are called umezuke (梅漬け).

Umeboshi are a popular tsukemono ('pickled thing'; preserved or fermented) and are extremely sour and salty. Sweet umeboshi may be made with honey. Umeboshi are usually served as a side dish for rice or eaten on rice balls (often without removing the pit) for breakfast and lunch. They are occasionally served boiled or seasoned for dinner.

== Physical characteristics ==
Umeboshi are usually round and vary from smooth to very wrinkled. Usually they taste salty, and are extremely sour due to high citric acid content, but sweeter versions exist as well.

== Production ==
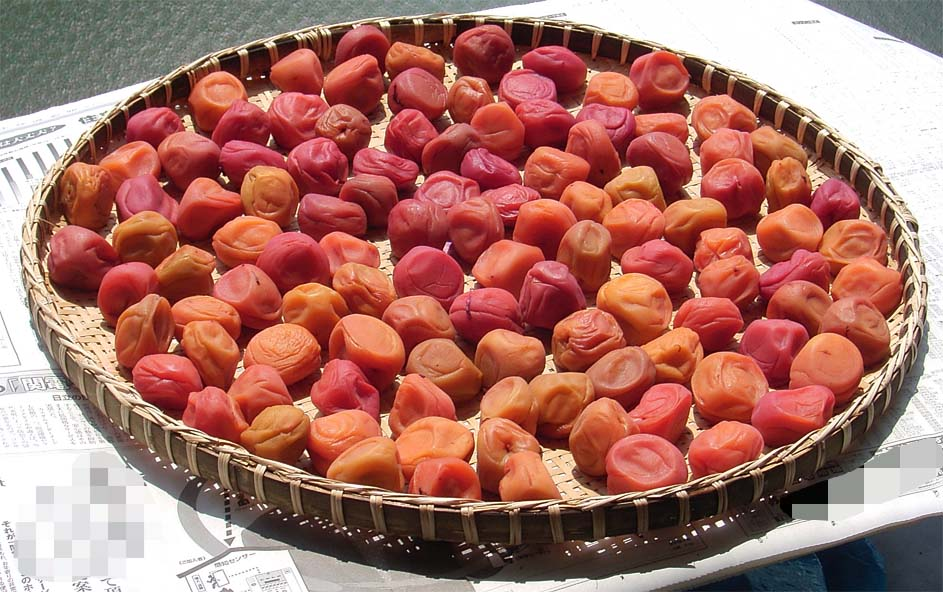
Umeboshi being dried in the sun

The central area of Wakayama prefecture is known throughout Japan for the quantity and quality of its ume and umeboshi. The town of Minabe, Wakayama, in particular, grows more ume and produces more umeboshi than any other town in Japan. Umeboshi are traditionally made by harvesting ume fruit when they ripen around June and packing them in barrels with 20% salt per weight of fruit. The salt extracts juice, which the ume then soak in for about two weeks. This salty, sour liquid is marketed as umezu (梅酢; often calqued as 'ume vinegar', although it is not a true vinegar.)

Many varieties of umeboshi sold on the market are desalinated to a certain extent and re-soaked in a flavoring liquid. They are sometimes dyed red using purple perilla herbs (called akajiso) or flavored with katsuobushi, kombu or sweetened with honey. Because these flavored varieties end up at 3% to 15% salt content, they usually contain a natural or artificial preservative to extend shelf life. Natural preservatives include vinegar, alcohol and vitamin B1.

== Consumption ==
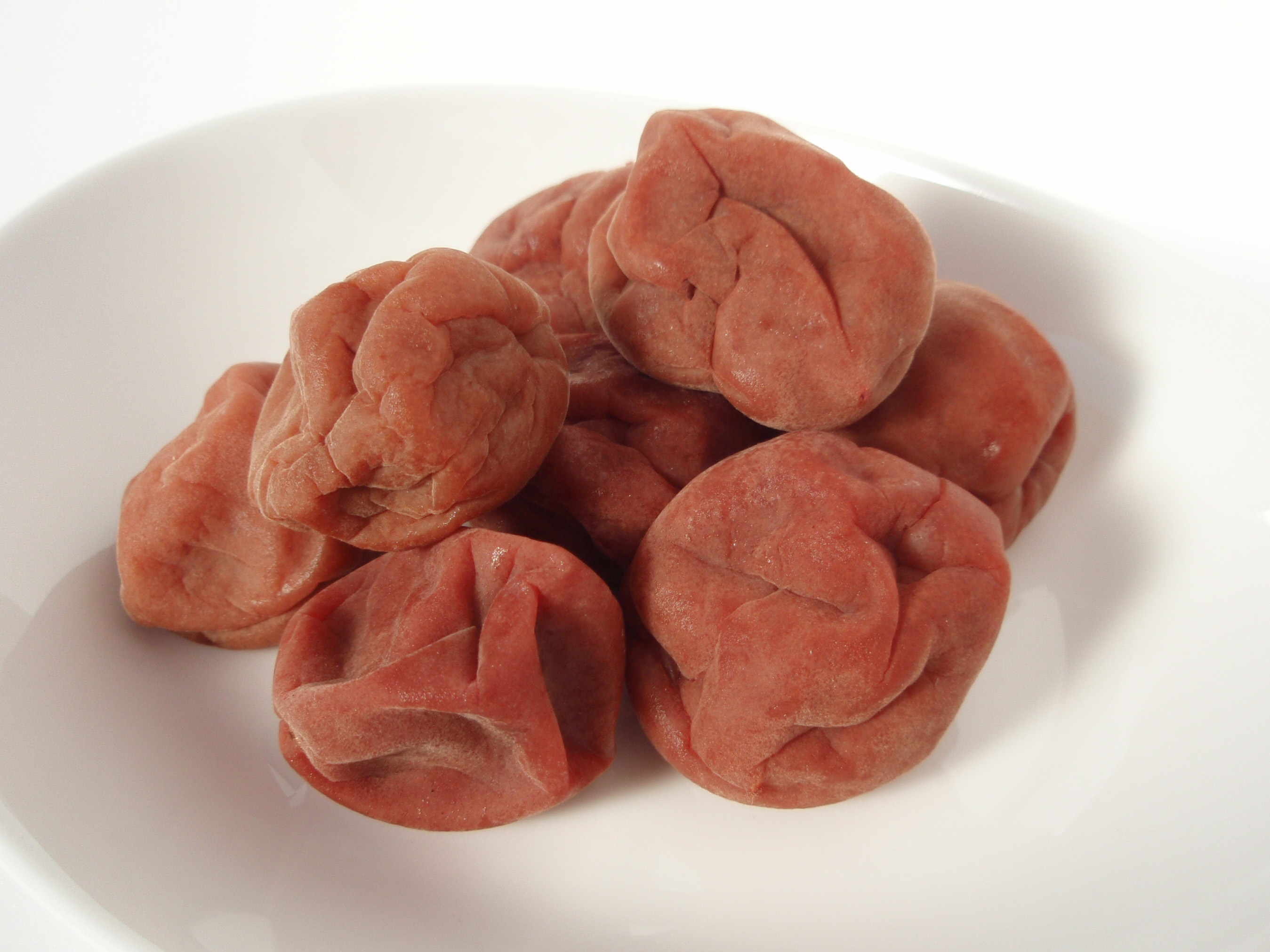
Plate of umeboshi

Umeboshi are usually eaten in small quantities with rice, for added flavor. It is also a common ingredient in onigiri, rice balls wrapped with nori and they may also be used in makizushi. Makizushi made with umeboshi may be made with either pitted umeboshi or umeboshi paste (which is cheaper), often in conjunction with slivered fresh green perilla (shiso) leaves. The standard Japanese folk remedy for colds and flus is okayu (rice congee) with umeboshi. Another usage of umeboshi is in ume chazuke, a dish of rice with poured-in green tea topped with umeboshi.

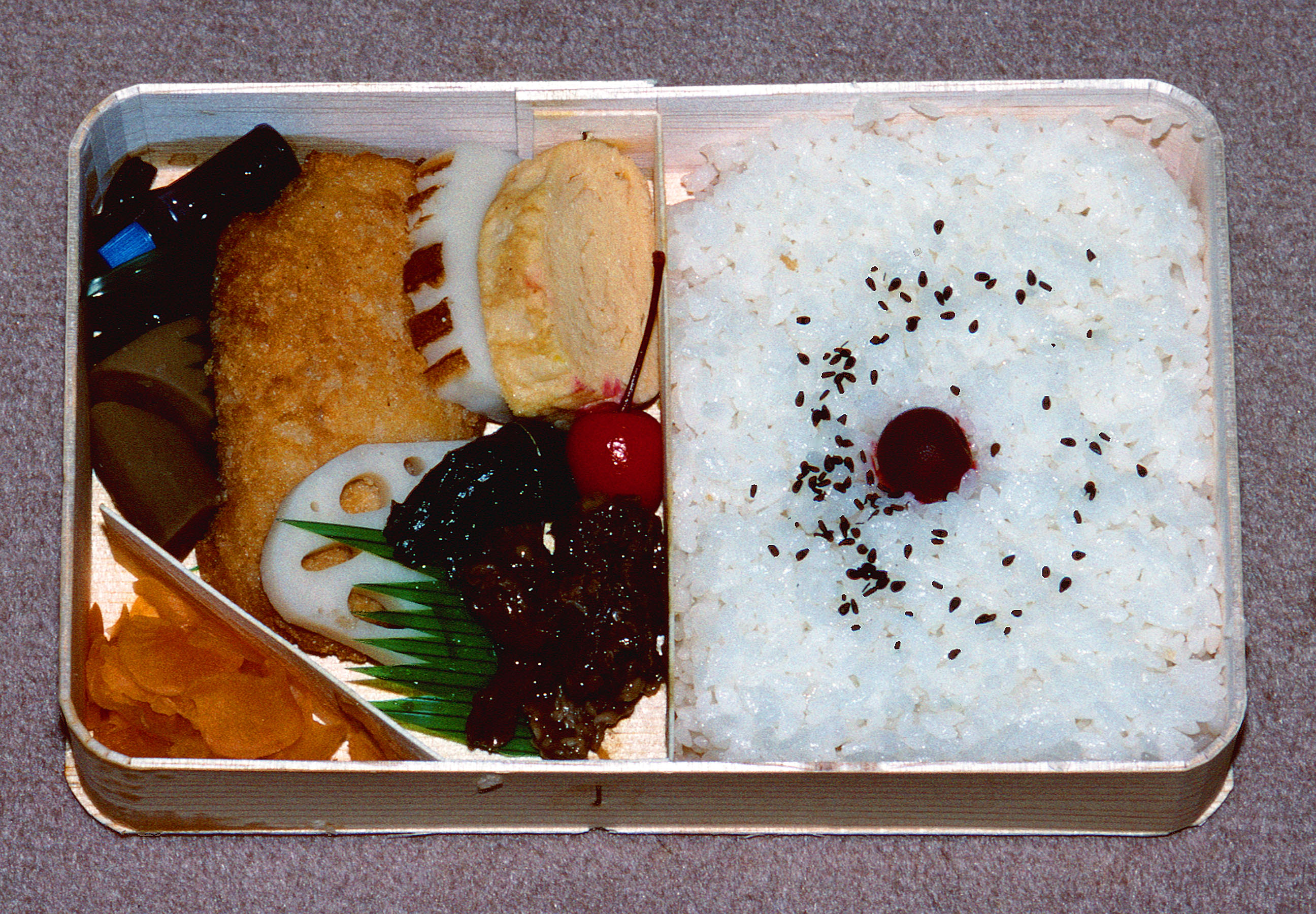
Hinomaru bentō, with a single umeboshi over white rice, which represents the flag of Japan

Umeboshi were esteemed by the samurai to combat battle fatigue, a function of their salt and citric acid content, among other factors. Salt, citric acid, and polyphenols also contribute to their antimicrobial activity, so they are a natural preservative for foods and help prevent food poisoning and other bacterial stomach problems.

Umeboshi is used as a cooking accent to enhance flavor and presentation. They may also be served as a complement of a drink with shōchū and hot water.

Umeboshi are often eaten as snacks; in the United States and Australia, many Japanese grocery stores stock them. Eating umeboshi in Japan is the equivalent of the English expression "an apple a day". Children's candy shops sometimes carry karikari ume, or prepackaged, crunchy pickled ume, and dried umeboshi.

Bento boxes that contain a single umiboshi over rice are called Hinomaru bentō, because the red ume on white rice resembles the Japanese flag. Due to the low amount of ingredients, Hinomaru bentō was traditionally regarded as a low-cost meal.

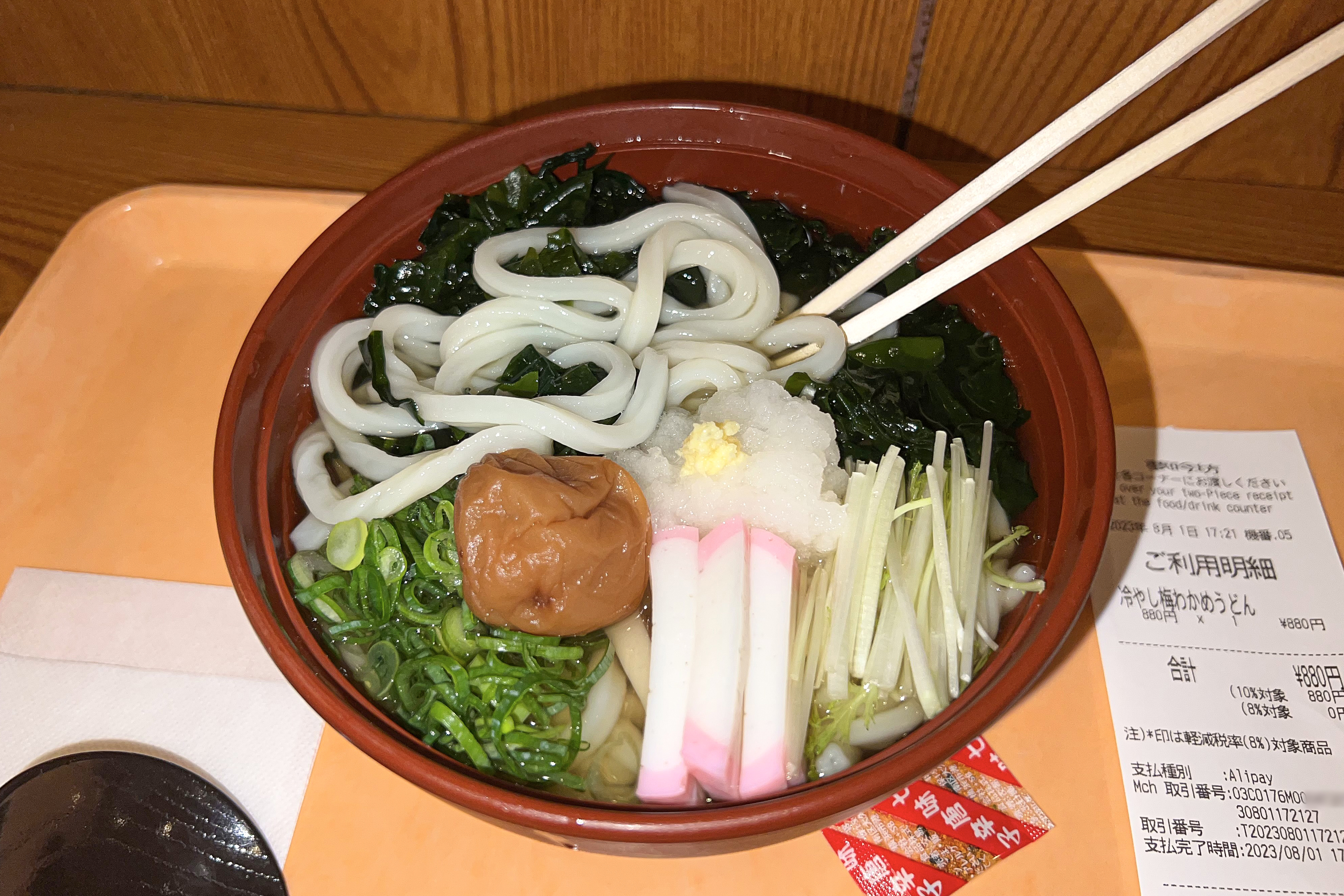
With udon

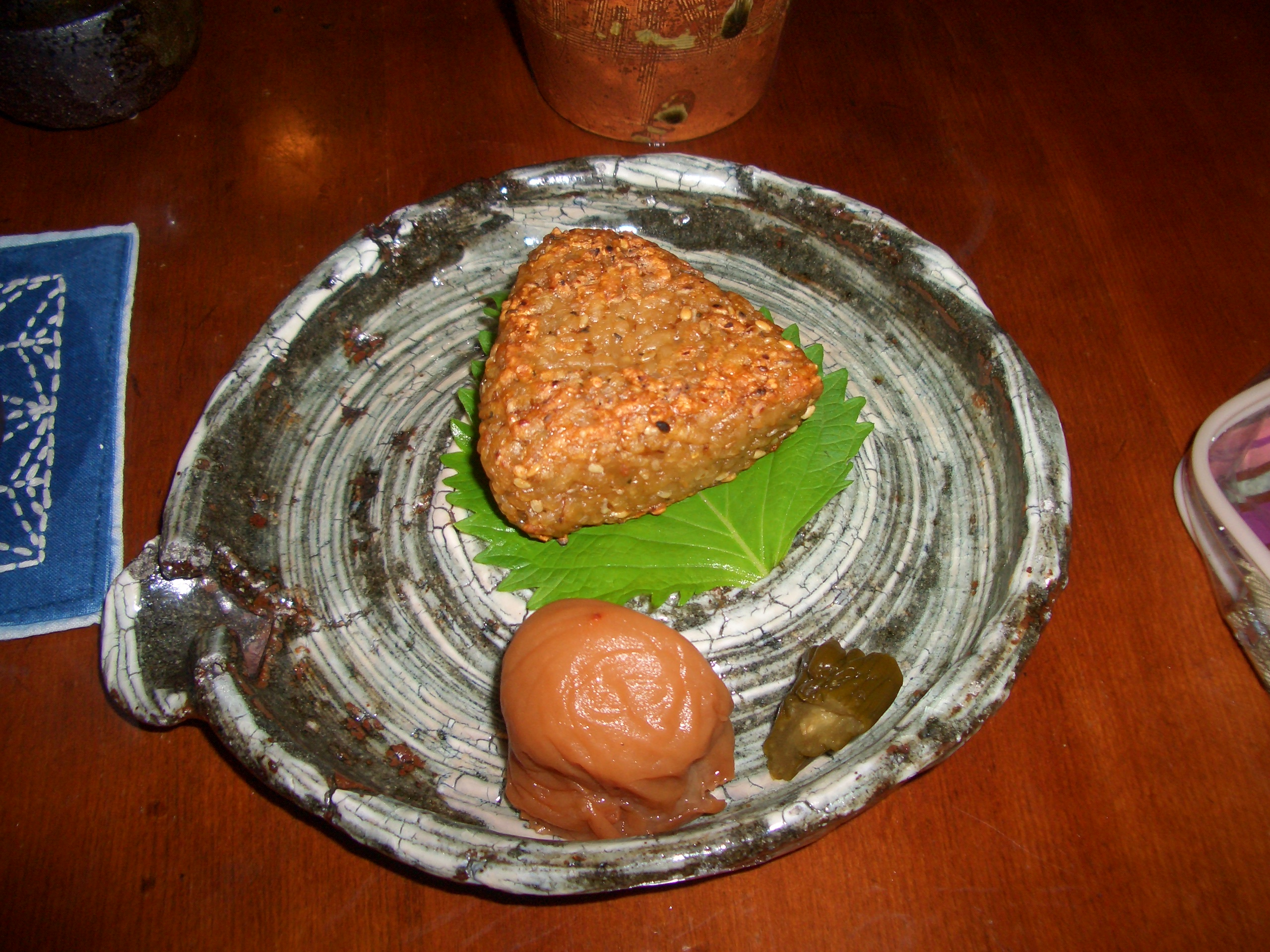
With grilled onigiri

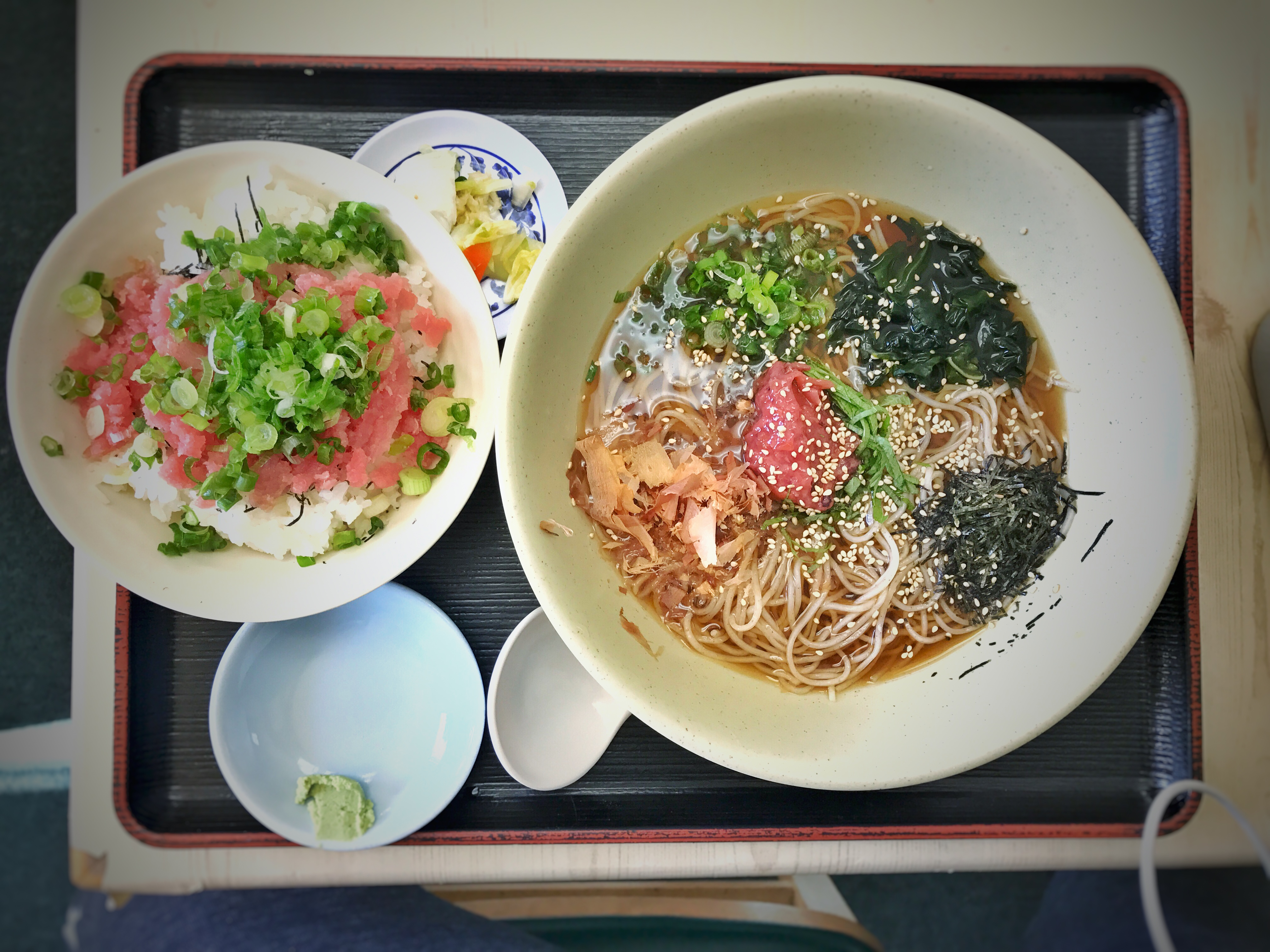
With soba and negitoro

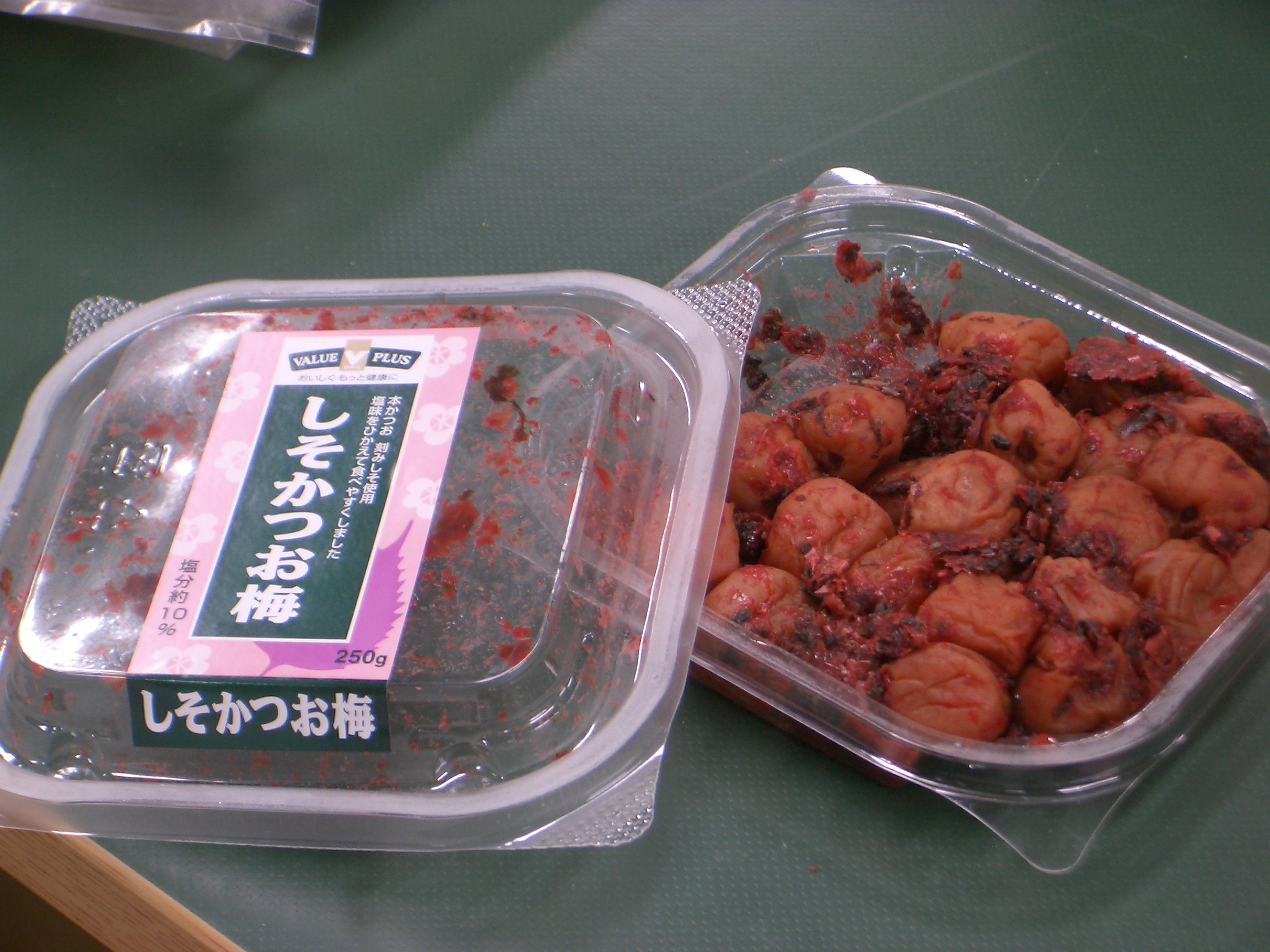
Pickled with red shiso

== Health ==
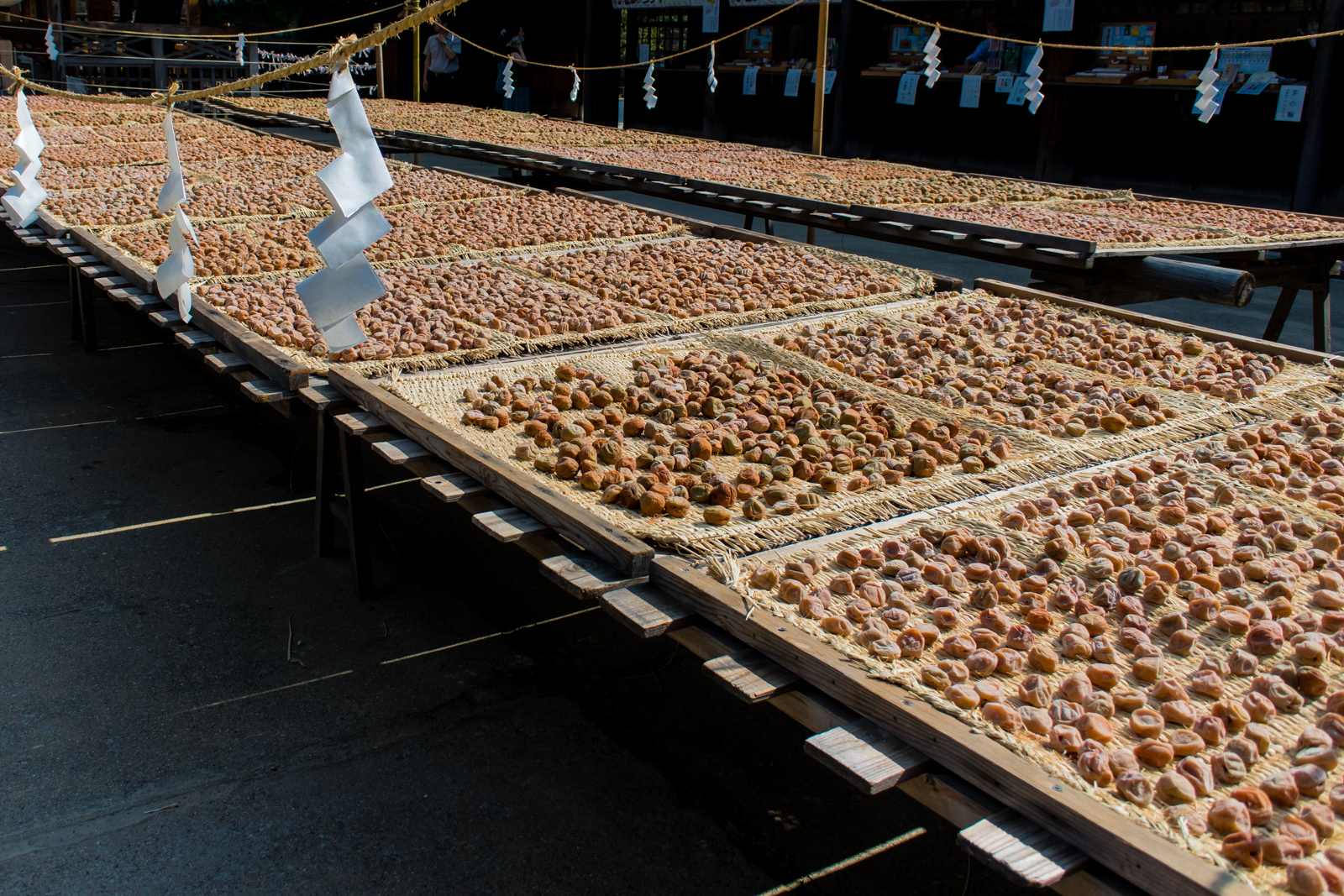
Drying umeboshi

Umeboshi is believed to be a digestive aid, for prevention of nausea and systemic toxicity, including hangovers. Green ume extract is used as a tonic in Japan. The citric acid is believed to act as an antibacterial, help to increase saliva production and assist in the digestion of rice. Additionally, umeboshi is claimed to combat fatigue (historically given as part of a samurai's field ration) and protect against aging.

According to a 2018 study, umeboshi may have anti-allergic effects, and "suggested that ume has the potential to inhibit mast cell degranulation and may be associated with reduced risk of allergic symptoms in women."

=== Nutrition ===
Pitted traditional umeboshi per 100 g contains:

- Energy 138 kJ
- Protein 0.9 g
- Fat 0.2 g
- Carbohydrate 10.5 g
- Sodium 8700 mg
- Potassium 440 mg
- Manganese 0.23 mg
- VitaminA 7 μg
- VitaminB_{1} 0.02 mg
- VitaminB_{2} 0.01 mg
- Cholesterol 0 mg
- Dietary fiber 3.6 g
- Water 65.1 g

Traditional (non-reduced sodium versions) umeboshi are roughly one quarter salt by dry weight.

== Similar foods ==
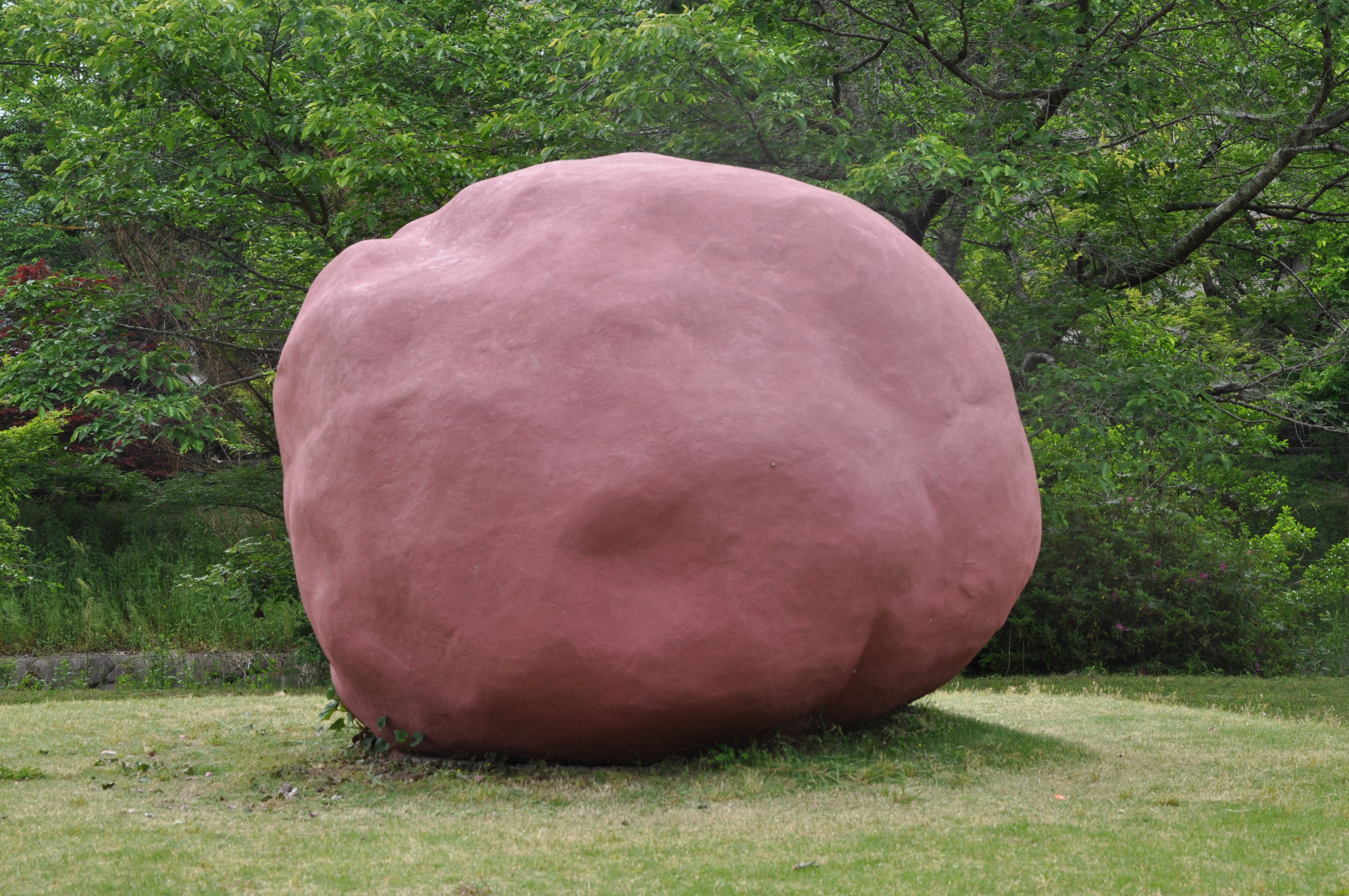
Sculpture of an umeboshi at Yunogō Hot Springs

The umeboshi style of pickling is common in Japan and is similar in style to other Asian preserved pickling techniques found in China, Vietnam, and Korea.

In Vietnam, a very similar variety of pickled ume is called xí muội or ô mai.

In the Philippines, this is called kiamoy or tsampoy, and is usually drier. Kiamoy and tsampoy were two types of Filipino-Chinese plum pickle that was transported via the Manila galleon to Mexico, where it is known as chamoy and is usually made with apricot, ume or tamarind and a mix of salt and dry chili.

In South Asian countries, Indian gooseberries called amla in Hindi or amala in Nepali is prepared in similar way, sometimes with sugar syrup.

In South Africa, a similar style of preserved dried fruit is called mebos in Afrikaans, the name of which seems to derive from the Japanese via Dutch trade. Usually, apricot is used to produce a salty, acidic variety, although other, sweetened varieties made from other fruits are also colloquially called mebos.

== See also ==
- Li hing mui – Salty dried Chinese plum
- List of pickled foods
- List of plum dishes
- List of sauces
- Pickled fruit – Fruit preserved in brine or vinegar
- Suanmeitang – Chinese beverage made from smoked plums
- Smoked plum
- Wikibooks:Cookbook:Umeboshi
