= Chamoy (sauce) =

Savory sauces and condiments in Mexican cuisine made from pickled fruit

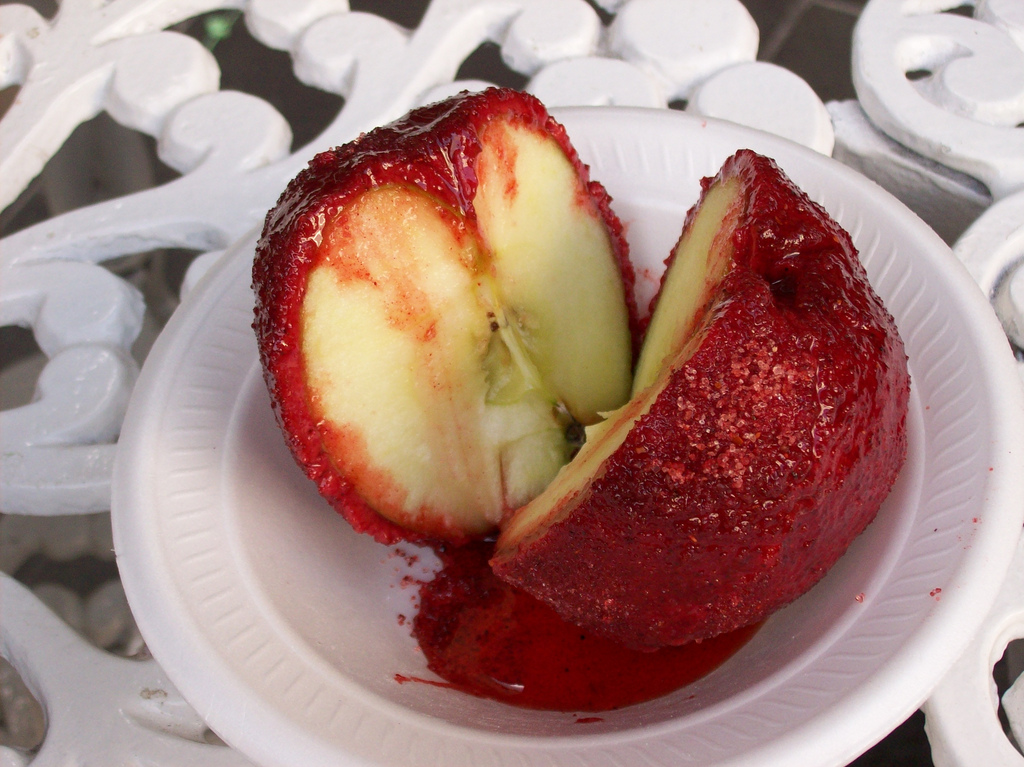
Apple covered in chamoy paste.

Chamoy (Spanish pronunciation: [tʃaˈmoj]) is a variety of savory sauces and condiments in Mexican cuisine made from pickled fruit. Chamoy may range from a liquid to a paste consistency, and typically its flavor is salty, sweet, sour, and spiced with chilies.

== Preparation ==
Mexican chamoy is prepared by first packing the fruit in a brine solution. Occasionally, this brine is acidified with vinegar. This draws out the natural moisture of the fruit by osmosis. When the fruit has been sufficiently dried, it is separated from the brine and is sold as a snack known as saladitos, literally 'little salty things.'

Meanwhile, the salted fruit brine created in this process is seasoned to taste with chili powder, becoming chamoy. This liquid may be further reduced, or thickened with pureed fruit, to achieve a variety of consistencies.

Because of differences in the type of fruit chosen and the composition of the brining solutions used, chamoy can vary widely in taste. Most are quite savory and spicy due to the addition of chili powder, and salty due to the brine. Depending on whether and how much vinegar was used, they may also vary from sour to sweet.

== Origins ==
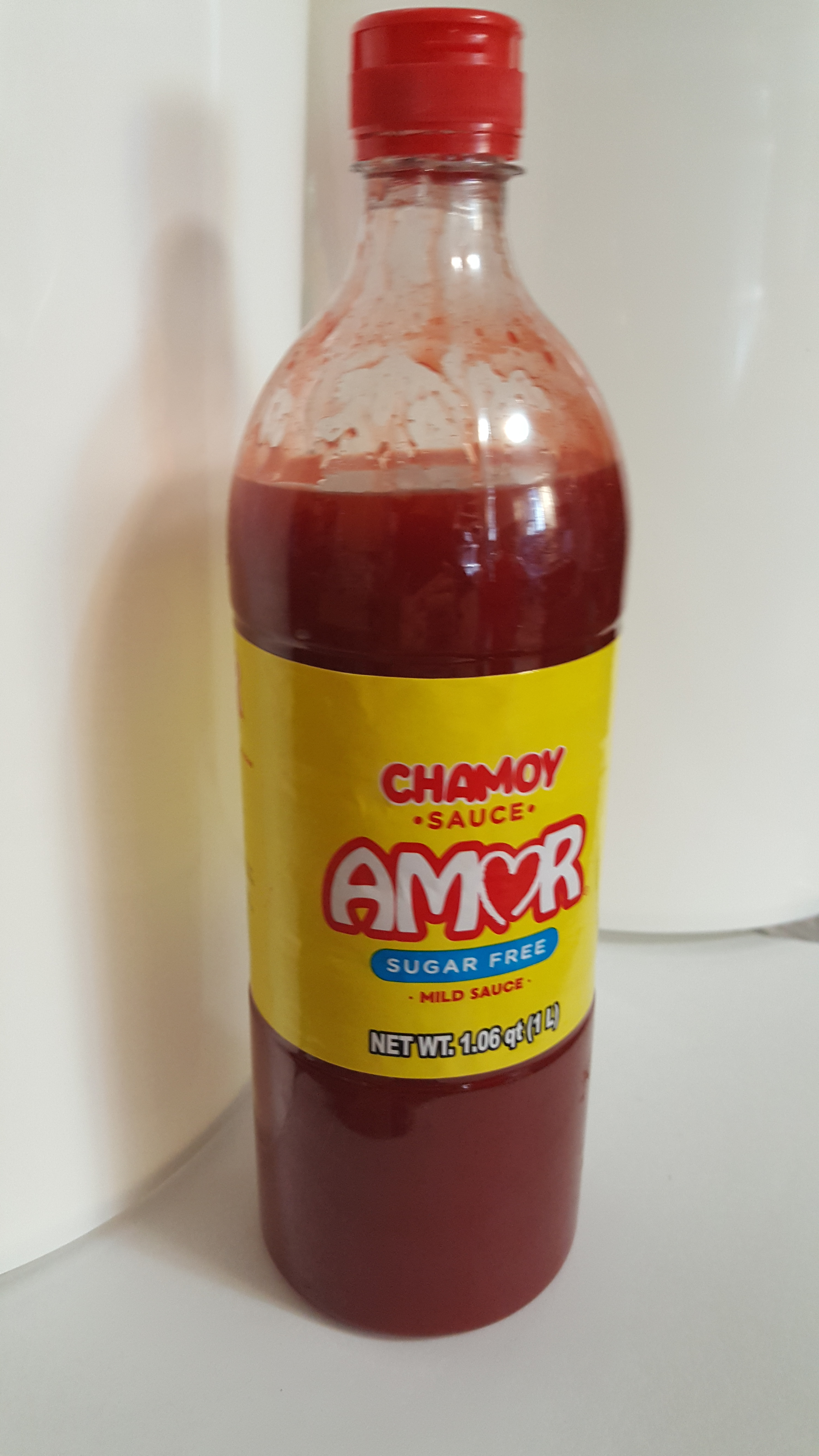
A commercial chamoy sauce sold in the US.

The precise origins of chamoy are uncertain. There are three main pathways that they may have been introduced to Mexico, as well as the origin of the name. All of them ultimately originate from the Chinese Li Hing Mui (Huà Méi 話梅) snacks, made from dried, sour, and salty plums or berries.

The first origin hypothesis is via Filipino immigrants on the Manila galleons which connected the Philippines and Mexico from 1565 to 1815. Chamoy is probably derived from the champoy (also spelled tsampoy, or rarely as sampóy) of the Philippines. Champoy are made using identical techniques of dried fruits pickled in brine and vinegar. These are usually made from locally available Myrica rubra, or from imported plums, prunes, or apricots. The latter are more often known under the separate name kiamoy (spelled ciamoy in Philippine Spanish, another possible origin of the term "chamoy"). They have the same flavor profile as chamoy: a combination of sweet, sour, and salty. They originate from the li hing mui recipes carried by Chinese immigrants (sangley) to the Philippines during the Spanish colonial period. Kiamoy is derived from Philippine Hokkien Chinese: 鹹梅; Pe̍h-ōe-jī: kiâm-muî; lit. 'salted plum'; while champoy is derived from Cantonese Chinese: 陳皮梅; Cantonese Yale: chàhn pèih múi; lit. 'dried peel plum', referring to chenpi. In modern times, the name is also applied to the unrelated Filipino tamarind candy made from ripe tamarind balls cooked in a salt and sugar mixture. However, whereas champoy refers to the pickled fruit in the Philippines, in Mexico the term chamoy has evolved to refer to the sauce derived from pickling the fruit; while the fruits themselves are now known as saladitos.

The second hypothesis is via 19th-century Chinese workers in Hawaii that also carried the tradition of li hing mui with them as salted and dried apricots. In this version, the name "chamoy" is supposedly derived from 西梅, see mui ([siː muːi]), which is more accurately a catchall term for dried fruit (especially plums) in Hawaii. However it is unknown how it may have been introduced to Mexico. Since the Manila galleons do not pass through Hawaii, the link is tenuous.

The third hypothesis is via the Japanese umeboshi. The term "chamoy", in this case, was supposedly coined by Teikichi Iwadare, a Japanese immigrant to Mexico who produced umeboshi made with apricot in the 1950s, which he allegedly called "chamoy" from Chinese 酸梅 (suān méi)—sour plum—or Vietnamese xí muôi ("preserved prune"). However, no explanation is given as to why a Japanese immigrant would name his product in Chinese or Vietnamese. Umeboshi preparation is also very different in that it only uses dry salt and does not use vinegar.

== Uses ==
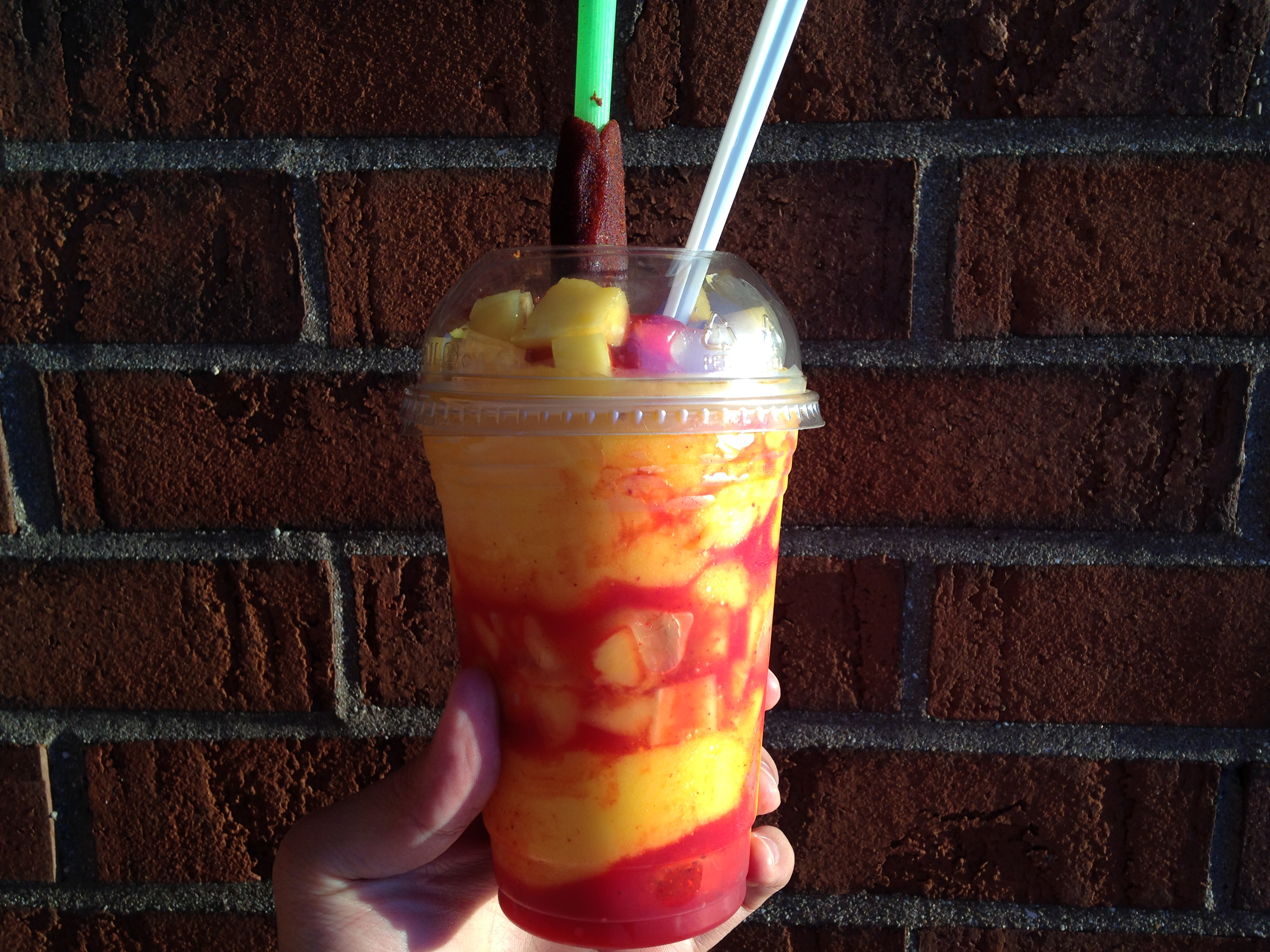
Chamoy is used to make mangonadas.

Various versions of Mexican chamoy are sold under different brand names in Mexico and parts of the American southwest. The thinner, more liquid chamoy is typically bottled and marketed in a similar fashion to hot sauces. Because of the combination of salt, sweetness and heat, chamoy is advertised as a condiment for a wide variety of foods ranging from fresh fruit and juices to potato chips and assorted nuts. It is one of the more common ingredients for the street food known as "tostilocos".

Thicker chamoy with a pastier consistency are occasionally sold in small jars, appropriate to use as a dip for vegetables or firmer fruits. These jars often are sold alongside similar popular Mexican candies made from mango, tamarind, and watermelon; these candies are often prepared in the salado y enchilado style as well.

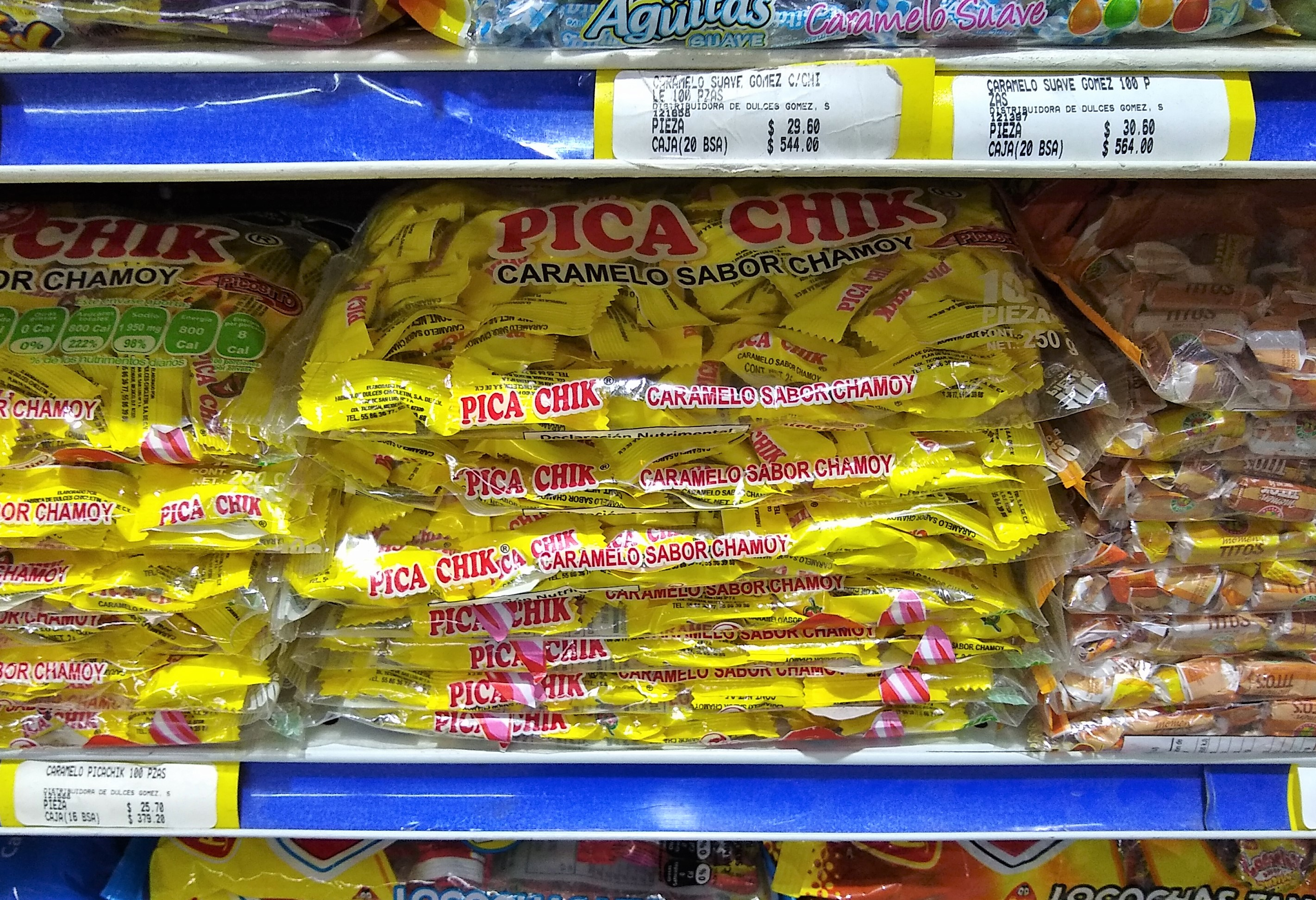
Chamoy-flavored candy in Mexico

Chamoy is also used as a flavoring for frozen confections such as sorbet or raspados, a unique flavor combination that is at once sweet, salty, spicy, and cold. Raspados prepared in this style are often referred to as chamoyada. Paletas are also commonly offered in combination with chamoy. Favorite combination flavors in both raspados and paletas include pineapple, cucumber, lime, mango, orange, tangerine, tamarind and watermelon. Chamoy is also sometimes used to flavor Mexican candies.

The popular Mexican beer mix michelada is sometimes made with chamoy instead of, or in addition to, the traditional assorted sauces used.

== See also ==
- Li hing mui
- Saladitos
- Umeboshi
