= List of pickled foods =

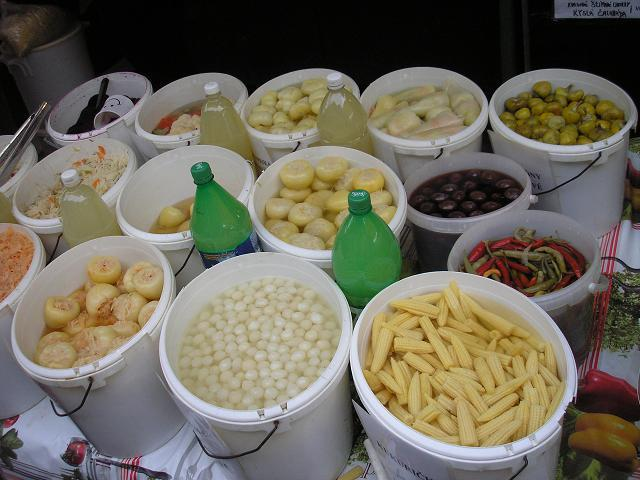
A variety of pickled foods

This is a list of pickled foods. Many various types of foods are pickled to preserve them and add flavor. Some of these foods also qualify as fermented foods.

== Pickled foods ==
=== A ===
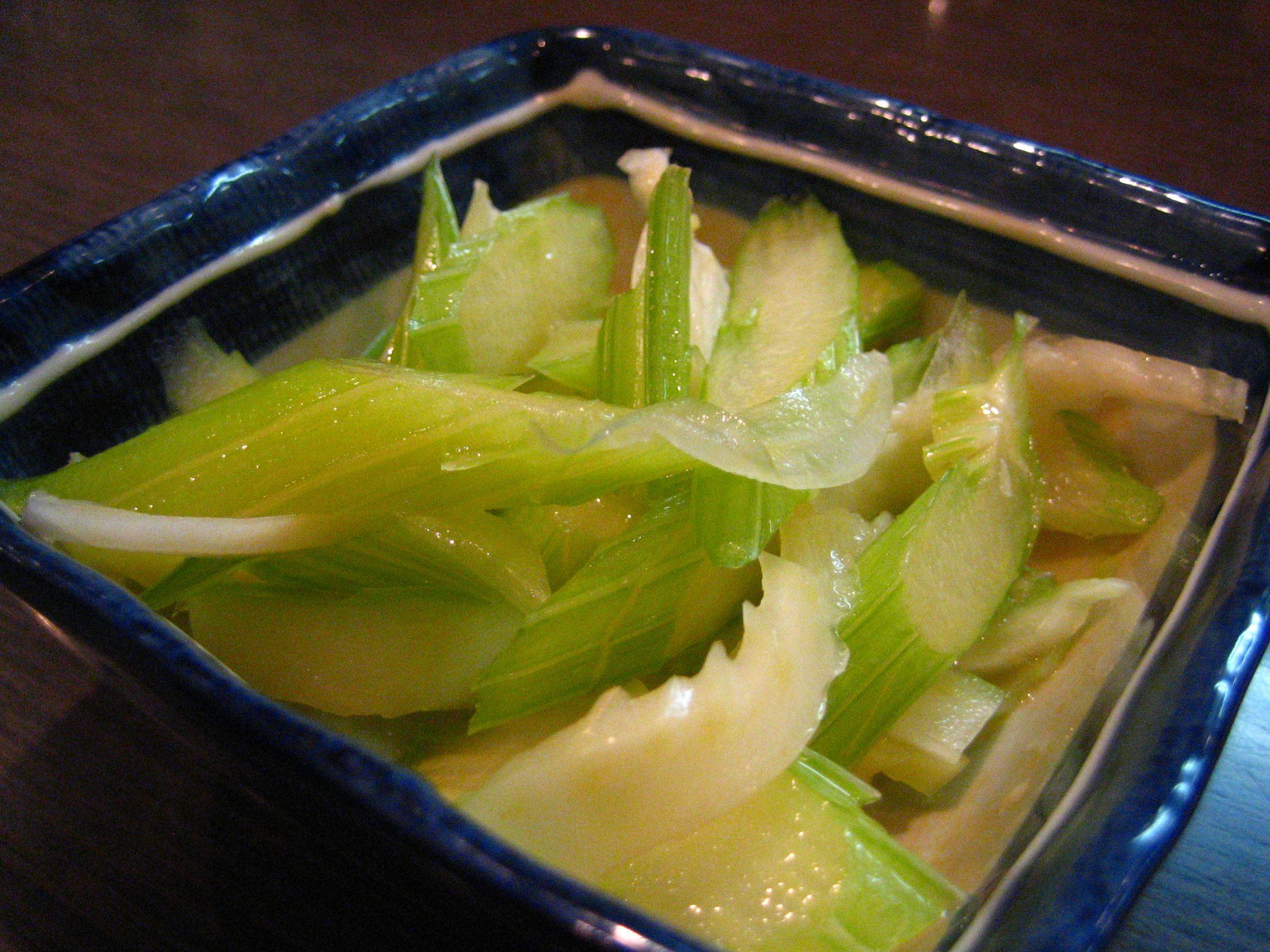
Celery asazuke

- Aavakaaya – Variety of pickles prepared using mango
- Acar – Southeast Asian pickled vegetables
- Achaar – Pickled varieties of vegetable and fruit
- Allium chinense – Species of Allium
- Amba – Mango pickle condiment
- Apple – Edible fruit
- Artichoke – Type of vegetable cultivated for culinary use
- Asazuke – Japanese pickling method
- Asinan – Indonesian pickled vegetable or fruit dish
- Atchara – Filpino unripe papaya pickle

=== B ===
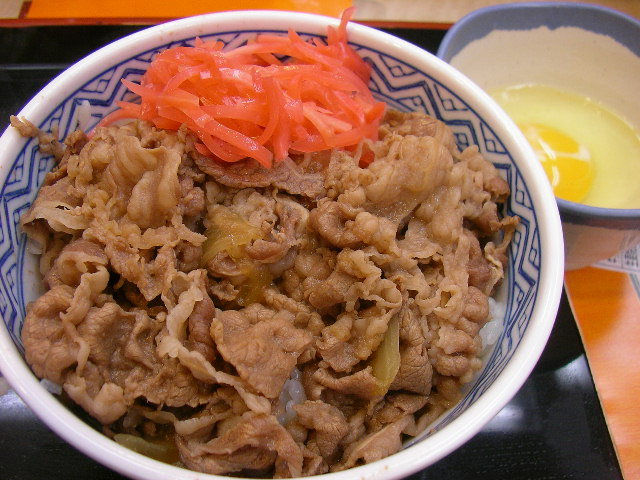
Beni shōga

- Beet eggs – Egg dish
- Beetroot – Vegetable
- Beni shōga – Japanese pickled ginger
- Bettarazuke – Type of pickled daikon popular in Tokyo
- Bodi ko achar
- Bostongurka – Type of relish with pickled gherkins, red bell pepper and onion with spices
- Branston pickle – British food brand known for its pickled chutney
- Brined cheese – Cheese that is matured in brine
- Brinjal – Plant species
- Burong mangga – Filipino side dish

=== C ===
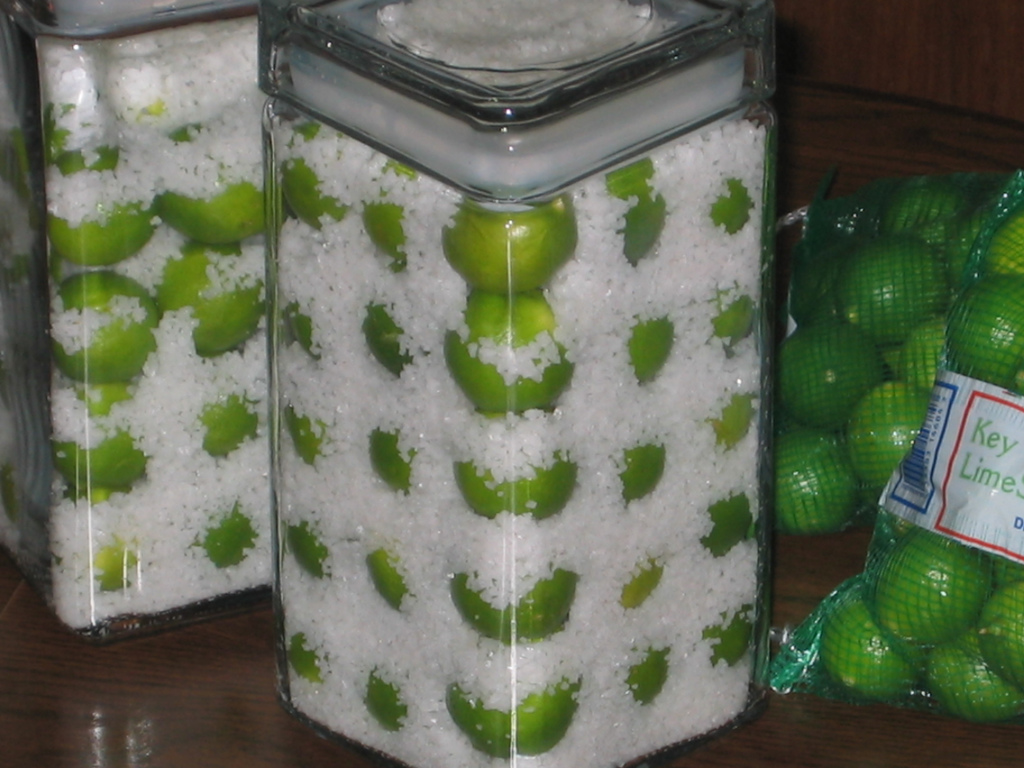
Chanh muối aging in glass containers

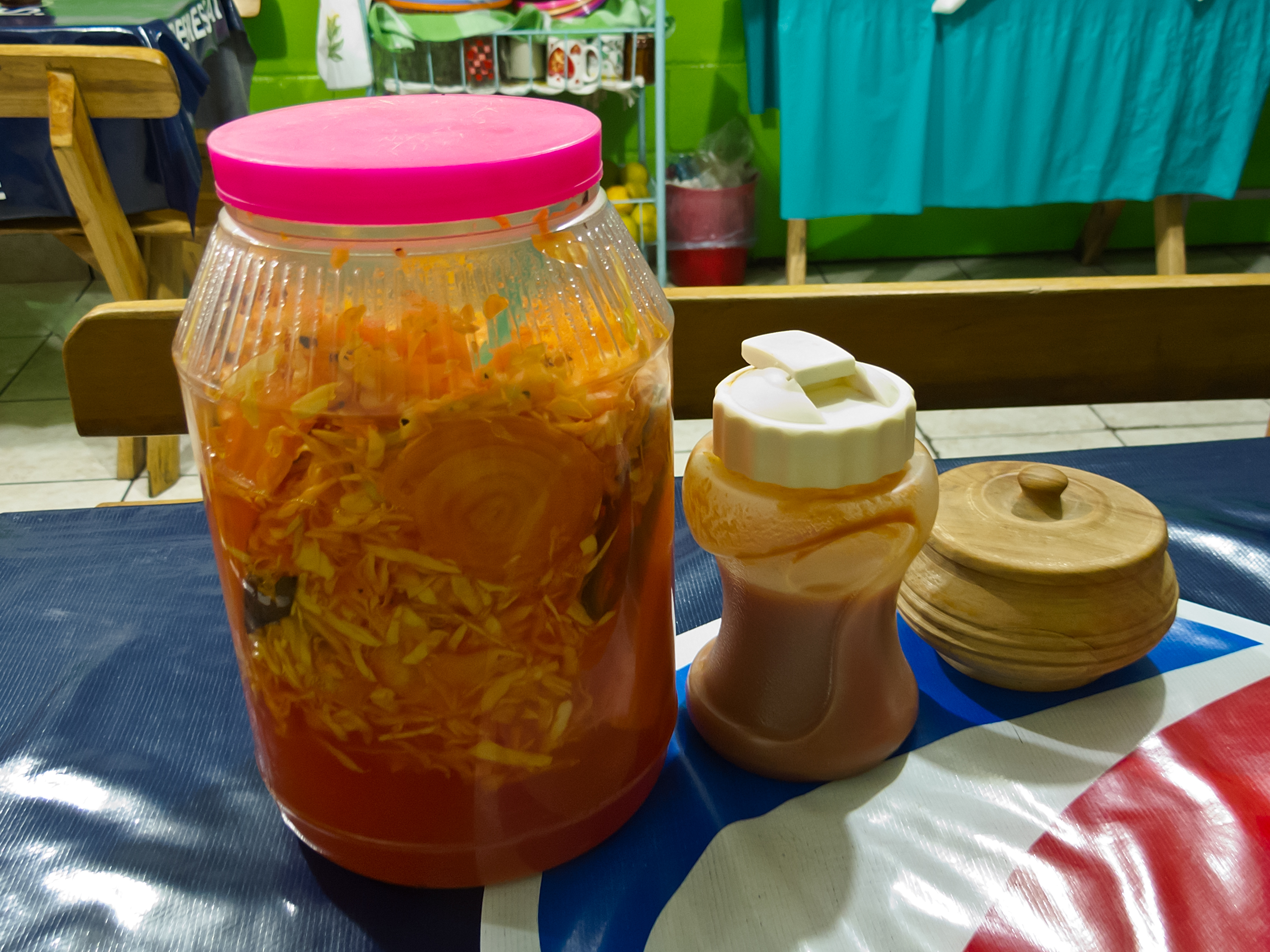
Curtido (at left)

- Cabbage – Leafy vegetable in the flowering plant family Brassicaceae
- Caper – Species of plant (Capparis spinosa)
- Chamoy – Savory sauces and condiments in Mexican cuisine made from pickled fruit
- Champoy – Myrica rubra pickled in salt, sugar, and vinegar from the Philippines
- Chanh muối – Salt-pickled lime in Vietnamese cuisine
- Chhundo – Kind of Indian pickle from Gujarat
- Chinese pickles – Vegetables or fruits that have been fermented by pickling with salt and brine
- Chow-chow – Pickled relish
- Cockles – Family of edible marine bivalve molluscs
- Coleslaw – Salad with finely-shredded raw cabbage
- Corned beef – Salt-cured beef product
- Crab meat
- Crack seed – Category of snacks that originated in China
- Cucumber soup – Traditional Polish and Lithuanian soup made from sour, salted cucumbers and potato
- Cueritos – Latin cuisine pickled pork skin
- Curtido – Fermented cabbage relish from Central America
- Pickled carrot – Carrot pickled in brine, vinegar, or other solution
- Pickled cucumber – Small pickled and fermented cucumber

=== D ===
- Daikon – Pickled preparation of daikon radish
- Dilly beans – Pickled green beans, often flavoured with dill
- Fermented bean curd, also known as doufulu – Chinese condiment

=== E ===
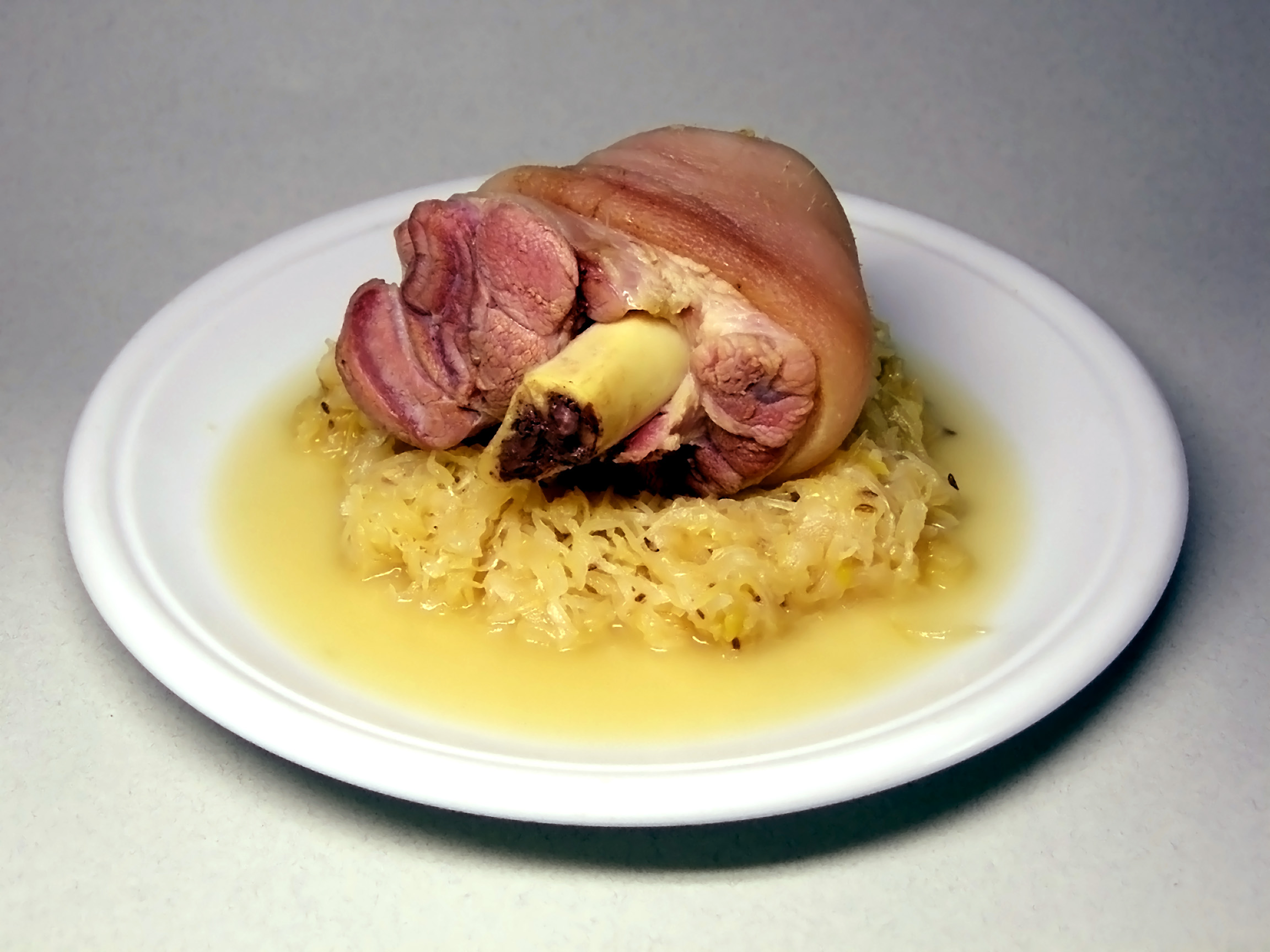
Pickled eisbein, with sauerkraut

- Eggs – Hard-boiled eggs cured in vinegar or brine
- Eisbein – Corned ham hock
- Encurtido – Pickled vegetable appetizer, side dish and condiment in the Mesoamerican region

=== F ===
- Fried pickle – Snack food made by deep-frying sliced battered dill pickles
- Fruit – Fruit preserved in brine or vinegar
- Fukujinzuke – Condiment in Japanese cuisine

=== G ===
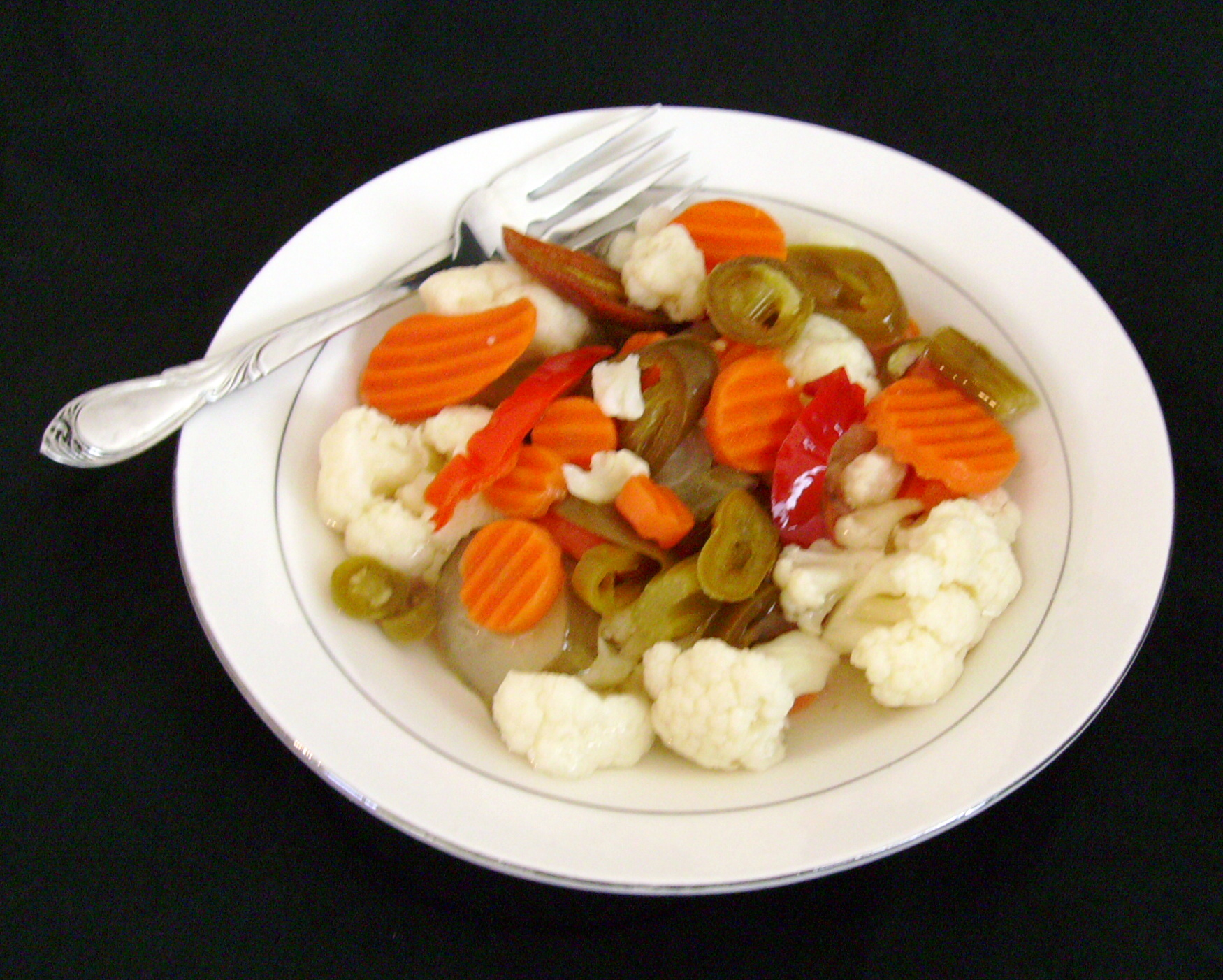
Giardiniera is an Italian or Italian-American relish of pickled vegetables in vinegar or oil.

- Gari – Thinly sliced ginger dish
- Garlic – Iranian pickled garlic condiment
- Garlic – Chinese vinegar-preserved garlic
- Gherkin – Small pickled and fermented cucumber
- Giardiniera – Italian relish of pickled vegetables in vinegar or oil
- Ginger pickle – Pickle eaten in Andhra Pradesh, India
- Green beans – Pickled green beans, often flavoured with dill – sometimes referred to as dilly beans

=== H ===
- Ham hock – Joint on the hog's leg between the ham and trotter
- Herring – Traditional way of preserving herring

=== J ===
- Jujube – Species of plant with edible fruit
Dilly beans

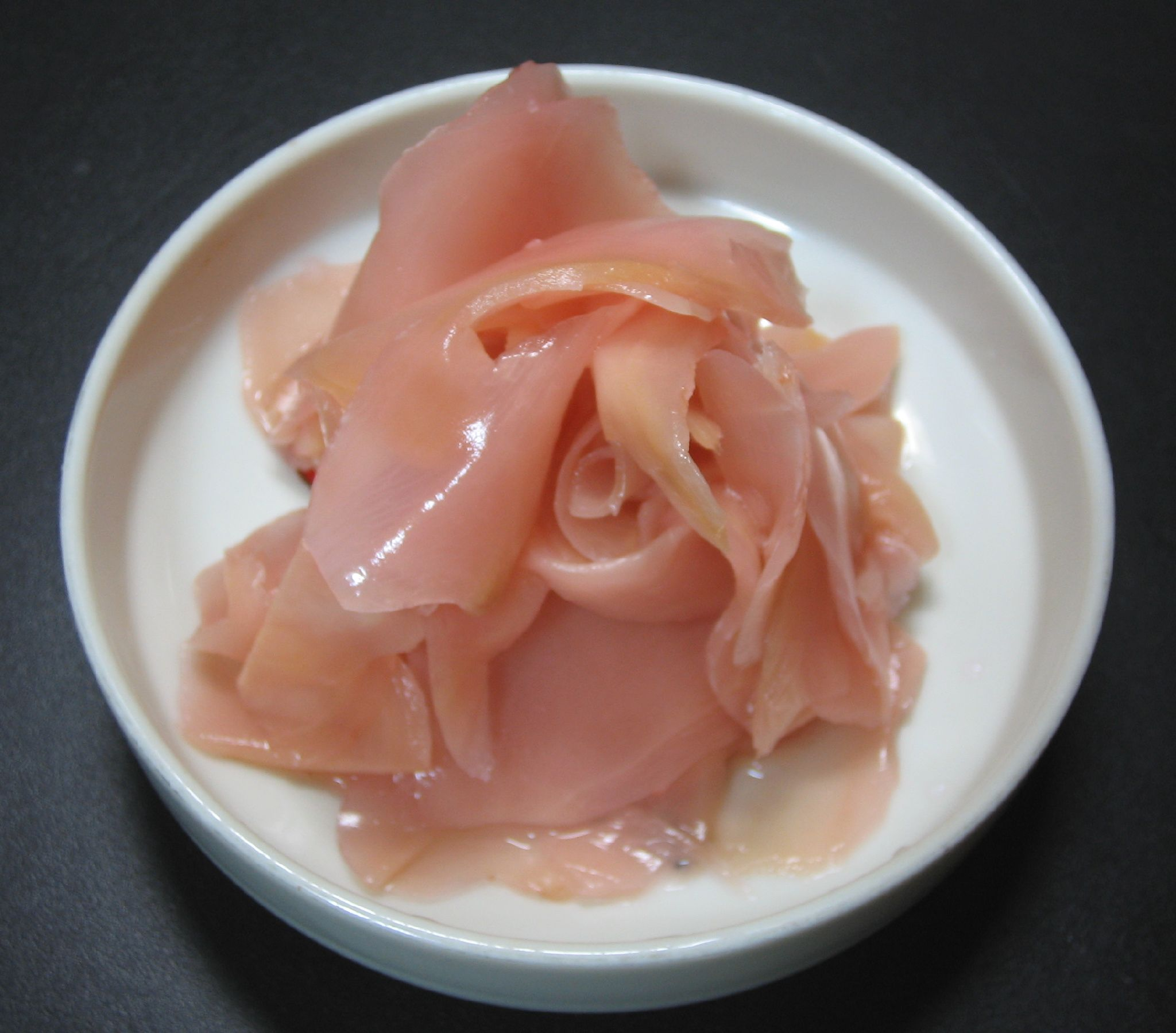
Gari (pickled ginger)

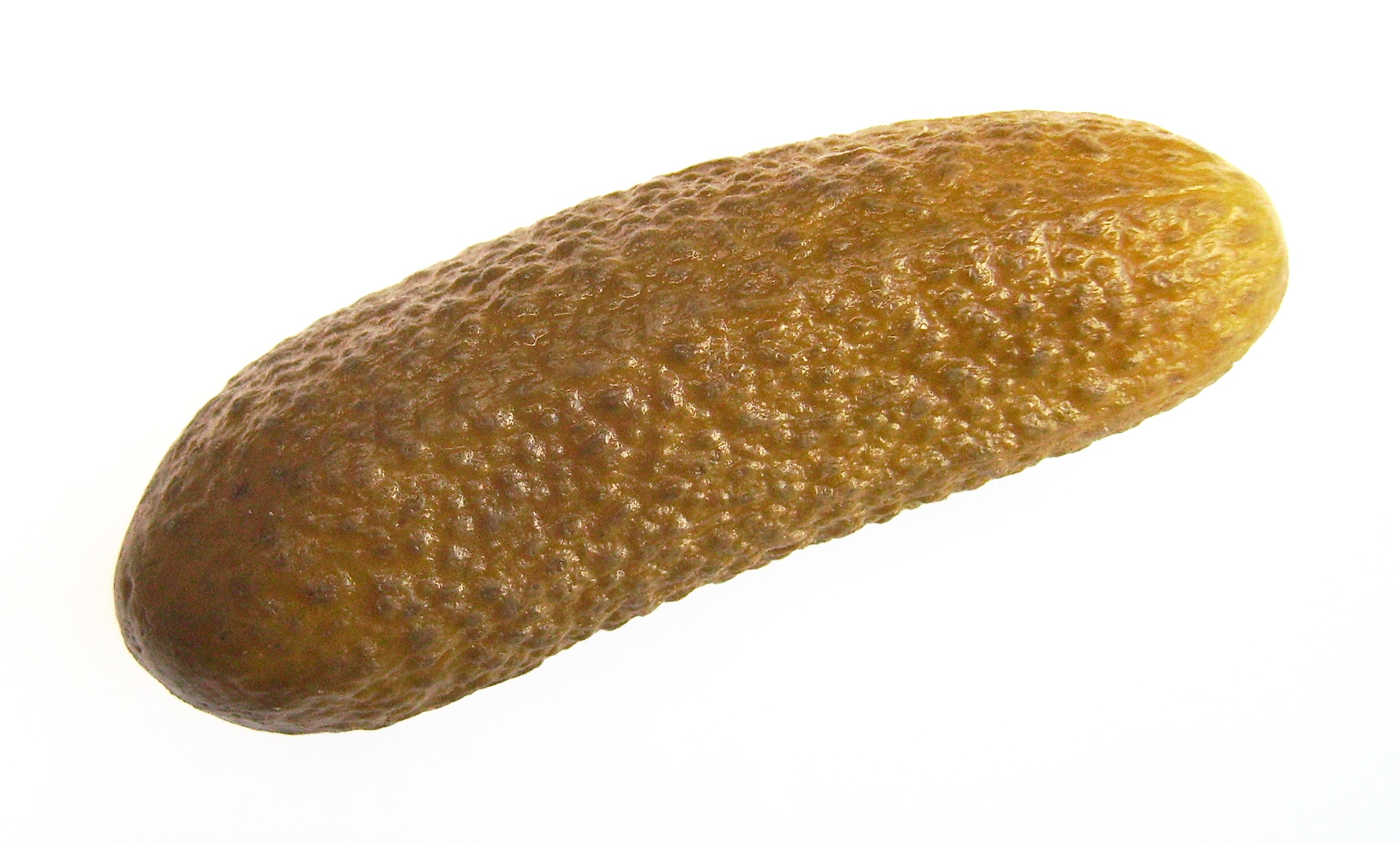
A pickled gherkin

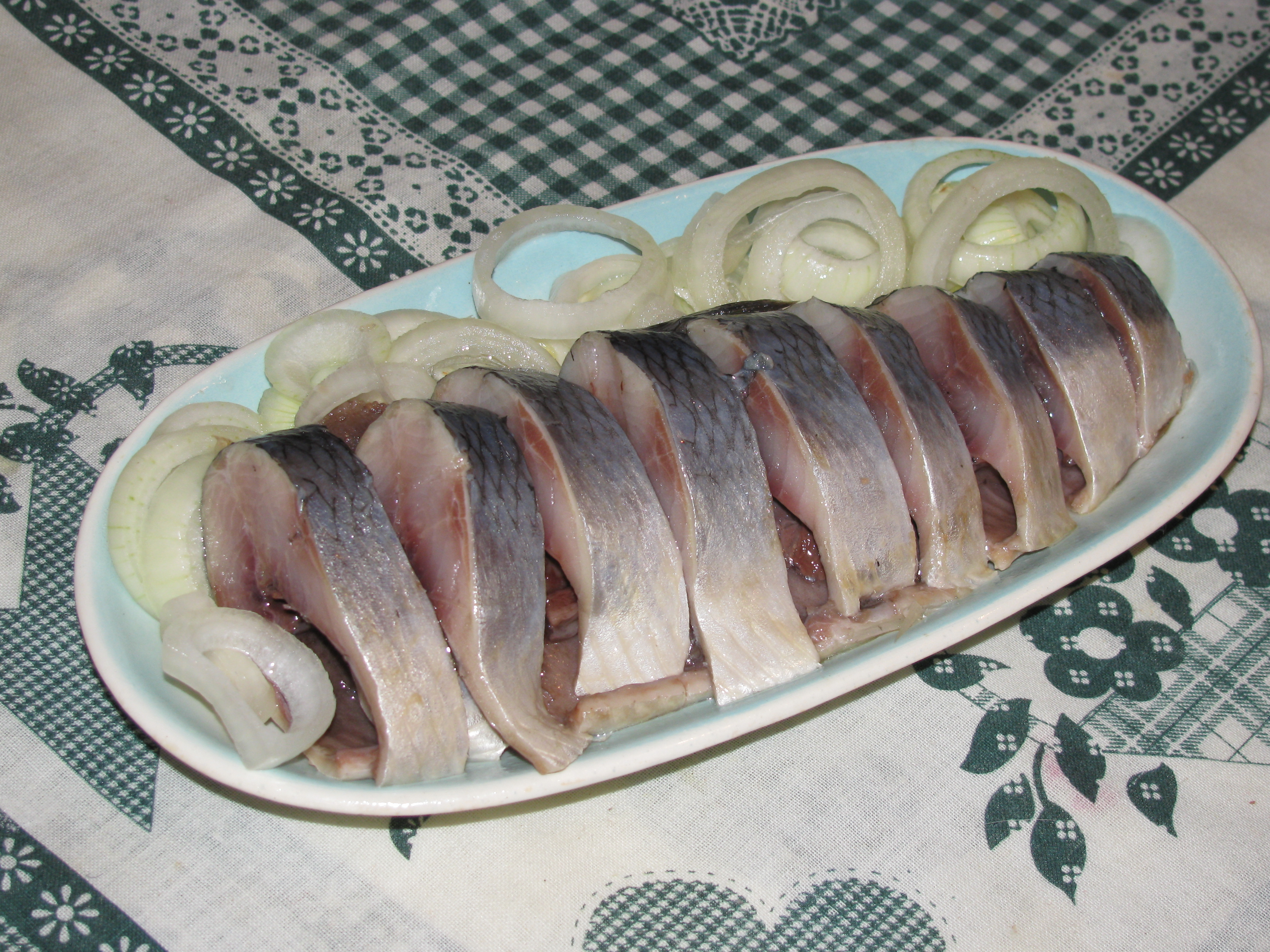
Pickled herring with onions

=== K ===
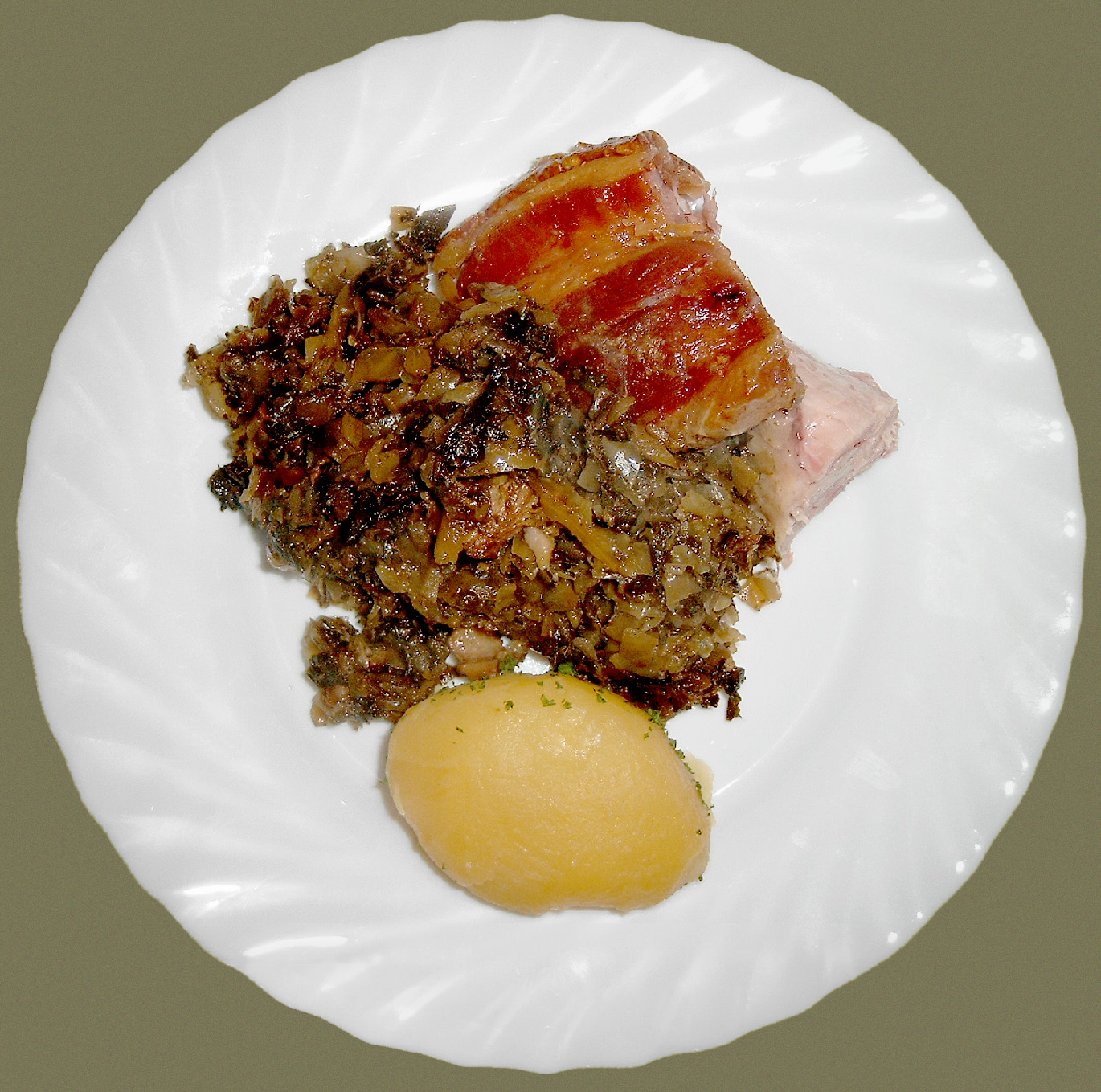
Knieperkohl (center), with kassler (cured pork) and potato

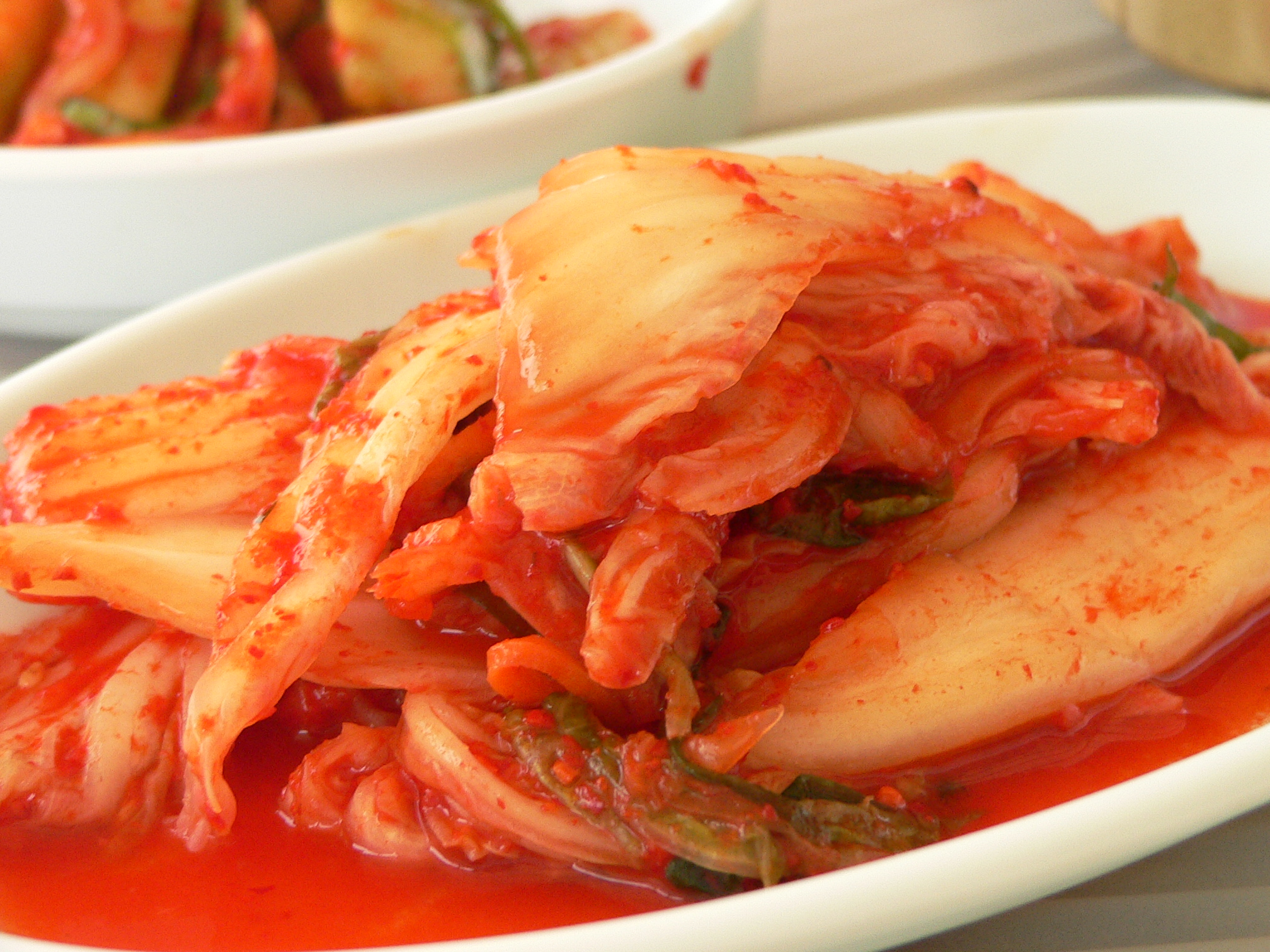
Kimchi

- Karashizuke – Type of Japanese pickled vegetable
- Kasuzuke – Japanese pickles using the lees from sake
- Kiamoy – Snack made from dried pickled fruit and anise
- Kimchi – Korean side dish of fermented vegetables

- Baek-kimchi – Kimchi made without the chili pepper powder
- Dongchimi – Short-maturing Korean vegetable pickle
- Kkakdugi – Kimchi variety made with diced radish
- Nabak-kimchi – Variant of the Korean dish kimchi
- Yeolmu-kimchi – Korean pickle of summer radish leaves

- Knieperkohl – Pickled cabbage dish similar to sauerkraut
- Kool-Aid pickles – Small pickled and fermented cucumber

=== L ===
- Lahpet – Burmese pickled tea
- Li hing mui – Salty dried Chinese plum
- Limes – Method of preserving the fruit of limes

=== M ===
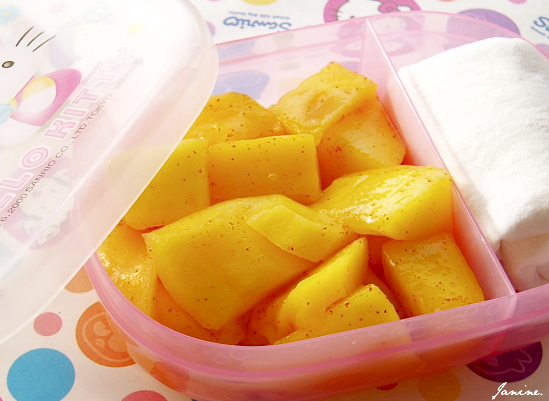
Pickled mango

- Mango pickle – Variety of pickles prepared using mango
- Matsumaezuke – Pickled dish from Matsumae, Hokkaidō, Japan
- Meigan cai – Type of dry pickled Chinese mustard
- Mixed pickle – Pickles made from a variety of vegetables mixed in the same pickling process
- Mohnyin tjin – Burmese fermented vegetables in rice wine
- Morkovcha – Koryo-saram spicy marinated carrot dish
- Murabba – Sweet fruit preserve
- Murături – Pickled vegetables of the Romanian cuisine
- Mussels – Bivalve mollusc
- Mustard – Popular salt-fermented dish in Hmong cuisine

=== N ===
- Nem chua – Vietnamese fermented pork dish
- Nozawana – Japanese leaf vegetable, often pickled
- Nukazuke – Japanese pickle made by fermenting vegetables in rice bran

=== O ===
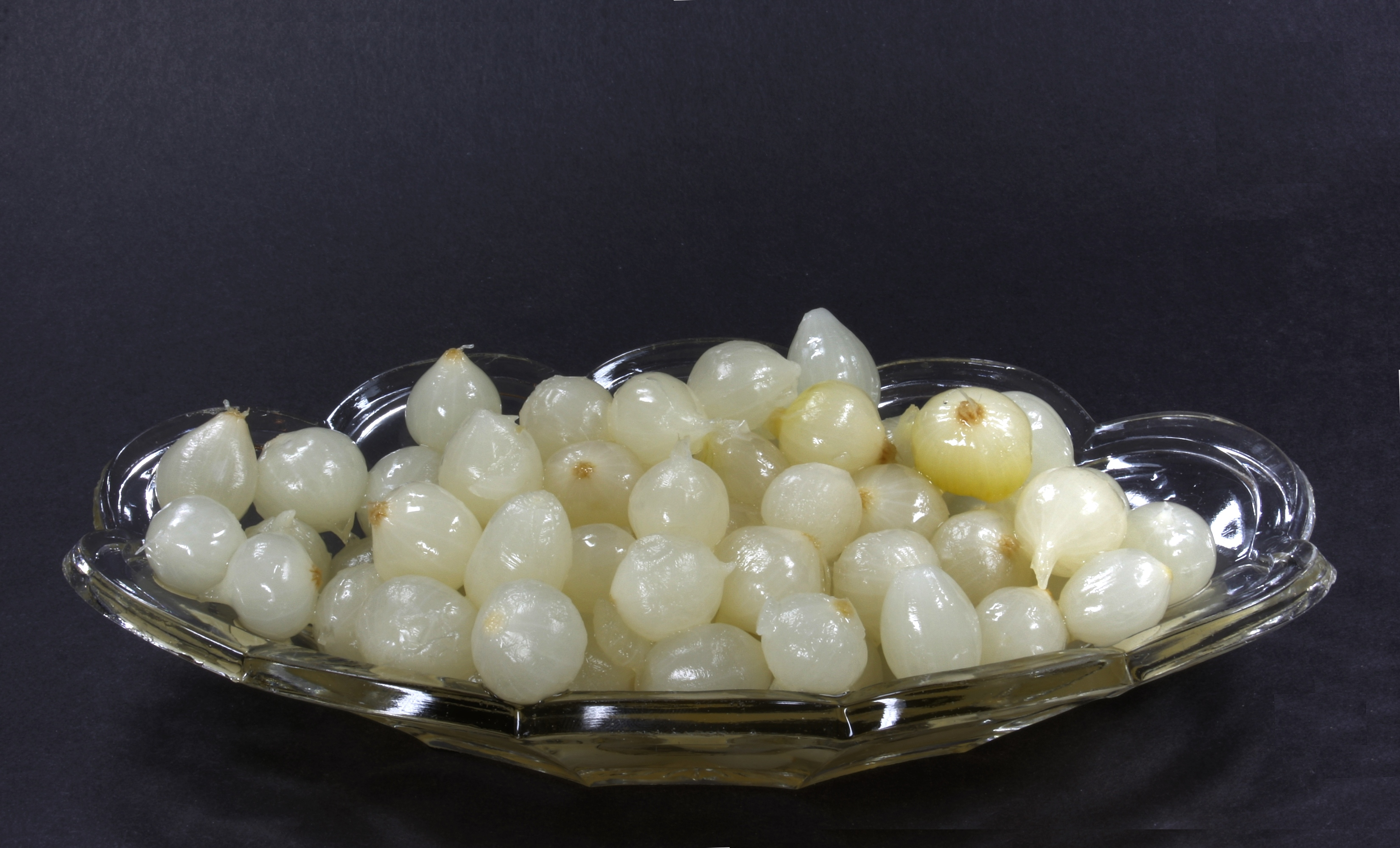
A dish of silverskin pickled onions

- Onions
- Oorgai – Pickled varieties of vegetable and fruit

=== P ===
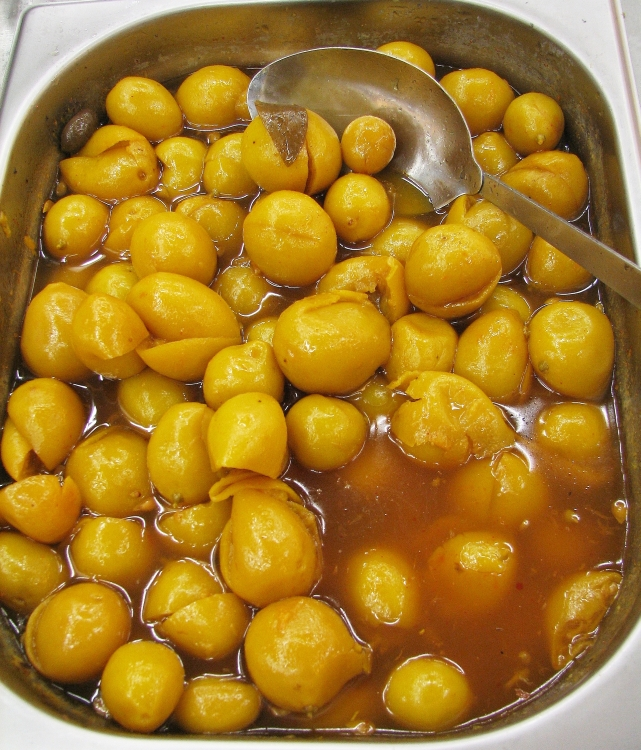
Pickled lemons

- Pachranga – Pickled varieties of vegetable and fruit
- Pao cai – Pickle in Chinese cuisine
- Peppadew – Brand name of a sweet and spicy pickled pepper grown in South Africa
- Piccalilli – British relish of chopped pickled vegetables and spices
- Pickle meat – Meat, typically offal, in vinegar – also referred to as pickled pork
- Pickled carrot – a carrot that has been pickled in a brine, vinegar, or other solution and left to ferment for a period of time
- Pickled cucumber – Small pickled and fermented cucumber
- Pickled onion – Onions pickled in a solution of vinegar or salt
- Pickled pepper – Capsicum pepper preserved by pickling
- Pickled pigs' feet – Meat, typically offal, in vinegar
- Pickled radish – Radish dish served with Korean fried chicken
- Pickling salt – Fine-grained salt used for manufacturing pickles
- Pikliz – Haitian condiment
- Prawn – Crustaceans used for culinary purposes
- Preserved lemon – Type of pickle
- Prune – Dried plum

=== R ===
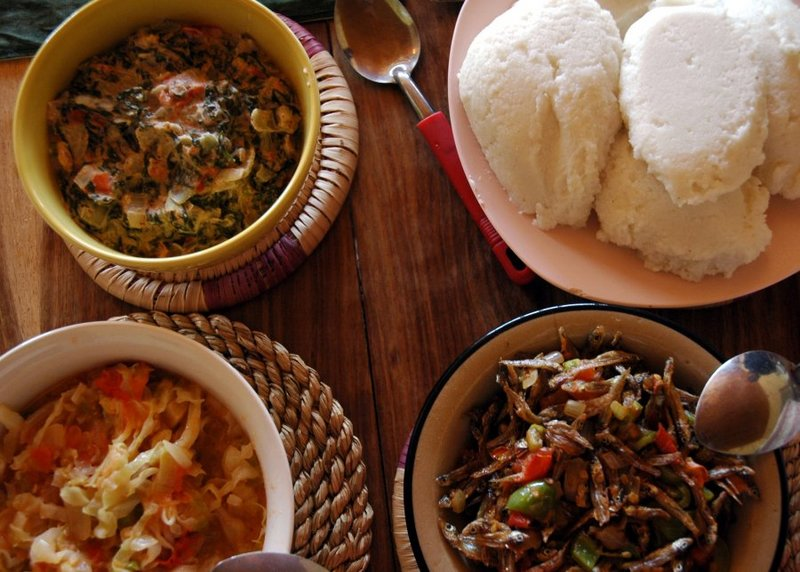
Three relishes here accompany Nshima (top right), a cornmeal product in African cuisine

- Radish – Root vegetable of the Brassicaceae family
- Relish – Condiment made from cooked pickled vegetables, fruit or herbs
- Rollmops – Pickled herring fillets

=== S ===
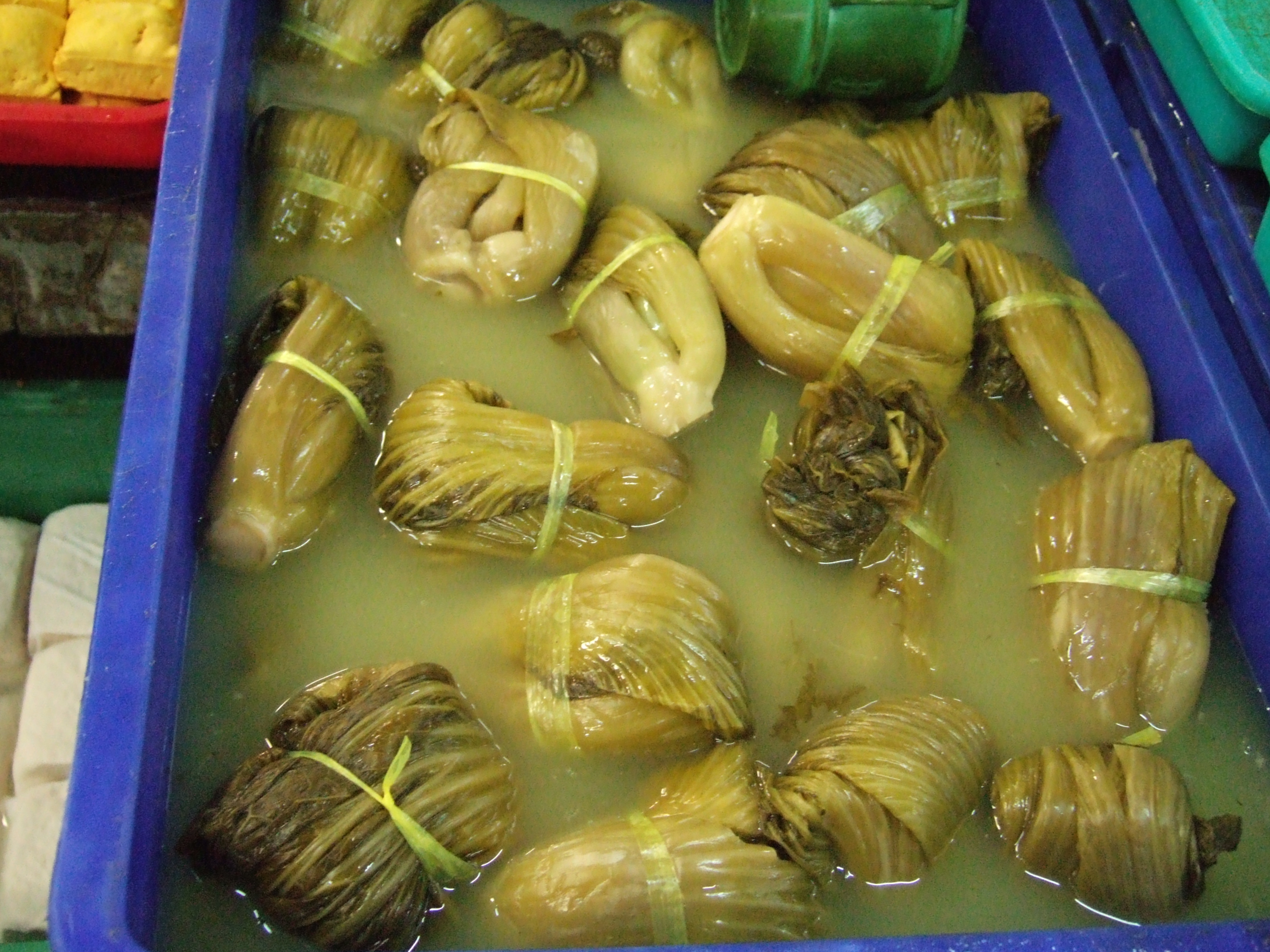
Suan cai

- Salmon – Commercially important migratory fish
- Salt pork – Salt-cured pork usually made from pork belly
- Salt-cured meat – Preservation of food using salt
- Sauerkraut – Finely sliced and fermented cabbage
- Sausage – Meat product
- Seaweed – Algae that can be used for culinary purposes
- Seer Torshi – Iranian pickled garlic condiment
- Shrimp – Crustaceans used for culinary purposes
- Sour cabbage – Fermented vegetable preserve
- Spanish pickle
- Spreewald gherkins – Specialty gherkin from Brandenburg
- Suan cai – Traditional Chinese pickled vegetables

=== T ===
- Takuan – Pickled preparation of daikon radish
- Three bean salad – Common cold salad composed of various cooked or pickled beans
- Tianjin preserved vegetable – Type of pickled Chinese cabbage from Tianjin, China
- Torshi, also known as Tursu – Procedure of preserving food in brine or vinegar
- Tsukemono – Japanese preserved vegetables
- Turnip – Type of root vegetable

=== U ===
- Umeboshi – Sour pickled Japanese fruit
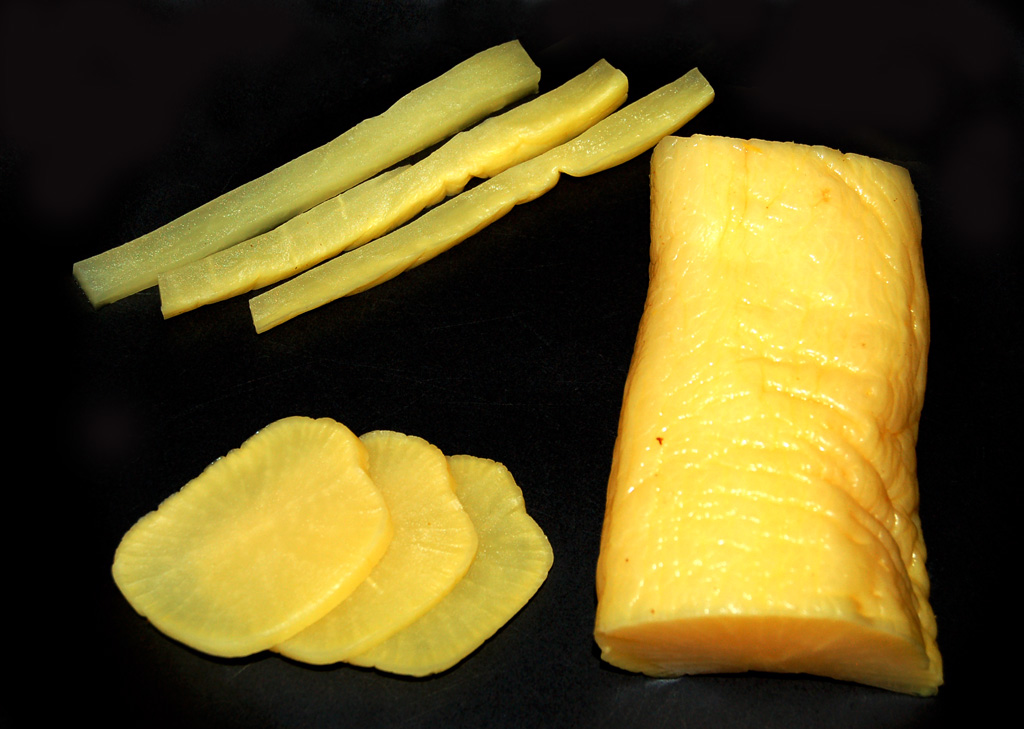
Takuan is pickled daikon radish.

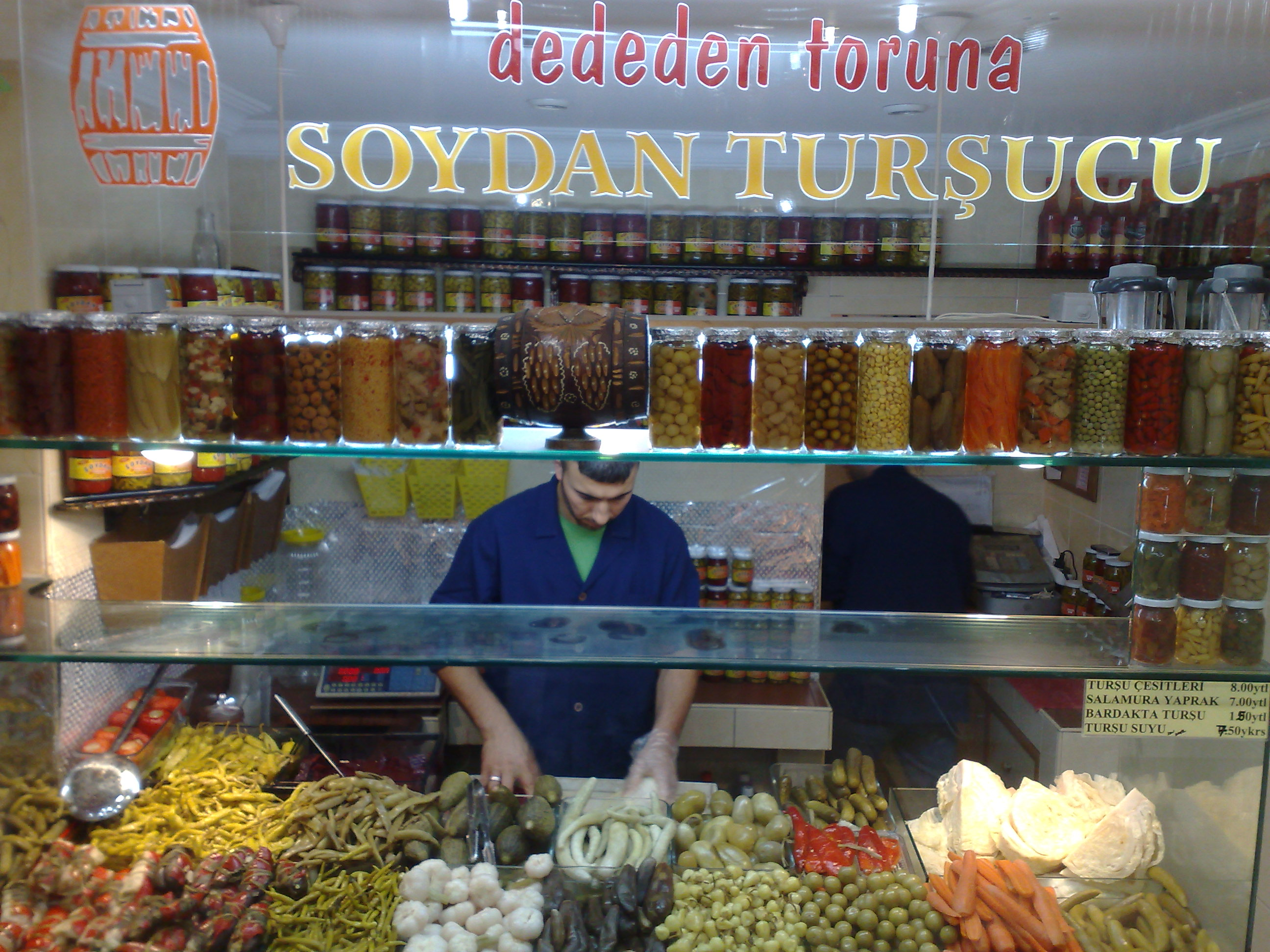
Tursu are the pickled vegetables of the cuisines of many Balkan and Middle East countries.

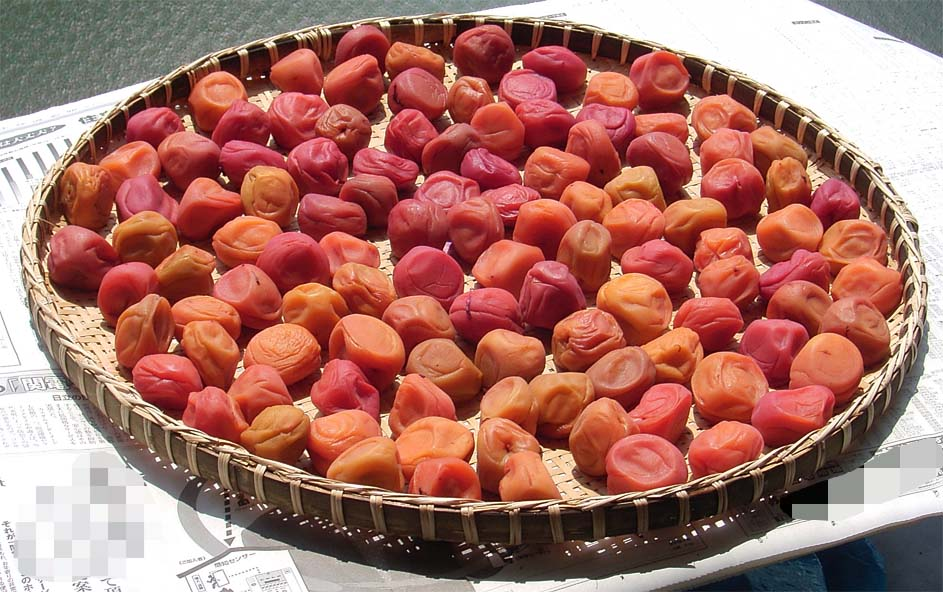
Umeboshi (pickled ume fruit) drying in the sun

=== W ===
- Walnuts – Traditional English pickle made from walnuts
- Watermelon rind – Plant with large fruit
- Whelks – Common name that is applied to various kinds of sea snail

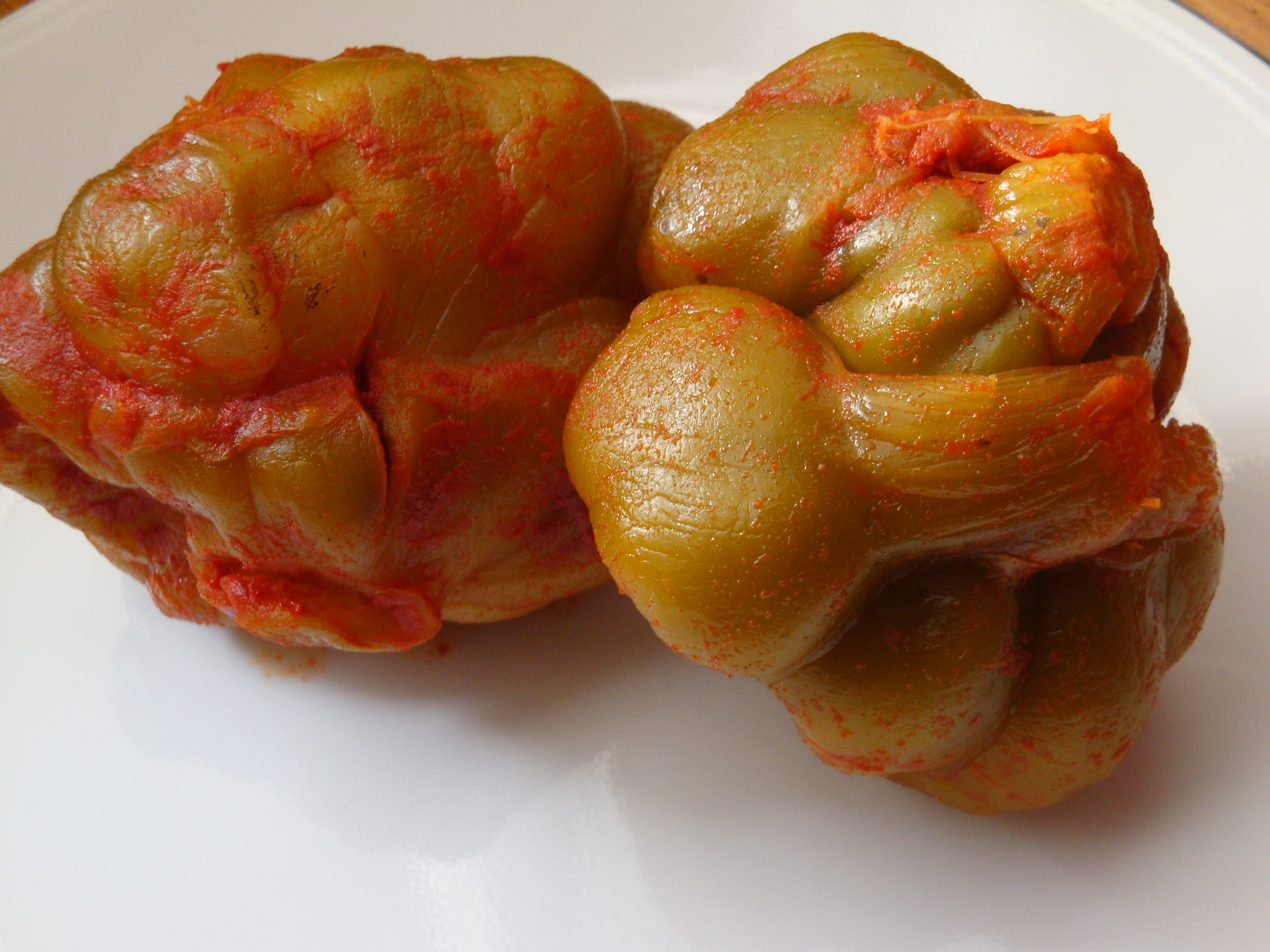
Zha cai is pickled mustard plant stem that originated from Sichuan, China.

=== Z ===
- Zha cai – Pickled mustard plant stem from Chongqing, China

== See also ==
- Condiment – Substance added to food for flavour
- List of chutneys – Chutney varieties
- List of condiments
- List of fermented foods
- List of Indian pickles
- List of kimchi varieties – Korean side dish of fermented vegetables
