= Pickled ginger =

Pickled ginger may refer to one of two types of ginger in Japanese cuisine:

- Gari, sweet, thinly sliced young ginger that is light pink in color and served with sushi
- Beni shōga, thin strips of red-colored ginger served with other dishes

== See also ==
- Ginger (disambiguation)
