= Ginger (name) =

Ginger is an English given name, nickname, and surname. As a diminutive of Virginia, the female variants of the name are Gingee, Gingie, Ginjer, Jinger, Gingerline.

== People with the given name ==
- Ginger Costa-Jackson (born 1986), American opera singer
- Ginger Gilmour (born 1949), American artist, former wife of Pink Floyd guitarist David Gilmour, born Virginia Hasenbein
- Ginger Helgeson-Nielsen (born 1968), American tennis player
- Ginger Huber, American diver, high diving silver medalist in the 2013 World Aquatics Championships
- Ginger Lynn (born 1962), American pornographic actress
- Ginger Molloy (born 1937), former Grand Prix motorcycle road racer from New Zealand
- Ginger Riley Munduwalawala (c. 1937–2002), Australian Aboriginal artist
- Ginger Pooley (born 1977), rock musician and singer formerly with The Smashing Pumpkins
- Ginger Stanley (1931–2023), American model, actress and stunt woman
- Ginger Strand, 21st century American essayist, novelist, environmental writer, and historian
- Ginger Brooks Takahashi (born 1977), American artist
- Ginger Williams (born 1953), Jamaican-born British lovers rock singer
- Ginger Zee, American meteorologist

== People with the nickname ==
- Ginger Baker (1939–2019), English drummer, founder of the rock band Cream
- Albert "Ginger" Baker (born c. 1951), Northern Irish former loyalist and ex-British Army soldier convicted of four murders
- Ginger Beaumont (1876–1956), Major League Baseball player
- William Boyle, 12th Earl of Cork (1873–1967), Royal Navy Admiral of the Fleet
- Ginger Colton (1875–c. 1946), Australian rugby union player
- Albert Goodwin (1887–1918), Canadian labour leader and union activist
- Ginger Crocker, American politician
- Geri "Ginger Spice" Halliwell (born 1972), British singer-songwriter and former member of the Spice Girls
- Ginger Johnson (1916–1975), Nigerian percussionist and bandleader in London
- Ginger Jones (1905–1986), Welsh boxer
- James Harry Lacey (1917–1989), Royal Air Force fighter ace
- Ginger Lees (1905–1982), British motorcycle speedway rider
- Ginger McCain (1930–2011), English National Hunt horse trainer
- Ginger Minj (born 1984), American drag queen and contestant on the RuPaul's Drag Race series.
- JJ "Ginger" O'Connell (1887–1944), member of the Irish Republican Army, general (later demoted to colonel) in the Irish Defence Forces
- W. G. Richardson (1909–1959), English footballer
- Ginger Rogers (1911–1995), American actress, dancer, and singer.
- Ginger Shinault (1892–1930), American Major League Baseball player
- Ginger Smock (1920–1995), American violinist, orchestra leader and local Los Angeles television personality
- James Williams (Welsh footballer) (c. 1886–1916), Welsh footballer

== People with the surname ==
- Ann Fagan Ginger (1925–2025), American lawyer, teacher, writer and political activist
- George Ginger (1863–1938), British philatelist (stamp collector)
- Phyllis Ginger (1907–2005), British artist
- Ray Ginger (1924–1975), American historian, author, and biographer, husband of Ann Fagan Ginger
- Sergei Ginger (1870–1937), Moldovan architect

== Fictional characters with the given name ==
- Ginger Foutley, in the Nickelodeon animated television series As Told by Ginger
- Ginger Grant, in the 1960s television series Gilligan's Island
- Ginger Meggs, in the Australian comic of the same name
- Ginger (comics), in The Beezer

== See also ==
- Ginger (disambiguation)
