= Seer torshi =

Iranian pickled garlic condiment

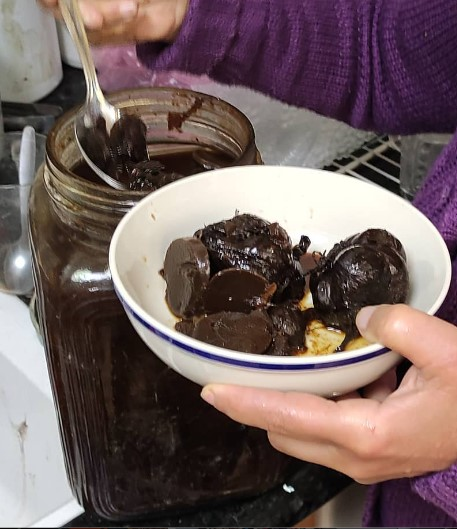
- Seer torshi aged for more than 20 years
- Alternative names: Sir torshi
- Type: Pickle
- Course: Condiment, side dish
- Place of origin: Iran
- Associated cuisine: Iranian cuisine
- Serving temperature: Cold or at room temperature
- Main ingredients: Garlic, vinegar, salt

Seer torshi (also spelled sir torshi; Persian: سیر ترشی, lit. 'garlic pickle') is an Iranian vinegar pickle made by preserving whole garlic bulbs or cloves in vinegar and salt for a long time. A traditional preparation is included in Najaf Daryabandari and Fahimeh Rastkar's comprehensive two-volume Persian cookbook Ketab-e Mostatab-e Ashpazi, az Sir ta Piaz.

The condiment is especially associated with northern Iranian cuisine, including Gilan. Long-aged versions are highly valued, and seer torshi matured for about seven years is especially prized for its dark colour, soft texture and sweet, mellow flavour.

== Preparation ==
In the traditional method, sound garlic bulbs are cleaned while being kept whole. Loose outer skin, roots and damaged portions are removed. The garlic is washed, dried thoroughly and packed into a clean glass container with salt. Enough vinegar is added to keep the bulbs completely submerged. Red grape vinegar is commonly used, although white, apple and date vinegars also appear in modern preparations.

The sealed container is stored away from direct sunlight. The pickle may be eaten after several months, but its colour, texture and flavour continue to change during prolonged storage. Vinegar supplies the acidity in the traditional preparation; it does not require a starter culture or microbial production of acid. Pickled-garlic products made by deliberate fermentation also exist, but constitute a different processing method.

== Ageing process ==
During long storage, the cloves gradually soften, lose much of their sharp pungency and change from white or ivory to shades of brown. Their flavour becomes milder and sweeter. These changes become more pronounced as the storage period increases, contributing to the special status given to seven-year-matured seer torshi.

Garlic fructans are hydrolysed during storage in acidified pickled garlic. This breakdown increases the availability of smaller carbohydrates, including fructose and glucose, and may contribute to the increasing sweetness of the cloves. Processing and room-temperature storage also decrease several γ-glutamyl peptides and S-alk(en)yl-L-cysteine sulfoxides, while increasing S-allylcysteine. These changes alter the pungent organosulfur profile of the garlic.

The soft, dark and sweet character of old seer torshi has some sensory similarity to black garlic, but the processing conditions differ. Black garlic is held for several weeks at controlled high temperature and humidity, whereas traditional seer torshi is immersed in acidic vinegar and aged at a much lower temperature for months or years. In black garlic, thermal processing reduces fructan content, increases water-soluble sugars and produces Amadori and Heyns compounds, which are intermediates of the Maillard reaction between reducing sugars and amino acids.

Fructan breakdown may therefore occur in both products, but the role of the Maillard reaction in multi-year seer torshi has not been directly established. Heat strongly promotes Maillard chemistry, while acidic conditions decrease the rate of its initial reactions. The browning of traditionally aged seer torshi may involve several processes, including slow non-enzymatic reactions, acid-driven chemical changes and pigments extracted from coloured vinegar.

== Accelerated and commercial methods ==
Accelerated preparations heat garlic in vinegar to soften the cloves and produce a browner appearance in a shorter period. This technique is used in industrial production when multi-year storage is impractical. Some industrial products are instead left unheated or receive only sufficient heat for pasteurisation.

Modern shortcut recipes may boil garlic in vinegar for several minutes to about half an hour. Grape syrup, date syrup, pomegranate molasses, caramelised sugar, balsamic vinegar, date vinegar or soy sauce may be added to increase sweetness and darken the product. Such preparations imitate the softness, sweetness and colour of aged seer torshi but do not reproduce several years of the same ageing process.

Heating progressively inactivates alliinase and decreases allicin, altering the enzymatic and pungent sulfur chemistry of the garlic.

== Serving ==
Seer torshi is served cold or at room temperature alongside rice dishes, stews, grilled foods and fish. It is also served with fish during Nowruz.

== See also ==
- Torshi
- Black garlic
- Laba Garlic
- List of pickled foods
