= Chow-chow (food) =

Pickled relish

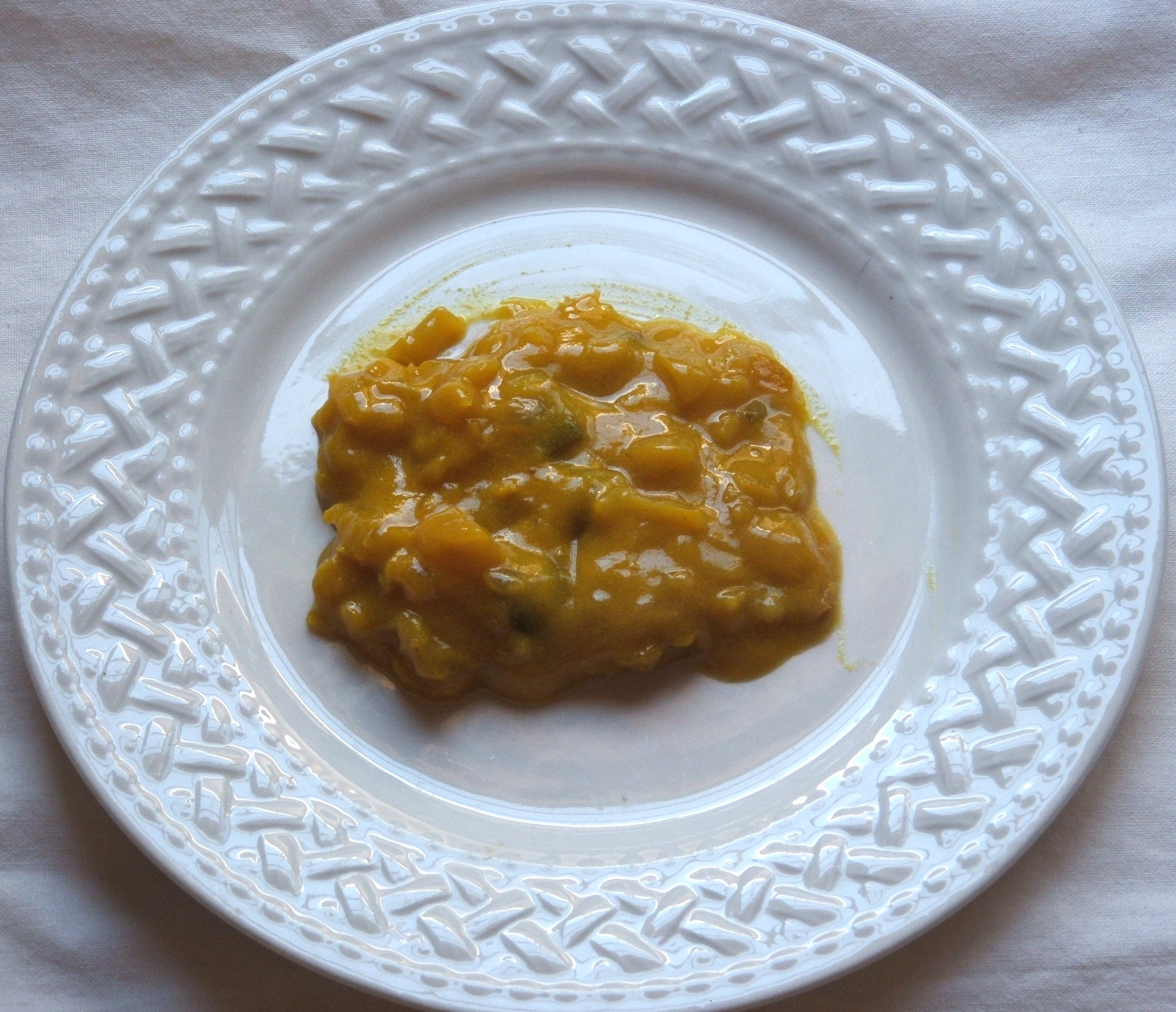
Chow-chow

Chow-chow (also spelled chowchow or chow chow) is a pickled dish popular in North America whose origins are unclear. Some suggest an origin in the American South, while other sources suggest it originated in Canada and was brought south by the Acadians who migrated to the American South after being expelled from the Maritimes in the mid-1700s; another theory is that it originated from Chinese railway workers.

== History ==
Made primarily of chopped green tomatoes, onions, cabbage, and seasonal peppers (though carrots, cauliflower, beans, and peas are sometimes included), chow-chow is a pickled relish eaten by itself or as a condiment on fish cakes, mashed potatoes, biscuits and gravy, pinto beans, hot dogs, hamburgers and other foods.

== Preparation ==
An early 20th-century American recipe for chow chow was made with cucumbers, onions, cauliflower and green peppers left overnight in brine, boiled in (cider) vinegar with whole mustard seed and celery seeds, then mashed into a paste with mustard, flour and turmeric.

== Regional variations ==
Its ingredients vary considerably, depending on whether it is the "Northern" (primarily Pennsylvanian) or "Southern" variety, as well as separate Canadian variety, prevalent in the Maritimes where it is called "chow." The former is made from a combination of vegetables, mainly green and red tomatoes, onions, carrots, beans of various types, asparagus, cauliflower and peas. The latter is entirely or almost entirely green tomatoes or cabbage. These ingredients are pickled in a canning jar. After preserving, chow-chow is served cold, often as a condiment or relish.

== See also ==
- Mixed pickle – Pickles made from a variety of vegetables mixed in the same pickling process
- Chutney – South Asian condiment
- Piccalilli – British relish of chopped pickled vegetables and spices
- Branston pickle – British food brand known for its pickled chutney
- South Asian pickles – Pickled varieties of vegetable and fruit
- Giardiniera – Italian relish of pickled vegetables in vinegar or oil
- List of pickled foods
