= Knieperkohl =

Pickled cabbage dish similar to sauerkraut

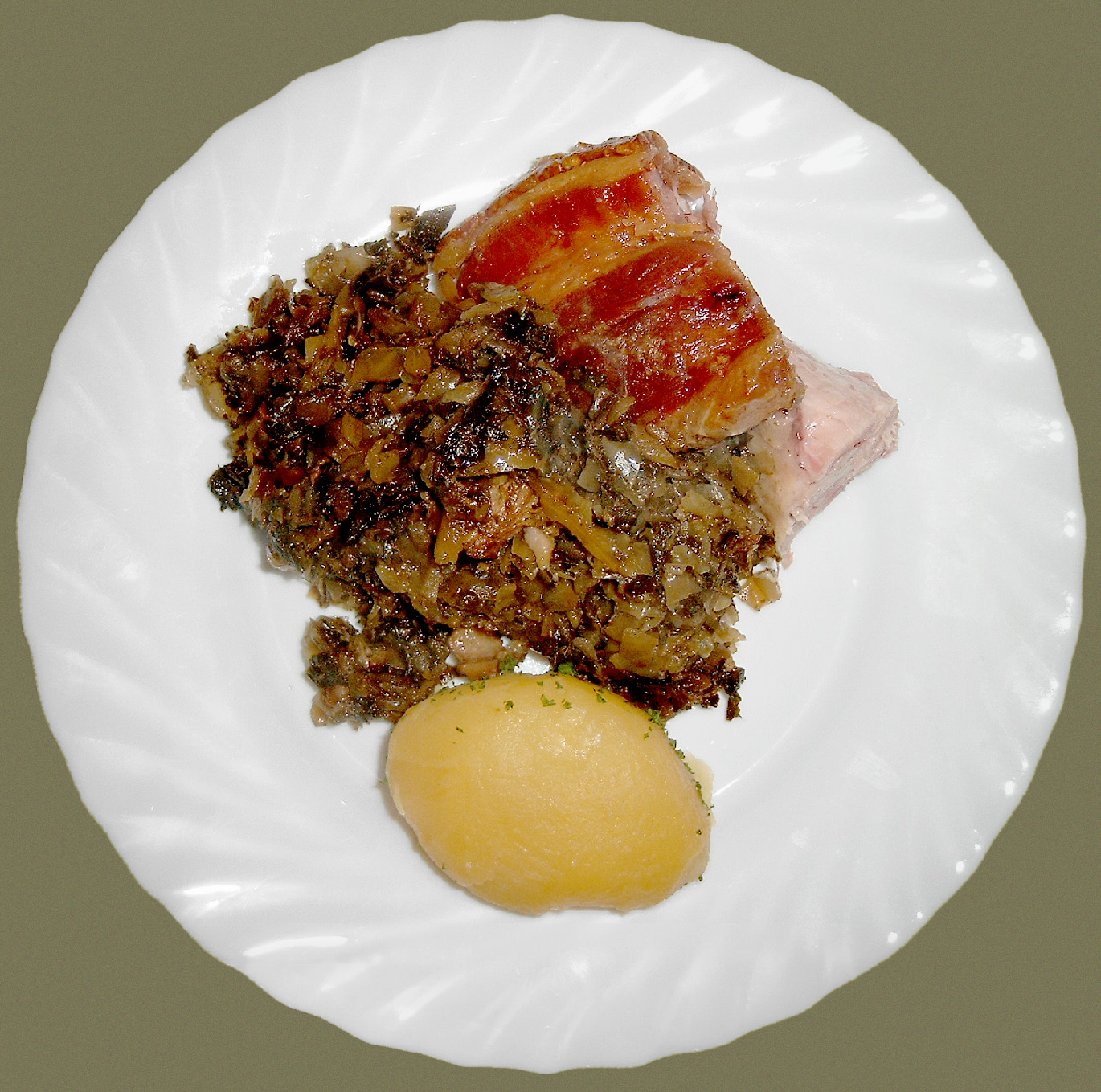
- Knieperkohl served with Kassler (cured pork) and Pellkartoffel (potato cooked in its skin)
- Type: pickle
- Place of origin: Germany
- Region or state: Prignitz, Brandenburg
- Associated cuisine: German cuisine
- Main ingredients: white cabbage; kale; collard greens
- Ingredients generally used: grape leaves; cherry leaves
- Similar dishes: sauerkraut; curtido; kimchi

Knieperkohl is a pickled cabbage dish similar to sauerkraut. It contains not only white cabbage but also collard greens (or leaves of red cabbage) and kale, as well as grape leaf and cherry leaf. Knieperkohl is considered a representative dish of the historical region of Prignitz, now part of Brandenburg in Germany.

Knieperkohl is commonly served as an accompaniment to cured pork, such as Kassler, or sausages. Kohlwurst is a type of German sausage generally eaten with Knieperkohl. Potatoes are another typical accompaniment.

== See also ==
- Brandenburg cuisine – Culinary traditions of Brandenburg, Germany
- List of cabbage dishes
- List of pickled foods
