= Ginger (disambiguation) =

Ginger is a plant.

Ginger may also refer to:

== Arts and entertainment ==
=== Film ===
- Ginger (1935 film), an American comedy film
- Ginger (1946 film), an American drama film by Oliver Drake
- Ginger (1971 film), an American action film
- Ginger (2013 film), an Indian film

=== Literature ===
- Ginger (book), a children's picture book by Charlotte Voake
- Ginger: The Life and Death of Albert Goodwin, a 1990 book by Susan Mayse

=== Music ===
- Ginger (band), a 1990s Canadian rock band, and their 1993 album
- Ginger (Brockhampton album) (2019)
- Ginger (Speedy J album) (1993)
- Ginger, a 1987 album by The Figgs
- "Ginger", a 1997 song by David Devant & His Spirit Wife
- "Ginger", a song by Irving Berlin
- "Ginger", a song by Wizkid featuring Burna Boy from the 2020 album Made in Lagos

== Businesses ==
- Ginger Hotels, a chain of hotels across India
- Ginger Productions, a television production company
- Ginger Software, an Israeli company, providing software for grammar and spelling correction

== Places ==
- Ginger Island, part of the British Virgin Islands
- Ginger Islands, Antarctica

== Other uses ==
- Ginger (name), a list of people and fictional characters with the given name, nickname, or surname
- Ginger, a slang term for a person with red hair
- Hurricane Ginger, a 1971 Atlantic hurricane
- Ginger, code name for the Segway PT
- Ginger, a nickname of the first of the Egyptian Gebelein predynastic mummies

== See also ==
- Ginger Collection, a collection of philatelic material
- Ginger Group, a faction of Canadian Members of Parliament
- Ginger Group (Queensland), a group of Liberal Party of Australia MLAs
- Gingering, a horse-keeping practice
- Jinjer, a Ukrainian metalcore band
