= Pickled carrot =

Carrot pickled in brine, vinegar, or other solution

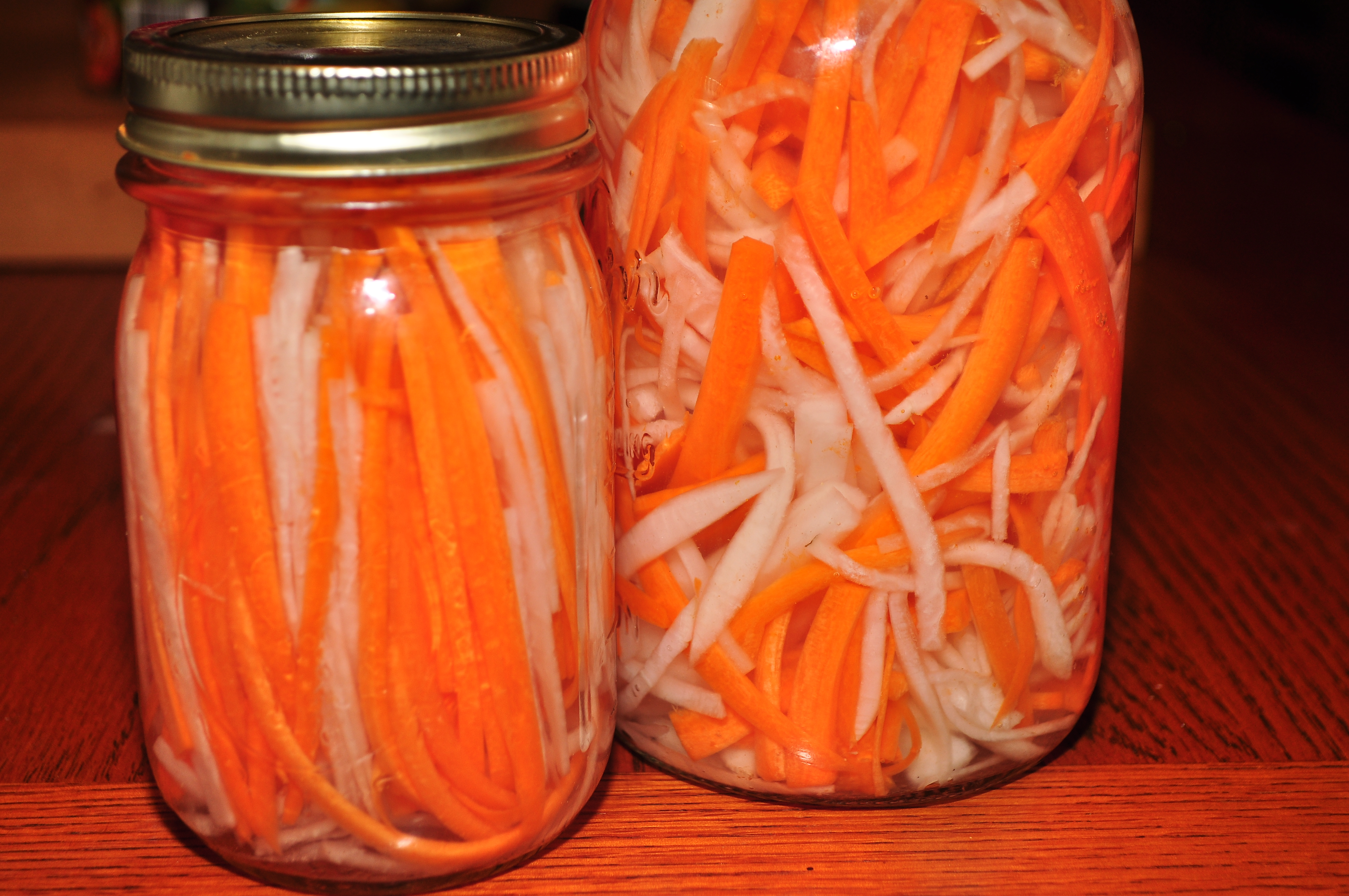
Jars of pickled carrots and daikon

A pickled carrot is a carrot that has been pickled in a brine, vinegar, or other solution and left to ferment for a period of time, by either immersing the carrots in an acidic solution or through souring by lacto-fermentation. Pickled carrots are often served with Vietnamese cuisine including bánh mì or as a component in an appetizer.

== Common variations ==
In Mexico, pickled carrots are known as escabeche carrots. This variation is usually pickled in vinegar with onions, peppers, and spices. They maintain a crunchy, carrot texture with flavors of peppers and other seasonings. These spicy, pickled vegetables are traditionally served with a meal.

In Vietnamese culture, pickled carrots are served alongside appetizers including Vietnamese egg rolls, or as an ingredient in recipes such as bánh mì and various soups. In Vietnamese-American markets, pickled carrot and daikon are available to buy in bulk, and in Vietnam, the two pickled vegetables are sold by wet market vendors in small plastic bags. They are not canned and should be refrigerated, although they may last for long amounts of time in the refrigerator.

Japanese cuisine may use pickled carrots alongside many traditional Japanese meals. Pickled fruits and vegetables (tsukemono) are a quintessential part of the Japanese diet. Pickling in Japan has taken place since before refrigeration, so tsukemono such as pickled carrots was made to last long amounts of time. The different methods used to make tsukemono vary from simple salting or vinegar brining, to other various processes involving cultured molds and fermentation. A common method of pickling carrots is called misozuke. Misozuke pickles are made by covering vegetables in miso so give them the salty, miso flavor. Alternatively, pickled carrots may be prepared in the nukazuke fashion — fermented in a mixture of roasted rice bran, salt, konbu, and other ingredients. Nukazuke pickled carrots are usually served alongside set meals.

In India, traditional pickled carrots are known as gajar nu athanu. They are pickled with skinned mustard seeds for flavor and heat, and served alongside meals. These are more quickly prepared and ready to eat within 24 hours.

Variations of pickled carrots are found all over the world. Pickling has been practiced for centuries and carrots used as seeds, wild roots, and medicine (although the purple variation was domesticated in Central Asia ca. 900 CE), can be traced as far back as 200 BC.

== See also ==
- List of pickled foods
- Encurtido – a pickled vegetable dish used as an appetizer, side dish and condiment in the Mesoamerican region
