= Mixed pickle =

Pickles made from a variety of vegetables mixed in the same pickling process

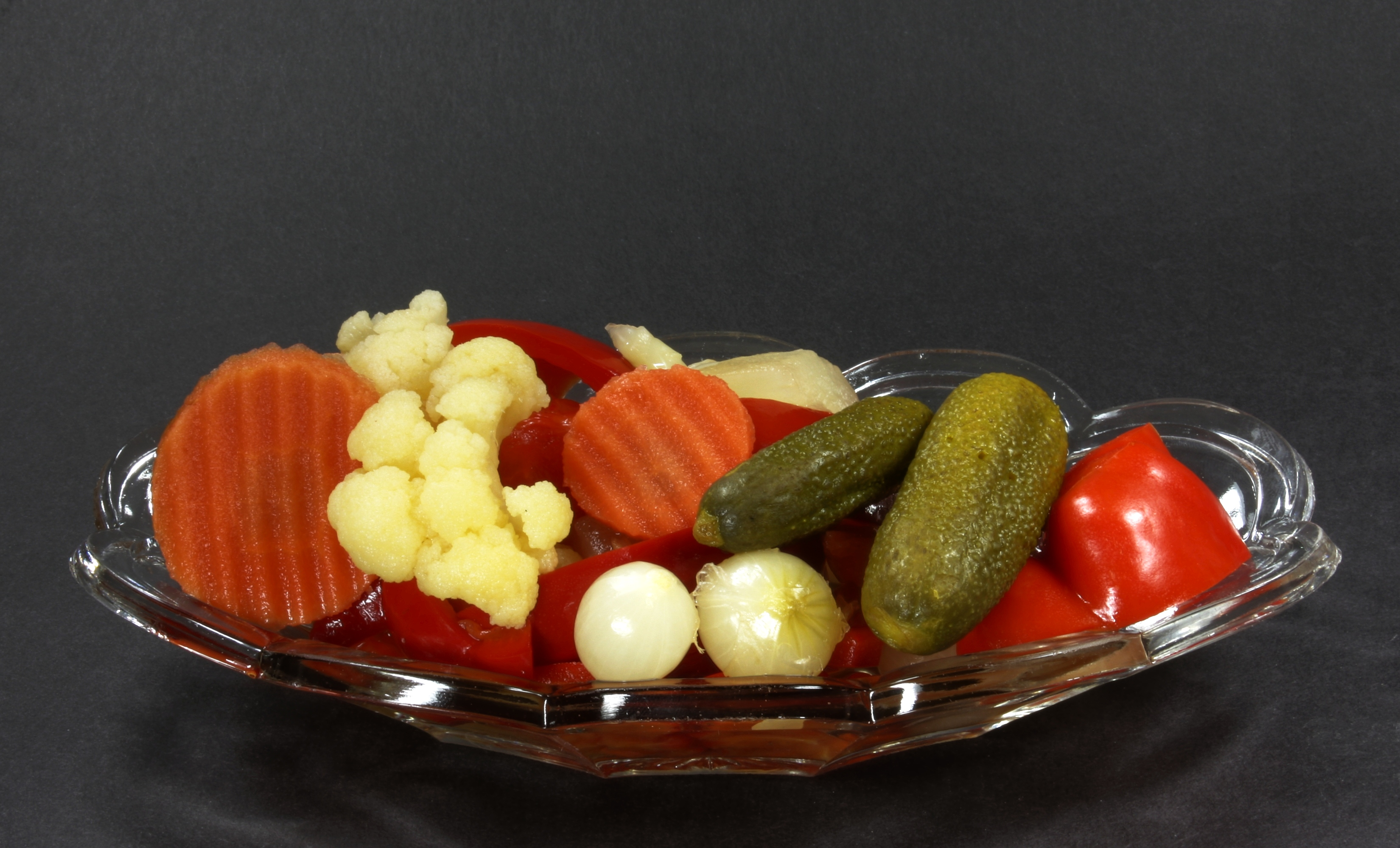
A plate of mixed pickles

Mixed pickles are pickles made from a variety of vegetables mixed in the same pickling process. Mixed pickles are eaten much like other pickles: in small amounts to add flavor and to accent a meal. Mixed pickles appear in many different world cuisines.

== In other countries ==
In American cuisine, a mixed pickle consists of vegetables and botanical fruits, typically including cucumbers, cauliflower, cut large onions, and bell peppers, as well as spices like garlic, dill, allspice, and chili peppers, suspended in vinegar. Mixed pickles may also be categorized as sweet or sour depending on the addition of a sweetening agent like sugar.

In British cuisine, mixed pickles typically include small whole onions, gherkins, and cauliflower. Some specific kinds of British mixed pickle are Branston pickle, which is a more relish-like variety, and piccalilli, which can also be found in American cuisine.

In Indian cuisine, a mixed pickle is more likely to contain fruits (for example, mangos and limes) as well as vegetables. Indian pickles are prepared using cooking oil unlike Western pickles, and are more likely to use lemon juice or other acids as a souring agent instead of vinegar. Spices and ingredients vary from region to region.

Recipes for mixed pickles can also be found in Chinese cuisine, Middle Eastern cuisine, and many other world cuisines.

== See also ==
- Chow-chow – Pickled relish
- Chutney – South Asian condiment
- Giardiniera – Italian relish of pickled vegetables in vinegar or oil
- South Asian pickle – Pickled varieties of vegetable and fruit
