= Encurtido =

Pickled vegetable dish from Central America

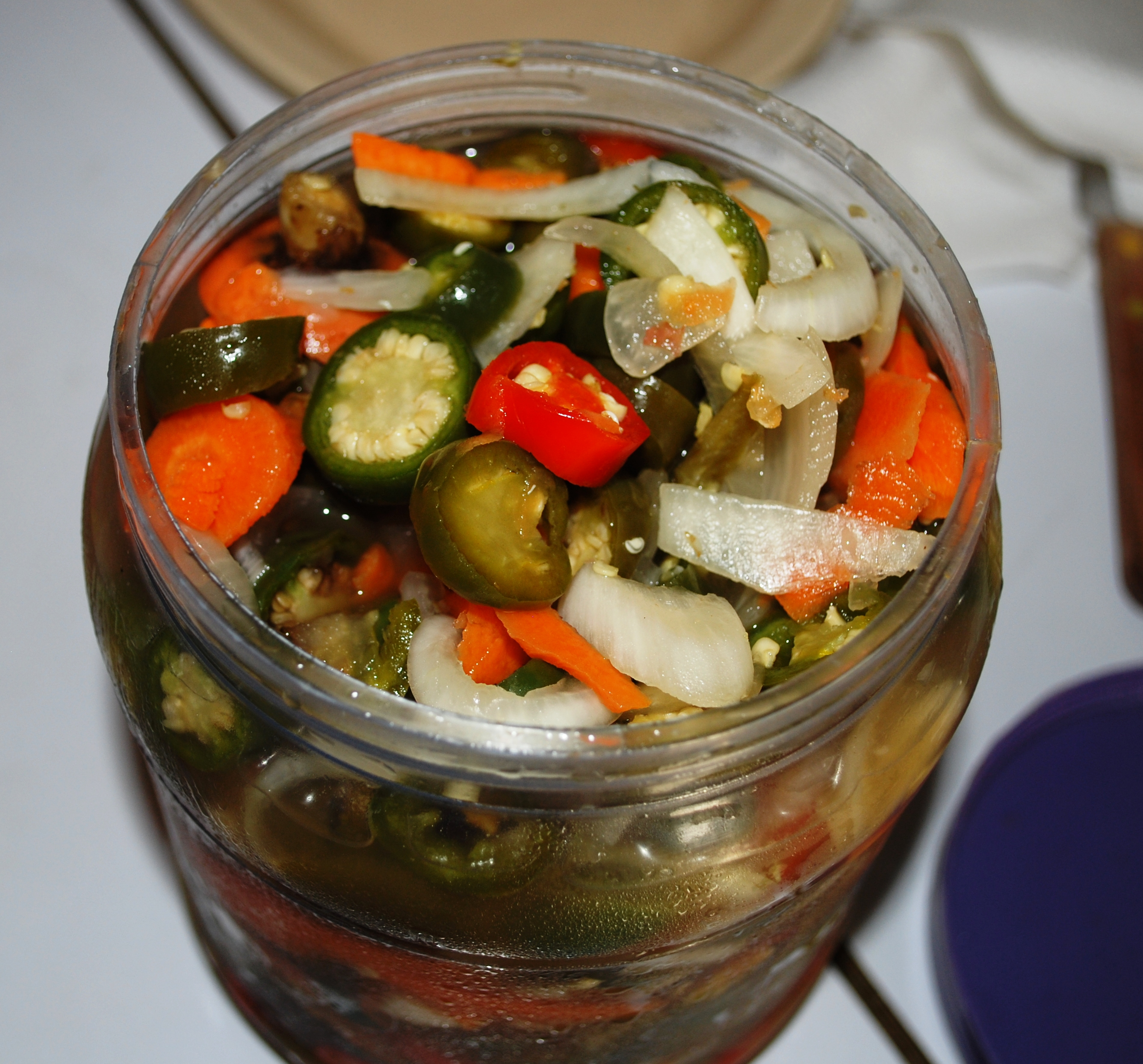
Encurtido in Honduras, prepared with red chili peppers, jalapeño peppers, carrot and onion

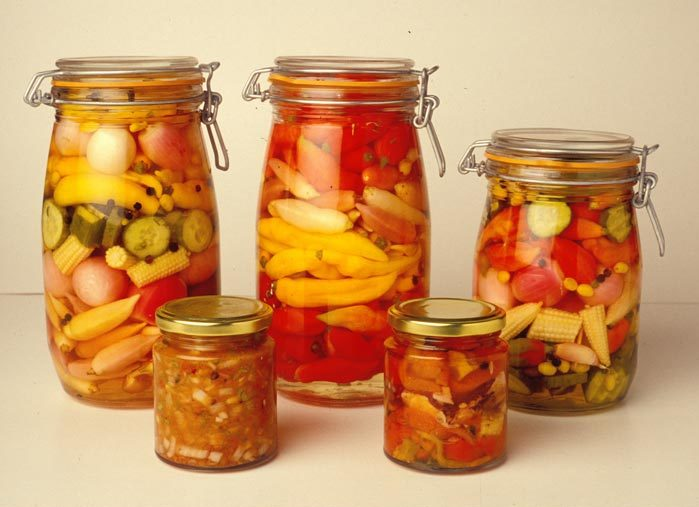
Various jarred encurtidos

Encurtido is a pickled appetizer, side dish and condiment in the Mesoamerican region. It consists of various vegetables, such as onion, peppers such as jalapeño, carrot and beets, among others, pickled in vinegar brine and typically prepared so the vegetables remain crunchy and firm to the bite. When used as a condiment, it is added to various dishes to add flavor. It is typically served cold.

Encurtido is a common dish in Honduran cuisine, and is sometimes used to add spiciness to various foods. It is also a common condiment "throughout coastal Central America" that is used as an "all-purpose" sauce in these areas. It is also commonly used in Mexican cuisine and Mexican-American cuisine as a table condiment. In the United States and other areas, mass-produced jarred or canned encurtido consisting of chili peppers, carrot and onion is sold in Mexican markets.

It is a relatively simple dish to prepare, in which denser vegetables such as carrots and beets are gently boiled or simmered in water until slightly softened, and then these and other softer vegetables such as onions, which do not require pre-cooking, are added to a boiling vinegar brine.

In Honduras, encurtido has been imported since at least 1898.

== See also ==
- Atchara – Filpino unripe papaya pickle
- Curtido – a lightly fermented cabbage relish
- Torshi – Procedure of preserving food in brine or vinegar
- Giardiniera – an Italian relish of pickled vegetables in vinegar or oil
- List of pickled foods
- Pickled carrot
