= Ginger Collection =

Australian collection of philatelic material

The Ginger Collection is a collection of philatelic material relating to Victoria for the period 1850 to 1883. It was formed by George Ginger and transferred from The Manchester Museum, The University of Manchester in 2006. The collection forms part of the British Library Philatelic Collections.

== See also ==
- Postage stamps and postal history of Victoria
