= Ginger Software =

American-Israeli software startup

- Industry: Software
- Founded: 2008
- Headquarters: Lexington, United States
- Key people: Yael Karov (Founder); Alex Ben-Ari (Vice President, R&D)
- Website: http://www.gingersoftware.com

Ginger Software is an American and Israeli start-up specialized in natural language processing and AI. The main products are tools aiming to improve written communications, develop English speaking skills and boost productivity. The company was founded in 2008 by Yael Karov and Avner Zangvil. Ginger Software uses the context of complete sentences to suggest corrections. In December 2011, Ginger Software was one of nine projects approved by the Board of Governors of the Israel-U.S. Binational Industrial Research and Development Foundation for a funding of $8.1 million. The company also raised $3 million from private Israeli and US investors in 2009.

In May, 2014 Intel acquired one of Ginger's business units and the rights to use the company's patented technology.

== Founders ==
Before founding Ginger Software, Yael Karov had worked with Rosetta Genomics as its Chief Technology Officer and Vice President of Research and Development from 2003 to 2006, and with ClickSoftware Technologies as a Director of Research and Development from 1990 to 1994. Karov also founded Agentics, a company specializing in free-text classification of e-commerce product information based on natural language processing, in 1996.

Avner Zangvil is the co-founder of Ginger Software. Zangvil co-founded Menta Software in 1996 with his brother Arnon Zangvil to develop a product that transforms any Windows-based application into a Web-enabled application usable from any remote computer running a Web browser. Menta was acquired by GraphOn Corporation in 2001.

== Technology ==
Ginger Software uses patented software algorithms in the field of natural language processing. The company claims that the algorithm allows it to correct the written sentences with relatively high accuracy (eliminating up to 95 percent of writing errors), compared to standard spell checkers. Its unique algorithm allows the software to understand the context of the sentence rather than correcting based solely on a word. According to its founder, Karov, the software operates on the logic of sentence context in addition to the memory of a database of words. The company is at the heart of a growing revolution in the world of assistive technology.

Ginger claims that the benefits of the software have been leveraged by native English and non-native speakers alike, and have also found value in niche markets like dyslexia management. They further claim that ESL users derive great benefit from the use of the software, as it lets them write error-free English text. Its use also extends to native English speaking business professionals and students who use it as a 'safety net' for their email edits, as well as international students writing in English.

More recently, the company has focused on implementing its technology in mobile devices as an integral component of its mobile keyboard products.

== Products ==
Ginger Software products include Ginger Page, a cross-platform writing enhancement app, and Ginger Keyboard which is available for Android devices.

Ginger Writer can be used as an online service or installed on your PC or Mac. It supports MS-Word, MS-Outlook, MS-PowerPoint, Microsoft Edge, Chrome, and functions as a writing enhancement app for Android and iOS mobile devices. Its main feature is English grammar and spelling checker that runs seamlessly with the different user interfaces. It also has an advanced paraphrasing tool, contextual synonyms and definitions, translation and a text-to-speech function that enables users to hear sentences before and after correction.

Ginger Keyboard for Android replaces the stock keyboard and functions as a productivity boosting keyboard app. Featuring a full set of advanced keyboard features like Stream (swipe-like) typing, adaptive word prediction, a wide variety of customizable themes and emoji, Ginger Keyboard is the only 3rd party keyboard to offer proofreading and other writing tools via one tap access to Ginger Page.

== Target segment ==
Ginger Software started off targeting people with dyslexia. The algorithm underlying the software studies a vast pool of proper sentences in English and builds a model of proper language. The software does not analyze the text at the level of the word, but of the whole sentence. Dyslexics can have trouble choosing the right word – hence the attention to the sentence as a whole. From 2010, Ginger Software included a new target segment in its marketing outreach – users of English as a second language (ESL). Its contextual-based writing correction tool could benefit those who are not proficient in the English language.

== Business model ==
The main business model for consumers is freemium. The free version offers contextual-based grammar and spelling checker with some limitations. Its premium features include unlimited access to Grammar Checker, the grammar and spelling checker, and Sentence Rephraser the rephrasing tool.

Ginger Keyboard is free to download and use, although it does offer in-app purchases like themes and theme packs. It also disables your original spell checker.

Ginger also provides a powerful Rest API which can correct full documents in one call.
