= Dilly beans =

Pickled green beans, often flavoured with dill

A jar of dilly beans

Dilly beans, or pickled green beans, are a means of preserving green beans.

Often flavored with dill, hence the name, common ingredients also include garlic, Tabasco sauce, and red pepper. While they are made in kitchens all over the United States, they are particularly common in Vermont, where green beans are abundant.

Dilly beans were developed as a commercial product in 1958 by Sonya Hagna and Jacquelyn Park, who made them the subject of a well-known radio advertising campaign. They became popular as a cocktail-hour snack in the US in the 1960s.
