= Beni shōga =

Japanese pickled ginger

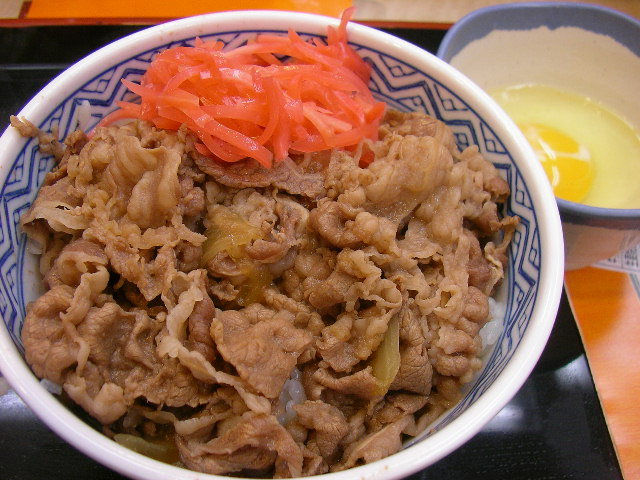
Beni shōga on a gyūdon

Beni shōga (紅生姜) is a type of tsukemono (Japanese pickle). It is made from thin strips of ginger pickled in umezu (梅酢), the vinegary pickling solution used to make umeboshi. The red color is traditionally derived from red perilla (Perilla frutescens var. crispa). Commercial beni shōga often derives its hue from artificial coloring. It is served with many Japanese dishes, including gyūdon, okonomiyaki, and yakisoba.

== See also ==
- Gari (ginger)
- List of pickled foods
