= Sergei Ginger =

Russian architect (1870–1937)

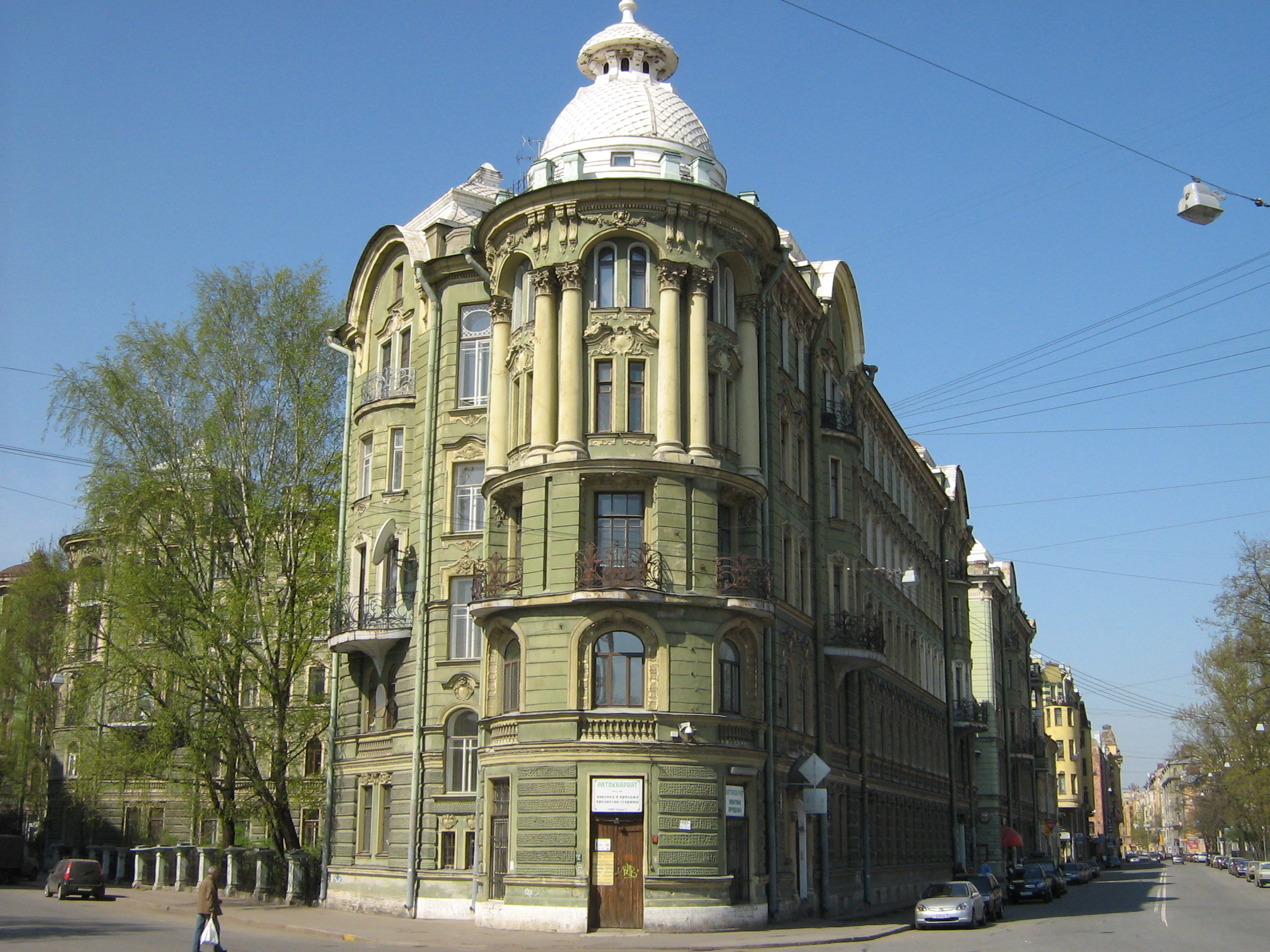
Kolobov House

Sergei Grigoryevich Ginger (Russian: Сергей Григорьевич Гингер) (1870 - 1937) was an Imperial Russian and Soviet architect born in what is now Moldova. He designed several buildings in his native Chișinău and in Saint Petersburg, where he was a member of the St. Petersburg Society of Architects. His work is representative of the Art Nouveau and neoclassical styles. Ginger was noted in particular for his residential buildings that occupy important sectors in the historic center of St. Petersburg and its suburbs, including Kolobov House and 53 Kamennoostrovsky Avenue, although in his younger years he designed a number of major buildings in Chișinău, including the Kostyuzhenskoy Psychiatric Hospital (1894), and what is now Lyubavicheskaya Synagogue (1898).

In 1934, during the Great Purge, Ginger was sent to exile to Tomsk, where he was subsequently arrested and executed in 1937.
