= Karashizuke =

Type of Japanese pickled vegetable

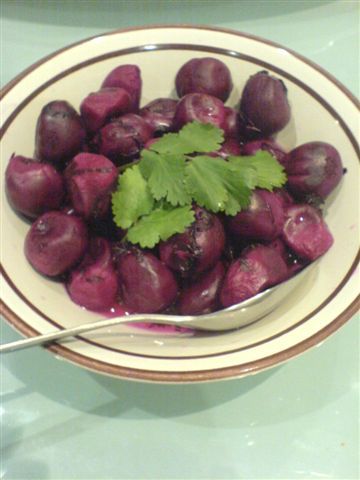
Eggplant tsukemono

Karashizuke (からし漬け) is pickled vegetable made in Japan. Like other forms of kasuzuke, the vegetables are pickled in soft sake lees (sake kasu) with salt, sugar, and mirin and then used to pickle salted vegetables.

Nasu Karashizuke (eggplant pickled in mustard and sake lees) is a popular type of karashizuke.
