= Gari (ginger) =

Thinly sliced ginger dish

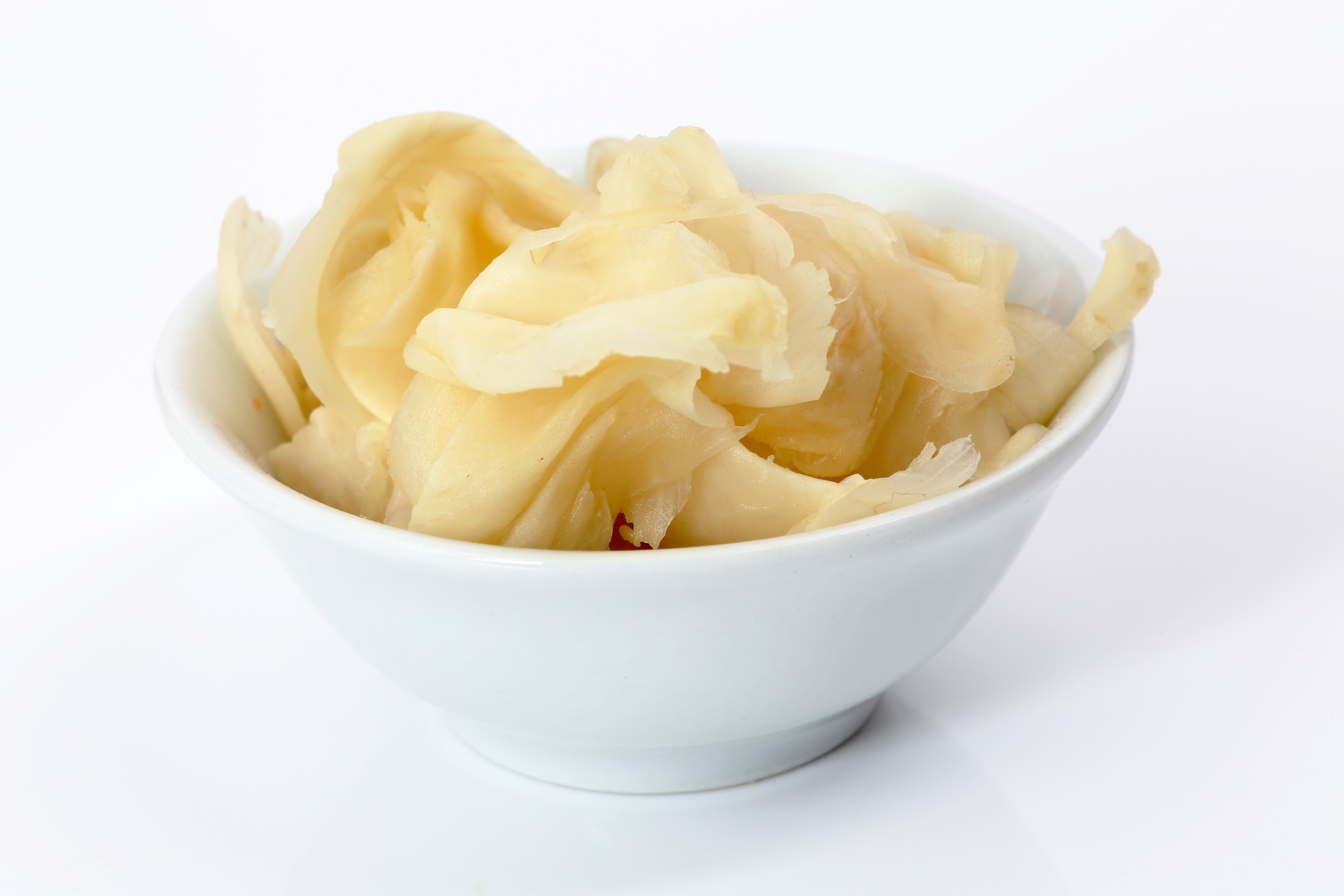
Gari

Gari (ガリ) is a type of tsukemono (Japanese pickled vegetables). It is made from sweet, thinly sliced ginger that has been marinated in a solution of sugar and vinegar. Younger ginger is generally preferred for gari because of its tender flesh and natural sweetness. Gari is often served and eaten after sushi, and is sometimes called sushi ginger. It may also simply be called pickled ginger. In Japanese cuisine, it is considered to be essential in the presentation of sushi. Some believe it is used to cleanse the palate between eating different pieces of sushi, or, alternatively, it may be eaten before or after the meal.

When traditionally prepared, gari typically has a pale yellow to slightly pink hue from the pickling process. Only very young ginger will develop the slight pink tint naturally. Many brands of commercially produced gari are colored pink, artificially or naturally, often by using E124, beet juice or red shiso (perilla leaves), either to intensify the existing pink color or because the ginger used was too mature to turn pink upon pickling.

== See also ==
- Beni shōga
- List of pickled foods
