= Laba garlic =

Chinese vinegar-preserved garlic

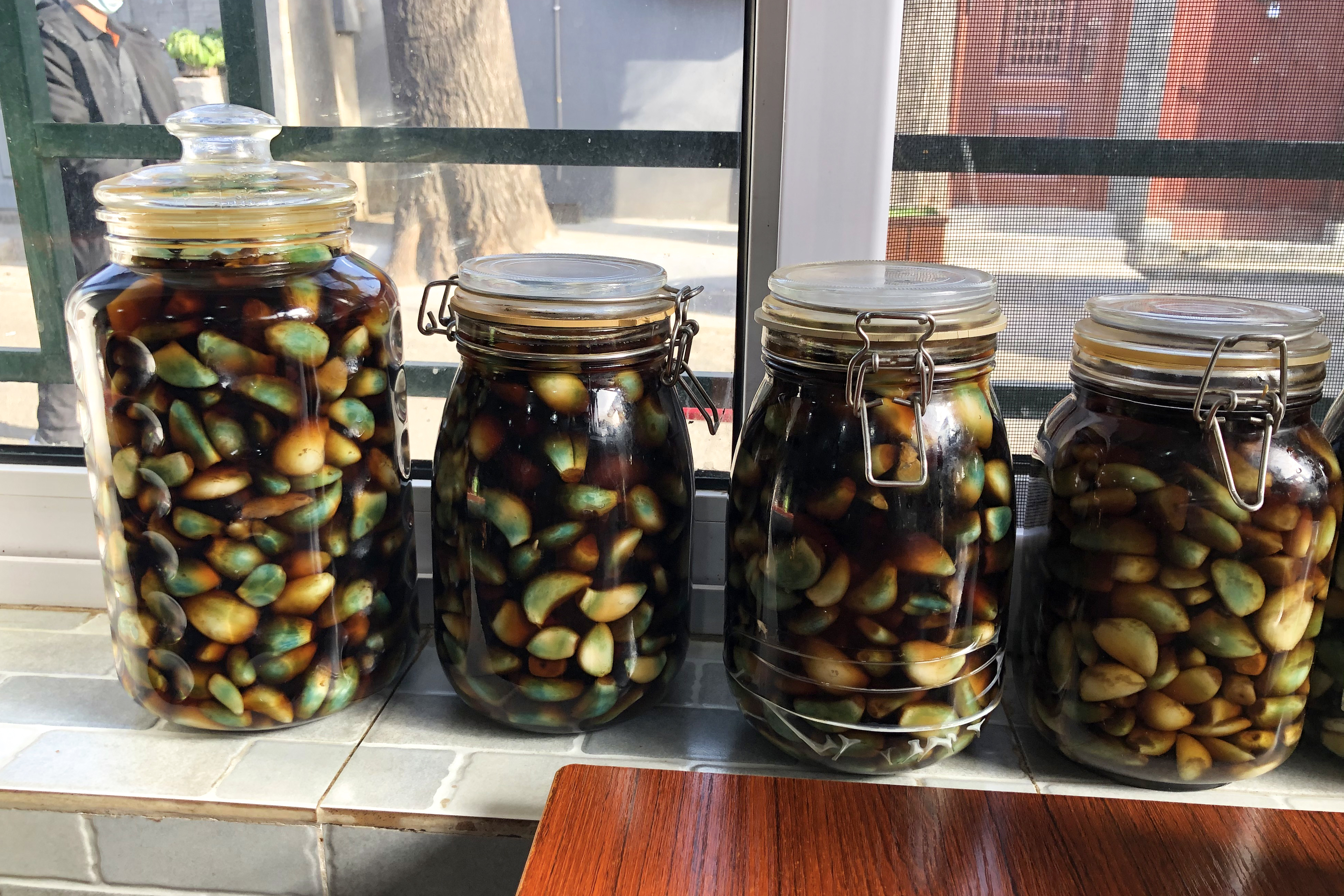
Laba garlic in jars

Laba garlic is a vinegar-preserved garlic from Chinese cuisine. Its refined color is green or blue and its taste is sour and slightly spicy. Because it is usually made in the 8th day of the 12th month of the Chinese Lunar calendar, the Laba Festival, it was named Laba garlic. In general, green and vinegary garlic is called Laba garlic.

Laba vinegar is the vinegar used to pickle the Laba garlic. The custom of making Laba garlic is more prevalent in northern China. Laba garlic and vinegar with dumplings are traditional foods for the Spring Festival in China. Laba garlic alone could also be a Chinese New Year dish.

== Culture ==
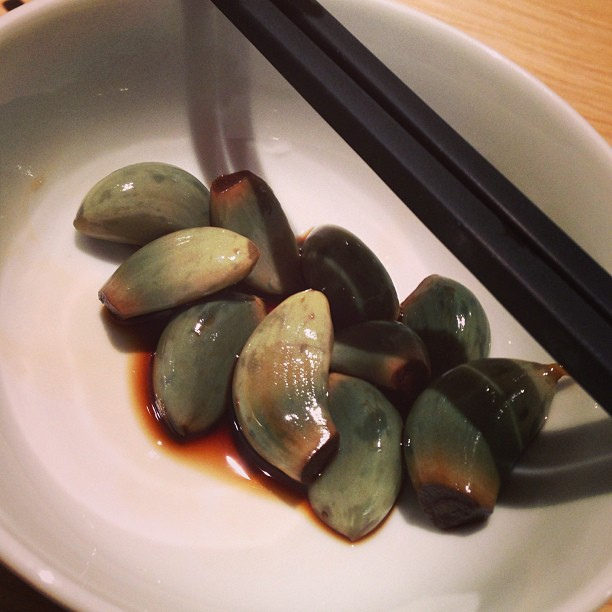
Laba garlic

The specific history of Laba garlic is unknown; One popular saying is that "garlic" and "count" are homonyms in Chinese. Businessmen usually count their financial income and expenditure of the year in lunar December eighth, and creditors also collect debts on this day. Because this day is close to China's traditional Spring Festival, the firms tapu direct debt collecting in people's homes. So the gift of vinegar pickled garlic indicated debt collection.

== Preparation ==
Garlic is skinned and washed and put with vinegar into a container, which is then sealed. Sugar and salt may be added according to personal preference. The container is placed in a low-temperature environment. Storage time is not fixed, usually about 20 days, until the color is green.

In some areas and families, there is a method of making "Orthodox" Laba garlic, using specific purple garlic and rice vinegar in the eighth day of lunar December.

== Source of color ==
The abundant sulfur compounds in garlic are responsible. These are normally kept separate from an enzyme (alliinase) that can act on them. However, acidity damages the cells of the garlic, allowing the enzyme to cleave the sulfur-containing compound alliin to release reactive thiosulfinates. These then react with each other and with amino acids found naturally within cells to make pyrroles, clusters of carbon-nitrogen rings. These rings can be linked together into polypyrrole molecules. Ring structures absorb light and thus appear colored. The exact color depends on the number of pyrrole rings and the amino acids involved. When four of the pyrrole rings have been joined together, the resulting structure is very like phycobilin, a compound used by algae and some bacteria to capture light for photosynthesis. In Laba garlic, the green color results from pyrrole pigments formed when sulfur compounds react with amino acids under acidic conditions. Over time, prolonged soaking or fumigation may cause these pigments to polymerize and oxidize, gradually shifting the color from green to yellow.

== See also ==
- List of garlic dishes
