= Curtido =

Fermented cabbage relish from Central America

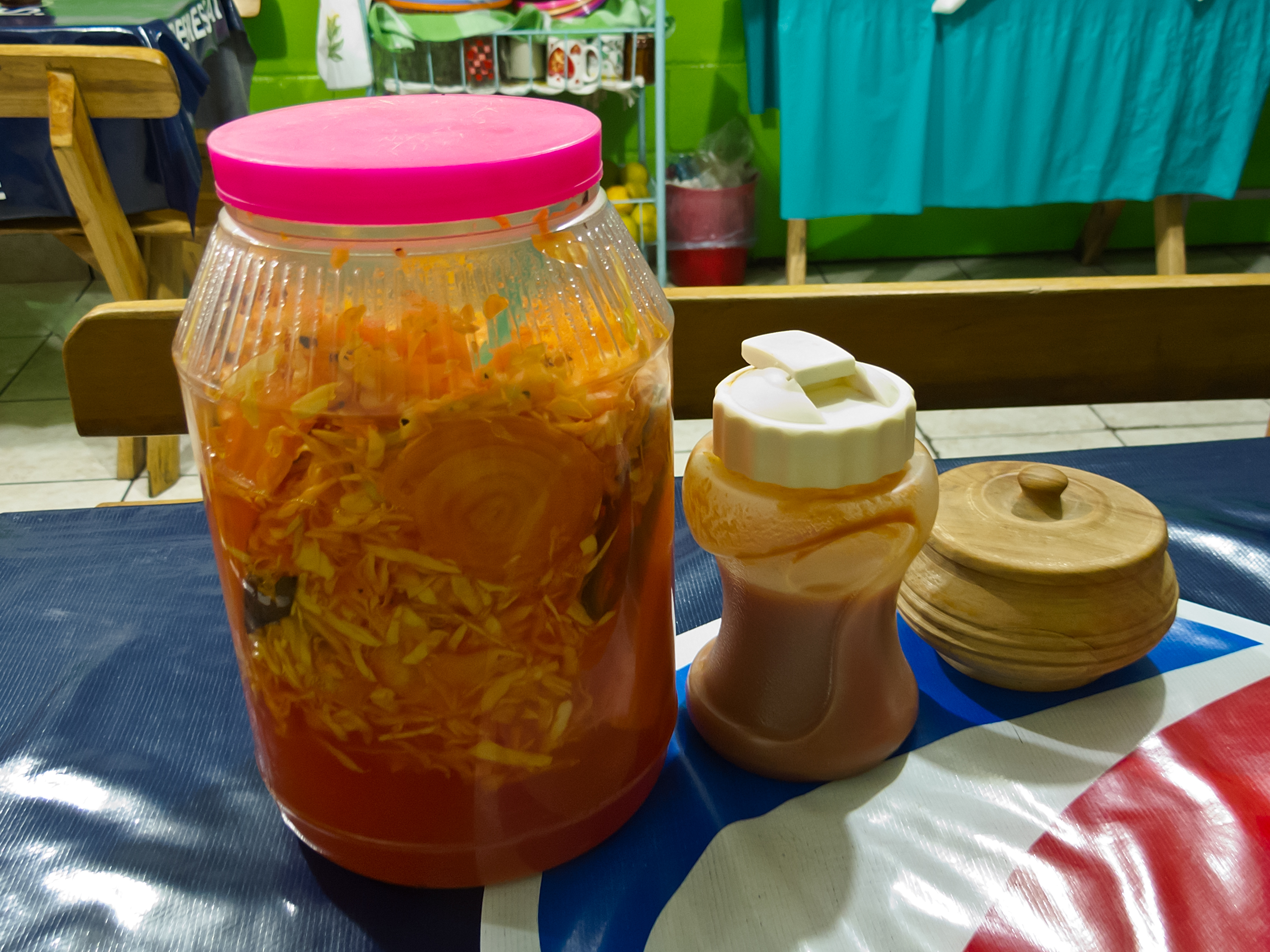
- Curtido (jar on left) for pupusas, in a pupusa stand in Olocuilta, El Salvador
- Type: Salad
- Place of origin: El Salvador, Belize
- Main ingredients: Cabbage, onions, carrots, habaneros
- Similar dishes: Pikliz

Curtido (Spanish pronunciation: [kuɾˈtiðo]) is a type of lightly fermented relish. It is typical in Salvadoran cuisine and that of other Central American countries. In El Salvador it is usually made with cabbage, onions, carrots, oregano, and sometimes lime juice; it resembles sauerkraut, kimchi, pikliz or tart coleslaw. It is commonly served alongside pupusas, a national specialty.

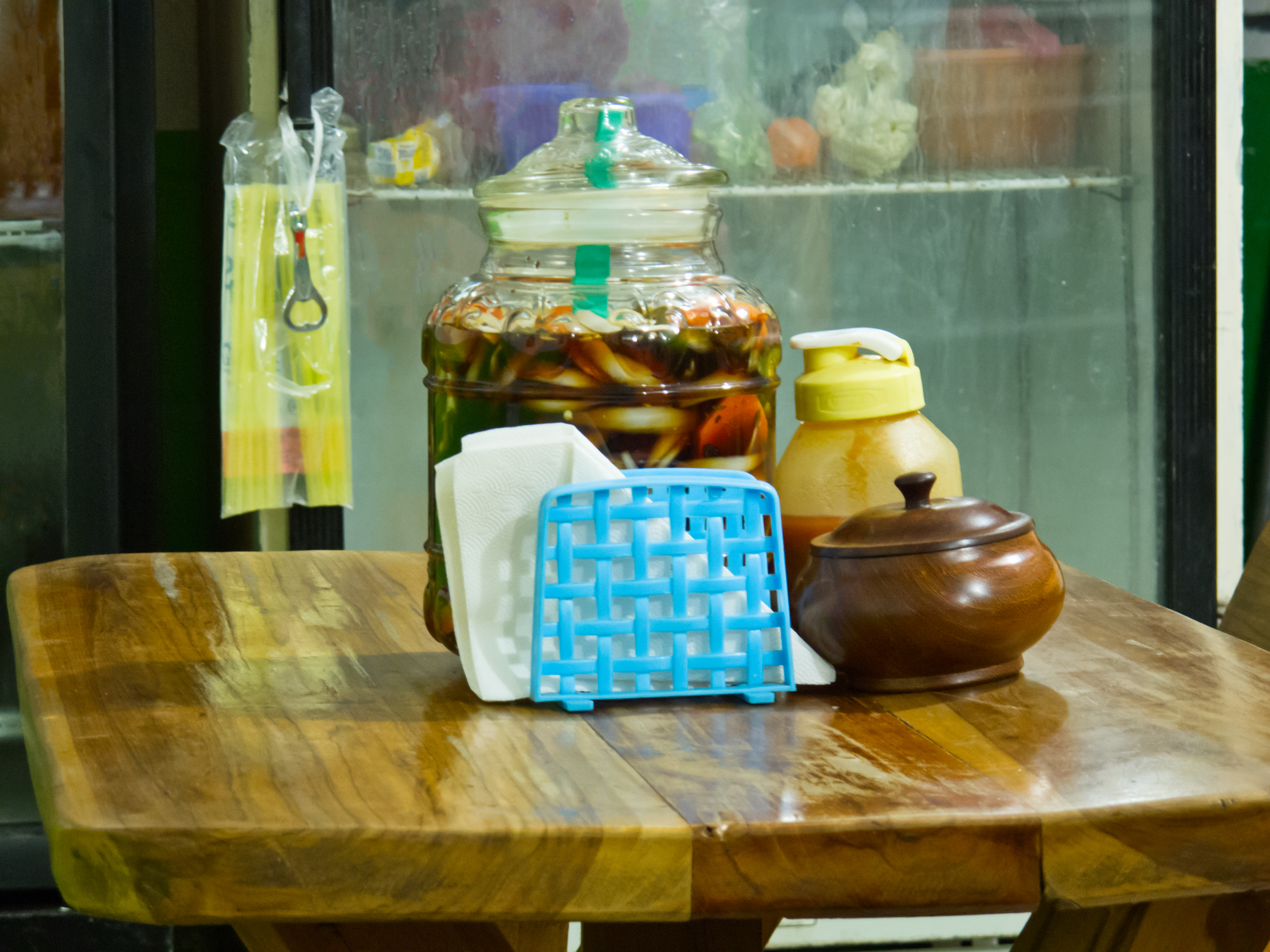
Curtido made with onions, chillies and carrots, in a pupusería in Olocuilta, El Salvador

In Belize, curtido is a spicy, fermented relish made with onions, habaneros, and vinegar, and is used to top salbutes, garnaches, and other common dishes in Belizean cuisine.

== See also ==
- Encurtido – a pickled vegetable appetizer, side dish and condiment in the Mesoamerican region
- List of cabbage dishes
- List of fermented foods
- Vigorón – Nicaraguan pork and vegetable dish
