= George Ginger =

British philatelist

George Ginger (1863 – 29 November 1938) was a British philatelist who signed the Roll of Distinguished Philatelists in 1934. Ginger was an expert on the stamps of Victoria and prominent in philatelic circles in Manchester.

In 1930, Ginger was awarded the Tapling Medal by the Royal Philatelic Society London for his display of the Diadem stamps of New South Wales.

His collection of philatelic material relating to Victoria for the period 1850 to 1883 forms part of the British Library Philatelic Collections. It was transferred from The Manchester Museum, The University of Manchester in 2006.
