= Giardiniera =

Italian relish of pickled vegetables in vinegar or oil

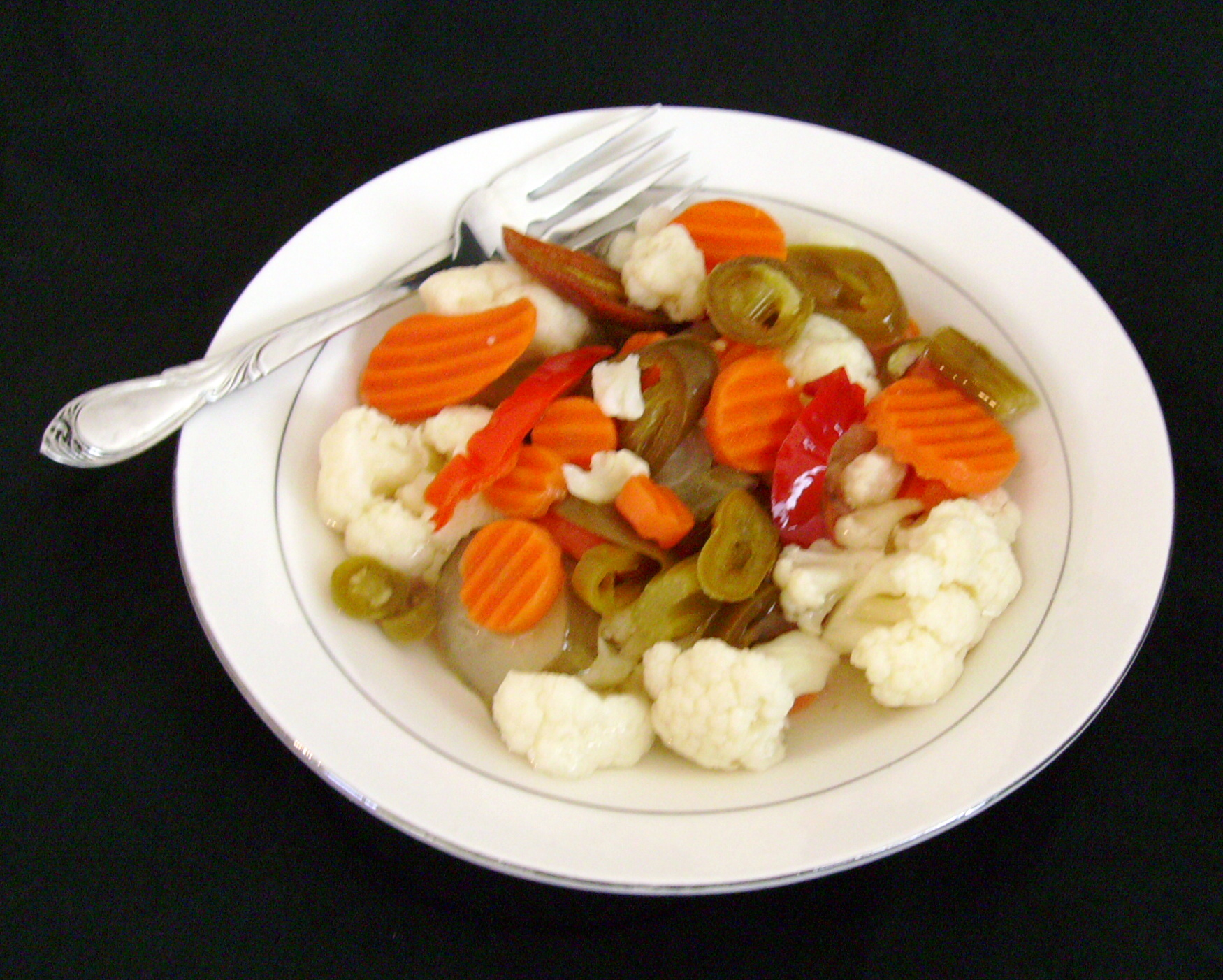
A small plate of giardiniera

Giardiniera (/dʒɑːrdɪˈnjɛərə/, Italian: [dʒardiˈnjɛːra]) is an Italian relish of pickled vegetables in vinegar or oil.

== Varieties and uses ==
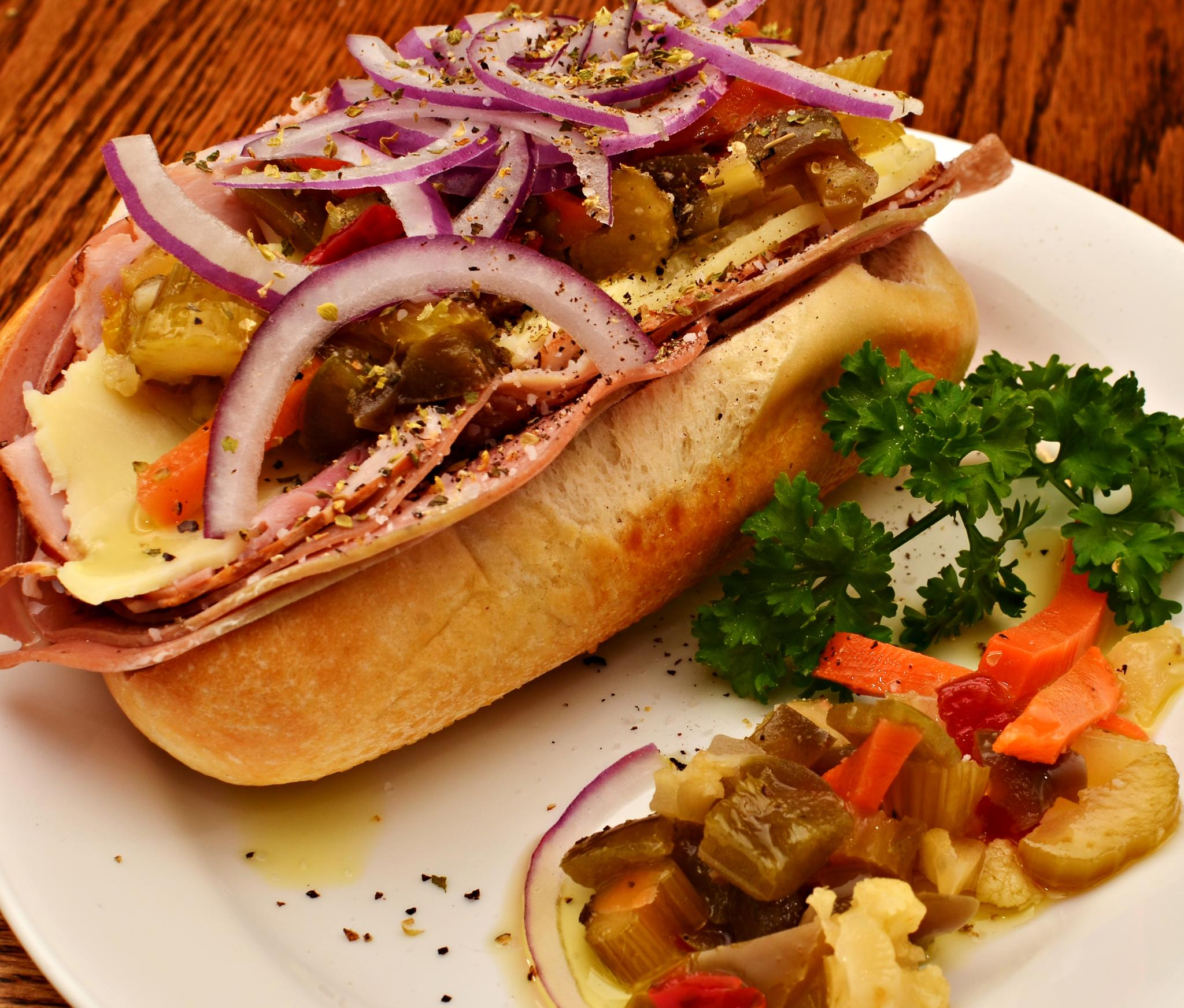
A sandwich accompanied by giardiniera

Italian giardiniera is also called sottaceti (lit. 'under vinegar'), a common term for pickled foods. It is typically eaten as an antipasto or with salads.

In the United States, giardiniera is commonly available in traditional or spicy varieties, and the latter is sometimes referred to as "hot mix".

Giardiniera is a versatile condiment that can be used on a variety of different foods, such as bratwurst, bruschetta, burgers, pasta salad, eggs (omelets), hot dogs, tuna salad, sandwiches, and much more.

In the cuisine of Chicago, an oil-based giardiniera is often used as a condiment, typically as a topping on Italian beef sandwiches, subs, and pizza.

Giardiniera is the base for the muffaletta sandwich which also combines olives, other vegetables and peperoncini for the overall "piquant salad" used as a spread.

== Ingredients ==
The Italian version includes bell peppers, celery, carrots, cauliflower and gherkins. The pickled vegetables are marinated in oil, red- or white-wine vinegar, herbs and spices.

Chicago-style giardiniera is commonly made spicy with sport peppers (Capsicum annuum, similar to serrano or tabasco peppers, but a little smaller, and green or yellow instead of bright red) or chili flakes, along with a combination of assorted vegetables, including bell peppers, celery, carrots, cauliflower, and sometimes gherkins or olives, all marinated in vegetable oil, olive oil, soybean oil, or any combination of the three. Some commercially prepared versions are labeled "Chicago-style giardiniera".

== See also ==
- List of pickled foods
- Encurtido – a pickled vegetable appetizer, side dish and condiment in the Mesoamerican region
- Jangajji – Korean pickled vegetable dish
- Torshi – Procedure of preserving food in brine or vinegar
- Piccalilli – British relish of chopped pickled vegetables and spices
