= Pickled meat snack =

Meat, typically offal, in vinegar

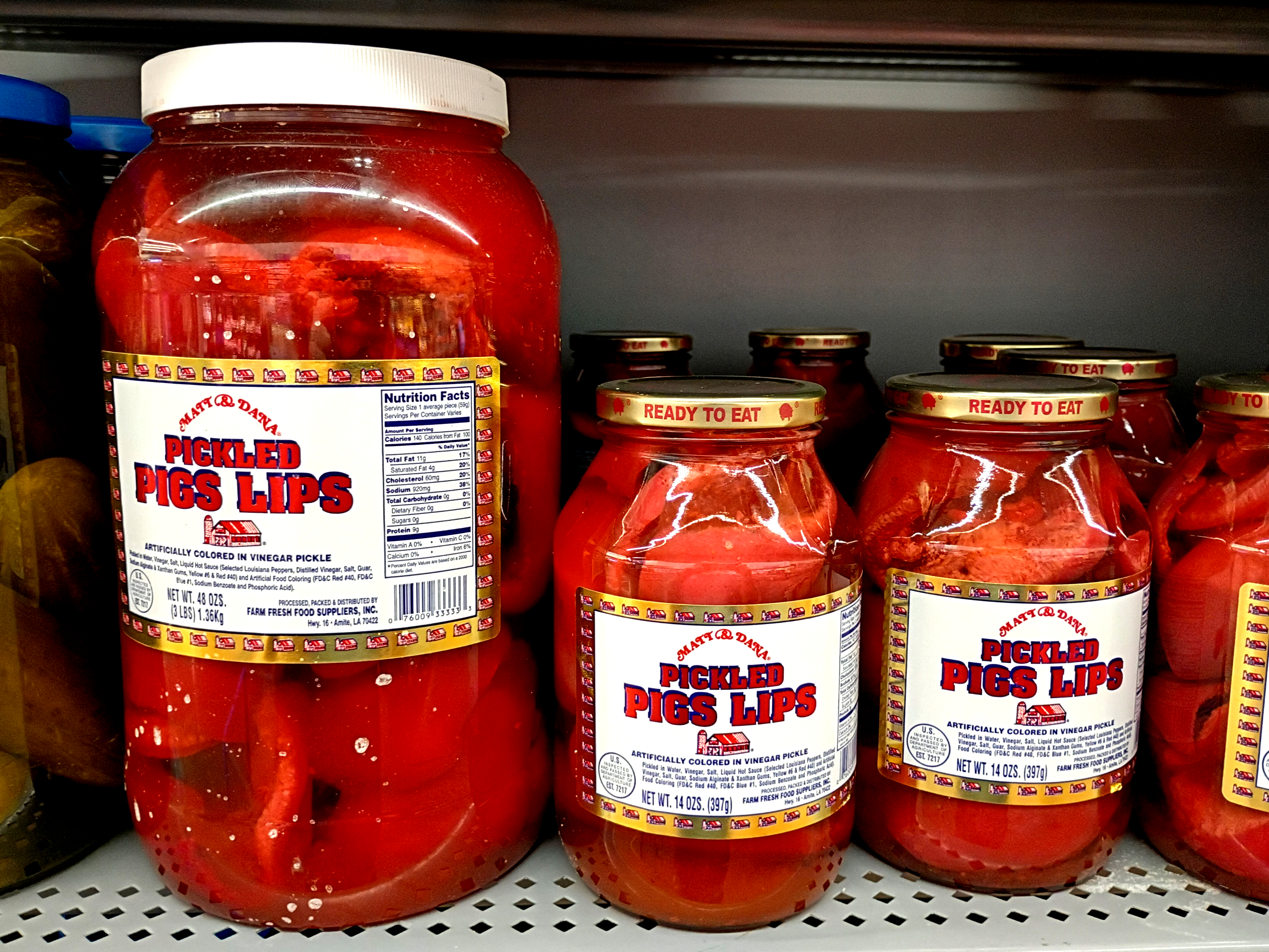
Pickled pig lips, Louisiana

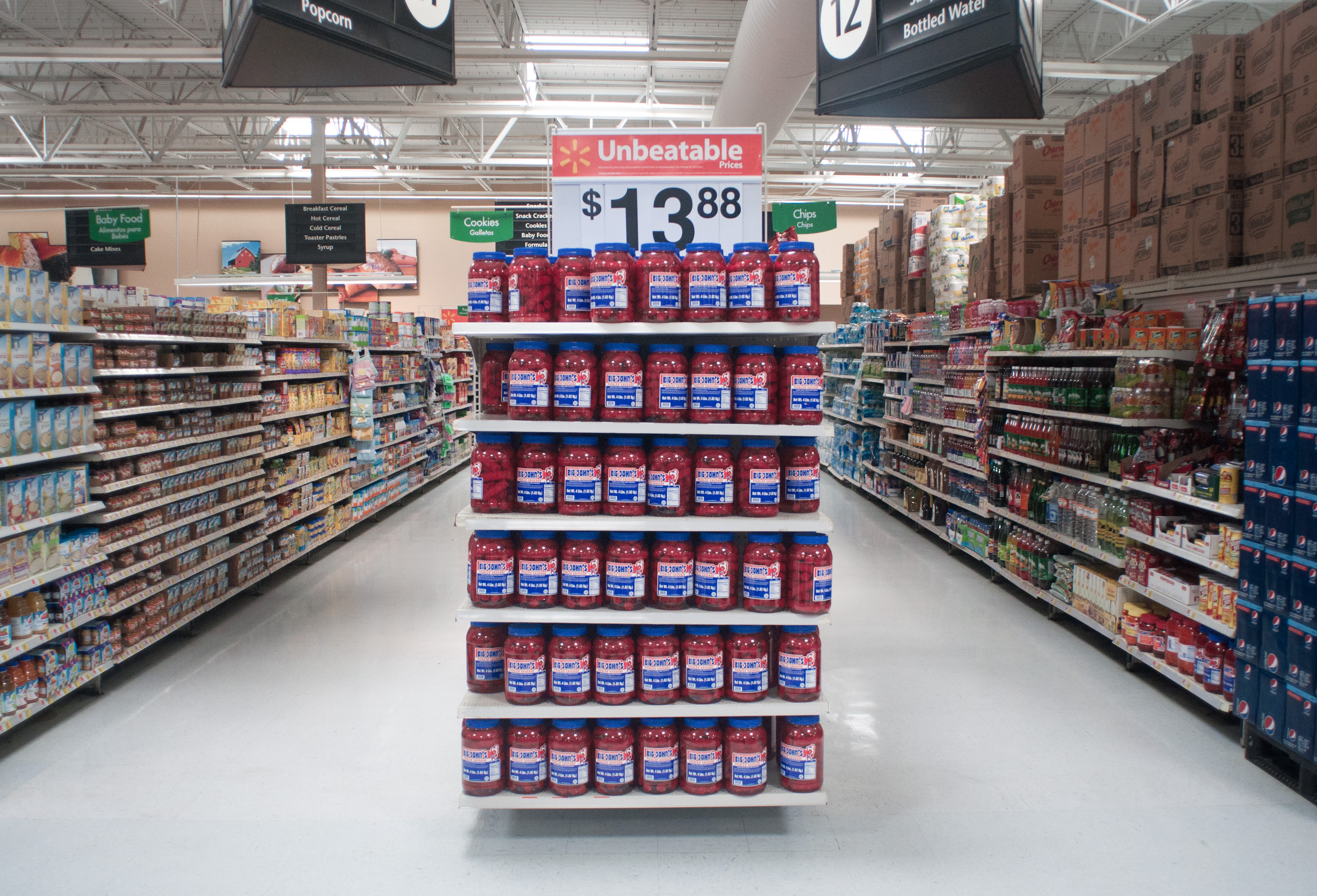
Pickled sausages in a Walmart, Florida

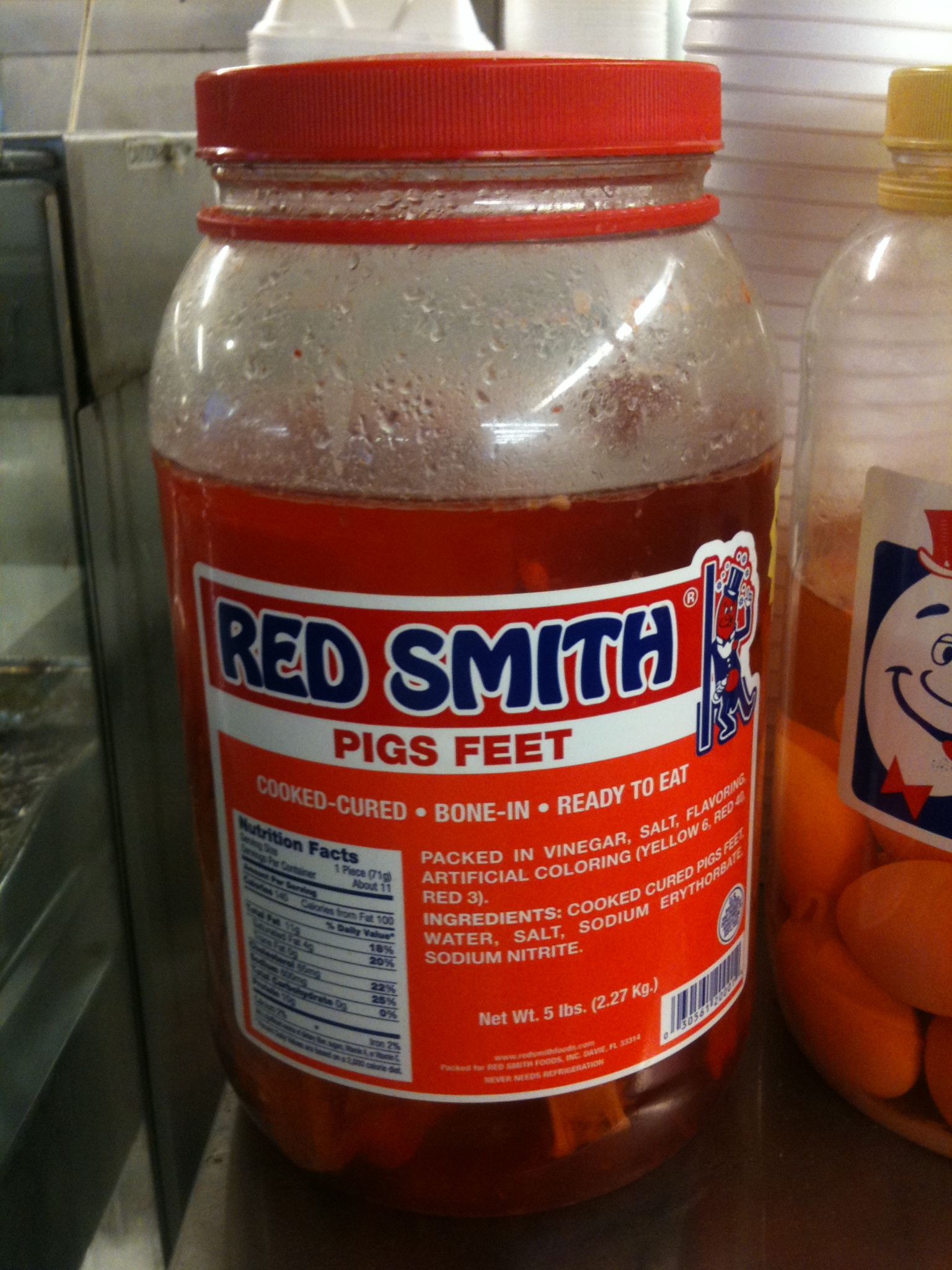
Pickled pig's feet, Florida

Pickled meat snacks are a Midwestern, Rocky Mountain and Southern cuisine snack made by pickling meat, particularly offal, in vinegar. Pickled meat snacks were historically popular at bars and general stores in the American South, but have waned in mass appeal to become a delicacy.

== Preparation and consumption ==
Commercially prepared pickled meat snacks are typically sold in multi-gallon glass jars, and are oftened pickled in a bright red food dye brine. The snacks are sold from the jar on the countertop at bars and gas stations using tongs and served in a styrofoam cup, often alongside dill pickles and pickled eggs.

Pickled pigs lips in Louisiana are customarily paired with potato chips by putting a lip into a crushed chip bag and shaking the contents, coating the lips before eating.

== History ==
Pickled meat snacks arose from food preservation efforts prior to wide-spread refrigeration, as well as making use of what would otherwise be food waste. In the Antebellum South, black slaves developed the pickling of offal that they were allowed from white planters to preserve the meat. Pork was the dominant meat by far in the Antebellum South—owing to the hot, moist climate—giving rise to pickled pork offal in particular.

In the Black Belt in the American South, pickled meat snacks were historically omnipresent at the countertops of general stores. Pickled pig's feet in particular are eaten during New Year's Eve celebrations, believed to bring good luck for the new year. Even as consumer interest has fallen in the 21st century, pickled meat snacks are valued as a shelf-stable food in South Florida to prepare for hurricanes.

Pickled meat snacks were a popular bar snack in Wisconsin among European American immigrant blue-collar workers in the 20th century. Pickled pig's feet were also popular at dive bars in the northeastern mountain states. However, pickled meat snacks were increasingly rejected by younger bar-goers at the turn of the 21st century; with the 21st century growth of the Hispanic-American population, cueritos (Latin cuisine pickled pork rinds) have gained prevalence over endemic American-cuisine pickled meat snacks.

== List of varieties ==
- Pickled gizzards
- Pickled pork offal
  - Pickled pig's ear
  - Pickled pig's feet
  - Pickled pig's lips
  - Pickled pork rinds
  - Pickled pork tail
- Pickled sausage

== See also ==
- Pickled eggs
- Kool-Aid pickles
- Utopenec
