= Pickled pork =

Pickled pork may refer to:

- Various types of pickled Head cheese
- Pickled pork, also referred to as pickle meat, a Louisiana specialty often serves with red beans and rice.
