= Pickling =

Procedure of preserving food in brine or vinegar

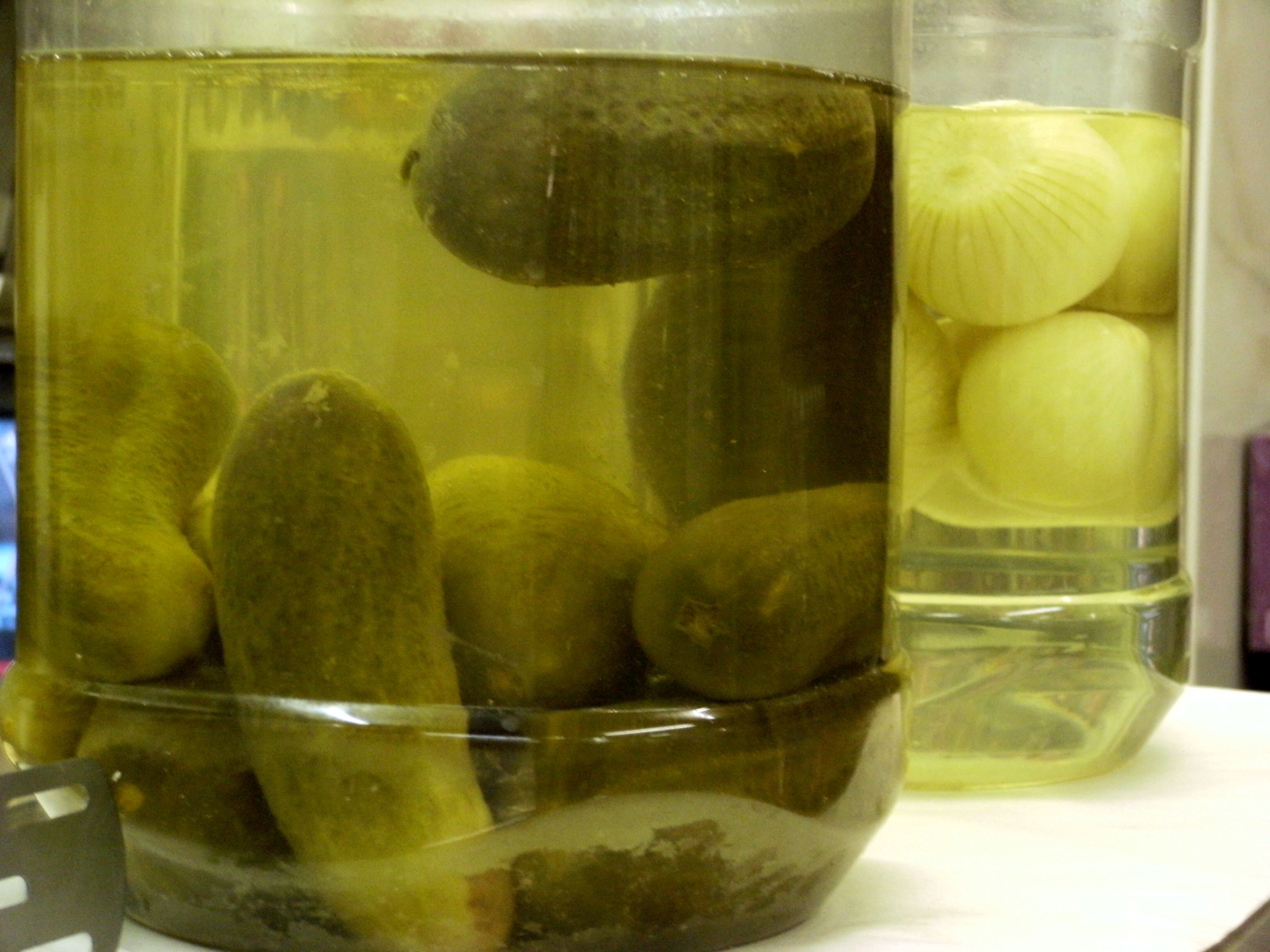
A jar of pickled cucumbers (front) and a jar of pickled onions (back)

Pickling is the process of preserving or extending the shelf life of food by either anaerobic fermentation in brine or immersion in vinegar. The pickling procedure typically affects the food's texture and flavor. The resulting food is called a pickle, or, if otherwise named, the name is prefaced with the word "pickled". Foods that are pickled include vegetables, fruits, mushrooms, meats, fish, dairy and eggs.

Pickling solutions are typically highly acidic, with a pH of 4.6 or lower, and high in salt, preventing enzymes from working and micro-organisms from multiplying. Pickling can preserve perishable foods for months, or in some cases years. Antimicrobial herbs and spices, such as mustard seed, garlic, cinnamon or cloves, are often added. If the food contains sufficient moisture, a pickling brine may be produced simply by adding dry salt. For example, sour cabbage, sauerkraut, and kimchi are produced by salting the vegetables to draw out excess water. Natural fermentation at room temperature, by lactic acid bacteria, produces the required acidity. Other pickles are made by placing vegetables in vinegar. Unlike the canning process, pickling (which includes fermentation) does not require that the food be completely sterile. The acidity or salinity of the solution, the temperature of fermentation, and the exclusion of oxygen determine which microorganisms dominate, and determine the flavor of the end product.

When both salt concentration and temperature are low, Leuconostoc mesenteroides dominates, producing a mix of acids, alcohol, and aroma compounds. At higher temperatures Lactobacillus plantarum dominates, which produces primarily lactic acid. Many pickles start with Leuconostoc, and change to Lactobacillus with higher acidity.

== History ==
=== Ancient history ===
Pickling with vinegar likely originated in ancient Persia and Mesopotamia around 2400 BCE. There is archaeological evidence of cucumbers being pickled in the Tigris Valley in 2030 BCE. Pickling vegetables in vinegar continued developing in the Middle East region before spreading to the Maghreb, Sicily, and Spain. From Spain, it spread to the Americas. Fermented salt pickling reportedly originated in China.

Textual and archaeological evidence shows that food preservation by salting and pickling was practiced in the Greek and Roman world.

=== Age of Exploration ===
Pickling was used as a way to preserve food for out-of-season use and for long journeys, especially by sea. Salt pork and salt beef were common staples for sailors before the days of steam engines. Although the process was invented to preserve foods, pickles are also made and eaten because people enjoy the resulting flavors. Pickling may also improve the nutritional value of food by introducing B vitamins produced by bacteria.

=== Etymology ===
The English term "pickle" first appears around 1400 CE. It originates from the Middle English pikel, a spicy sauce served with meat or fish, borrowed from Middle Dutch or Middle Low German pekel ("brine") but later referred to preserving in brine or vinegar.

The Persian term "torshi" (Persian: ترشی) applies to pickled vegetables in many Middle Eastern, Caucasian, Slavic, and Balkan cuisines. The term is ultimately derived from Persian torsh 'sour' (Persian: ترش). This Persian word is borrowed with minor variants in many languages: Kurdish ترشى Tirşîn, tirşî, trshin; Turkish and Azerbaijani turşu; Greek: τουρσί, romanized: toursí; Bosnian, Croatian, Montenegrin, Serbian, Macedonian, Bulgarian turšija/туршија/туршия turshiya; Albanian: turshi; Judeo-Spanish trushí.

== In world cuisines ==
=== Asia ===
==== Western Asia ====
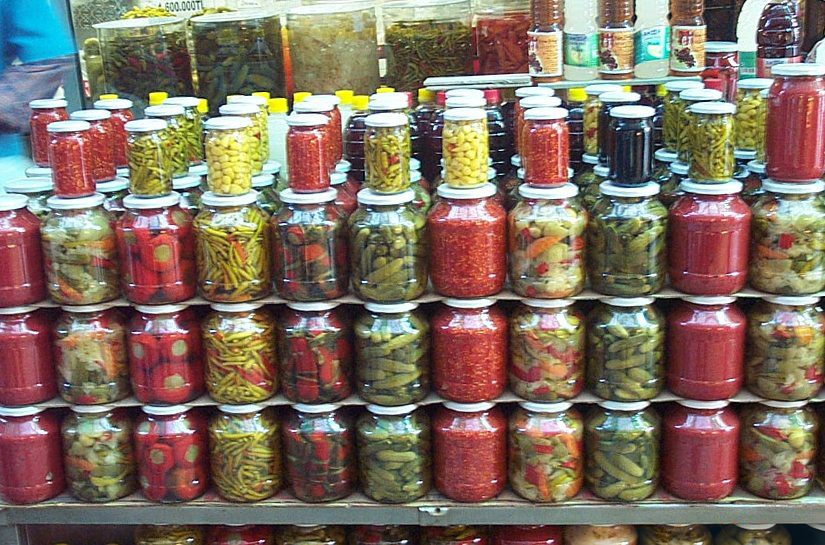
Torshi, traditional pickles in Southeast Europe, West Asia and Northern Africa

In Iran, Armenia, Turkey, Arab countries, Northern Africa, the Balkans, and some other countries in West Asia, pickles that are called torshi, or mekhallel are a pickled mix of cucumbers, and turnips, onions, carrots, olives or other regional vegetables. Toursi is a traditional appetizer (meze) to go with arak, rakı, ouzo, oghi, tsipouro, and rakia. In some regions, notably in Turkey (turşu suyu), the pickle juice or torshi water is a popular beverage. In 2021, Turkey's pickle exports reached the level of $300 million.

Iran has hundreds of types of torshi (Persian: تورشی), according to regional customs and different events. In some families, no meal is considered complete without a bowl of torshi on the table.

In Armenia and Armenian cuisine, it is called t’tu (Armenian: թթու) often eaten as an appetizer. Vegetables used include cabbage, cucumber, tomato, carrot, cauliflower, beetroot, eggplant, bell pepper, garlic, onion and turnip, often preserved in brine or vinegar and spiced with garlic, herbs, or chili. It is served alongside other Armenian appetizers like topik, lavash, aboukh/basturma, sujukh and matsoon. It is also often used in wraps such as the brduch.

In Egypt, pickled vegetables are referred to as both torshi (طرشي) and mekhalel (مخلل). Both terms refer to all varieties of pickled vegetables, including carrots, cucumbers, turnips, garlic, onions, cauliflower, and hot peppers, preserved in a vinegar-based brine infused with spices such as nigella seeds, black pepper, and bay leaves. It is ubiquitous on Egyptian tablespreads, especially for breakfast.

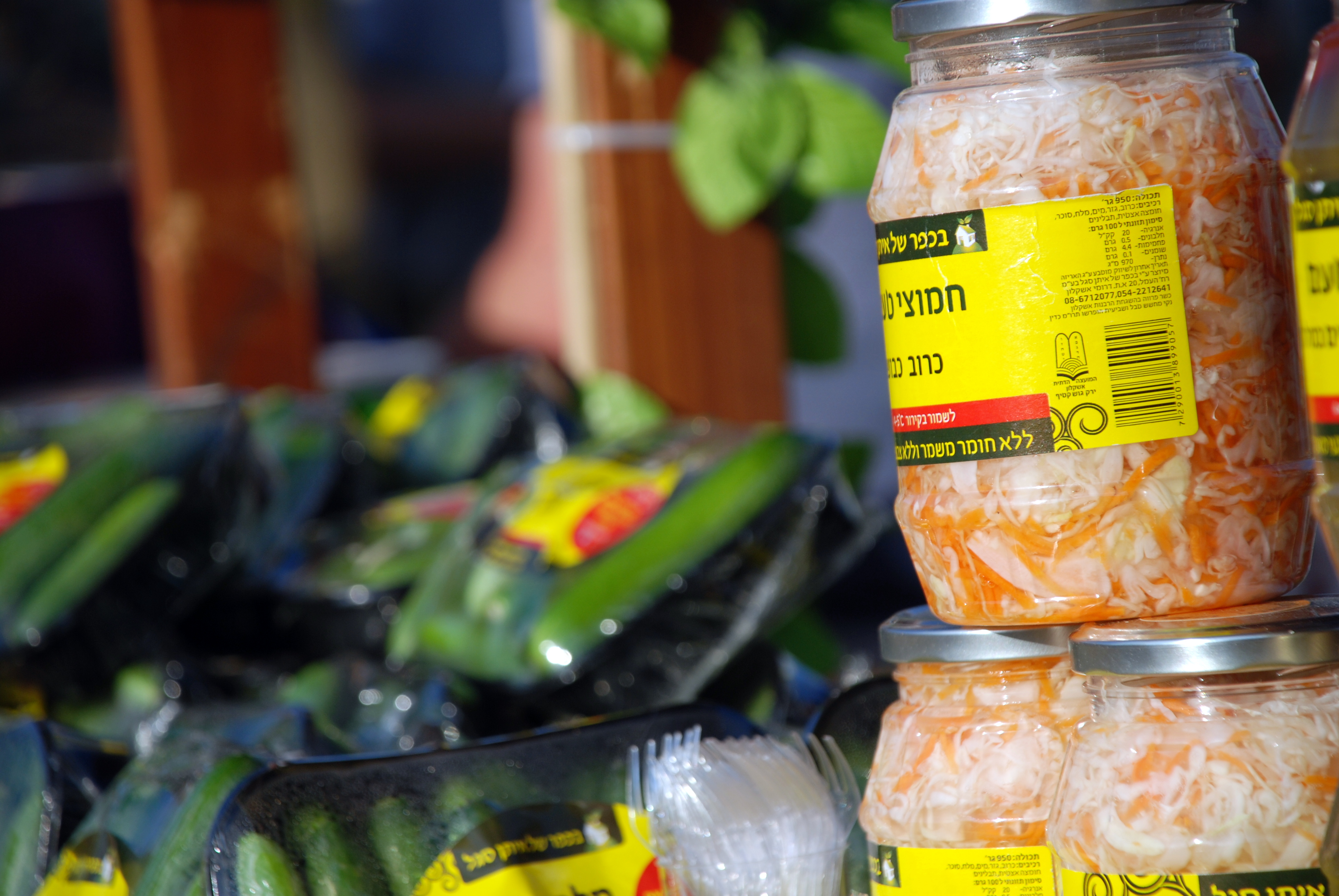
Kosher torshi in Israel

Cabbage, carrots, and bell peppers pickled in vinegar are commonly consumed in Israel. Pickled vegetables are considered pareve, meaning they contain no meat or dairy and can be eaten with either while adhering to Jewish dietary laws.

==== South Asia ====
South Asia has a large variety of pickles (known as achar (अचार, اچار) in Nepali, Assamese, Bengali, Hindi (अचार), Punjabi, Gujarati, Urdu (اچار) uppinakaayi in Kannada, lonacha (लोणचं) in Marathi, uppilittathu or achar in Malayalam, oorukai in Tamil, pacchadi (పచ్చడి) or ooragaya (ఊరగాయ) in Telugu, which are mainly made from varieties of mango, lemon, lime, gongura (a sour leafy shrub), tamarind, Indian gooseberry (amla), and chilli. Vegetables such as eggplant, carrots, cauliflower, tomato, bitter gourd, green tamarind, ginger, garlic, onion, and citron are also occasionally used. These fruits and vegetables are mixed with ingredients such as salt, spices, and vegetable oils. The pickling process is completed by placing filled jars in the sun to mature.

In Pakistan, pickles are known locally as achaar (in Urdu اچار) and come in a variety of flavours. A popular item is the traditional mixed Hyderabadi pickle, prepared from an assortment of fruits (most notably mangoes) and vegetables blended with selected spices. Although the origin of the word is ambiguous, the word āchār is widely considered to be of Persian origin. Āchār in Persian is defined as 'powdered or salted meats, pickles, or fruits, preserved in salt, vinegar, honey, sugar or syrup.'

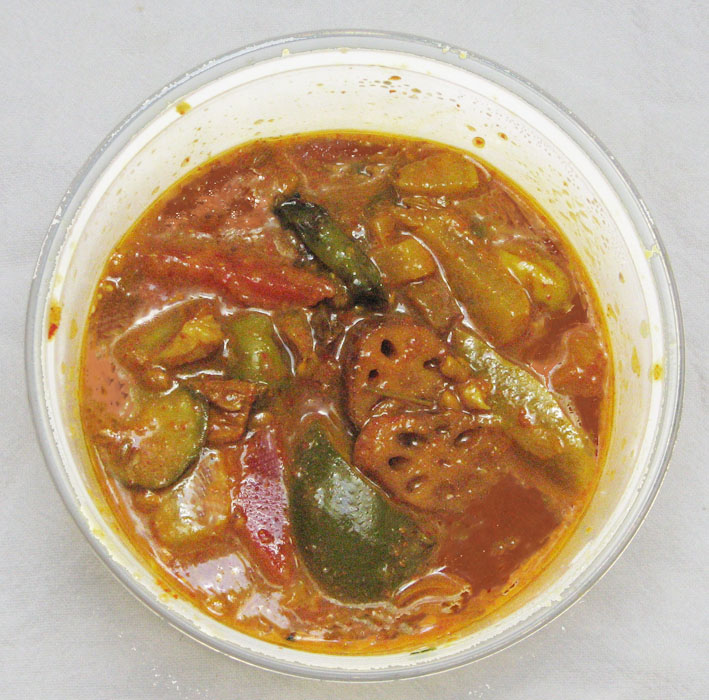
Indian mixed pickle, containing lotus root, lemon, carrot, green mango, green chilis, and other ingredients

In Sri Lanka, a date and shallot pickle, achcharu, is traditionally prepared from carrots, chilli powder, shallots and ground dates mixed with garlic, crushed fresh ginger, green chilis, mustard seeds and vinegar, and left to sit in a clay pot.

Indian pickles are mostly prepared in three ways: salt/brine, oil, and vinegar, with mango pickle being popular among all.

==== Southeast Asia ====
Singapore, Indonesian and Malaysian pickles, called acar are typically made out of cucumber, carrot, bird's eye chilies, and shallots, these items being seasoned with vinegar, sugar and salt. Fruits, such as papaya and pineapple, are also sometimes pickled. In Malaysia, it's common for pickles to be made in brine (usually made with sugar or starchy water to provide the best environment for fermentation). These pickles, known locally as jeruk, are made from unripe mango, papaya, pineapple and lime. Eaten with a meal, or on its own as a snack, jeruk is especially popular among children.

In the Philippines, pickling is a common method of preserving food, with many commonly eaten foods pickled, traditionally within large earthen jars. The process is known as buro or binuro. Pickling was a common method of preserving a large variety of foods such as fish throughout the archipelago before the advent of refrigeration, but its popularity is now confined to vegetables and fruits. Atchara is primarily made out of julienned green papaya, carrots, and shallots, seasoned with cloves of garlic and vinegar; but could include ginger, bell peppers, white radishes, cucumbers or bamboo shoots. Pickled unripe mangoes or burong mangga, unripe tomatoes, guavas, jicama, bitter gourd and other fruit and vegetables still retain their appeal. Siling labuyo, sometimes with garlic and red onions, is also pickled in bottled vinegar and is a staple condiment in Filipino cuisine.

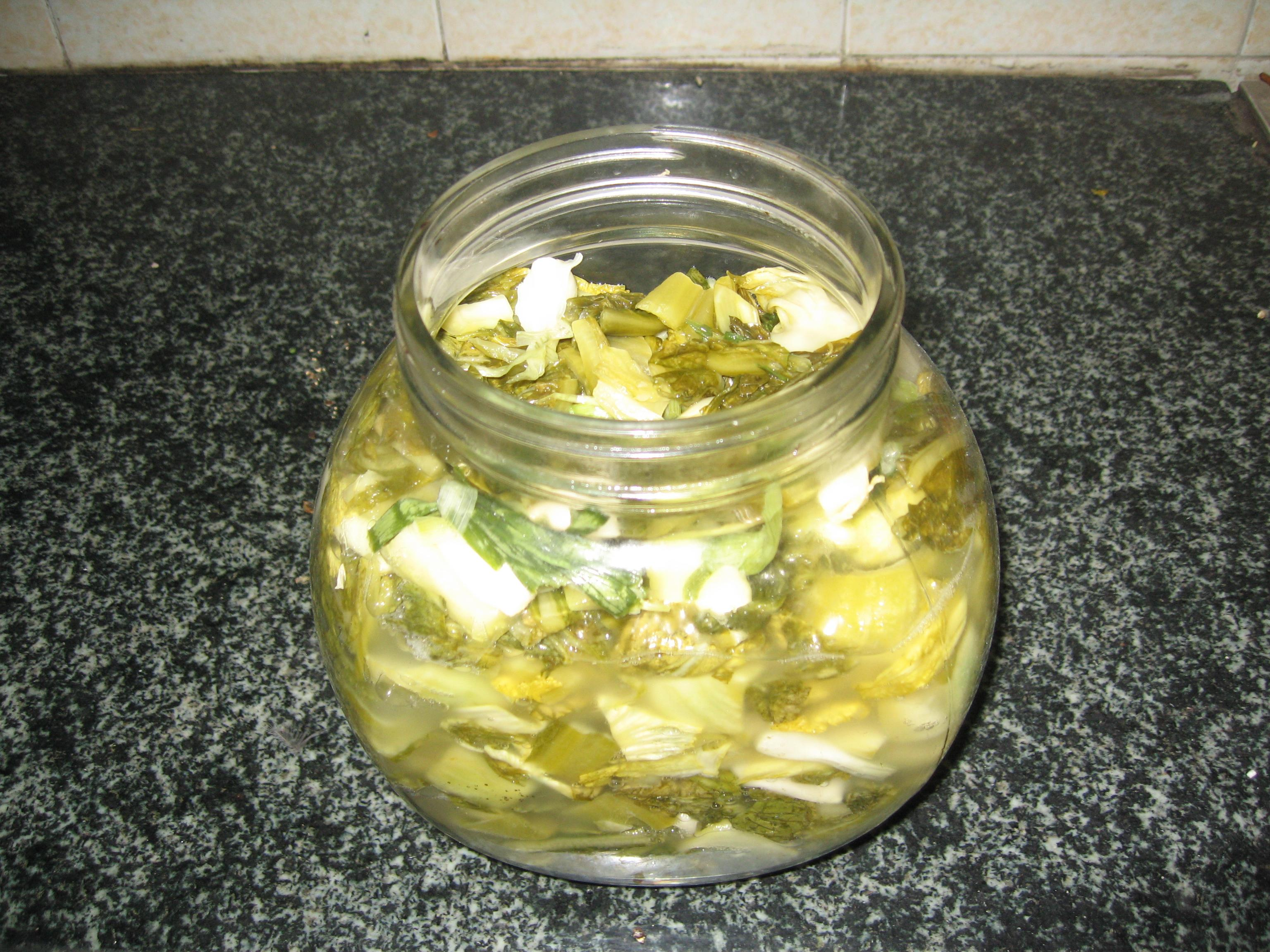
Dưa cải muối made from cải bẹ xanh

In Vietnamese cuisine, vegetable pickles are called dưa muối ("salted vegetables") or dưa chua ("sour vegetables"). Dưa chua or dưa góp is made from a variety of fruits and vegetables, including cà pháo, eggplant, Napa cabbage, kohlrabi, carrots, radishes, papaya, cauliflower, and sung. Dưa chua made from carrots and radishes are commonly added to bánh mì sandwiches. Dưa cải muối is made by pressing and sun-drying vegetables such as cải xậy and gai choy. Nhút mít, made from jackfruit, is a specialty of Nghệ An and Hã Tĩnh provinces.

In Burma, tea leaves are pickled to produce lahpet, which has strong social and cultural importance. Lahpet thoke (tea leaf salad) is a popular dish made with fermented tea leaves, garlic, peanuts, sesame seeds, dried shrimp, and other seasonings. It is often served as a delicacy at social gatherings and traditional ceremonies. The tradition of pickling tea leaves dates back centuries and is unique to Burmese cuisine.

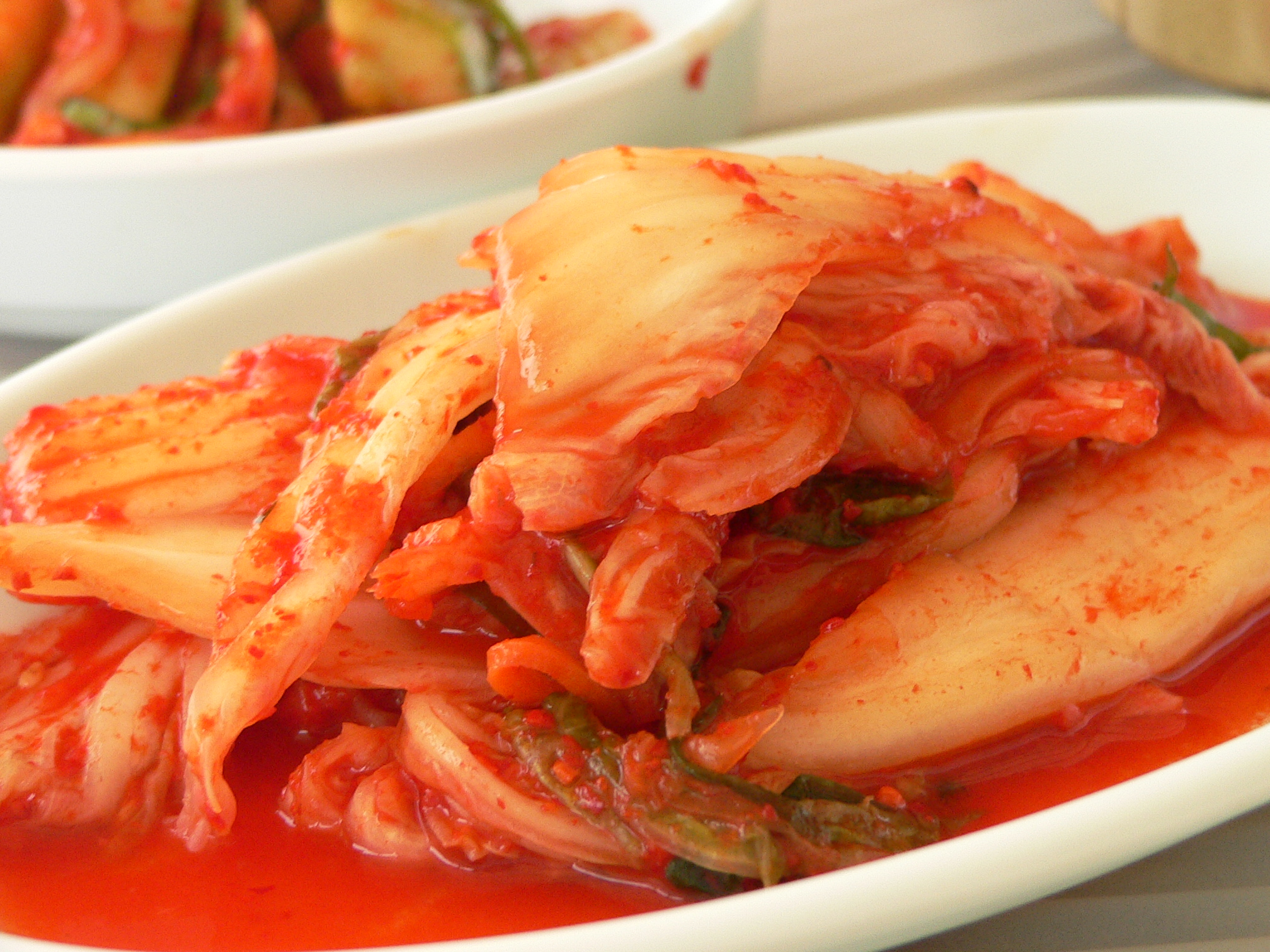
Kimchi is a very common side dish in Korea.

==== East Asia ====
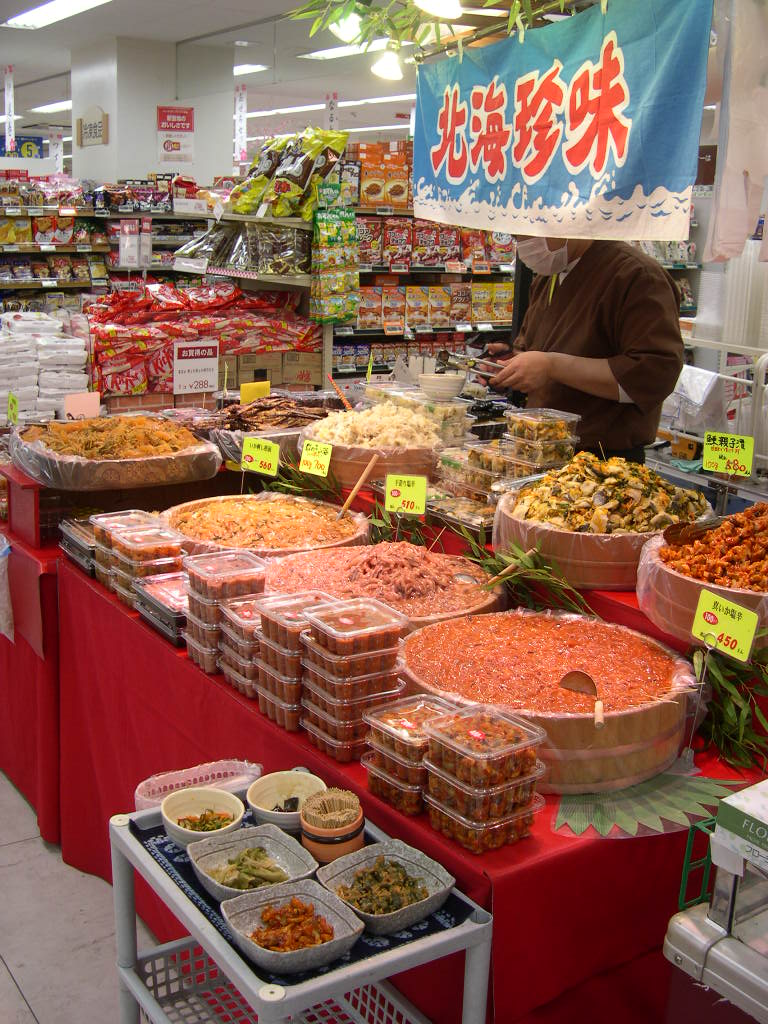
Japanese pickle stall

A wide variety of foods are pickled throughout East Asia. The pickles are often sweet, salty, and/or spicy and preserved in sweetened solutions or oil.

China is home to first documented origins of fermented salt pickles, based upon a poem written around 7th century BCE. Pickling then spread across Asia, concerning a large variety of vegetables, including radish, baicai (Chinese cabbage, notably suan cai, pao cai, and Tianjin preserved vegetable), zha cai, chili pepper (e.g. duo jiao), and cucumbers, among many others.

Japanese tsukemono (pickled foods) are made from a variety of techniques, the oldest and easiest being Shio-zuke which translates to salt pickles. This method tends to be the most widely used, and a version of this method called ichiyazuke (overnight pickle) which as the name indicates is a sped-up pickling process (using salt) that can be completed overnight and ready to serve the next day. Umeboshi, another salt-preserved tsukemono, is known as the Japanese plum but taste-wise is closer in comparison to an apricot. 'Boshi' stems off the root verb meaning "to dry" because after the umeboshi is pickled, it dries out in sunlight for 3-5 days (although some recipes recommend putting the fruit back into brine at night, to prevent molding).

One of the most notable pickled foods is kimchi, a Korean side dish made of pickled vegetables. Kimchi primarily consists of napa cabbage (baechu) but is also commonly mixed with radish, green onions, garlic, ginger and red chili powder.

=== Europe ===
==== Central and Eastern Europe ====
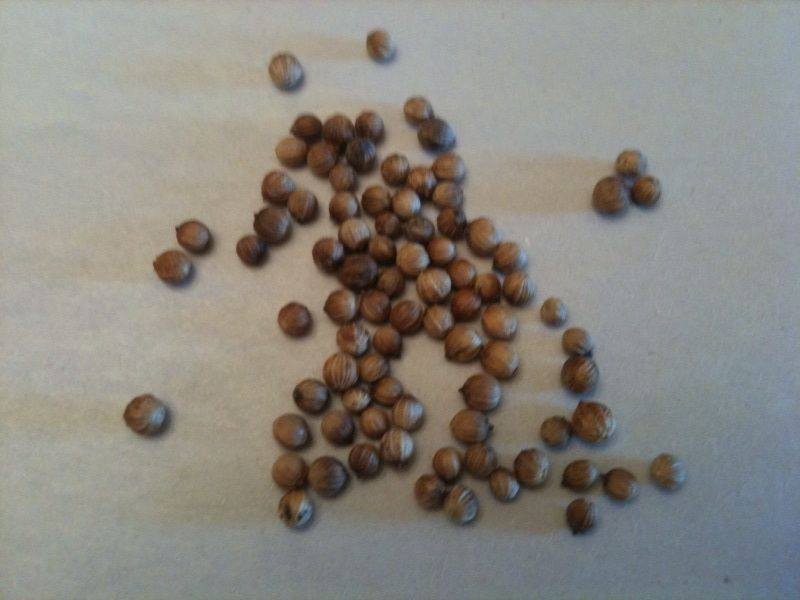
Coriander seeds are one of the spices popularly added to pickled vegetables in Europe.

In Hungary, traditionally main courses usually include some kind of pickles (savanyúság), but pickles are also commonly consumed at other times of the day. The most commonly consumed pickles are sauerkraut (savanyú káposzta), pickled cucumbers and peppers, and csalamádé, but tomatoes, carrots, beetroot, baby corn, onions, garlic, certain squashes and melons, and a few fruits such as plums and apples are also used. Stuffed pickles are specialties, usually made of peppers or melons pickled after being stuffed with a cabbage filling. Pickled plum stuffed with garlic is a unique Hungarian type of pickle just like csalamádé and leavened cucumber (kovászos uborka). Csalamádé is a mixed pickle of cabbage, cucumber, paprika, onion, carrot, tomatoes, and bay leaf mixed up with vinegar as the fermenting agent. Leavened cucumber, unlike other types of pickled cucumbers that are around all year long, is a seasonal pickle produced in the summer. Cucumbers, spices, herbs, and slices of bread are put in a glass jar with salt water and kept in direct sunlight for a few days. Yeast from the bread, along with other pickling agents and spices fermented under the hot sun, give the cucumbers a unique flavor, texture, and a slight carbonation. Its juice can be used instead of carbonated water to make a special type of spritzer (újházy fröccs). It is common for Hungarian households to produce their own pickles. Different regions or towns have their special recipes unique to them. Vecsési sauerkraut (vecsési savanyú káposzta) is the most famous.

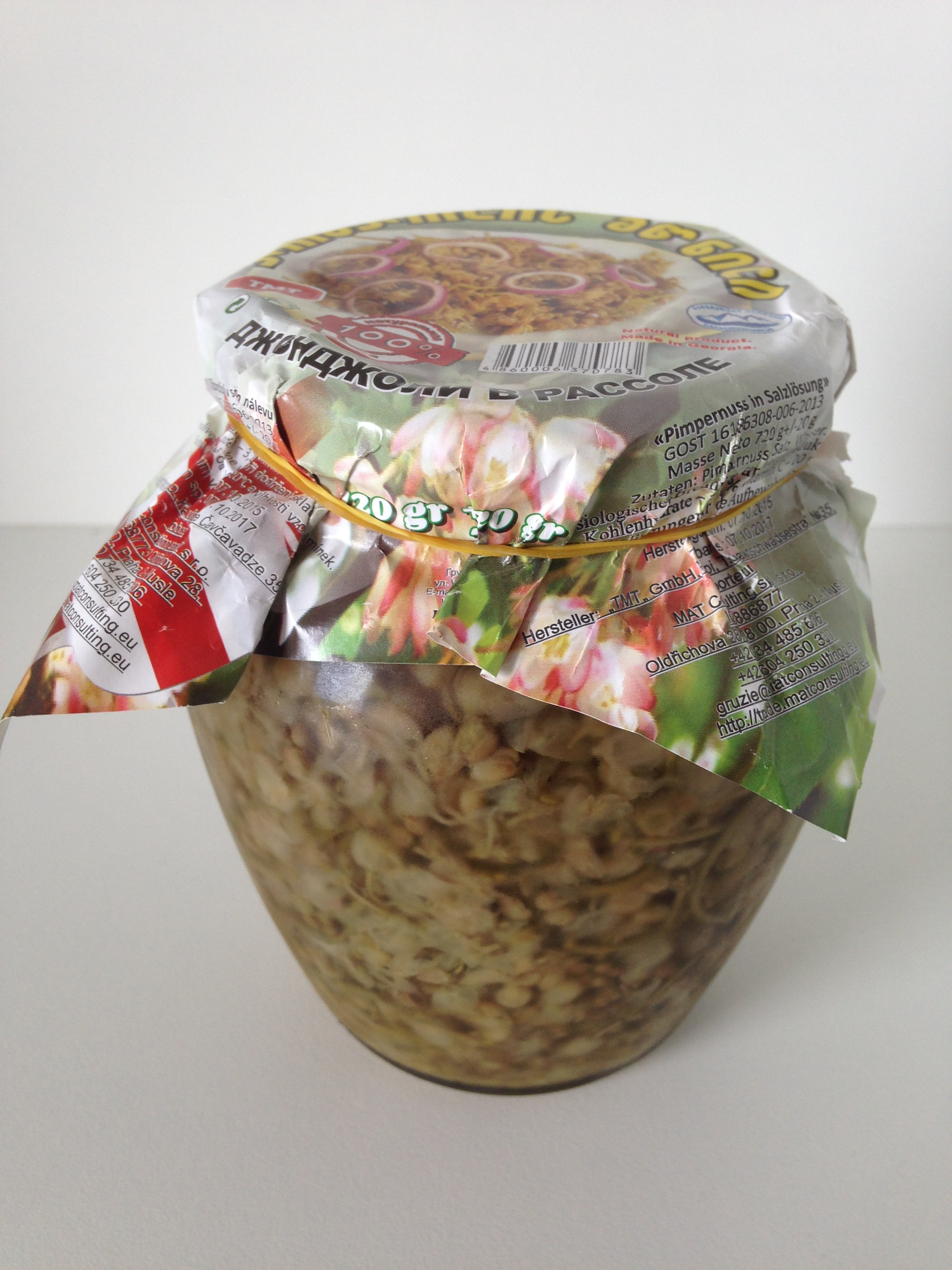
Jonjoli Georgian pickled flowers of bladdernut

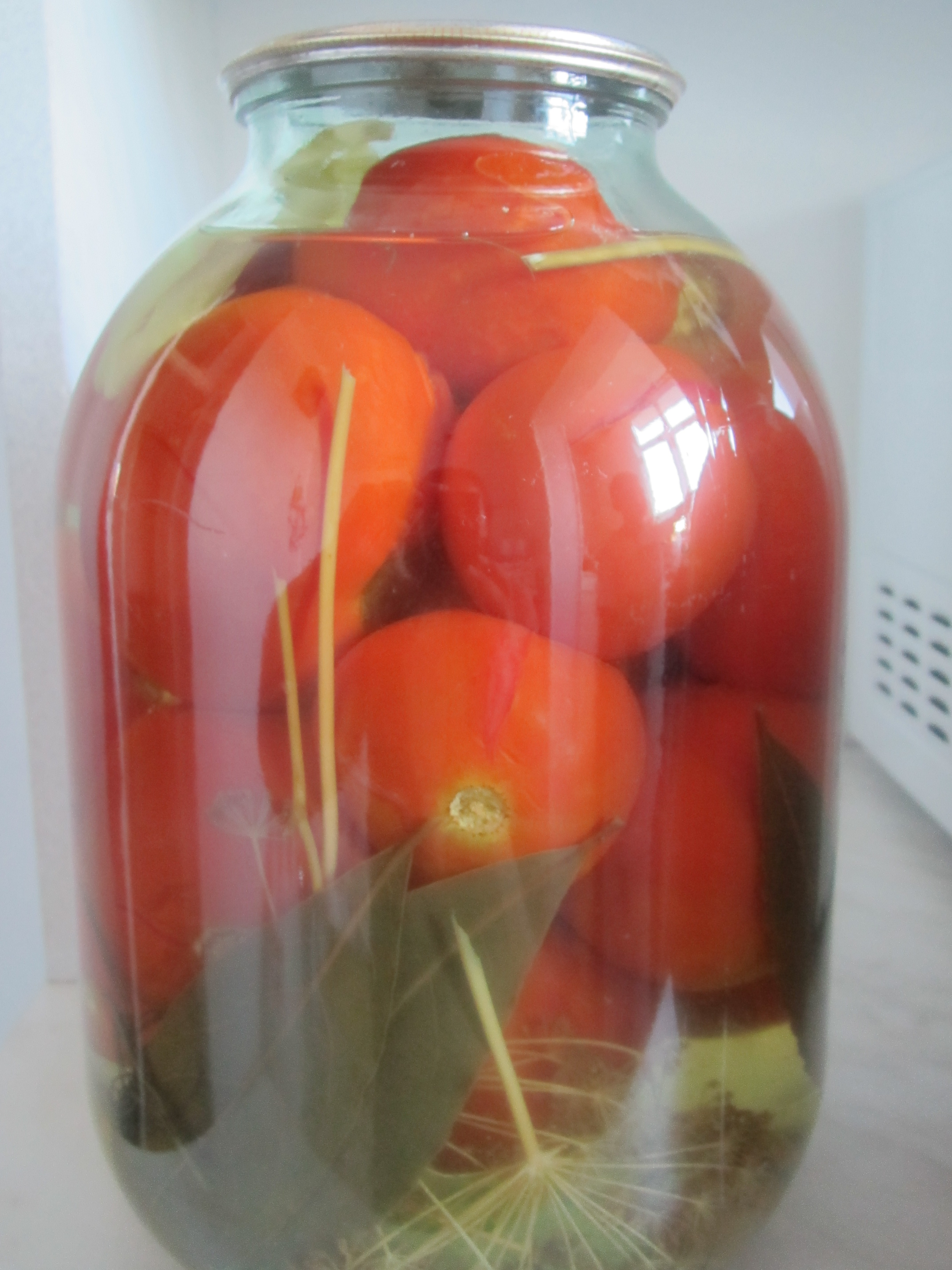
Pickled tomatoes are common in the post-Soviet states

Romanian pickles (murături) are made from beetroot, cucumbers, green tomatoes (gogonele), carrots, cabbage, garlic, sauerkraut, bell peppers, melons, mushrooms, turnips, celery and cauliflower. Meat, such as pork, can be preserved in salt and lard.

Polish cuisine is centered around pickled foods. Pickled gherkins are enjoyed in a multitude of ways; a snack, a sidedish, a 'chaser' for vodka, and are also often used in pickled-gherkin soup.

Czech cuisine incorporates many pickled fruits and vegetables as a way to preserve produce that in their climate are mostly seasonal. A unique aspect of Czech cuisine is 'beer cheese', cheese that is pickled in beer. The popular bar snack, utopenec, is sausage pickled with onions. Other vegetables, such as peppers and cucumbers, are also found pickled with utopenec.

In Slovak tradition, pickling practices are quite similar to ones used in the Czech Republic. June and July is prime pickling season in Slovakia, where most people are bottling up their fruits and vegetables to preserve for the winter.

In Albania and Albanian cuisine it is known as turshi (Albanian: turshi), and is commonly consumed as an appetizer or side dish. It is traditionally prepared in late summer and autumn for consumption during the winter months. Vegetables such as green tomatoes, cucumbers, bell peppers, cabbage and eggplant are preserved in a brine or vinegar solution. It is sometimes served as a meze alongside rakia.

In Macedonian cuisine, it is a popular appetizer, traditionally prepared in the fall, and enjoyed throughout winter as a side dish to hearty stews. In Bulgarian cuisine, the most popular types are tsarska turshiya ("king's pickle") and selska turshiya ("country pickle").

North Caucasian, Russian, Ukrainian and Belarusian pickled items include beets, mushrooms, tomatoes, sauerkraut, cucumbers, ramsons, garlic, eggplant (typically stuffed with julienned carrots), custard squash, and watermelon. Garden produce is commonly pickled using salt, dill, blackcurrant leaves, bay leaves and garlic and stored in a cool, dark place. The leftover brine (called rassol (рассол) in Russian) has a number of culinary uses in these countries, especially for cooking traditional soups, such as shchi, rassolnik, and solyanka. Rassol, especially cucumber or sauerkraut rassol, is also a favorite traditional remedy against morning hangover.

==== Southern Europe ====
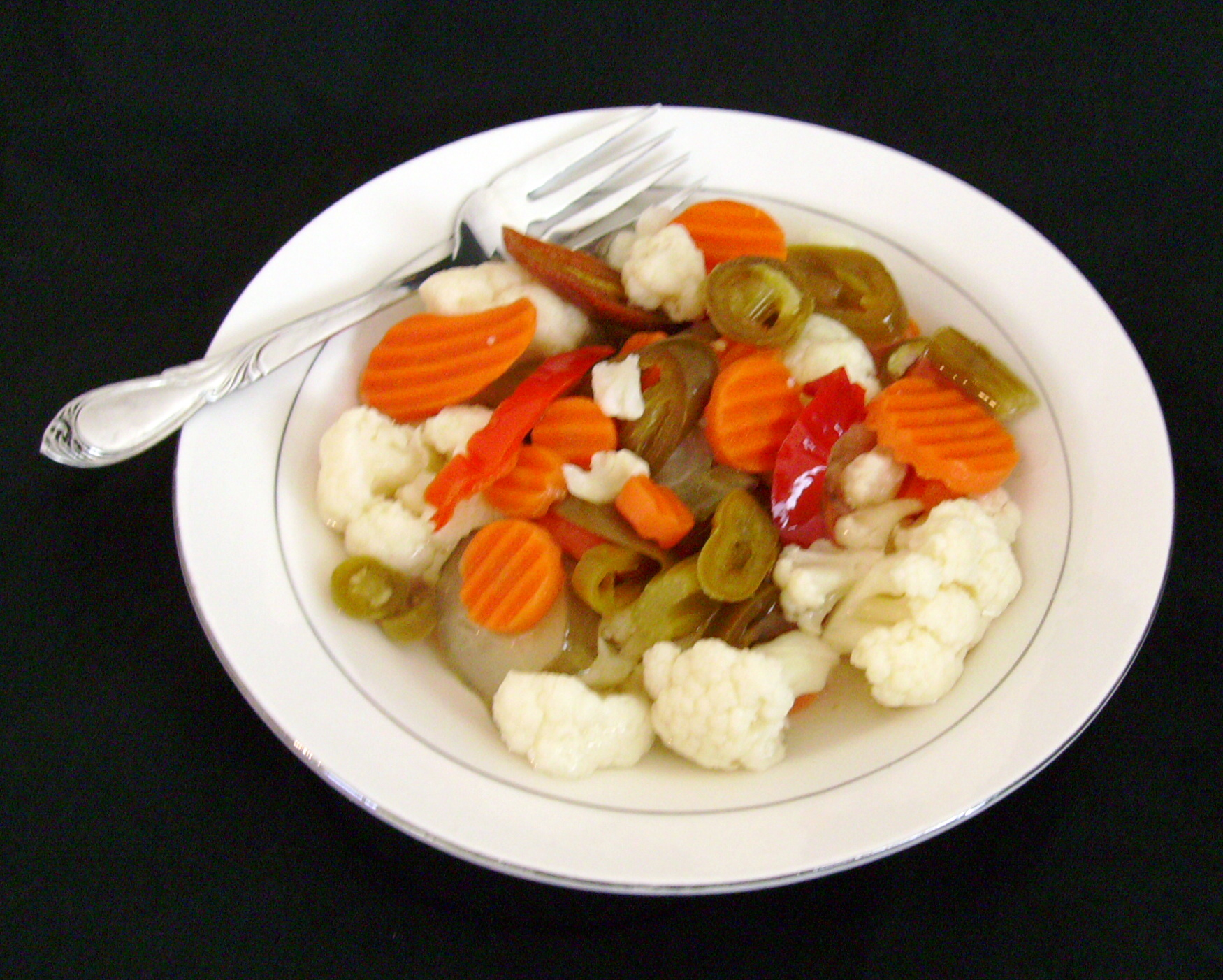
A dish of giardiniera

An Italian pickled vegetable dish is giardiniera, which comes from the root word "giardino" and translates in English to garden. Typical inclusions to giardiniera are carrots, celery, peppers, onions, cauliflower and whatever other vegetables were found in the garden.

In the Middle East and Balkan Region, pickled vegetables (most commonly used are peppers, carrots and cauliflower) are known regionally as turshi, tursija, torshi or turshu. This dish can be enjoyed on its own, in sandwiches or salads, and as a side to popular dishes like Lahm Bi Ajeen. In Greece, pickles, called τουρσί (pronounced toursi) are made out of carrots, celery, eggplants stuffed with diced carrots, cauliflower, tomatoes, and peppers.

In Spain, pickles, known as "encurtidos", are mainly made with olives, cucumbers, onions and green peppers ("guindillas" or "piparras"). "Banderillas" are small pieces of pickled cucumber and green pepper, along with olives and anchovies, mounted into toothpicks, and are very popular as Tapas.

==== Northern Europe ====
In Britain, pickled onions and pickled eggs are often sold in pubs and fish and chips shops. Pickled beetroot, walnuts, and gherkins, and condiments such as Branston Pickle and piccalilli are typically eaten as an accompaniment to pork pies and cold meats, sandwiches or a ploughman's lunch. Other popular pickles in the UK are pickled mussels, cockles, red cabbage, mango chutney, sauerkraut, and olives. Rollmops are also quite widely available under a range of names from various producers both within and out of the UK.

Pickled fish, specifically herring and salmon, are popular in Scandinavia. Pickled cucumbers, beets and radishes are used as condiments for several traditional dishes. Pickled capers are also common in Scandinavian cuisine.

=== North America ===
In the United States and Canada, pickled cucumbers (most often referred to simply as "pickles"), olives, and sauerkraut are most commonly seen, although pickles common in other nations are also very widely available. In Canada and the US, there may be a distinction made between gherkins (usually smaller), and pickles (larger pickled cucumbers).

Sweet pickles made with fruit are more common in the cuisine of the American South. The pickling "syrup" is made with vinegar, brown sugar, and whole spices such as cinnamon sticks, allspice and cloves. Fruit pickles can be made with an assortment of fruits including watermelon, cantaloupe, Concord grapes and peaches.

Canadian pickling is similar to that of Britain. Through the winter, pickling is an important method of food preservation. Pickled cucumbers, onions, and eggs are common. Pickled egg and pickled sausage make popular pub snacks in much of English Canada. Chow-chow is a tart vegetable mix popular in the Maritime Provinces and the Southern United States, similar to piccalilli. Pickled fish is commonly seen, as in Scotland, and kippers may be seen for breakfast, as well as plentiful smoked salmon. Meat is often also pickled or preserved in different brines throughout the winter, most prominently in the harsh climate of Newfoundland.

Pickled eggs are common in many regions of the United States. Pickled herring is available in the Upper Midwest. Giardiniera, a mixture of pickled peppers, celery and olives, is a popular condiment in Chicago and other Midwestern cities with large Italian-American populations, and is often consumed with Italian beef sandwiches.

Pennsylvania Dutch Country has a strong tradition of pickled foods, including chow-chow and red beet eggs. In the Southern United States, pickled okra and watermelon rind are popular, as are deep-fried pickles and pickled pig's feet, pickled chicken eggs, pickled quail eggs, pickled garden vegetables and pickled sausage.

Various pickled vegetables, fish, or eggs may make a side dish to a Canadian lunch or dinner. Popular pickles in the Pacific Northwest include pickled asparagus and green beans. Pickled fruits like blueberries and early green strawberries are paired with meat dishes in restaurants.

==== Thanksgiving ====
Pickles were part of Thanksgiving dinner traditions as early as 1827. The first mention of pickles at Thanksgiving comes from Sarah Josepha Hale's novel Northwood. (Hale is best known for her successful campaign to have Thanksgiving recognized as a national holiday in the United States.) Pickled peaches, coleslaw and other mixed pickles continue to be served alongside cranberry sauce at Thanksgiving dinner in present times.

=== Mexico, Central America, and South America ===
In Mexico, chili peppers, particularly of the Jalapeño and serrano varieties, are pickled with vegetables such as onions and carrots. Pickled peppers are canned and sold in supermarkets under the name "en escabeche."

In the Mesoamerican region, pickling is known as encurtido or "curtido" for short. The pickles or "curtidos" as known in Latin America are served cold, as an appetizer, as a side dish or as a tapas dish in Spain. In several Central American countries it is prepared with cabbage, onions, carrots, lemon, vinegar, oregano, and salt. In Mexico, "curtido" consists of carrots, onions, and jalapeño peppers and used to accompany meals common in taquerías and restaurants.

== Process ==
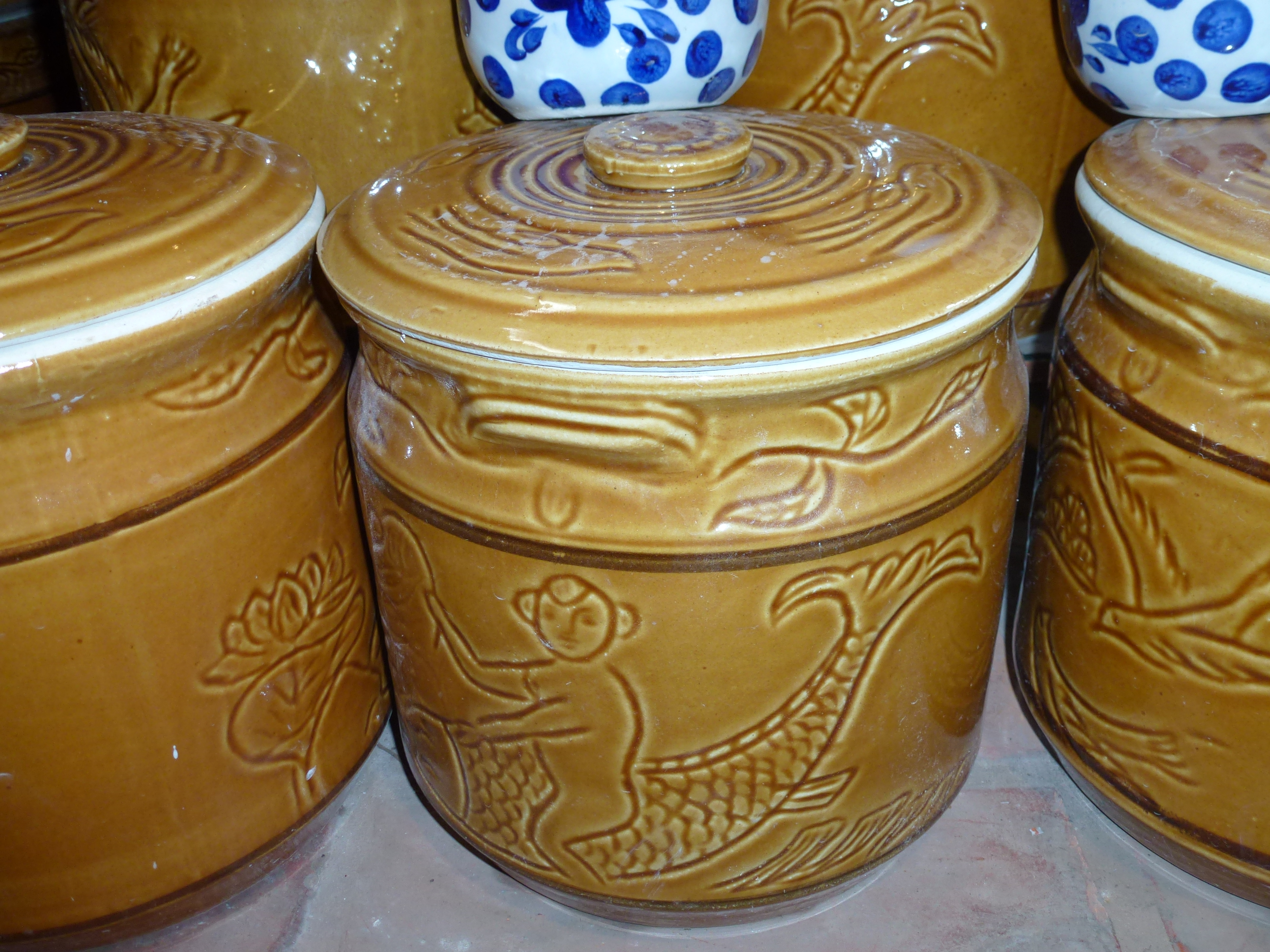
Bát Tràng porcelain vessel for pickling

In traditional pickling, fruit or vegetables are submerged in brine (20–40 grams/L of salt (3.2–6.4 oz/imp gal or 2.7–5.3 oz/US gal)), or shredded and salted as in sauerkraut preparation, and held underwater by flat stones layered on top. Alternatively, a lid with an airtrap or a tight lid may be used if the lid is able to release pressure which may result from carbon dioxide buildup. Mold or (white) kahm yeast may form on the surface; kahm yeast is mostly harmless but can impart an off taste and may be removed without affecting the pickling process.

In chemical pickling, the fruits or vegetables to be pickled are placed in a sterilized jar along with brine, vinegar, or both, as well as spices, and are then allowed to mature until the desired taste is obtained.

The food can be pre-soaked in brine before transferring to vinegar. This reduces the water content of the food, which would otherwise dilute the vinegar. This method is particularly useful for fruit and vegetables with a high natural water content.

In commercial pickling, a preservative such as sodium benzoate or EDTA may also be added to enhance shelf life. In fermentation pickling, the food itself produces the preservation agent, typically by a process involving Lactobacillus bacteria that produce lactic acid as the preservative agent.

Alum (aluminum sulfate) is used in pickling to promote crisp texture and is approved, though not recommended, as a food additive by the United States Food and Drug Administration. Another common crisping agent is calcium chloride, which evolved from the practice of using pickling lime. See also firming agent.

"Refrigerator pickles" are unfermented pickles made by marinating fruit or vegetables in a seasoned vinegar solution. They must be stored under refrigeration or undergo canning to achieve long-term storage.

Japanese Tsukemono use a variety of pickling ingredients depending on their type, and are produced by combining these ingredients with the vegetables to be preserved and putting the mixture under pressure.

== Possible health hazards of pickled vegetables ==
In 1993, the World Health Organization listed traditional Asian pickled vegetables as possible carcinogens, and the British Journal of Cancer released an online 2009 meta-analysis of research on pickles as increasing the risks of esophageal cancer. The report, citing limited data in a statistical meta-analysis, indicates a potential twofold increased risk of esophageal cancer associated with Asian pickled vegetable consumption. Results from the research are described as having "high heterogeneity" and the study results indicated that further well-designed prospective studies were warranted. However, according to the authors, "The majority of subgroup analyses showed a statistically significant association between consuming pickled vegetables and Oesophageal Squamous Cell Carcinoma".

A 2020 meta analysis of stomach cancer risk factors also found a positive correlation between pickled vegetable consumption and stomach cancer.

The 2009 meta-analysis reported heavy infestation of pickled vegetables with fungi. Some common fungi can facilitate the formation of N-nitroso compounds, which are strong esophageal carcinogens in several animal models. Roussin red methyl ester, a non-alkylating nitroso compound with tumour-promoting effect in vitro, was identified in pickles from Linzhou, Henan (formerly Linxian) in much higher concentrations than in samples from low-incidence areas. Fumonisin mycotoxins have been shown to cause liver and kidney tumours in rodents.

A 2017 study in the Chinese Journal of Cancer has linked salted vegetables (zha cai, common in Chinese cuisine) to a fourfold increase in nasopharynx cancer. The researchers believe possible mechanisms include production of nitrosamines (a type of N-nitroso compound) by fermentation and activation of Epstein–Barr virus by fermentation products.

Historically, pickling caused health concerns for reasons associated with copper salts, as explained in the mid-19th century The English and Australian Cookery Book: "The evidence of the Lancet commissioner (Dr. Hassall) and Mr. Blackwell (of the eminent firm of Crosse and Blackwell) went to prove that the pickles sold in the shops are nearly always artificially coloured, and are thus rendered highly unwholesome, if not actually poisonous."

=== Risk reduction ===
Reduction of suspected carcinogens from pickled products is a subject of active research.

- Fungi are of interest both for spoilage prevention and reduction of mycotoxins. Some pickle cultures are said to contain bacteria producing natural antifungals.
- Nitrites, responsible for the creation of N-nitroso compounds, are reduced by low pH and/or high temperature. Inclusion of a porcini enzyme (or the whole mushroom) also reduces nitrite content.

While some pickled vegetables have potential health risks, certain pickled foods, such as olives, retain beneficial nutrients. Pickled olives contain monounsaturated fats, antioxidants, and essential minerals, though their sodium content can be high due to the brining process.

=== Pop culture ===
Pickling experienced a resurgence on social media during the COVID-19 pandemic in the early 2020s and has remained a popular online topic since. The renewed interest in pickling has been largely driven by Gen Z. On social media platforms like TikTok, pickle and pickling-related content has accumulated a combined 9.6 billion views as of August 2025. The growth in popularity can be attributed to social media trends such as "Girl Dinner", fried cheese and pickle wraps, and the "Hot Pickle Challenge". Music singer Dua Lipa posted a video which showed her combining diet soda with pickles and jalapeños, which got 15.8 million views. Fermentation expert Ruth Munro of the Edinburgh Fermentarium attributes the trend's growth to three main factors: a desire to reduce food waste, increasingly adventurous palates, and perceived health benefits.

== Gallery ==
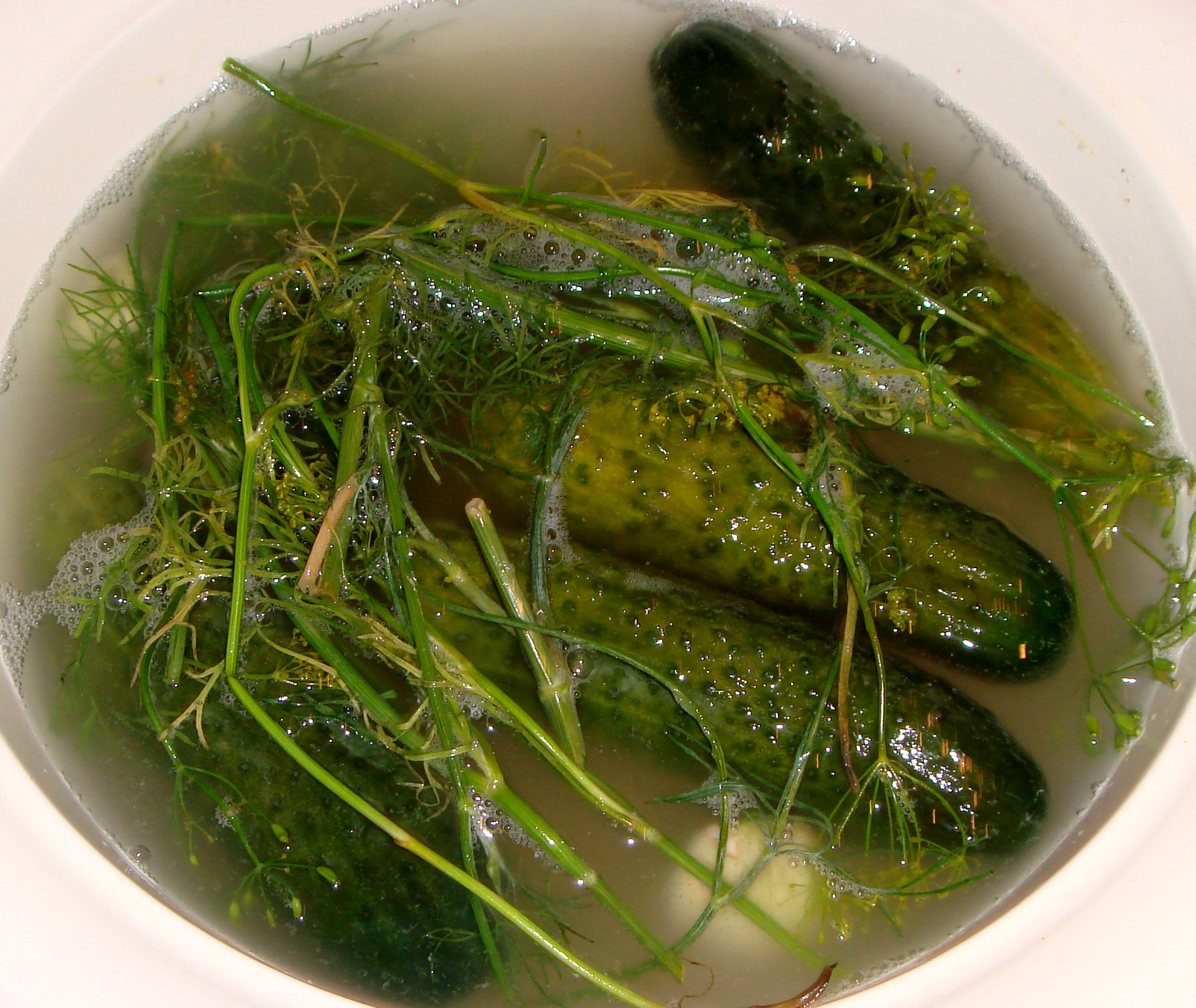
Pickled cucumbers

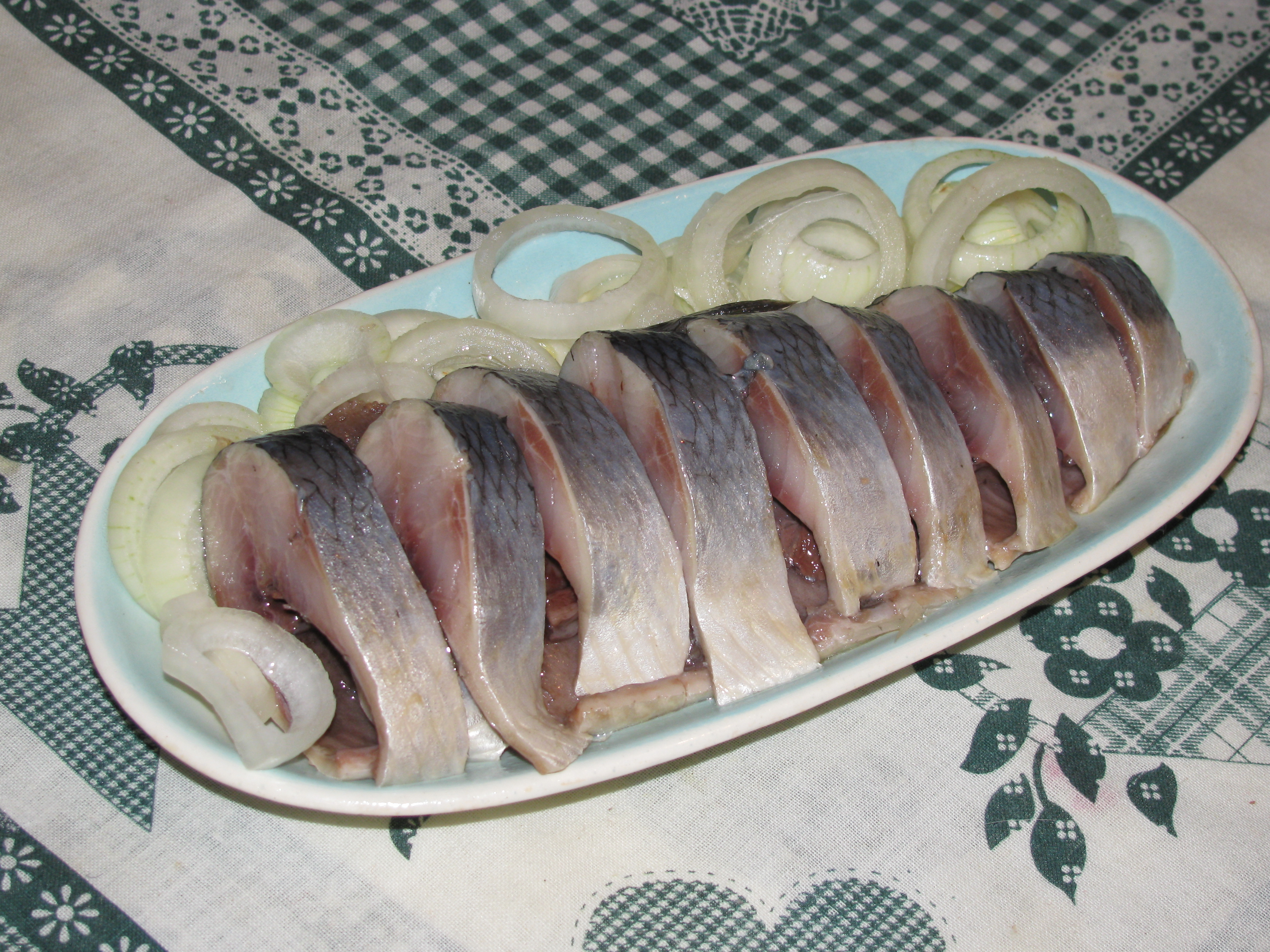
Pickled herring

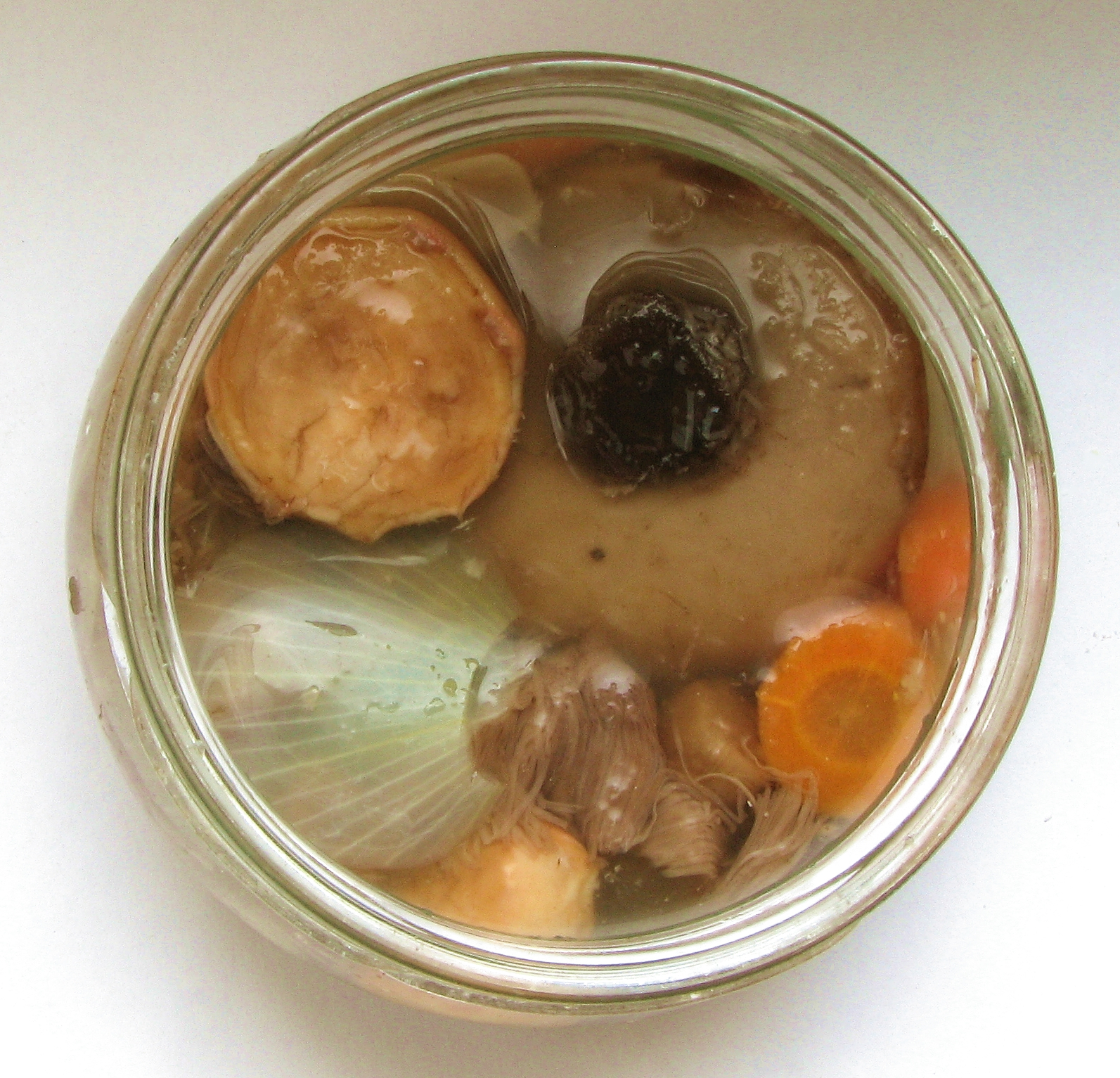
Pickled mushrooms

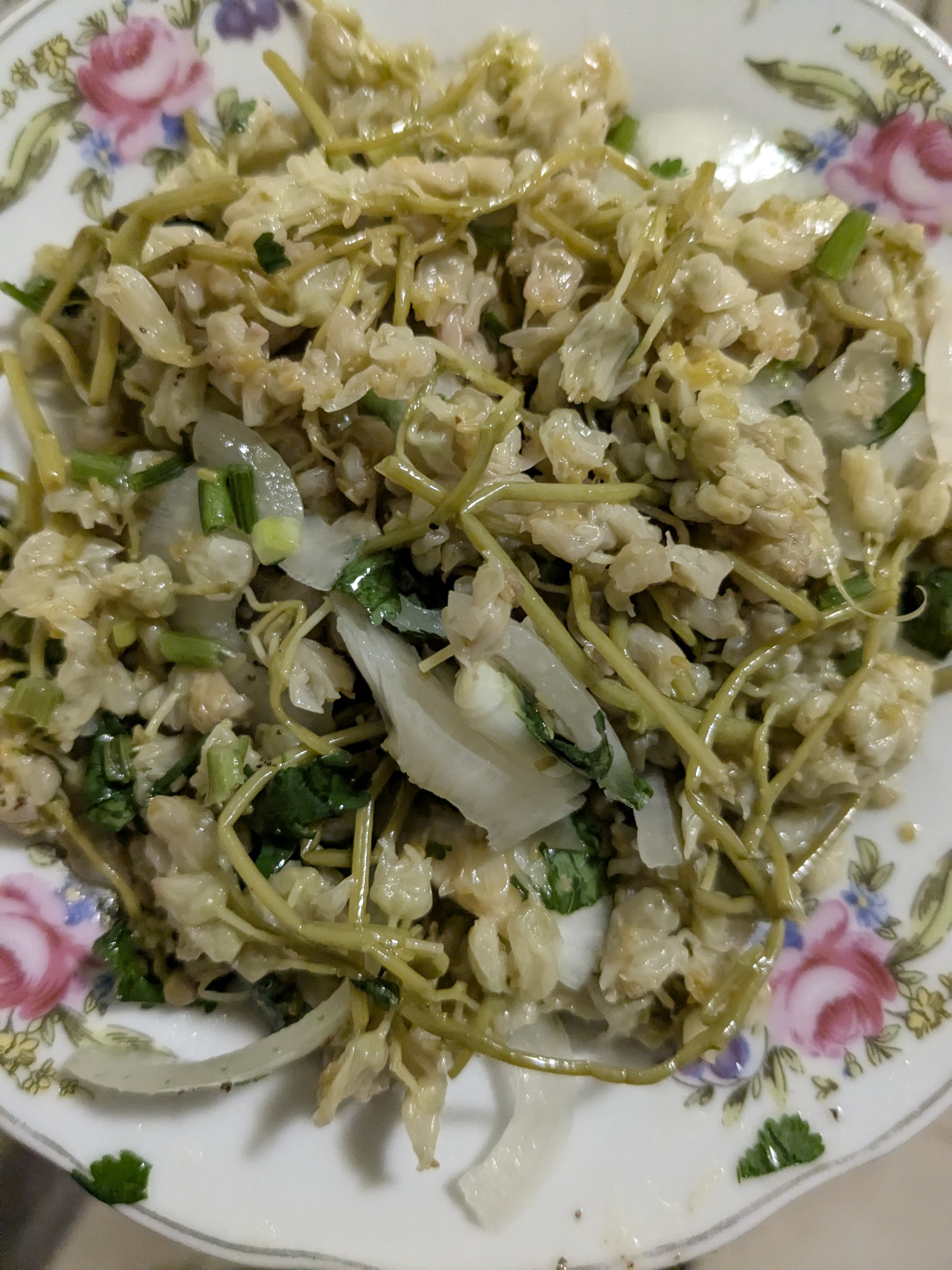
Pickled bladdernut flower

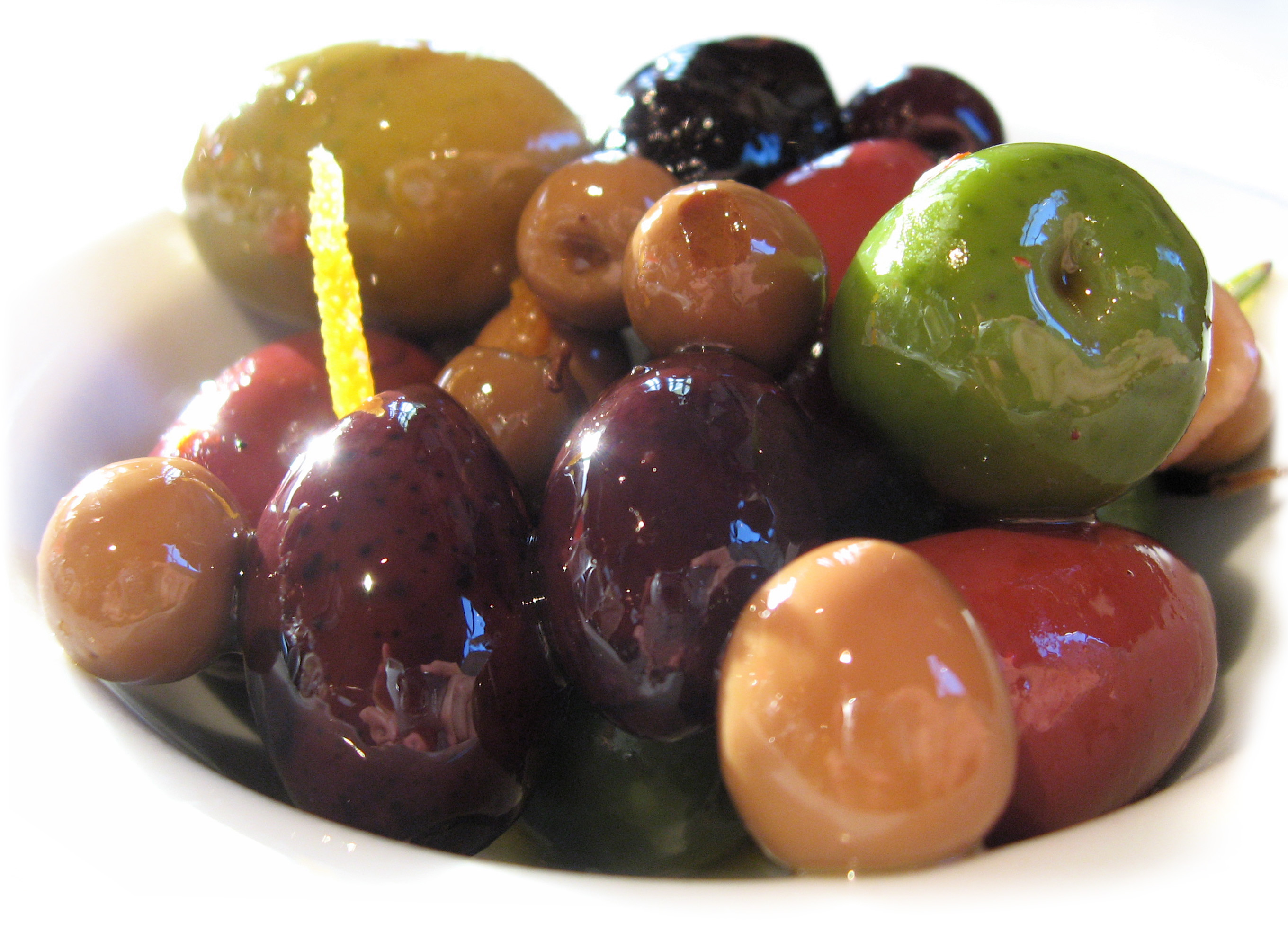
Pickled olives

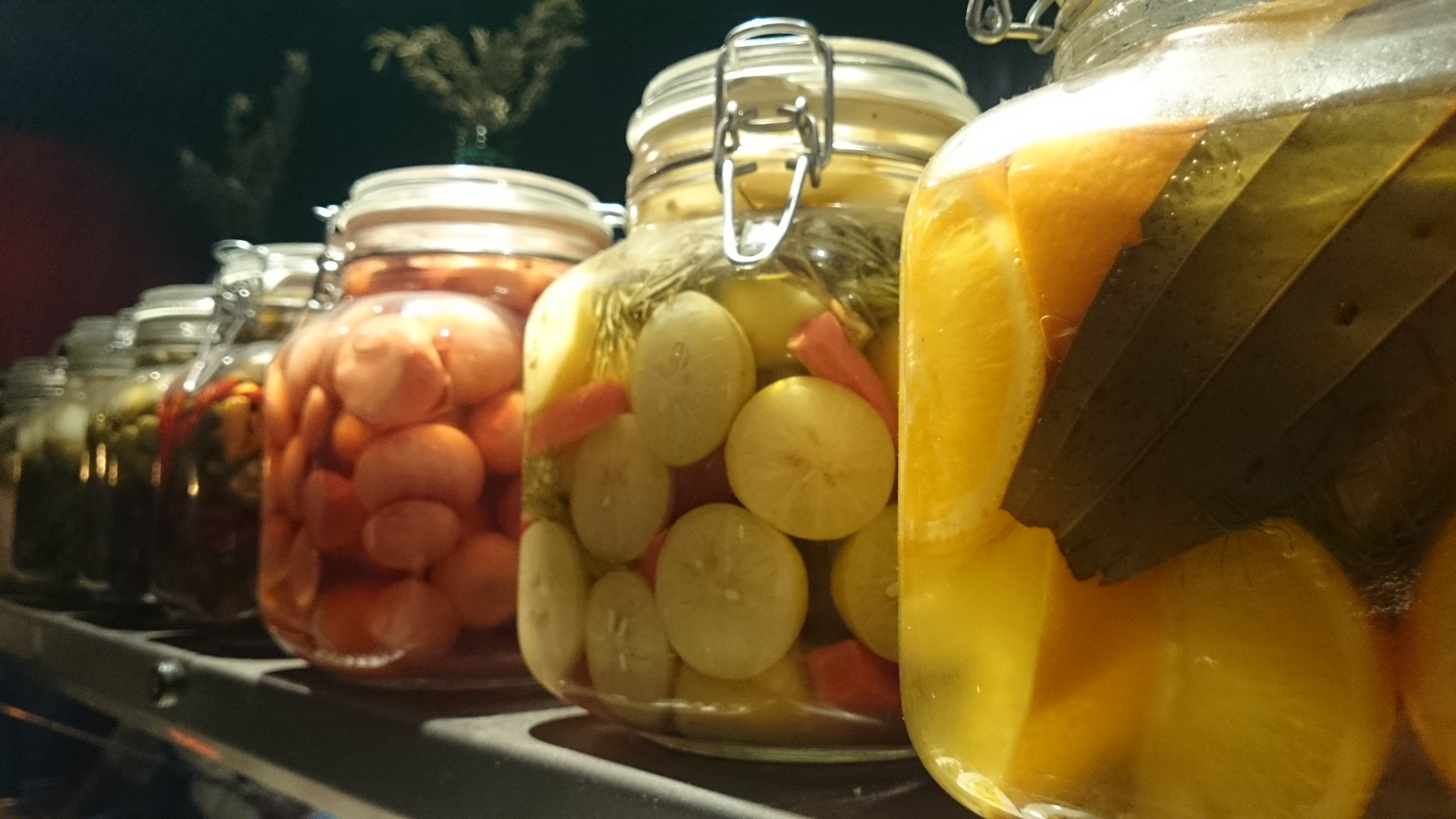
Pickled vegetables

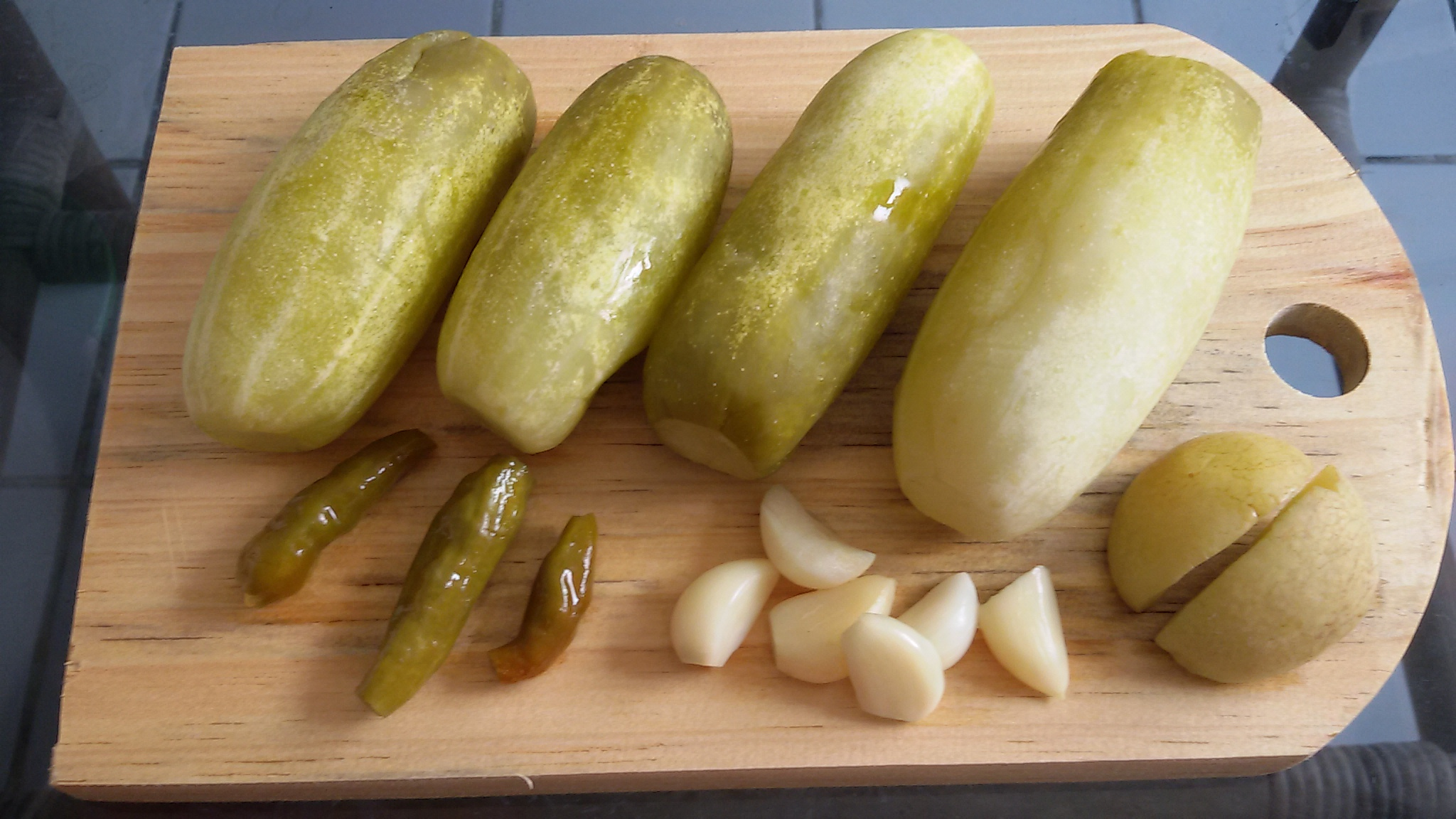
Fermented homemade pickled cucumber, chili pepper, garlic, and apple in the hot climate of Indonesia

== See also ==
- Brining – Food processing by treating with brine or salt
- Curing (food preservation)
- Fermentation in food processing – Converting carbohydrates to alcohol or acids using anaerobic microorganisms
- Home canning – Process for preserving foods for storage
- List of pickled foods
- Marination – Process of soaking foods in a seasoned, often acidic, liquid before cooking
- Mixed pickle
- Pickling salt – Fine-grained salt used for manufacturing pickles
- Smoking (cooking)
