= Pickled egg =

Hard-boiled eggs cured in vinegar or brine

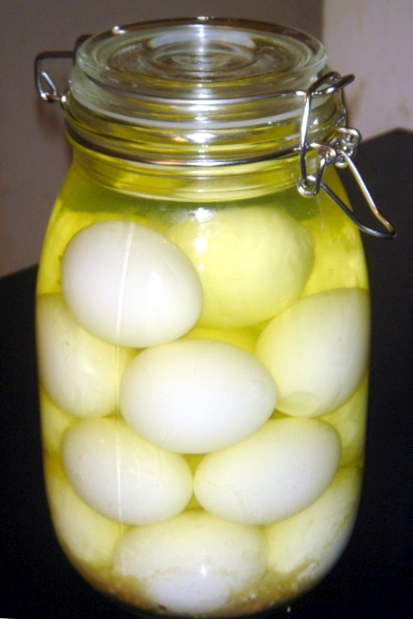
- Course: Hors d'œuvre
- Main ingredients: Hard-boiled egg, cured in vinegar or brine

Nutritional value per 1 egg
- Energy: 334 kJ (80 kcal)
- Fat: 5.5 g
- Saturated: 2 g
- Protein: 7.5 g
Vitamins and minerals
| Minerals | Quantity %DV^{†} |
| Sodium | 2% 56 mg |
- Other constituents: Quantity
- Cholesterol: 210 mg
- ^{†}Percentages estimated using US recommendations for adults. Source: Calorie King

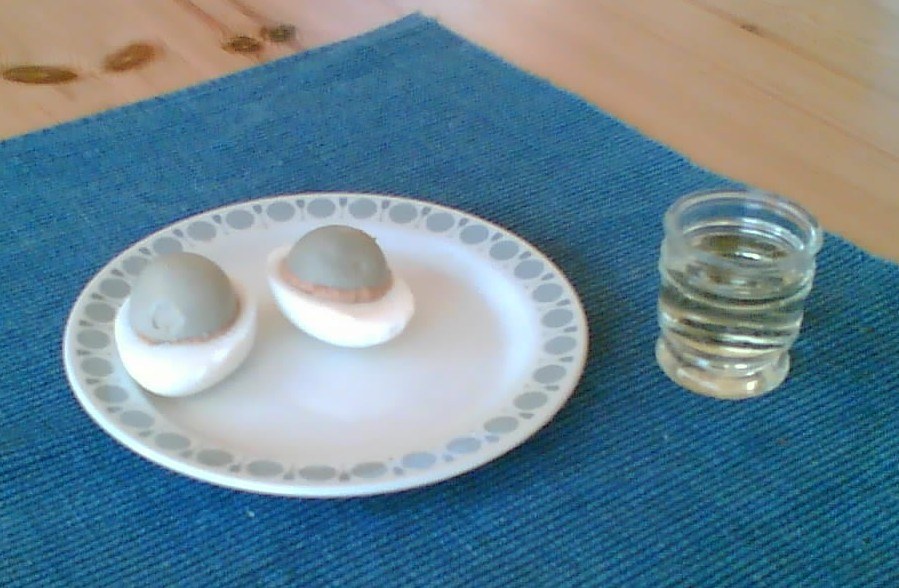
Solæg (Danish pickled eggs) and snaps

Pickled eggs are typically hard-boiled eggs that are cured in vinegar or brine. As with many foods, this was originally a way to preserve the food so that it could be eaten months later. Pickled eggs have since become a favorite among many as a snack or hors d'œuvre popular in pubs, bars, and taverns, and around the world in places where beer is served.

After the eggs are hard-boiled, the shell is removed and they are submerged in a solution of vinegar, salt, spices, and other seasonings. Recipes vary from the traditional brine solution for pickles to other solutions, which can impart a sweet or spicy taste.

The final taste is mostly determined by the pickling solution. The eggs are left in this solution from one day to several months. Prolonged exposure to the pickling solution may result in a rubbery texture. Care should be taken to prepare the eggs properly to avoid food poisoning.

Pickled eggs may be served as part of a main course, hors d'œuvres, or garnishes.

== Recipes ==
=== United States ===
A variant historically associated with the Pennsylvania Dutch is the pickled beet egg where whole beets, onions, vinegar, sugar, salt, cloves, and (optionally) a cinnamon stick are used as the brine. The eggs take on a pink or even purple color from the beets and have a sweet and sour taste. Pickled red beet eggs, long a common food at picnics and pot-lucks in the Pennsylvania Dutch country, have diffused into the folk cuisine of the surrounding "English" and become a popular snack that can be bought in supermarkets as far east as the Delaware River.

=== England ===
A typical British recipe for pickled eggs includes eggs, vinegar, salt, and sugar. The eggs are first boiled, peeled, then boiled with the other ingredients. They last for three to four months (for best quality) and are traditionally found in British public houses and fish and chip shops.

== History ==
=== Germany ===
In Germany, pickled eggs (Soleier, literally "brine eggs") were commonly made and eaten. German emigrants took this practice with them when they moved to the New World.

During Lent, many Christian denominations forbade the consumption of eggs. However, hens would continue to lay eggs, and pickling provided a practical way to preserve them until Easter.

=== United States ===
In the early 18th century, the Amish, a group of German-speaking Anabaptist refugees, brought their particular variation of the pickled egg to Pennsylvania: the pickled beet egg, where beets were added to the recipe turning the eggs a pinkish color. The beets add a contrast in flavor, creating both a sweet and sour taste. In the 1940s, pickled eggs became very popular, as they were advertised in newspapers as lollipops, and wives were encouraged to make them on a skewer as a creative appetizer.

In Wisconsin in November 1959, Hingham and Gibbsville students held a Veterans Day celebration in the area. Larry Shaver dressed up as Mr. H.D. Hyde, to honor him as the leader of Hingham's egg industry while shipping over 10 rail carloads of pickled eggs at one time. Pickled eggs were popular around Easter as an added way to celebrate the season.

Today, pretzels and chips are a more common snack for a restaurant and bars, but pickled eggs are still found in rural locations in the United States and presented in a jar at some bars.

== Serving pickled eggs ==
The traditional method of eating pickled eggs is with salt and pepper. People will often add food coloring to the solution so that they are more festive. They are also commonly eaten on avocado toast as well as in an egg salad. Pickled eggs can be served wherever hard-boiled eggs are served. For example, they can be used to make pickled deviled eggs or grated over asparagus or salads.

== See also ==
- Century egg – Chinese preserved egg
- Salted duck egg – Traditional Asian dish common in several regions
- Food preservation – Inhibition of microbial growth in food
- Food safety – Scientific discipline
- Iron egg – Egg-based dish from Taiwan
- Tea egg – Egg boiled in tea as a savory snack
