= Pickled beet egg =

Egg dish

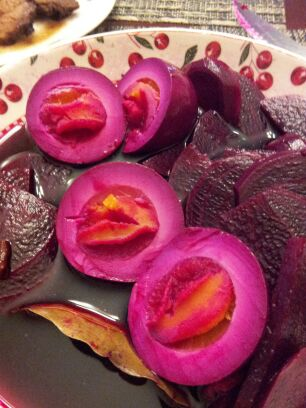
- Pickled beet egg
- Main ingredients: Egg
- Ingredients generally used: Beets, beet juice, vinegar, sugar, cloves and other spices
- Variations: Cider vinegar, brown sugar
- Food energy (per 100 g serving): 108 kcal (450 kJ)
Nutritional value
(per 100 g serving)
- Protein: 6.6g g
- Fat: 5.3g g
- Carbohydrate: 8.1g g

Nutrition Information
Calories	108 kcal
Total fat	5.3 g
Cholesterol	212 mg
Sodium	112 mg
Total carbs	8.1 g
Dietary fiber	0.5 g
Protein	6.6 g

Pickled beet eggs are hard boiled eggs that are cured in a brine of beets, beet juice, vinegar, sugar, cloves and other spices. There are many regional variations to this classic dish; for instance, some recipes substitute cider vinegar for white vinegar, and brown sugar for white sugar. Pickled beet eggs are easy to make and have a rich pink color after only a day.

== See also ==
- Pickled egg – Hard-boiled eggs cured in vinegar or brine
- Century egg – Chinese egg-based culinary dish
- Tea egg – Egg boiled in tea as a savory snack
