= Demographics of Hispanic and Latino Americans =

Proportion of Americans who are Hispanic or Latino in each U.S. state, the District of Columbia, and Puerto Rico as of the 2020 United States Census

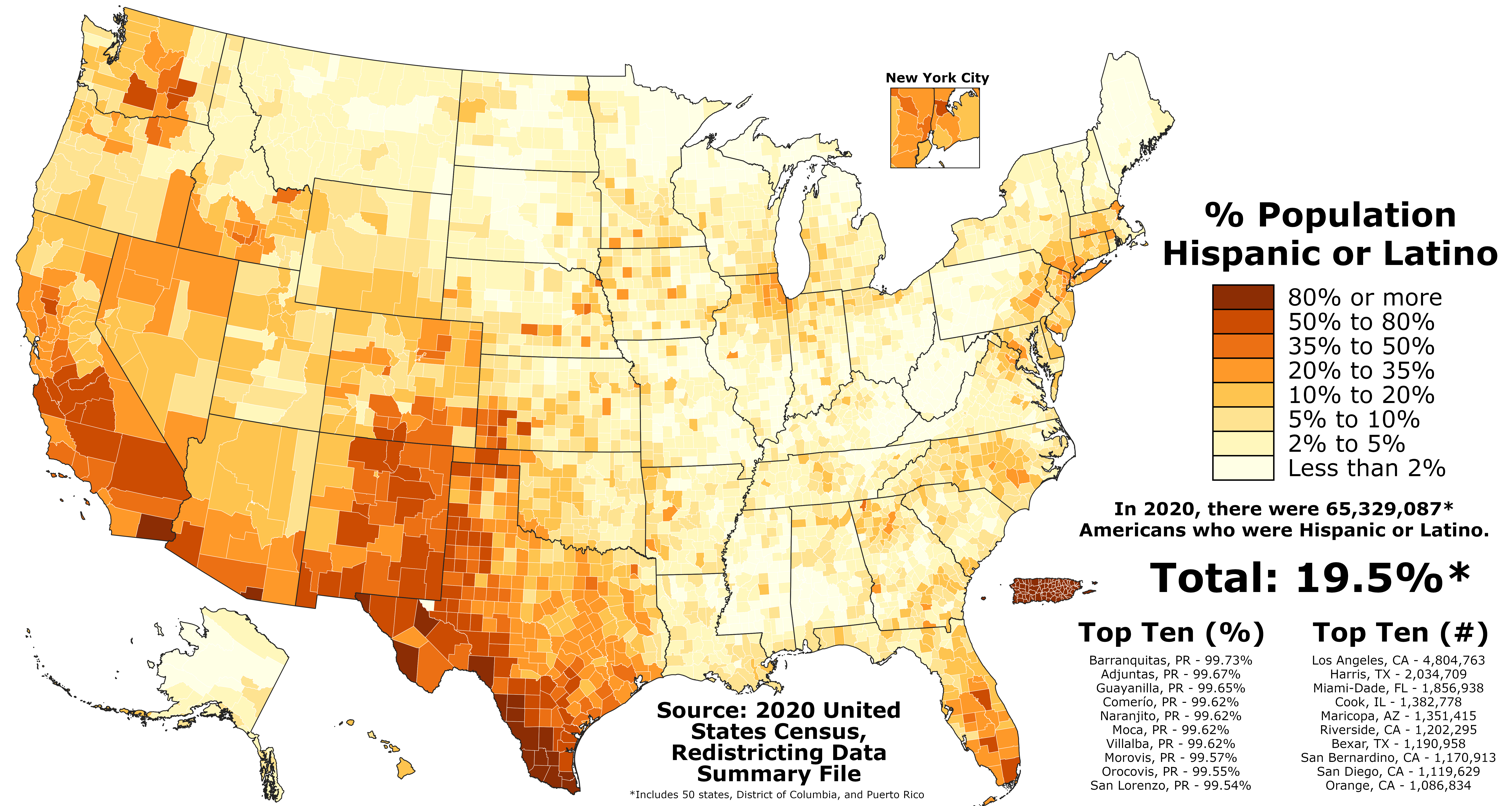
Proportion of Hispanic and Latino Americans in each county of the fifty states, the District of Columbia, and Puerto Rico as of the 2020 United States Census

The demographics of Hispanic and Latino Americans depict a population that is the second-largest ethnic group in the United States, 62 million people or 18.7% of the national population.

The Latino population is much younger than the rest of the country, of no less than two dozen national origins and of every race, with a longer life expectancy than their fellow Americans, and geographically concentrated in the southwestern United States.

== History ==
Hispanic and Latino Americans (along with Asian Americans, most notably) have contributed to an important demographic change in the United States since the 1960s whereby minority groups now compose one-third of the population. Nearly one in six Americans was Hispanic or Latino as of 2009, a total of 48.4 million out of the estimated 307 million Americans. High rates of immigration and fertility have shaped the growth of the Hispanic and Latino population.

== Population ==
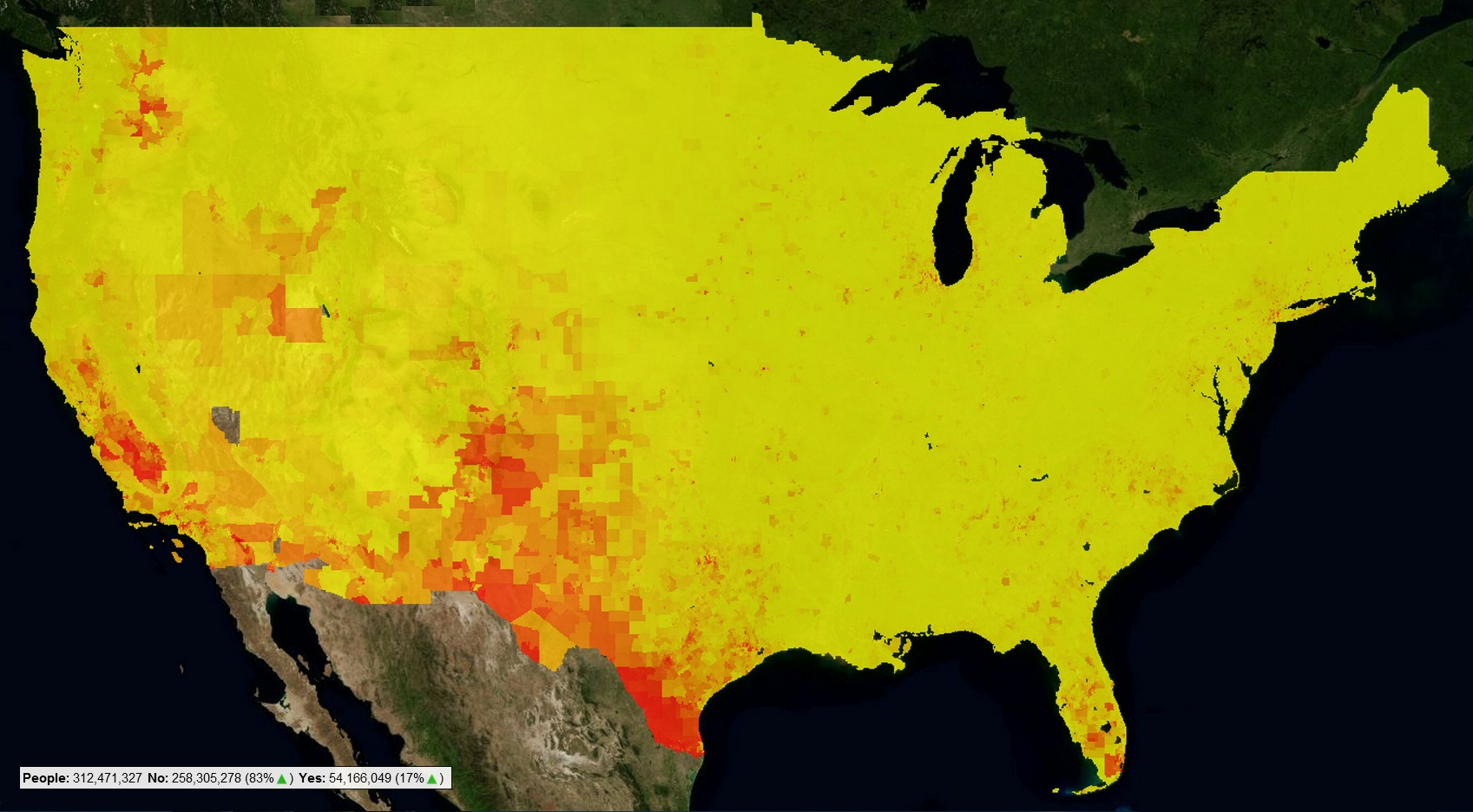
CensusViewer US 2010 Census Latino Population as a heatmap by census tract

== Hispanic and Latino Population by state or territory (2000–2010) ==
In 2011, Hispanics accounted for 16.7% of the national population, or around 52 million people. The Hispanic growth rate over the April 1, 2000 to July 1, 2007 period was 28.7%—about four times the rate of the nation's total population (at 7.2%). The growth rate from July 1, 2005 to July 1, 2006 alone was 3.4%—about three and a half times the rate of the nation's total population (at 1.0%). Based on the 2010 census, Hispanics are now the largest minority group in 191 out of 366 metropolitan areas in the US. The projected Hispanic population of the United States for July 1, 2050 is 132.8 million people, or 30.2% of the nation's total projected population on that date.

=== Geographic distribution ===
As of 2000, the ten most populous places with Hispanic majorities were

- East Los Angeles (97% Hispanic),
- Laredo, Texas (94%),
- Brownsville, Texas (91%)
- Hialeah, Florida (90%),
- McAllen, Texas (80%),
- El Paso, Texas (77%),
- Santa Ana, California (76%),
- El Monte, California (72%)
- Oxnard, California (66%),
- Miami, Florida (66%).

The Hispanic population of Los Angeles County, California, numbering 4.7 million, is the largest of all counties in the nation, comprising 47 percent of the county's ten million residents.

Hispanic and Latino Population by state or territory (2000–2010)

State/Territory	Pop 2000	% pop 2000	Pop 2010	% pop 2010	% growth 2000-2010	%pop 2012
Alabama	75,830	1.7%	185,602	3.9%	+144.8%	4.1%
Alaska	25,852	4.1%	39,250	5.5%	+51.8%	6.1%
Arizona	1,295,617	25.3%	1,895,149	29.6%	+46.3%	30.2%
Arkansas	86,866	3.2%	186,050	6.4%	+114.2%	6.8%
California	10,966,556	32.4%	14,013,719	37.6%	+27.8%	38.2%
Colorado	735,801	17.1%	1,038,687	20.7%	+41.2%	21.0%
Connecticut	320,323	9.4%	479,087	13.4%	+49.6%	14.2%
Delaware	37,277	4.8%	73,221	8.2%	+96.4%	8.6%
(Washington, D.C.) District of Columbia	44,953	7.9%	54,749	9.1%	+21.8%	9.9%
Florida	2,682,715	16.8%	4,223,806	22.5%	+57.4%	23.2%
(Georgia (U.S. state)) Georgia	435,227	5.3%	853,689	8.8%	+96.1%	9.2%
Hawaii	87,699	7.2%	120,842	8.9%	+37.8%	9.5%
Idaho	101,690	7.9%	175,901	11.2%	+73.0%	11.6%
Illinois	1,530,262	12.3%	2,027,578	15.8%	+32.5%	16.3%
Indiana	214,536	3.5%	389,707	6.0%	+81.7%	6.3%
Iowa	82,473	2.8%	151,544	5.0%	+83.7%	5.3%
Kansas	188,252	7.0%	300,042	10.5%	+59.4%	11.0%
Kentucky	59,939	1.5%	132,836	3.1%	+121.6%	3.2%
Louisiana	107,738	2.4%	192,560	4.2%	+78.7%	4.5%
Maine	9,360	0.7%	16,935	1.3%	+80.9%	1.4%
Maryland	227,916	4.3%	470,632	8.2%	+106.5%	8.7%
Massachusetts	428,729	6.8%	627,654	9.6%	+46.4%	10.1%
Michigan	323,877	3.3%	436,358	4.4%	+34.7%	4.6%
Minnesota	143,382	2.9%	250,258	4.7%	+74.5%	4.9%
Mississippi	39,569	1.4%	81,481	2.7%	+105.9%	2.9%
Missouri	118,592	2.1%	212,470	3.5%	+79.2%	3.7%
Montana	18,081	2.0%	28,565	2.9%	+58.0%	3.1%
Nebraska	94,425	5.5%	167,405	9.2%	+77.3%	9.7%
Nevada	393,970	19.7%	716,501	26.5%	+81.9%	27.3%
New Hampshire	20,489	1.7%	36,704	2.8%	+79.1%	3.0%
New Jersey	1,117,191	13.3%	1,555,144	17.7%	+39.2%	18.5%
New Mexico	765,386	42.1%	953,403	46.3%	+24.6%	47.0%
(New York (state)) New York	2,867,583	15.1%	3,416,922	17.6%	+19.2%	18.2%
North Carolina	378,963	4.7%	800,120	8.4%	+111.1%	8.7%
North Dakota	7,786	1.2%	13,467	2.0%	+73.0%	2.5%
Ohio	217,123	1.9%	354,674	3.1%	+63.4%	3.3%
Oklahoma	179,304	5.2%	332,007	8.9%	+85.2%	9.3%
Oregon	275,314	8.0%	450,062	11.7%	+63.5%	12.2%
Pennsylvania	394,088	3.2%	719,660	5.7%	+82.6%	6.1%
Rhode Island	90,820	8.7%	130,655	12.4%	+43.9%	13.2%
South Carolina	95,076	2.4%	235,682	5.1%	+147.9%	5.3%
South Dakota	10,903	1.4%	22,119	2.7%	+102.9%	3.1%
Tennessee	123,838	2.2%	290,059	4.6%	+134.2%	4.8%
Texas	6,669,666	32.0%	9,460,921	37.6%	+41.8%	38.2%
Utah	201,559	9.0%	358,340	13.0%	+77.8%	13.3%
Vermont	5,504	0.9%	9,208	1.5%	+67.3%	1.6%
Virginia	329,540	4.7%	631,825	7.9%	+91.7%	8.4%
(Washington (state)) Washington	441,509	7.5%	755,790	11.2%	+71.2%	11.7%
West Virginia	12,279	0.7%	22,268	1.2%	+81.4%	1.3%
Wisconsin	192,921	3.6%	336,056	5.9%	+74.2%	6.2%
Wyoming	31,669	6.4%	50,231	8.9%	+58.6%	9.5%
American Samoa			109	0.2%		
Guam			2,124	1.4%		
Northern Mariana Islands			117	0.2%		
Puerto Rico	3,762,746	98.8%	3,688,455	99.0%	0.2%	99.5%
(United States Virgin Islands) U.S. Virgin Islands	15,196	14.0%	18,514	17.4%		
United States of America	35,305,818	12.5%	50,497,108	16.3%	+43.0%	16.9%

=== Hispanic and Latino populations of each state by region of origin ===
The population change of Hispanic or Latino residents by county (2010 Census data)

Over 60% of the Hispanic and Latino population in the United States is of Mexican ancestry. The influence of Mexican and Mexican-American culture is felt throughout the country, with the epicenter of this influence located in the southwestern United States, including Texas, Nevada, Arizona and Southern California.

The remaining 40% of Latinos in the United States hail from the Caribbean, Central America and South America. Caribbean Latinos are those with ancestry originating in the Caribbean islands of Puerto Rico, Cuba, and the Dominican Republic. Puerto Ricans are the second-largest Hispanic group in the U.S. after those of Mexican descent. There are large Puerto Rican and Dominican populations in the Northeastern states, including the urban centers of New York, New Jersey and Boston as well as large Cuban and Puerto Rican populations in Florida, including the influential Cuban-American enclave in Miami and a Puerto Rican community in Orlando that is the third largest in the world.

Central American Latinos come from El Salvador, Guatemala, Honduras, Nicaragua, Panama, Belize and Costa Rica. The largest numbers of Hispanics with Central American origins can be found in California, Texas, and the DC Metropolitan area. Due to its large agricultural industry, Florida has been a frequent destination for Guatemalan and Honduran migrant workers who often live and work alongside the state's large population of Mexicans.

Latinos from South America come from Colombia, Venezuela, Peru, Ecuador, Chile, Bolivia and Paraguay. Significant numbers of Colombians and people of Colombian ancestry live in Miami and throughout Florida, as do Peruvians, who also have enclaves in New Jersey and the DC Metropolitical Area. Other Hispanic and Latino groups come from Spain, and the descendants of the colonial Spanish in Florida, Louisiana, and the US southwest.

Hispanic and Latino populations of each state by region of origin (2010 Census)
State/Territory	Mexican	% Mexican	Caribbean	% Caribbean	Central American	% Central American	South American	% South American	other Hispanic	% other
Alabama	122,911	2.6%	17,141	0.4%	22,800	0.5%	5,938	0.1%	16,812	0.4%
Alaska	21,642	3.0%	7,338	1.0%	2,509	0.4%	2,345	0.3%	5,415	0.8%
Arizona	1,657,668	25.9%	48,582	0.8%	36,642	0.6%	21,895	0.3%	130,362	2.0%
Arkansas	138,194	4.7%	6,666	0.3%	23,216	0.8%	3,028	0.1%	14,946	0.5%
California	11,423,146	30.7%	290,007	0.8%	1,132,520	3.0%	293,880	0.8%	874,166	2.3%
Colorado	757,181	15.1%	30,992	0.6%	29,386	0.6%	19,117	0.4%	202,011	4.0%
Connecticut	50,658	1.4%	288,555	8.2%	35,023	1.0%	71,355	2.0%	33,496	0.9%
Delaware	30,283	3.4%	26,011	3.0%	8,112	0.9%	3,849	0.4%	4,966	0.6%
(Washington, D.C.) District of Columbia	8,507	1.4%	7,426	1.3%	23,354	3.9%	7,639	1.3%	7,823	1.3%
Florida	629,718	3.3%	2,233,439	12.0%	432,665	2.3%	674,542	3.6%	253,442	1.3%
(Georgia (U.S. state)) Georgia	519,502	5.4%	111,976	1.3%	106,987	1.1%	57,707	0.6%	57,517	0.6%
Hawaii	35,415	2.6%	46,260	3.4%	2,962	0.2%	3,549	0.3%	32,656	2.4%
Idaho	148,923	9.5%	3,920	0.3%	3,494	0.2%	3,707	0.2%	15,857	1.0%
Illinois	1,602,403	12.5%	211,221	1.7%	70,000	0.5%	67,862	0.5%	76,092	0.6%
Indiana	295,373	4.6%	36,686	0.7%	22,093	0.3%	10,032	0.2%	25,523	0.4%
Iowa	117,090	3.8%	6,540	0.3%	13,289	0.4%	3,754	0.1%	10,871	0.4%
Kansas	247,297	8.7%	12,734	0.5%	15,293	0.5%	5,845	0.2%	18,873	0.7%
Kentucky	82,110	1.9%	21,842	0.6%	11,479	0.3%	5,405	0.1%	12,000	0.3%
Louisiana	78,643	1.7%	25,171	0.6%	51,722	1.1%	8,871	0.2%	28,153	0.6%
Maine	5,134	0.4%	5,770	0.5%	1,708	0.1%	1,515	0.1%	2,808	0.2%
Maryland	88,004	1.5%	67,811	1.2%	195,692	3.4%	61,400	1.1%	57,725	1.0%
Massachusetts	38,379	0.6%	380,723	6.0%	96,958	1.5%	54,398	0.8%	57,196	0.9%
Michigan	317,903	3.2%	52,201	0.6%	17,785	0.2%	13,243	0.1%	35,226	0.4%
Minnesota	176,007	3.3%	15,762	0.3%	19,908	0.4%	18,075	0.3%	20,506	0.4%
Mississippi	52,459	1.8%	8,684	0.3%	8,343	0.3%	2,833	0.1%	9,162	0.3%
Missouri	147,254	2.5%	18,718	0.3%	17,763	0.3%	8,731	0.1%	20,004	0.3%
Montana	20,048	2.0%	2,007	0.2%	735	0.1%	997	0.1%	4,778	0.5%
Nebraska	128,060	7.0%	5,752	0.3%	17,242	0.9%	2,824	0.2%	13,527	0.7%
Nevada	540,978	20.0%	44,569	1.7%	55,937	2.1%	19,056	0.7%	55,961	2.1%
New Hampshire	7,822	0.6%	17,538	1.4%	2,731	0.2%	4,266	0.3%	4,347	0.3%
New Jersey	217,715	2.5%	715,376	8.1%	176,611	2.0%	325,179	3.7%	120,263	1.4%
New Mexico	590,890	28.7%	12,754	0.6%	6,621	0.3%	4,841	0.2%	338,297	16.4%
(New York (state)) New York	457,288	2.4%	1,816,148	9.5%	353,589	1.8%	513,417	2.6%	276,480	1.4%
North Carolina	486,960	5.1%	105,104	1.2%	105,066	1.1%	46,307	0.5%	56,683	0.6%
North Dakota	9,223	1.4%	1,337	0.3%	452	0.1%	539	0.1%	1,916	0.3%
Ohio	172,029	1.5%	108,941	1.0%	22,756	0.2%	17,571	0.2%	33,377	0.3%
Oklahoma	267,016	7.1%	15,705	0.4%	15,641	0.4%	7,134	0.2%	26,511	0.7%
Oregon	369,817	9.7%	14,342	0.4%	18,190	0.5%	9,648	0.3%	38,065	1.0%
Pennsylvania	129,568	1.0%	466,360	3.6%	35,453	0.3%	48,126	0.6%	60,153	0.5%
Rhode Island	9,090	0.9%	71,627	6.8%	23,817	2.3%	14,013	1.3%	12,108	1.2%
South Carolina	138,358	3.0%	35,466	0.8%	26,290	0.6%	17,856	0.4%	17,712	0.4%
South Dakota	13,839	1.7%	1,827	0.2%	2,891	0.4%	617	0.1%	2,945	0.4%
Tennessee	186,615	2.9%	30,946	0.5%	36,856	0.6%	11,039	0.2%	24,603	0.4%
Texas	7,951,193	31.6%	190,470	0.8%	420,683	1.7%	133,808	0.5%	764,767	3.0%
Utah	258,905	9.4%	10,397	0.4%	20,442	0.7%	26,028	0.9%	42,568	1.5%
Vermont	2,534	0.4%	3,053	0.5%	671	0.1%	1,204	0.2%	1,746	0.3%
Virginia	155,067	1.9%	99,691	1.3%	206,568	2.6%	101,480	1.3%	69,019	0.9%
(Washington (state)) Washington	601,768	8.9%	34,401	0.5%	33,661	0.5%	20,742	0.3%	65,218	1.0%
West Virginia	9,704	0.5%	4,828	0.3%	2,081	0.1%	1,700	0.1%	3,955	0.2%
Wisconsin	244,248	4.3%	51,805	0.9%	10,616	0.2%	9,675	0.2%	19,712	0.3%
Wyoming	37,719	6.7%	1,346	0.3%	977	0.2%	852	0.2%	9,337	1.7%
United States of America	31,798,258	10.3%	7,823,966	2.6%	3,998,280	1.3%	2,769,434	0.9%	4,087,656	1.3%

=== Race ===
The majority of Hispanic Americans identify as "some other race" at over 42%. Of all Americans who checked the box "Some Other Race" in the 2020 Census, 94% percent were Hispanic. The number of Hispanic Americans who identify as "Some Other Race" increased 41.7% from 2010 to 2020. The 2030 census will include new options for identifying race and ethnicity, including a "Hispanic or Latino" box to reduce the number of people who choose the “some other race” category. The next largest racial identification among Hispanic Americans is “two or more races” at 32%. Over half of the “two or more races” respondents in the 2020 census were Hispanics. The largest number of White Hispanics come from within the Mexican community, the highest percentage of White Hispanics among major Hispanic groups comes from the Cuban American community, also high percentages of White Hispanics from Hispanic groups come from within the Colombian and also Spanish communities. The largest number of Black Hispanics come from within the Puerto Rican community, while the highest percentage of Black Hispanics among major Hispanic groups come from the Dominican community. Significant numbers of Black Hispanics can also be found among the Central American communities.

The largest number of Asian Hispanics come from within the Mexican community, while the highest percentage of Asian Hispanics come from the Peruvian community. The largest population of Native American Hispanic come from within the Mexican community and the highest percentage of Native American Hispanics among major Hispanic groups come from within the Guatemalan community.

Though comprising very small percentages of the Hispanic and Latino American population, and even smaller percentages of the total U.S. population, some of the preceding racial subgroups make up large minorities among the respective racial groups, overall. For instance, Hispanics and Latinos who are American Indian or Alaska Native compose 15% of all American Indians and Alaska Natives (per the ACS estimates). Meanwhile, the 120,000 Hispanics and Latinos who are of Native Hawaiian and Other Pacific Islander race compose 22% of this entire race nationally (per the Population Estimates). Again, nearly a third of the overall 'Two or more race' population is Hispanic or Latino (ACS).

Racial Demographics of Hispanic Americans Between 1970 and 2020
Race/Ethnic Group	1970	1980	1990	2000	2010	2020
Total Population	9,072,602	14,608,673	22,354,059	35,305,818	50,477,594	62,080,044
White alone	8,466,126 (93.3%)	8,115,256 (55.6%)	11,557,774 (51.7%)	16,907,852 (47.9%)	26,735,713 (53.0%)	12,579,626 (20.3%)
Black alone	454,934 (5.0%)	390,852 (2.7%)	769,767 (3.4%)	710,353 (2.0%)	1,243,471 (2.5%)	1,163,862 (1.9%)
Native American or Alaska Native alone	26,859 (0.3%)	94,745 (0.6%)	165,461 (0.7%)	407,073 (1.2%)	685,150 (1.4%)	1,475,436 (2.4%)
Asian or Pacific Islander alone	-	166,010 (1.1%)	305,303 (1.4%)	165,155 (0.5%)	267,565 (0.5%)	335,278 (0.5%)
Some other race alone	124,683 (1.4%) (Note: Includes Asian Americans.)	5,841,810 (40.0%)	9,555,754 (42.7%)	14,891,303 (42.2%)	18,503,103 (36.7%)	26,225,882 (42.2%)
Two or more races	– (Note: The 1970 US census did not allow for the selection of multiple races.)	– (Note: The 1980 US census did not allow for the selection of multiple races.)	– (Note: The 1990 US census did not allow for the selection of multiple races.)	2,224,082 (6.3%)	3,042,592 (6.0%)	20,299,960 (32.7%)

Race of Major Hispanic ancestries (2010 US Census)(self-identified race)"Race of Major Hispanic Groups: 2010" (PDF). Pew Hispanic Center.
Hispanic ancestry	Total	White	Black	American Indian and Alaska Native	Asian	Other (Some Other Race or Two or More Races or Native Hawaiian or Other Pacific Islander)
(Mexico) Mexican	31,798,258 100%	16,794,111 52.8%	296,778 0.9%	460,098 1.4%	101,654 0.3%	14,145,617 44.6%
(Puerto Rico) Puerto Rican	4,623,716 100%	2,455,534 53.1%	403,372 8.7%	42,504 0.9%	24,312 0.5%	1,697,994 36.7%
(Cuba) Cuban	1,785,547 100%	1,525,521 85.4%	82,398 4.6%	3,002 0.2%	4,391 0.2%	170,235 9.6%
(El Salvador) Salvadoran	1,648,968 100%	663,224 40.2%	16,150 1.0%	17,682 1.1%	4,737 0.3%	947,175 57.4%
(Dominican Republic) Dominican	1,414,703 100%	419,016 29.6%	182,005 12.9%	19,183 1.4%	4,056 0.3%	790,443 55.8%
(Guatemala) Guatemalan	1,044,209 100%	401,763 38.5%	11,471 1.1%	31,197 3.0%	2,386 0.2%	597,392 57.2%
All other	4,087,656 100%	2,018,397 49.4%	112,521 2.8%	75,976 1.9%	50,299 1.2%	1,830,463 44.9%
Total	50,477,594 100%	26,735,713 53.0%	1,243,471 2.5%	685,150 1.4%	209,128 0.4%	21,604,132 42.8%

=== Sexuality ===
According to a Gallup survey conducted from June to September 2012, it found that 4 percent of Hispanic and Latino Americans self identify as LGBT; this is greater than the estimated 3.4 percent of American adults that self identify as LGBT in the total population, but the difference is well within the margin of error for the number of LGBT Latinos in the 121 000 sample population of the survey.

== Socioeconomic status ==
=== Education ===
According to the U.S Census Bureau, Hispanics are among the least educated ethnic group. In 2000, about 530,000 Hispanics and Latinos 16–19 years of age were high school dropouts, yielding a dropout rate of 21.1 percent for all Hispanics and Latinos.

11 percent of Hispanics/Latinos have earned a bachelor's degree or higher, compared with 17 percent of non-Hispanic blacks, 30 percent of non-Hispanic whites, and 49 percent of Asian Americans. Often, Hispanic and Latino youth begin schooling without the necessary economic and social resources that other children have. One frequent cause is their being the children of immigrant parents with low socioeconomic status and language barriers that result in a lack of knowledge about the U.S. education system. These unfavorable conditions frequently spawn others, such as weak parent-teacher relationships.

The overall average years of schooling for Hispanics and Latinos (10.5) does not include high school graduation (12 years). There is a notable education gap between foreign-born Hispanics, who have more difficulties with language barriers, and U.S.-born Hispanics. The latter only lag non-Hispanic Whites by 1.3 years of schooling, and nearly tie African Americans, as seen in the table below.

Hispanics can also attend Hispanic-serving institutions (HSIs), which are colleges or universities in the United States that attempt to assist first generation, majority low income Hispanic students. There are over 250 schools that have been designated as an HSI.

Table 1

Average Years of Schooling, by Gender, Ethnicity, and Nativity Men, by Nativity Women, by Nativity

Ethnicity All Foreign-Born US Born All Foreign-Born US Born Whites 13.6 13.6 Black 12.4 12.8 All Hispanics 10.5 9.5 12.2 10.8 9.8 12.4 Mexicans 9.8 8.5 12.1 10.1 8.6 12.2 Puerto Ricans 11.7 11.2 12.4 12.0 11.4 12.7 Cubans 12.7 12.4 13.6 12.9 12.5 14.2

(NOTE: The samples include individuals ages 25 to 59.)

=== Employment ===
Employment and earnings are a measure of labor market success, and depend on educational attainment. Given the lower level of education of the Hispanic or Latino population and the growing need for a college degree for entry-level jobs, Hispanics and Latinos are behind when entering into the labor force. The annual employment rate is defined as the percentage of individuals who worked any period of time during the calendar year. Although Hispanics do not lag behind non-Hispanic blacks when it comes to employment rates, they do lag non-Hispanic whites. There is a major gap between male and female rates in Hispanics due to high fertility rates and female absence from the labor force to give birth. Furthermore, nativity plays a major role in employment rates because U.S. born Hispanics are more accustomed to the U.S. labor market.

Table2

Annual Employment Rates (Percentages), by Gender, Ethnicity and Nativity

Men, by Nativity Women, by Nativity

Ethnicity All Foreign-Born US Born All Foreign-Born US Born Whites 91.8 80.2 Blacks 77.4 77.7 Hispanics 86.8 87.5 85.6 67.0 61.2 76.3 Mexicans 87.8 88.5 86.5 64.7 56.1 76.4 Puerto Ricans 80.0 76.6 83.8 67.7 60.8 75.5 Cubans 87.3 86.8 89.1 74.7 72.5 82.5 |} (NOTE: The samples include individuals ages 25 to 59.)

=== Earnings ===
In 2006, adults 18 and older with a master's, professional, or doctoral degree earned an average of $79,946, while those with less than a high school diploma earned about $19,915.

Hispanic and Latino median earnings are significantly lower than the median earnings of the total U.S. population, a result of the lower education levels of the former group. Yet, there are other causes of the earnings gap besides education. A report released by the Census Bureau in 2003 estimated that the average lifetime earnings of Hispanics with an advanced degree are $500,000 less than those of non-Hispanic whites with an equivalent education.

=== Homeownership ===
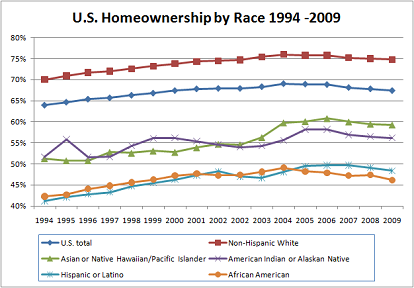
The US homeownership rate according to race

Hispanic homeownership in 2016 was 45.6%. Around half of Hispanic-Americans live in their own house.

=== Poverty ===
Estimates show that about 22 percent of the Hispanic and Latino population is below the poverty level, with the rate being higher for children, while 8.3 percent of non-Hispanic whites and about 25 percent of African American remain under the poverty level as well.

== See also ==
- List of California communities with Hispanic- or Latino-majority populations in the 2010 census
- Demographics of the United States
- List of Mexican American communities
- List of Stateside Puerto Rican communities
