= Avakaya =

Mango pickle from Andhra Pradesh, India

- Alternative names: ఊరగాయ
- Region or state: South India
- Main ingredients: mustard powder, red chili powder, salt, sesame oil

Avakaya (Telugu: ఆవకాయ) is a traditional pickle originating from the Indian state of Andhra Pradesh. It is a type of mango pickle made from raw green mangoes, a generous amount of mustard powder, red chili powder, salt, and sesame oil. Considered an iconic dish and a staple of Telugu cuisine, it is a fixture in virtually every Telugu household and a profound cultural signature of the region. It is known for its intense spicy, sour, and pungent flavour.

== Etymology ==
The name Avakaya is derived from two Telugu words: Aava (ఆవ), meaning mustard, and Kaya (కాయ), meaning raw fruit or, specifically, raw mango.

== History and origin ==
Avakaya has a long history in the culinary traditions of Andhra Pradesh. The pickle evolved as a method of preservation, allowing the sour mangoes to be stored and consumed year round. The recipe and techniques are traditionally passed down through generations within families.

== Ingredients and preparation ==
The primary ingredients are raw green mangoes, powdered mustard seeds, red chili powder, salt, fenugreek powder, and sesame oil (nuvvula noone). Optional additions include garlic, asafoetida and turmeric. Avakaya pickles are usually made in the summer, this being the time for peak availability of green mangoes. Green mangoes, hot oil, chilies and a variety of spices are the key ingredients. The process of preparation, storage and serving is considered almost a ritual.

The preparation is a often family or communal process:

1. Selection: Firm, sour, raw mangoes are selected and washed.
2. Cutting: They are cut into medium sized pieces using strong and especially sharp cutters/knives in swift strokes so as not to structurally damage the pieces, often with the skin on.
3. Drying: The pieces are thoroughly dried in the shade or to eliminate all moisture.
4. Mixing: The mango pieces are mixed with mustard powder, chili powder, salt, and other spices to form a thick, dry coating.
5. Packing & Sealing: The mixture is tightly packed into a sterilised ceramic or glass jar. Heated and cooled sesame oil is poured over the top to form an airtight seal.
6. Curing: The jar is sealed and left in direct sunlight for several days to ferment. The pickle matures over several weeks, developing its full flavour.

== Varieties ==
- Vellulli Avakaya: Includes a significant amount of garlic.
- Endu Mamidi Avakaya: An extra spicy version from the Rayalaseema region.
- Royyala Avakaya: A coastal version that includes dried prawns.
- Dabbakaya: Made with a Indian citron.

== Cultural significance ==
Avakaya is more than a condiment, it is a cultural symbol of Telugu identity and hospitality. Its preparation marks the beginning of summer in many households. The preparation is an annual, often elaborate, family or communal event that lifts spirits and reinforces bonds. The activity is filled with shared stories, traditional music, and collective anticipation, marking the seasonal transition with energy and joy. The quality of a family's avakaya is often a point of pride and a measure of culinary skill. It is a customary gift item and a taste of home for the Telugu diaspora. A common cultural saying humorously suggests that with a plate of hot rice, ghee, and good avakaya, one can accomplish anything.

== Global export ==
Due to the significant Telugu diaspora and growing international demand for regional Indian specialties, Avakaya is now a globally exported product. It is commercially produced by several food brands in Andhra Pradesh and Telangana, who adhere to traditional recipes while meeting modern food safety and packaging standards for international markets.

== See also ==
- Indian pickle
- Andhra cuisine
- Mango pickle
