= Chhundo =

Kind of Indian pickle from Gujarat

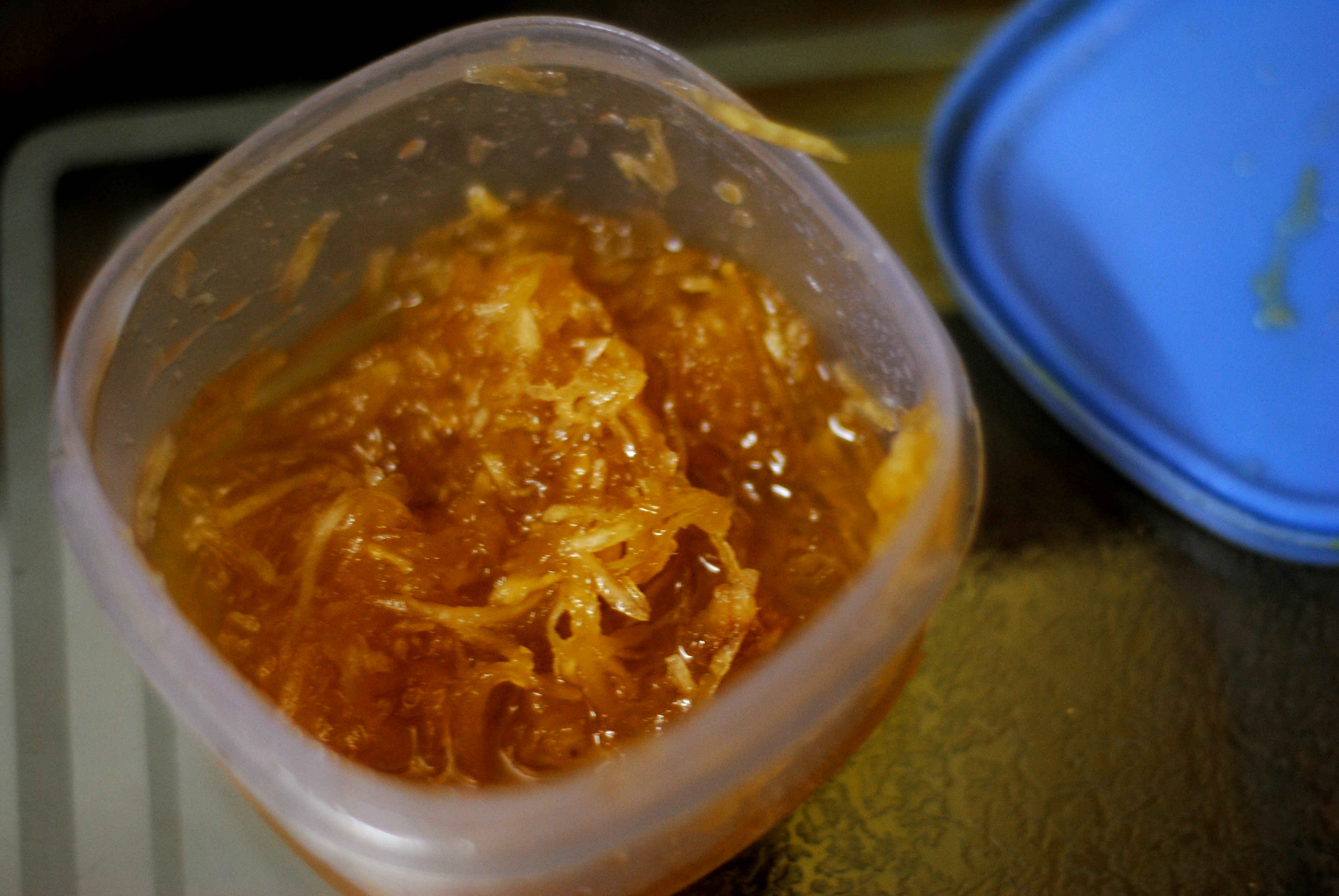
- Chhundo
- Alternative names: Chundo
- Course: Side dish
- Place of origin: India
- Region or state: Gujarat
- Serving temperature: At room temperature
- Main ingredients: Mango and sugar syrup
- Variations: Served spiced with red chilies

Chhundo (Gujarati: છૂંદો, Hindi: छुन्दो) is a kind of Indian pickle preparation as well as a condiment mostly made out of grated green mangoes, used in cuisine of the Indian subcontinent as an accompaniment to the main meal that consists of Roti, Sabzi and other food items. However, it is a generic form of preparation that can be made with various fruits and vegetables. Chhundo is particularly a Kathiawadi dish but is consumed across Gujarat.

Since mango is a seasonal fruit and is available in abundance only in summer in India (April–July), most mango pickles are made during this time with oil or sugar base and then preserved in large glass containers. This way Chhundo and other pickles are available for consumption throughout the year.

== Etymology ==
Chhundo, literally translated in Gujarati means crushed. Although sources of its origin are unknown, along with other popular Indian pickles, Chhundo and Murabbo, two types of mango relishes are commonly consumed in daily Gujarati meals.

== History ==
Chhundo is believed to have originated in the Kathiawar region of Gujarat.

== Preparation and variations ==
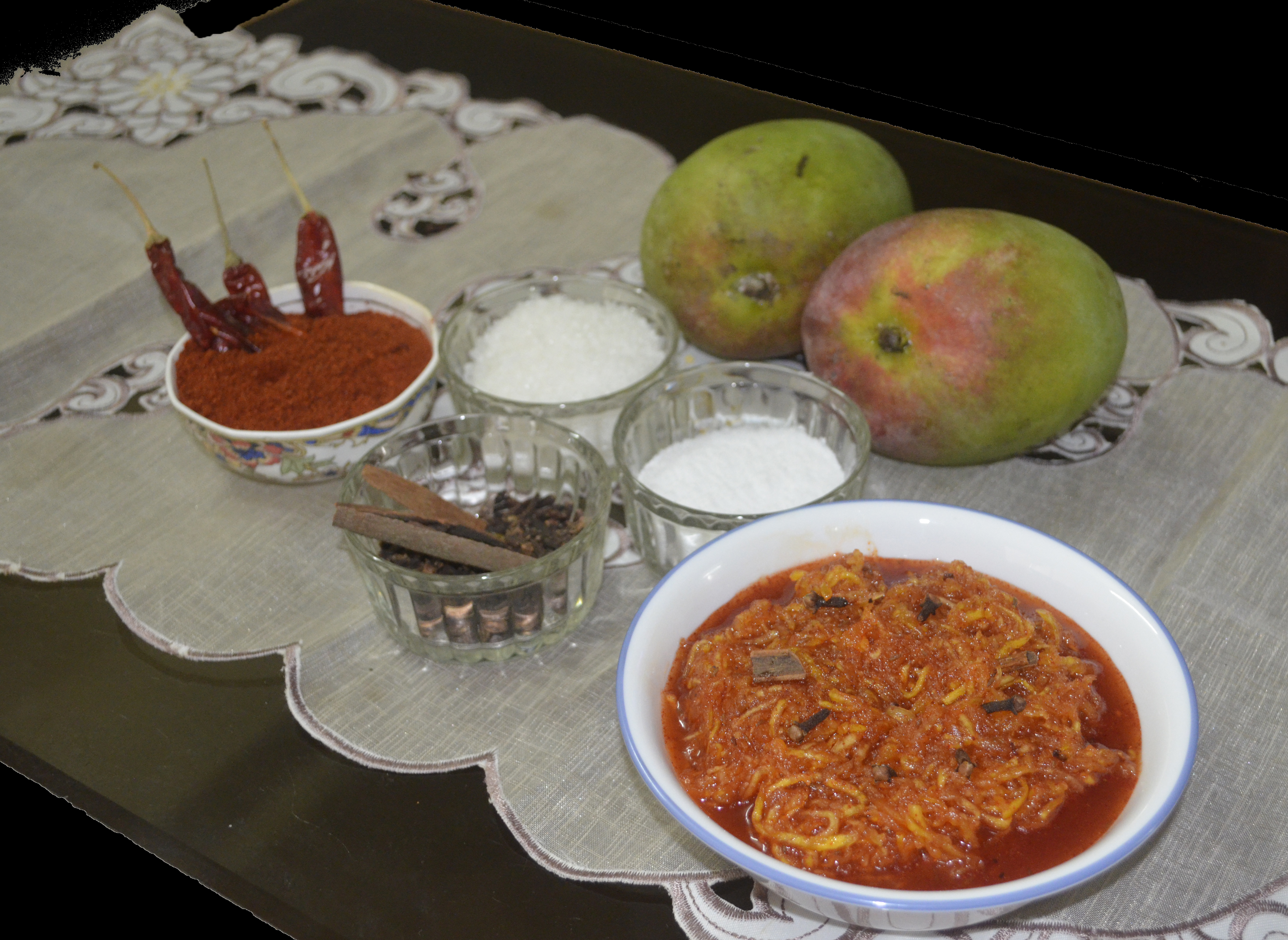
Chhundo with items used in its preparation

As mentioned earlier, although the most popular variety of Chhundo is the one prepared with grated mangoes, other variations such as pineapple Chhundo.

== Nutrition ==
A serving of 20 grams (0.71 oz) of Chhundo contains 61 calories, no fat or cholesterol, 124 milligrams (1.91 gr) of Sodium and 15 grams (0.53 oz) gms of carbohydrates. Since it is prepared and preserved in sugar syrup, its main energy component is sugar. It also provides Vitamin C and Vitamin A.

== See also ==
- South Asian pickles – Pickled varieties of vegetable and fruit
- List of condiments
- Mango pickle – Variety of pickles prepared using mango
