= Mango pickle =

Variety of pickles prepared using mango

A typical South Indian cut mango pickle

Mango pickle

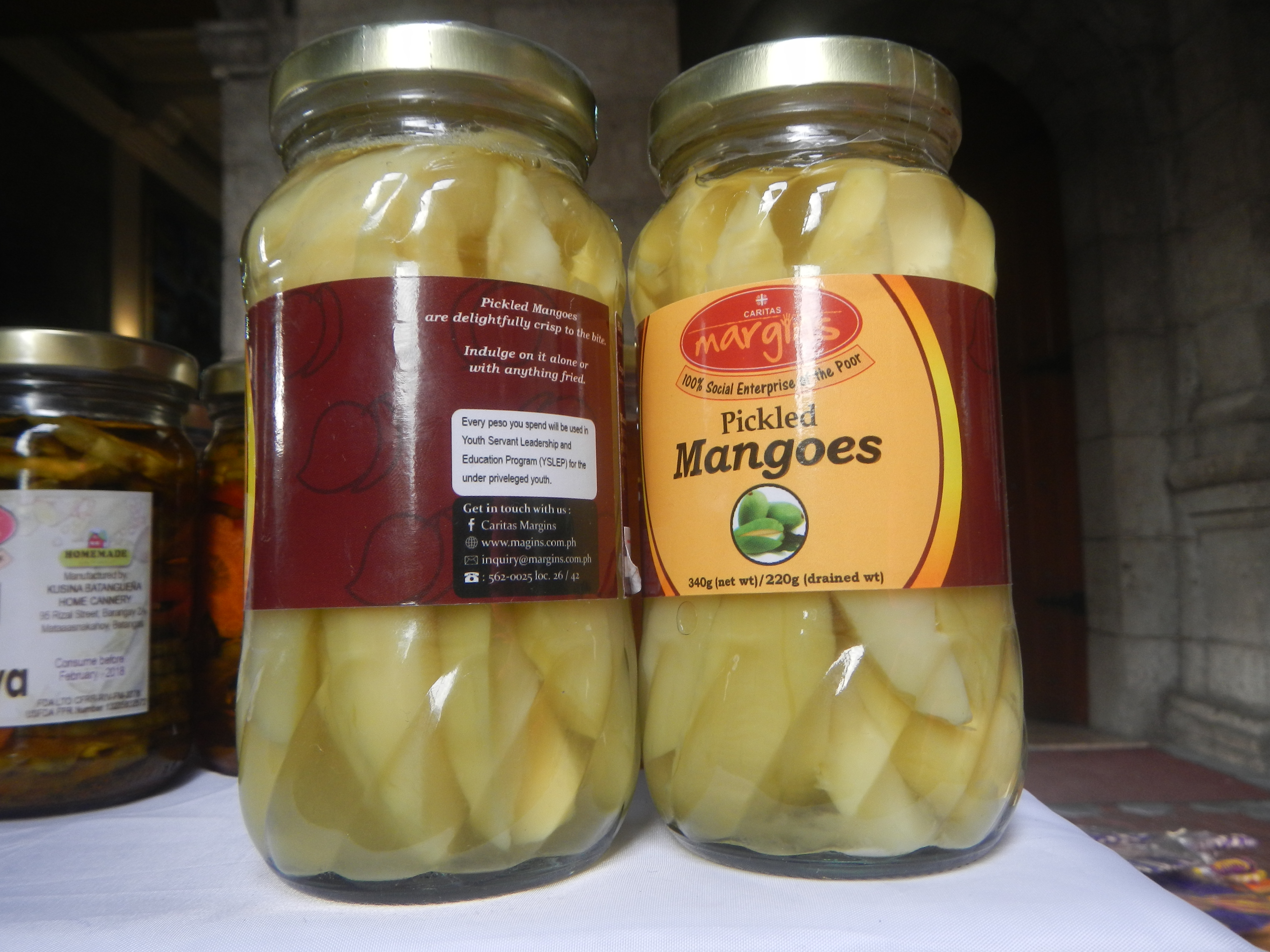
Commercial burong mangga in the Philippines

Mango pickle is a variety of pickle prepared using mango. It is very popular in South and Southeast Asia. These sour/spicy pickles are also available commercially.

== Overview ==
Many varieties of vegetables are used in the making of pickles. However, raw mango or tender mango is the most popular variety of fruit used for pickling in South Asia. The pickling process in India differs from other regions mainly due to an additional spice mixture added to them after anaerobic fermentation. There are multiple varieties of mango pickles prepared depending on the region and the spices used but broadly there are two types: whole baby mango pickles and cut mango pickle. Whole baby mango pickle is a traditional variety very popular in South India and uses baby mangoes that are few weeks old. There are special varieties of mangoes specifically used just for pickling and they are never consumed as ripe fruit. Baby mangoes are pickled using salt, vegetable oil and a blend of hot spices, in a very careful process which ensures pickles are preserved for years.

=== Cut mango pickle ===
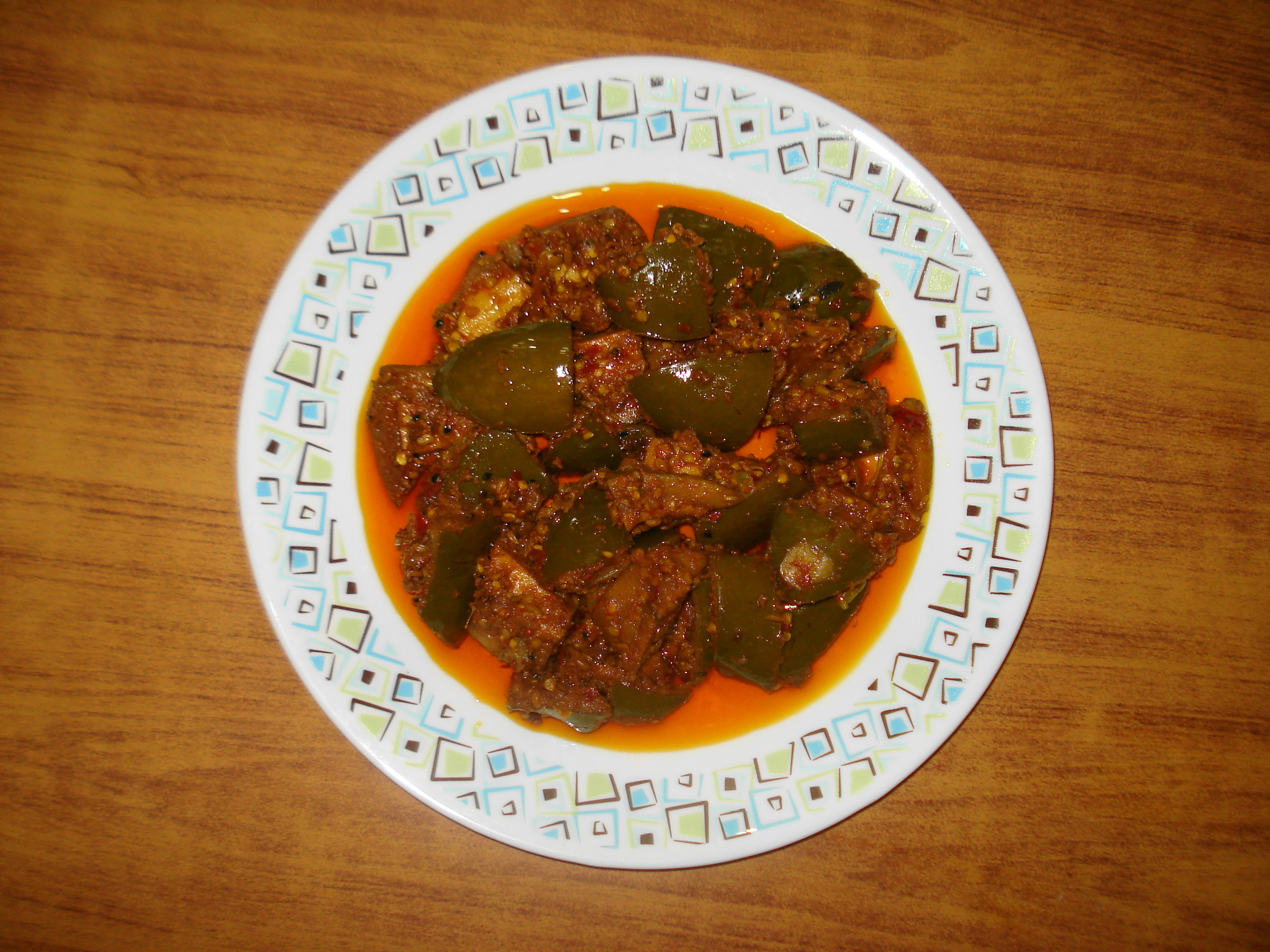
A plate of Pakistani mango pickle

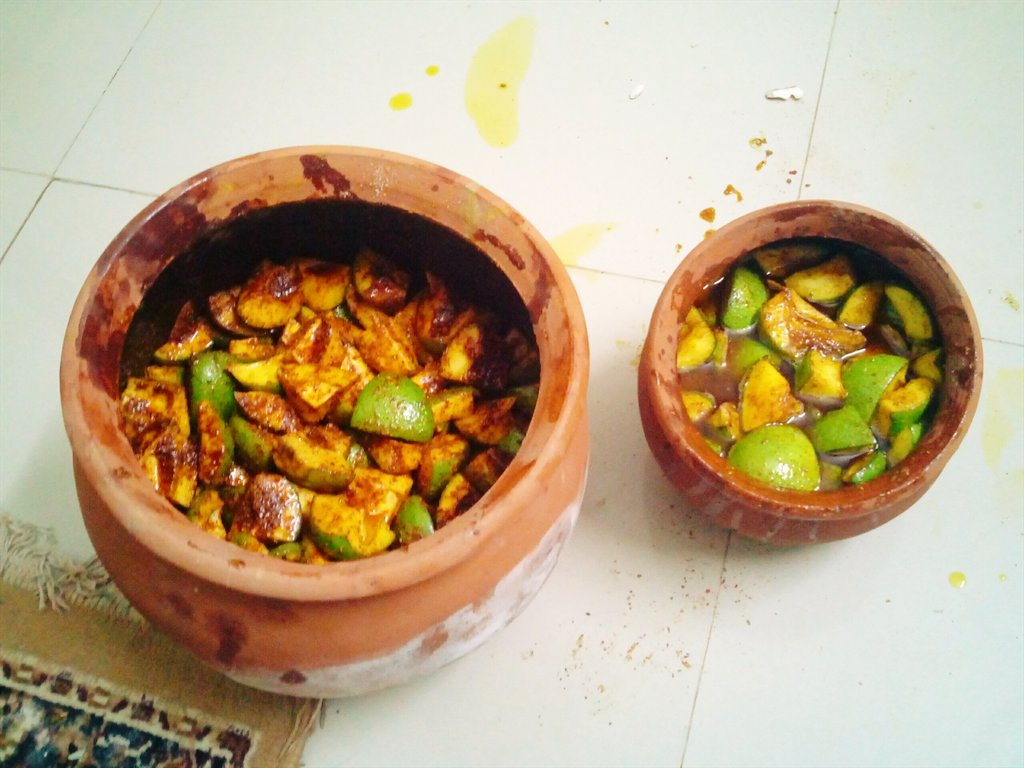
Homemade mango pickle

This is ideally prepared using a special variety of mango that can stay crisp for longer periods when pickled. This variety of mango is specially bred and grafted for use. However, most raw mango varieties can be pickled if quality is not a concern.

== Varieties ==
=== Amba ===
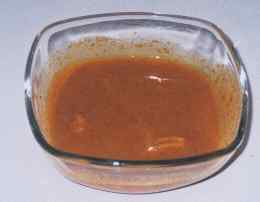
A bowl of amba

A tangy condiment made with mango pickle, amba or anba (Arabic: عنبة (Note: but also misspelled عمبة, أمبة, همبة), Hebrew: עמבה (Note: note the name of a type of preserve, Classical Syriac: ܐܡܒܓܐ, romanized: ambāḡa, loaned from Middle Persian)) was popularised by Iraqi Jewish merchants in Bombay who brought it back to Baghdad upon their return. Amba bears a resemblance to chutneys from South Asia. The spicy, sweet and sour sauce is typically made of pickled green mangoes, vinegar, salt, turmeric, chilies, and fenugreek. It is enjoyed in various Middle Eastern countries, as well as in Europe and the United States.

=== Avakaya ===
One of the most popular kind of mango pickles is called the "avakaya" (ఆవకాయ). A variety of Indian pickle popular in South India, it is also known as "uragaya" (ఊరగాయ) and mango pickle. Its origins can be traced to the Delta Districts of Andhra Pradesh. Known for its spice and flavor, it is usually eaten with plain white rice or on the side with other flavored rice items like a hot sauce and is a staple of meals in southern India, especially in the state of Andhra Pradesh.

The main ingredients are mangoes, āvapiṇḍi (ఆవపిండి; powdered mustard seeds) and a combination of other spices used for pickling. South Indians are known to have a deep attachment to these spicy pickles. A wide variety of pickles are available in these regions, using mango as their prime ingredient. Besides being made at home, the pickles are available commercially and are exported to the United States, Europe, Japan and many other countries.

Avakaya pickles are usually made in the summer, this being the time for peak availability of green mangoes. Green mangoes, hot oil, chilies and a variety of spices are the key ingredients. The process of preparation, storage and serving is considered almost a ritual.

The mangoes are cut into medium-sized pieces approximately 2 cm x 2 cm using strong and especially sharp cutters/knives in swift strokes so as not to structurally damage the pieces. These pieces are wiped clean and dry with a highly-absorbent soft cloth — usually an old sterilized cotton sari with no embroidery, stowed away for this purpose. They are then pickled with powdered mustard, red chili powder (dried and powdered or sometimes dried, roasted and powdered), salt, gingelly oil. The mixture matures for four to eight weeks, care being taken to mix the contents periodically to ensure a uniform marinade.

Hot rice is mixed with one or two pieces of avakaya and ghee (clarified butter) or groundnut oil, then made into bite-size balls. Avakaya is often eaten with rice and dahi (yogurt). Raw onion can be added which enhances the taste. Most people prefer to eat it along with muddapappu (pigeon pea dal) and neyyi (ghee/clarified butter). Some people prefer to eat it within 1–2 months from preparation, when it is called Kottāvakāya.

=== Kadumanga ===
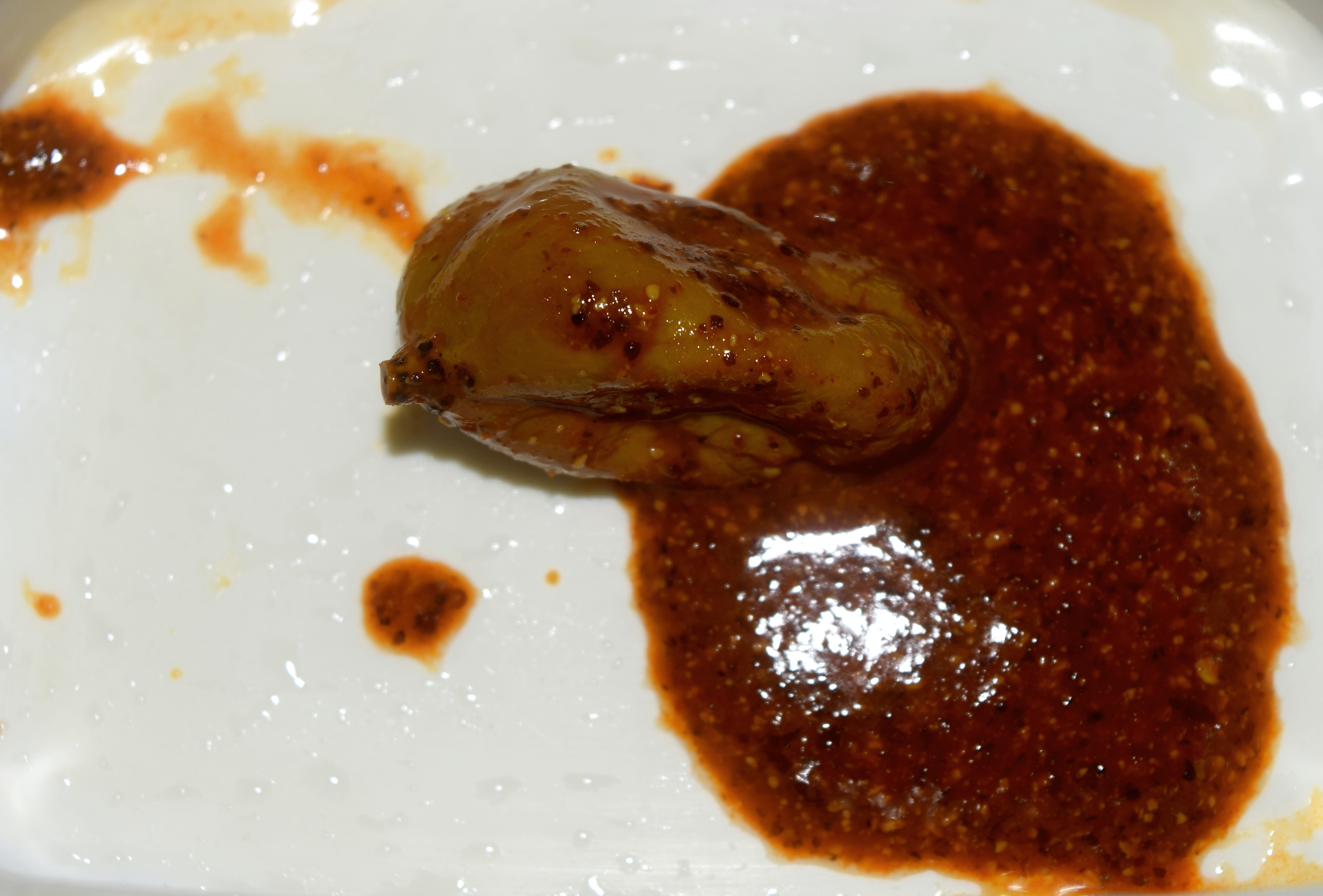
Kadumanga – a special kind of mango pickle from Kerala, India, made from tender mango

This is a variation of mango pickle. This kind of pickle is made from tender mango. The small mangoes are collected when the mangoes just start to grow. In this pickle the mango is not cut into pieces; the whole mango is prepared as a form of pickle.

=== Pickled mango chutney ===
This is a variation where mangoes are grated to produce a chutney-like pickle.

== See also ==
- Burong mangga – Filipino side dish
- Chhundo – Kind of Indian pickle from Gujarat
- Indian cuisine – Culinary traditions
- Mixed pickle – Pickles made from a variety of vegetables mixed in the same pickling process
- Pickled fruit – Fruit that has been preserved by anaerobic fermentation in brine or immersion in vinegar
- Pickling – Procedure of preserving food in brine or vinegar
- South Asian pickles – Pickled varieties of vegetable and fruit
