= Amba (condiment) =

Mango pickle condiment

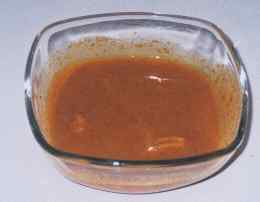
- Alternative names: Amba sauce
- Type: Condiment; spread; dip
- Place of origin: Iraq; India
- Region or state: South Asia; Middle East; Europe; United States
- Created by: Sassoon family
- Main ingredients: Mango pickle
- Variations: South Asian pickle
- Similar dishes: Chutney

Amba or anba (Arabic: عنبة, (Note: but also misspelled عمبة, أمبة, همبة) Hebrew: עמבה (Note: note the name of a type of preserve, Classical Syriac: ܐܡܒܓܐ, romanized: ambāḡa, loaned from Middle Persian)) is a tangy condiment made with mango pickle. Created by Iraqi Jewish merchants in Bombay who purportedly shipped mangoes in vinegar back to Baghdad, Amba bears a resemblance to chutneys from South Asia. The spicy, sweet and sour sauce is typically made of pickled green mangoes, vinegar, salt, turmeric, chilies, and fenugreek. It is enjoyed in various Middle Eastern countries, particularly in Israel, as well as to a lesser extent in Europe and the United States (largely among the Iraqi, Jewish, and Assyrian diaspora).

== Etymology ==
Mangoes being native to South Asia, the name "amba" seems to have been borrowed, via Arabic, from the Marathi word āmbā (आंबा), which is in turn derived from the Sanskrit word āmra (आम्र, "mango").

== History ==
The origins of amba, which resembles the variety of South Asian pickle known as aam ka achar, can possibly be traced to savoury mango chutneys. During the 19th-century, Jewish merchants from Baghdad, Iraq, began to relocate to the southern port city of Basra, from where they began conducting trade with South Asia. These merchants exported such local commodities as dates and Arabian horses, while at the same time importing various spices and fabrics from India. Eventually, some of these traders began to settle in the Indian cities of Bombay, Pune, and Calcutta. According to the legend, amba was developed by members of one such family—the Sassoons of Bombay, who shipped the mangoes to Basra in barrels of vinegar. In the days before refrigeration, pickling was widely employed as a proven method for preservation of perishables such as vegetables and fruits.

From Basra, the mangoes made their way to Baghdad's Jewish market—known as Souk Hennouni—and the neighbouring Shorja marketplace. Souk Hennouni's Abu El Saad Street vendors would transfer the product from these barrels into smaller ones, where it would then be diluted with a spice mix. In its simplest form, amba as a sandwich was the ideal Iraqi street food. A serving of amba in a hot samoon was a satisfying portion. In an article titled "Talking about the food of amba and samoon", Khalid Kishtainy, a columnist at Asharq Al-Awsat, reminisced that in the Baghdad of his youth, school children would rush out of school to get samoon with amba from the street vendor, who, if generous, would add a little more amba. The condiment is now frequently used in Iraqi cuisine, especially as a spicy sauce to be added to fish dishes, falafel, kubbah, kebabs, and eggs.

== Ingredients ==
There are different configurations of amba, depending upon the region. The standard list of ingredients consists of pickled green mangoes, vinegar, salt, turmeric, chilies, and fenugreek. The Indian variety uses some of these, along with mustard seed. The Iraqi version typically adds a combination of boiled turnips, carrots, and potatoes to the mix, along with peaches, zucchini, okra, other-than-green peppers, coriander seed and curry powder. This gives the sauce a chunkier texture, instead of the smoother consistency of other combinations. Commercially produced amba of the chunky variety is usually packed in wide-mouthed glass bottles, which allows the product to be dispensed easily, while thinner versions can be pouched.

== Distribution ==
In addition to its places of origin in India and Iraq, amba is popular in the western part of the Arabian Peninsula, where it is sold in sealed jars or by the kilo. It is eaten with bread as part of nawashef (a mixed platter of small plates containing different types of cheese, egg dishes, pickles, ful mudammas, falafel, mutabbag, offal) and rice type meals at breakfast or dinner in the Hejaz.

Amba was brought to Israel by Iraqi Jewish immigrants in the 1950s, who used it as an accompaniment to their Shabbat morning meal. It has since become very popular in Israel and Palestine. The condiment is found in Sephardi cuisine and Mizrahi cuisine. Now one of the most common condiments in Israel, it is used in sandwiches and as a topping for hummus and other mezzes. It is often served as a dressing on shawarma sandwiches, falafels, and usually on sabikh and as an optional topping on meorav yerushalmi, kebab and salads. Other Iraqi emigrants—such as Assyrians and Chaldeans—brought the condiment with them to their new communities in the United States and other places, so that amba is now known to a much wider audience than its original one.

== In literature ==
In his memoir Baghdad Yesterday Sasson Somekh dedicates an entire chapter to amba and the impression it left on him as a youth. He uses amba to tell the story of the Iraqi Jewish community that had satellite communities in India and Southeast Asia. In the same chapter, Somekh references another Iraqi, who wrote a short story about amba (Abd al-Malik Noori, "It happened on a Friday"). In her memoir Chopping Onions on my Heart or Always Carry Salt Samantha Ellis devotes a whole chapter to amba.

== Bibliography ==
- Monterescu, Daniel; Hart, Joel (1 June 2018). "The Mango Sauce Connecting Indians, Israelis and Palestinians – and Taking High-end Restaurants by Storm". Haaretz.
