= Dalle Khursani =

Spicy Chilli

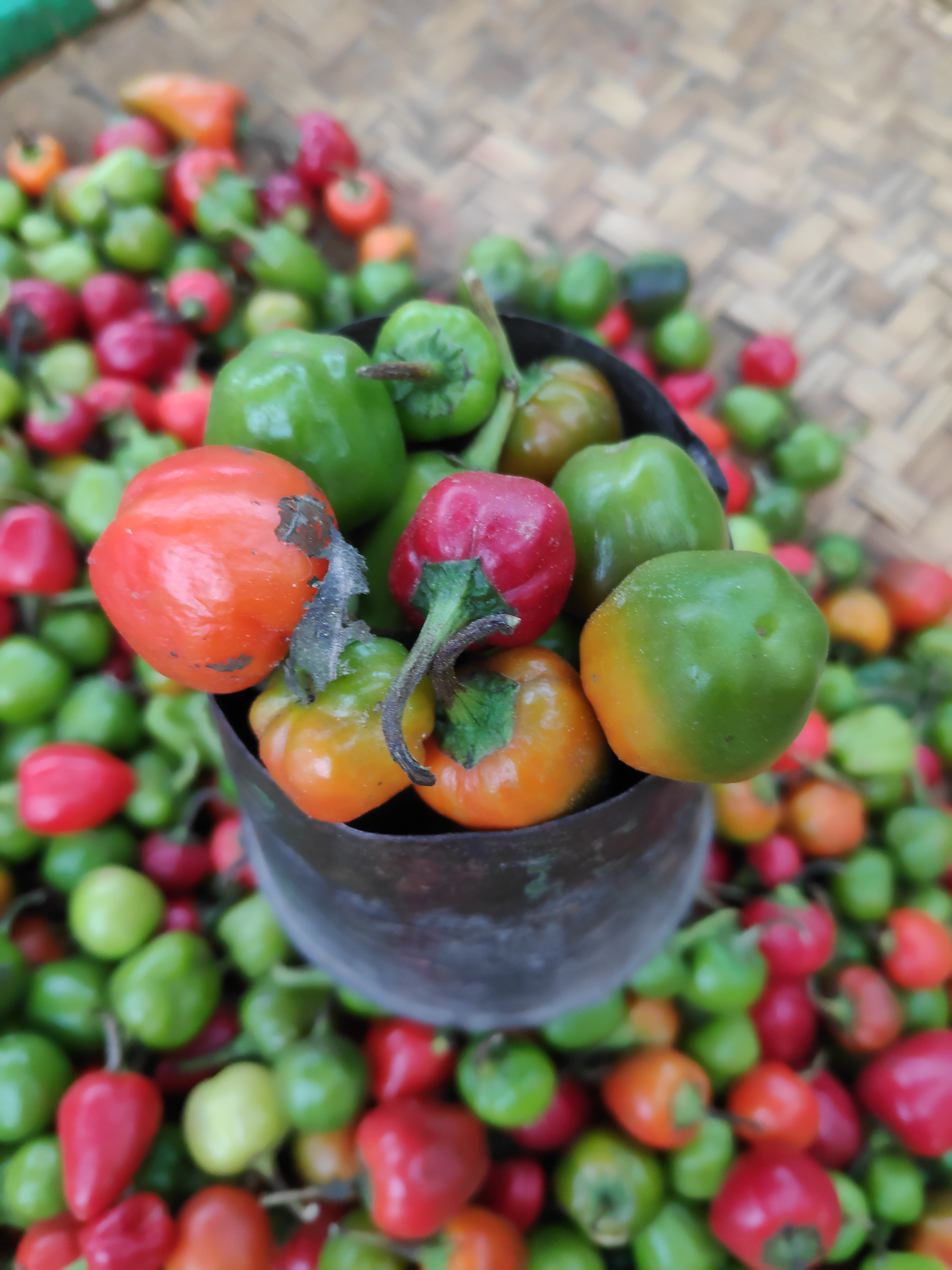
- Species: Capsicum annuum
- Cultivar: Dalle Khursani
- Origin: Sikkim
- Heat: Very hot
- Scoville scale: 100,000 – 350,000 SHU

Dalle Khursani (Nepali: डल्ले खुर्सानी, Sikkimese: ཁ་ཚ་ཏྲི kha tsha tri), Akabare Khursani, red cherry pepper chilli or simply Dalle is a variety of chilli pepper primarily cultivated in Nepal, Bhutan, the Indian state of Sikkim, and the Darjeeling and Kalimpong districts of Indian state of West Bengal. Its pungency ranges between 100,000 and 350,000 SHU (Scoville heat units), similar to the Habanero chilli pepper.

== Etymology ==
The name Dalle Khursani literally translates to ‘round chillies’ in Nepali, owing to its physical attributes. In Nepal, it is also called Akabare Khursani (lit. king of chillies) or Jyaanamara Khursani (lit. murderer chillies).

In the Sikkimese Bhutia language, it is known as kha tsha tri (lit. Round chille).

== Plant ==
Dalle Khursani are the only known polyploidal variety of pepper. The plant belongs to the family Solanaceae and genus Capsicum. It grows up to 100-130 cm height in an open field and 150-180 cm height in greenhouse conditions.

=== Fruit ===
The chilli is high in vitamin A, vitamin E, and potassium, and low in sodium. One hundred grams of fresh dalle khursani have 240 mg of vitamin C (five times higher than an orange), 11,000 IU of vitamin A, and 0.7 mg of vitamin E. Its pungency ranges between 100,000 and 350,000 SHU (Scoville heat units), similar to the Habanero chilli pepper.

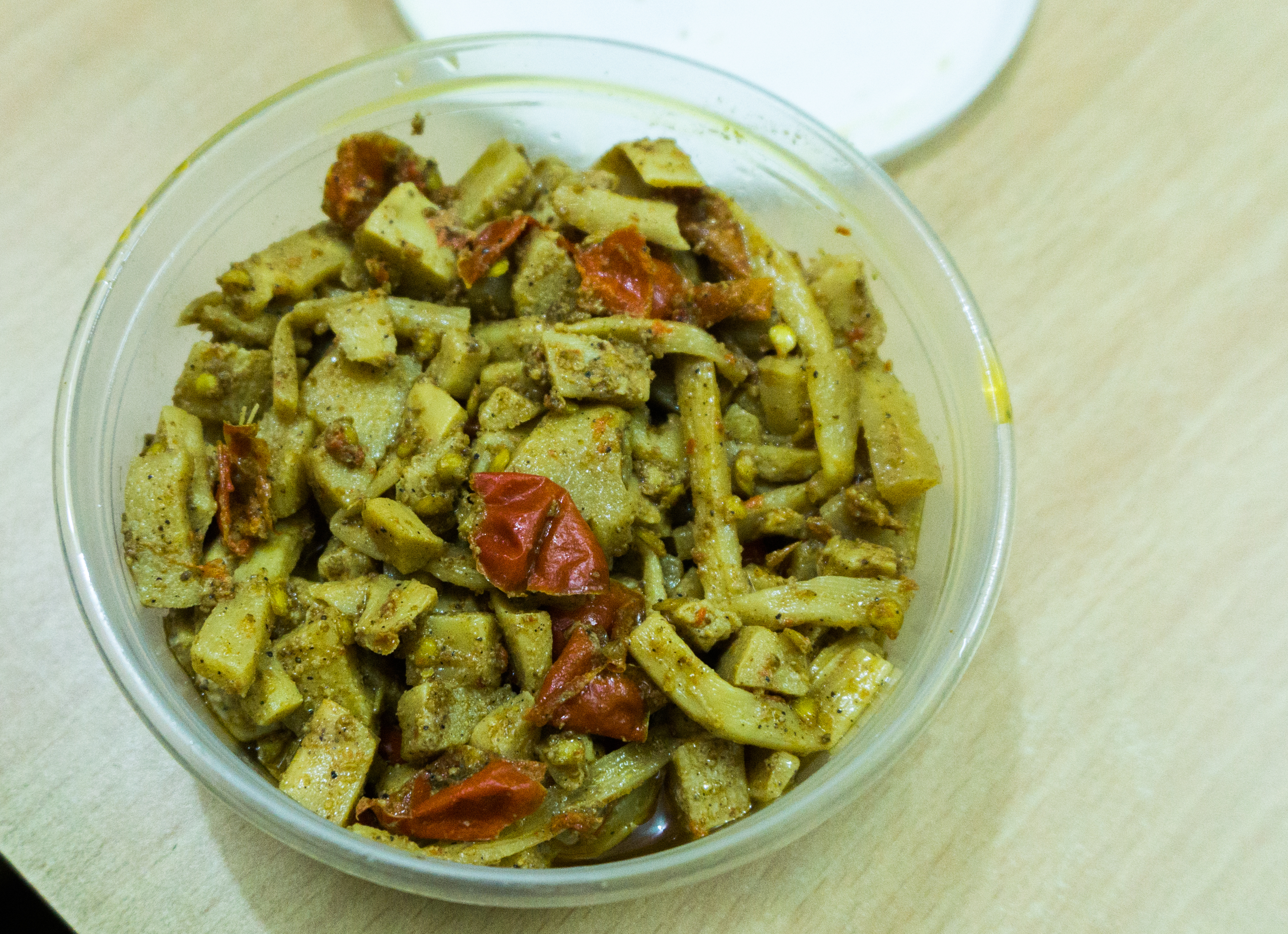
Dalle Khursani and Tama (Fermented Bamboo Shoot) achaar, a popular Nepali pickle

== Serving methods ==
- Whole chilli: as a relish eaten with Dal bhat.
- Chopped: used in various vegetable and meat curries.
- Paste: as chutneys and sauces for Momo.
- Pickle: Dalle Achaar
- Fermented: fermented with yak–buttermilk

== Trade ==
In 2019 Sikkim produced around 250 tonnes of dalle khursani. Around 60 percent of the state's production of the chilli is consumed within the state; a major portion of the rest is sold in North Bengal and Northeast India. The state government-owned Sikkim Supreme procured 50 tonnes of the chilli that year to make pickles and pastes.

=== Geographical Indication ===
In 2020 India's department of Industry Promotion and Internal Trade granted the Geographic Indication (GI) tag for the chilli to the Indian state of Sikkim based on application filed by the North Eastern Regional Agricultural Marketing Corporation. In September 2021 the GI tag was extended to the neighbouring Darjeeling and Kalimpong districts where the chilli has also been grown for ages.
