= Hyderabadi pickle =

Type of Pakistani pickle

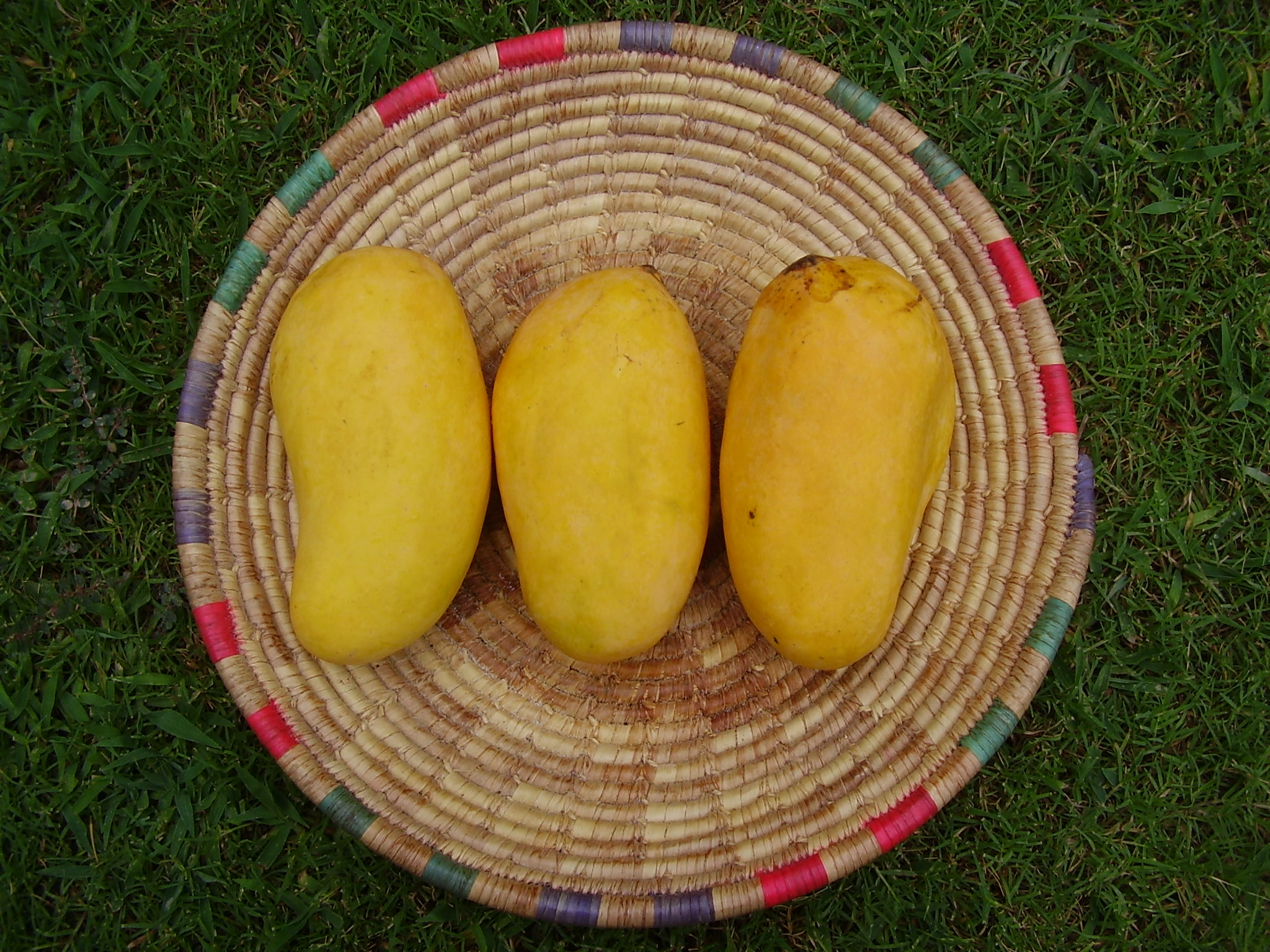
As a fruit traditionally native and abundant in Mirpur Khas, Sindh, Pakistan, mangos are used in numerous Pakistani foods and recipes such as the Hyderabadi mango pickle.

The Hyderabadi pickle (Sindhi: حیدرآبادی اچار 'Hiderabadi achar') is a type of Pakistani pickle from Hyderabad, Sindh, Pakistan. The pickle can come in various flavours, from a delicate mixed assortment of fruits (most notably mangos) and vegetables matured through natural processes, and carefully selected spices made and preserved in a traditional method.

== See also ==
- Indian cuisine
- Hyderabadi cuisine
- Sindhi cuisine
