= South Asian pickle =

Pickled varieties of vegetable and fruit

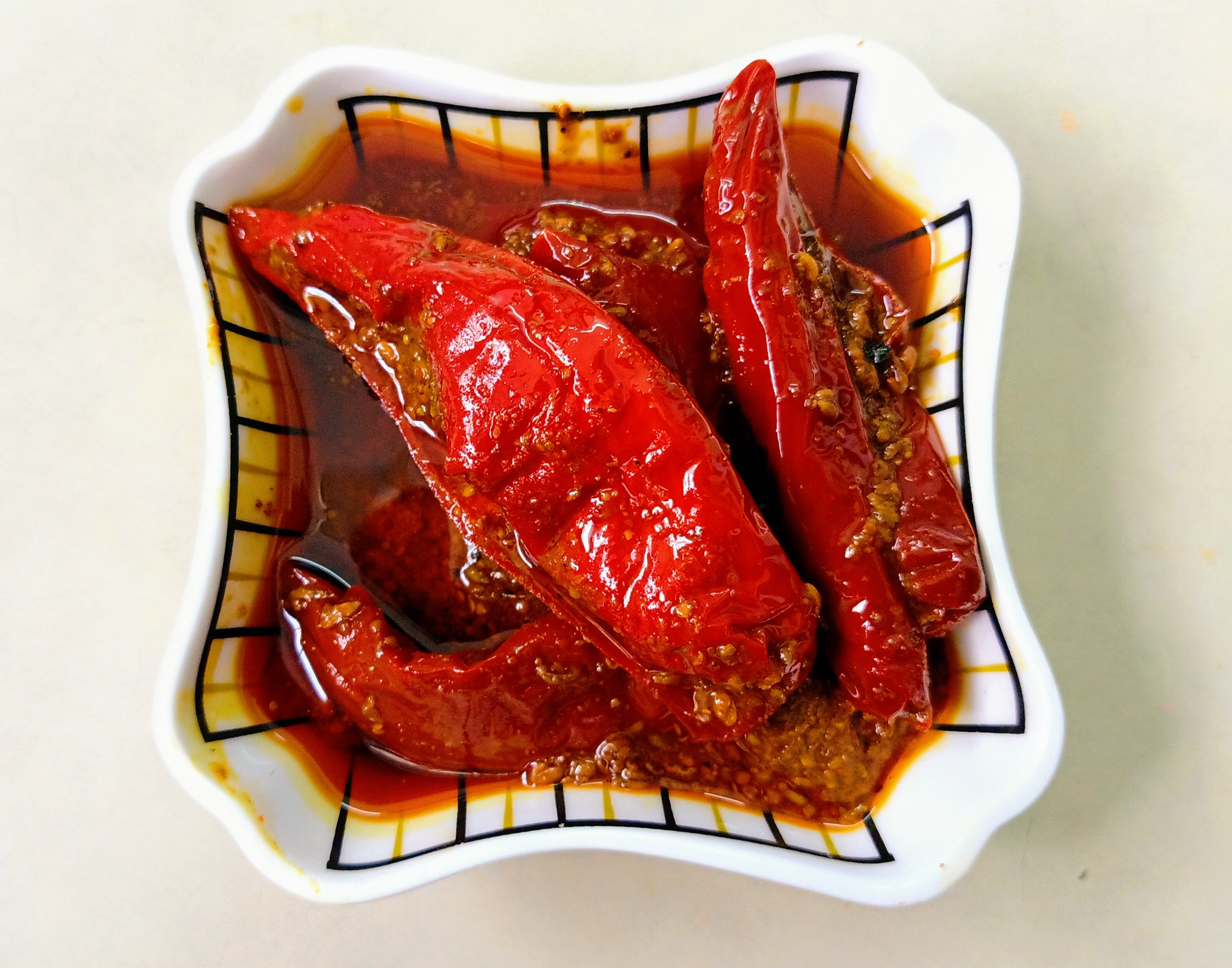
- Chilli pickle in India
- Alternative names: Achar, amchar, khatai, pacchadi, loncha, oorugai, avakaai
- Type: Pickle
- Course: Condiment
- Place of origin: India, Bangladesh, Nepal, Pakistan, Sri Lanka, Myanmar, Trinidad and Tobago, Guyana, Suriname, Mauritius, Fiji
- Region or state: Indian subcontinent
- Main ingredients: Fruit (mango, plums), vegetables, or meat
- Ingredients generally used: Oil, chili powder, spices, mustard seeds, fennel seeds
- Variations: Acar, atchara

South Asian pickles, known as achar among other names, are pickled and often highly spiced condiments made from a variety of vegetables and fruits preserved in brine, vinegar, edible oils, and South Asian spices. The pickles are popular across South Asia, with many regional variants. They have accompanied many main dishes since the Columbian exchange in 1492, which brought chili peppers to India. Earlier South Asian cuisines used black pepper and long pepper for pungency. Today, achar has expanded from a home prepared staple into a globally commercialized product, while continuing to play an important role in South Asian cultural identity and increasingly appearing in modern fusion cuisines.

== Terminology ==
In Hindi and several other South Asian languages, pickles are known as achār (अचार ). Early Sanskrit and Tamil literature uses the terms Avalehika, Upadamzam, Sandhita, and Avaleha.

Āchār is a Persian origin word, from the time of the Mughal Empire. However, pickles in India are quite unlike the vinegar-based pickles of the Middle East. In Persian, the word āchār is defined as "powdered or salted meats, pickles, or fruits, preserved in salt, vinegar, honey, or syrup".

In the 18th century, Georg Eberhard Rumphius suggested that the Indian word achar came from America, specifically Arawakan (of the Caribbean) axi, achi, "chili pepper", widely used in pickles. The 1886 Anglo-Indian dictionary Hobson-Jobson suggests a derivation from Latin acetaria.

== History ==
=== Ancient and medieval ===
Early pickle recipes in Ayurvedic and Sangam period texts mention several varieties of pickles, including the earliest known mention of mango pickles. Nalachampu, a Sanskrit epic written by Trivikrama Bhatta in 915 CE, describes pickles made from green mango, green peppercorns, long pepper, raw cardamom, lemon, lime, myrobalan, hog plum, stone apple, and fragrant manjack. Early medieval cookbooks such as Lokopakara (1025 CE), Manasollasa (1130 CE), Pakadarpana (1200 CE), and Soopa Shastra (1508 CE), and Kshemakutuhala (1549 CE) mentions pickle recipes that use green mango, green peppercorns, longpepper, lemons and limes, turmeric root, mango-ginger root, ginger, radish, bitter gourd, cucumber, lotus root, and bamboo shoots. The religious text Lingapurana by Gurulinga Desika (1594 CE) mentions more than fifty kinds of pickles. Unique pickles made from edible flowers are also mentioned in the Ni'matnama (1500 CE) cookbook.

=== Columbian exchange ===
Chili peppers were introduced to South Asia by Portuguese traders after the Columbian exchange (sometime after 1492) in ports controlled by the Mughal Empire on the western coast of Gujarat. Before that, the milder spices black pepper, long pepper, and Piper chaba (in both fresh and dried forms) were the main source of heat in ancient and medieval Indian cuisine.

=== Anglo-Indian to British ===
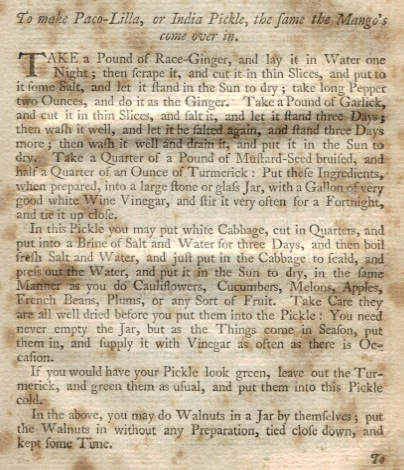
Hannah Glasse's recipe for "Paco-Lilla or India Pickle", 1758

Anglo-Indians during the British Raj greatly liked chutneys and pickles, and prepared many kinds. For the pickled varieties, vegetables such as aubergines and bell peppers may be packed with chilies, mustard seed, and turmeric to give them a strong flavour; these may be cooked in mustard oil or sesame oil. Some fruits are prepared by pickling, soaking mangoes and limes in salty water in a pot which is left in the sun. For the sweet chutneys, fruits such as mango are cooked with sugar, vinegar, and spices. Uncooked chutneys use ingredients such as green coriander leaves and coconut, flavoured with chili, tamarind, and sugar; these are prepared afresh each day.

In the 17th century, in the time of the East India Company, British travellers to India noticed the many chutneys and pickles. Sailors found that the preserve-like varieties were useful accompaniments to their maritime diet of salt meat and dry ship's biscuit. Quantities were brought home to Britain, whether by individual travellers or by merchants, soon to be copied by cooks and further modified from the Indian originals.

One of those cooks, Hannah Glasse, described how "to make Paco-Lilla, or India Pickle" (piccalilli) in the 1758 edition of her book The Art of Cookery Made Plain and Easy. Her recipe asked the cook to salt some ginger, long pepper, and garlic, and to spice vinegar with mustard seed and turmeric. She suggested that vegetables and fruits such as cabbage, cauliflower, cucumber, melon, apple, French beans, and plums could all be pickled in this way.

== Modern-Day ==
In modern-day South Asian countries, traditional foods such as achar continue to play an important role in cultural identity and the preservation of culinary heritage. Achar has been rooted in household food practices for many generations and continues to be a staple condiment and side dish for daily meals. It is still highly valued for its ability to enhance flavor and complement foods from across diverse regions. In South Asian society, achar has transitioned from a seasonal, home prepared necessity to a widely available commercial product. While many families still maintain the tradition of preparing pickles using methods involving oil, salt, and spices, urbanization and changing lifestyles have contributed to the growing popularity of store bought varieties.

Large scale production and distribution have enabled South Asian pickles to reach global markets, particularly through diaspora communities in areas such as the UK, United States, and Middle East. This expansion reflects much larger historical patterns of food exchange, such as how South Asian pickling practices have been subject to adaptation and reinterpretation beyond the traditional regions. At the same time, achar remains deeply embedded in local knowledge and culinary traditions, with preparation techniques and ingredients continuing to reflect regional environments and cultural practices. While achar is now widely available, evidence suggests that the personalized traditional methods of fermentation provide unique and distinct flavors.

In addition to its traditional uses, achar has increasingly been incorporated into contemporary and fusion cuisines. Chefs and food entrepreneurs have begun integrating its unique flavors into non traditional formats, blending South Asian pickles with global food trends. This type of evolution highlights achar's continued relevance as both a cultural staple and an interesting component in modern cuisine.

== Commercialization ==
Traditionally, South Asian Pickles were jarred and fermented at home, but now families more commonly buy their jars from stores. This transition has happened because of its convenience, but also because it ensures safety since fermentation can be dangerous if not done correctly. Factory production ensures consistent safe production of the pickles because they must adhere to food regulations and have factory oversight. Pickles are normally sealed in glass jars and are ready to eat straight out of the jar.

Several companies produce packaged South Asian pickles for domestic and international markets. Mother's Recipe, founded in 2001 is an Indian manufacturer owned by Desai Foods, produces 36 pickle varieties along with other products and distributes its products internationally. The company manufactures all of its products in India.

Shan Foods, a Pakistani company founded in 1981 founded by Sikander Sultan and still family owned, produces 6 types of packaged pickles alongside other products and exports them internationally. Shan foods' products are certified as Halal.

== Ingredients ==
In India, there are two main types of pickles: pickles made with sesame or mustard oil, and pickles made without oil. Pickles without oil use salt to draw out the moisture from green mangoes or lemons to create a brine. A mixture of lemon or lime juice with salt or traditional ganne ka sirka (sugarcane vinegar) may also be used as brine. Some pickles such as those from Gujarat use jaggery sugar as the main preserve.

Homemade pickles are prepared in the summer. They are matured through exposure to sunlight for up to two weeks. The pickle is traditionally covered with muslin while it is maturing. Chili peppers are a distinguishing ingredient in South Asian pickles.

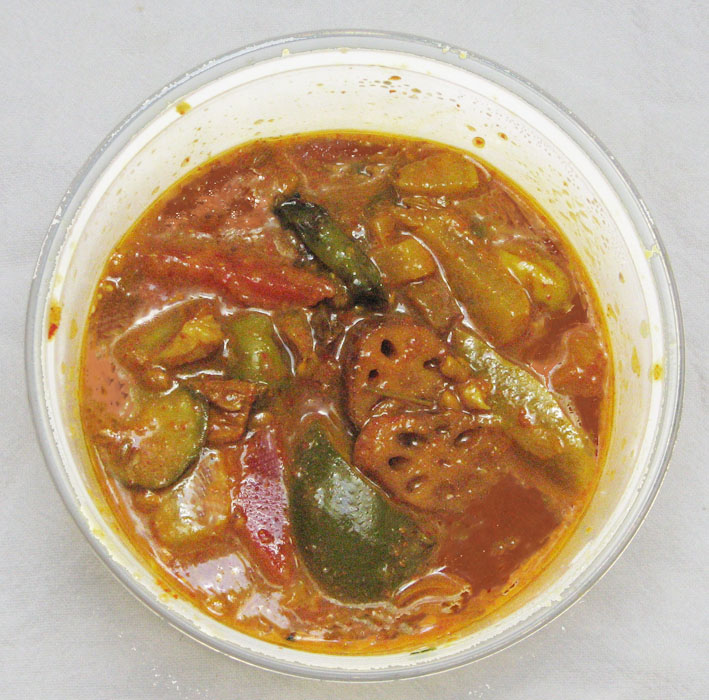
Indian mixed pickle, with lotus root, lemon, carrot, green mango, and green chilis

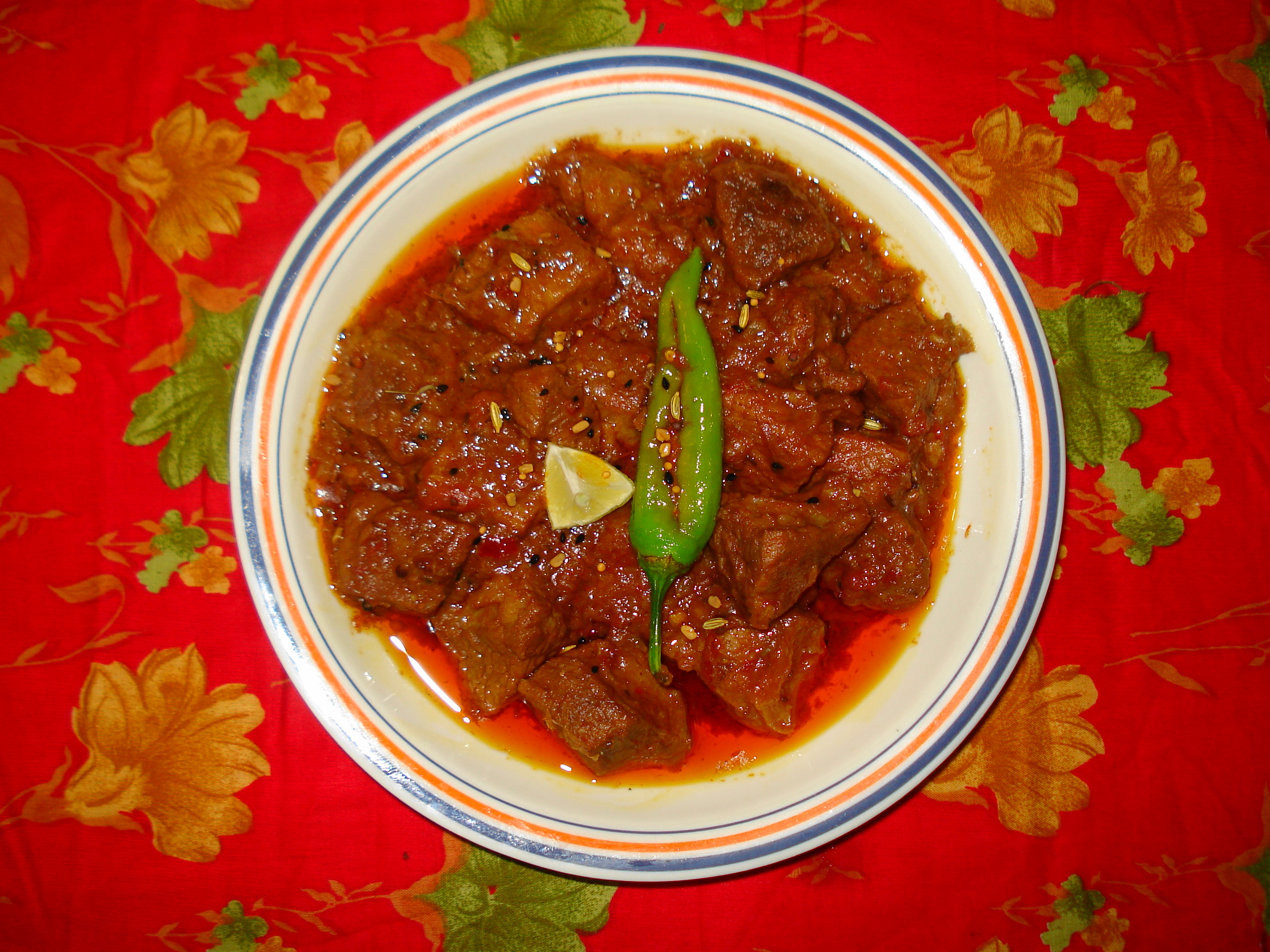
Achar gosht, a meat curry cooked with flavours from pickle

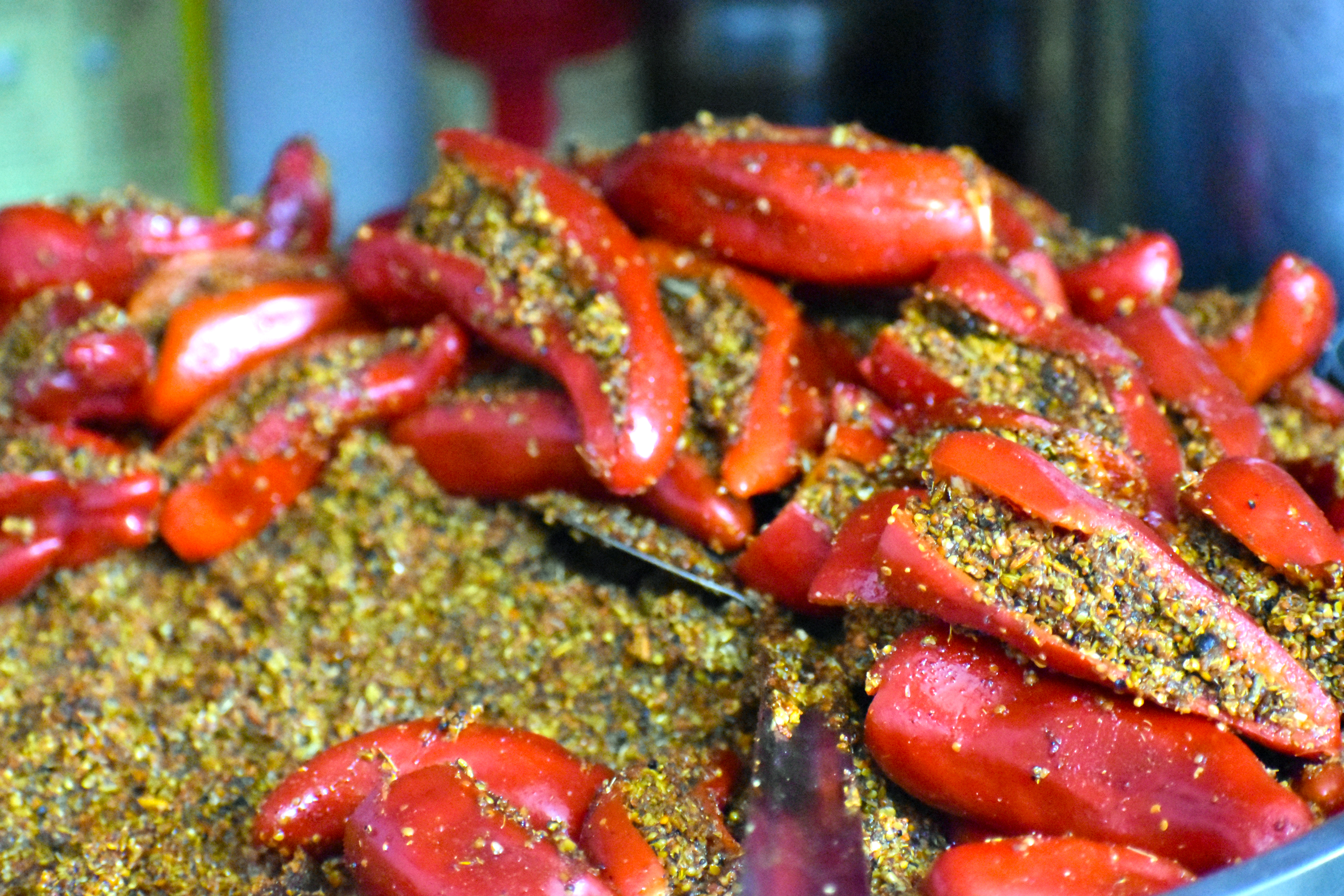
Preparation of red chilli Indian pickle

== Chemical Composition ==
The chemical composition of south Asian pickles varies between the many different types. The chemical profile of South Asian Pickles is defined primarily by a high concentrations of organic acids, sodium chloride, and phenolic compounds derived from spices and vegetables. The most common organic acids are lactic acid most commonly produced through fermentation. These organic acids lower the pH of the pickle, which is the primary mechanism by which microbial spoilage is suppressed. Lactic acid bacteria plays a central role in this fermentation process. These microorganisms convert sugars present in vegetables and fruits into lactic acid, driving the acidification that preserves the food. The specific strains of lactic acid bacteria present during fermentation vary by region and preparation method. This microbial diversity is directly linked to the distinct flavors and health properties of different achar varieties.

Spices such as mustard seeds, turmeric, chili powder, fenugreek, and asafetida contribute significant quantities of phenolic compounds in the fermentation process of South Asian pickles. These compounds function as both flavoring agents and natural antimicrobials. Phenolics such as curcumin from turmeric and capsaicin from chili peppers have been shown to possess antioxidant and antimicrobial properties that complement the acidic preservation environment. Oil based pickles common in northern and western India present a somewhat different chemical profile, as the oil medium creates an anaerobic environment that prevents aerobic spoilage bacteria. In these preparations. mustard oil and sesame oil also contribute glucosinolate and lignans respectively, which add to the antimicrobial and nutritional properties of the final product.

== Regional variations ==
=== Bangladesh ===
In Bengali culture, pickles are known as Achar (Bengali: আচার) or Asar (Bengali: আসার). They are an integral part of Bengali cuisine, adding flavours to meals. They are made by preserving various fruits, vegetables, and even fish or meat in a mixture of spices, oil, and vinegar or lemon juice. The process involves marinating the chosen ingredient with a blend of spices such as mustard seeds, fenugreek, nigella seeds, and chili powder. The pickles are then left to mature in airtight jars, allowing the flavours to develop over time.

Bengali pickles have tangy, spicy, and sometimes sweet taste profiles. They are often served as accompaniments to rice, bread, or curry. Popular varieties include mango, lime, mixed vegetable, and fish pickles. The Shatkora achar of Sylhet and Chui jhal achar of Khulna are known even outside India and Bangladesh.

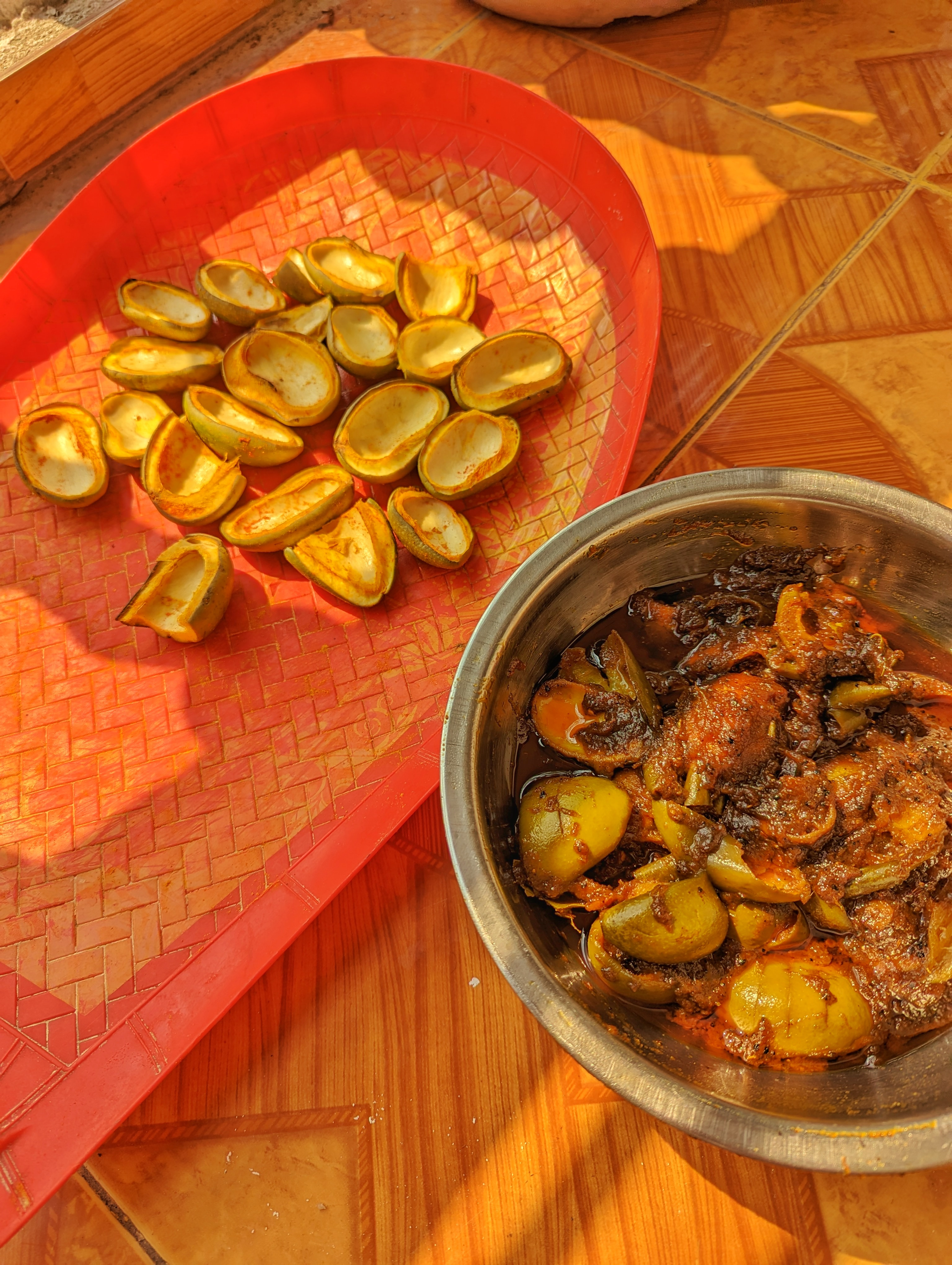
Making Bengali mango pickle

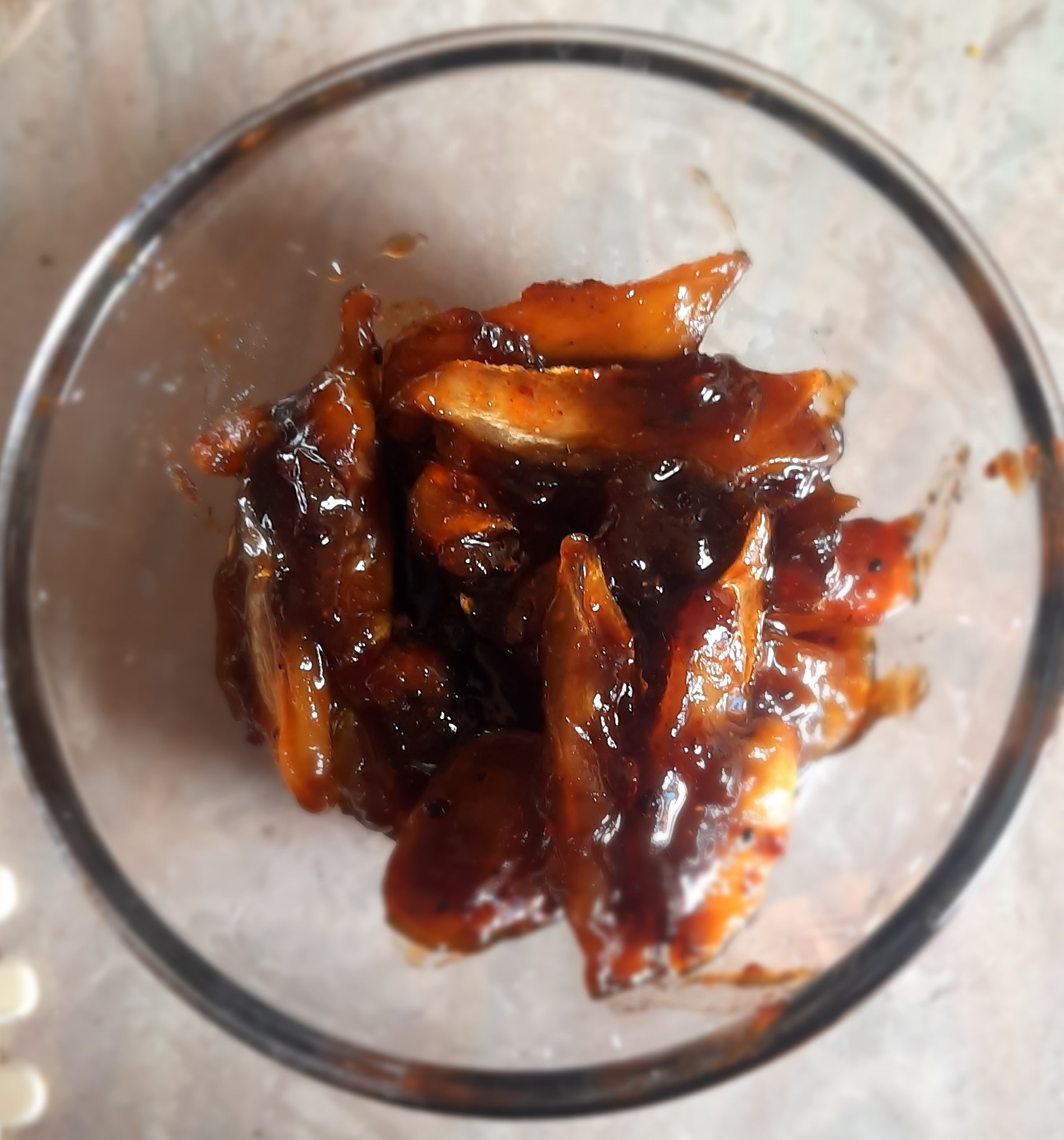
Mango and Date jaggery achar

=== India ===
Among the many regional variations in India, a lotus stem pickle is made in Kashmir; gongura leaves are used in Andhra Pradesh; prawns with garlic and curry leaves are pickled in the southern coastal state of Kerala; bamboo shoots are fermented with mustard seeds and oil in Assam; whole lemons are pickled with asafoetida, mustard seed, and turmeric in Maharashtra; Methia mango pickle from Gujarat is prepared from raw mangoes seasoned with fenugreek seeds, mustard, chilli and oil; whole garlic cloves form the base of a pickle in Karnataka; and tomatoes are pickled with mustard seed, red chili, and curry leaves in Tamil Nadu.

The city of Panipat in Haryana prepares achaar commercially, especially pachranga and satranga (literally "five/seven colours", prepared with that many vegetables). The vegetables are matured in mustard oil and whole spices with ingredients like raw mangoes, chickpeas, lotus stem, karonda, myrobalan, and limes. As of 2016, Panipat produced over ₹500 million (equivalent to ₹780 million or US$8.4 million in 2026) worth of achaar every year, supplied to local markets and exported to the UK, US, and Middle East.

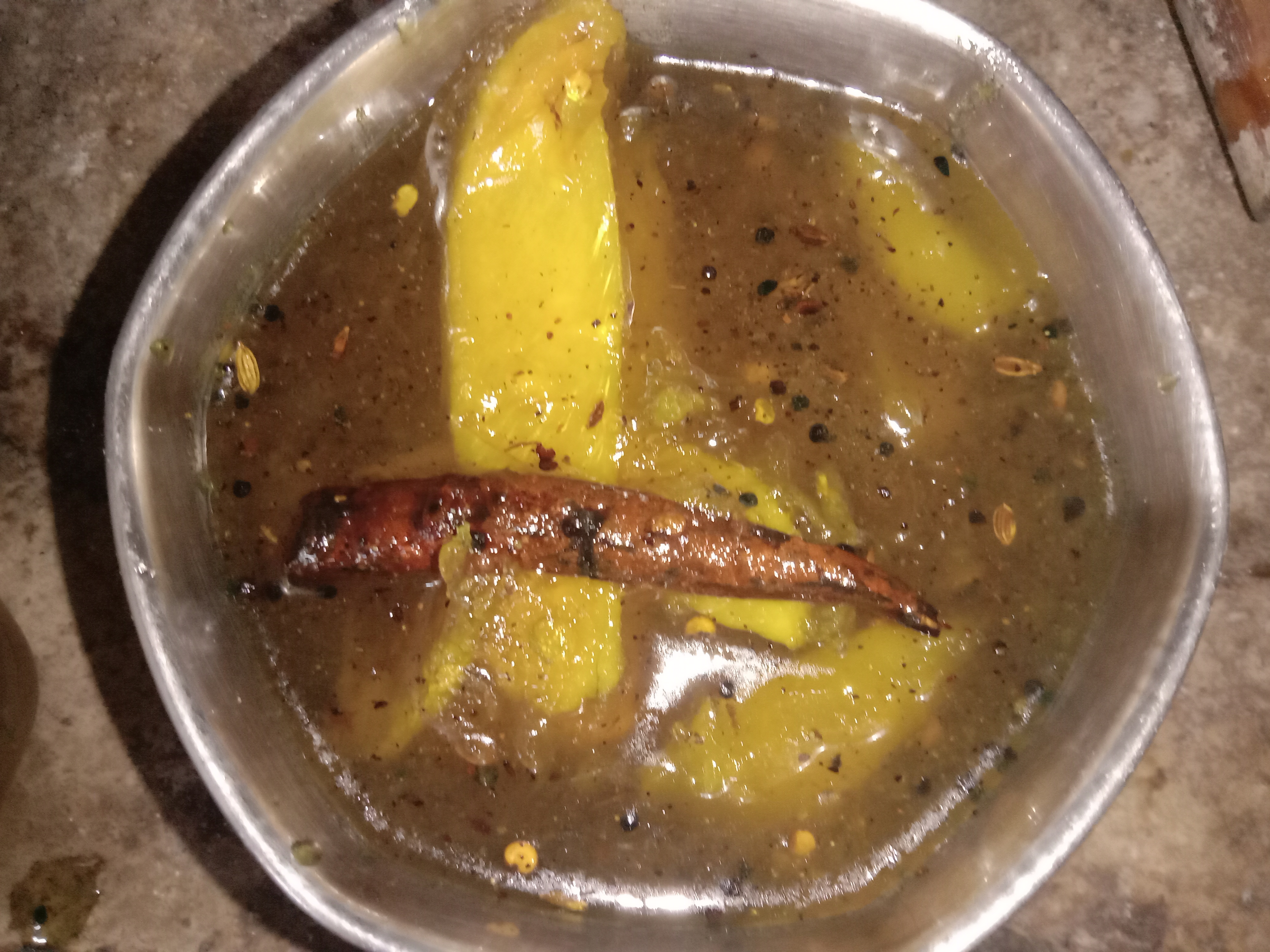
Sweet and spicy mango pickle

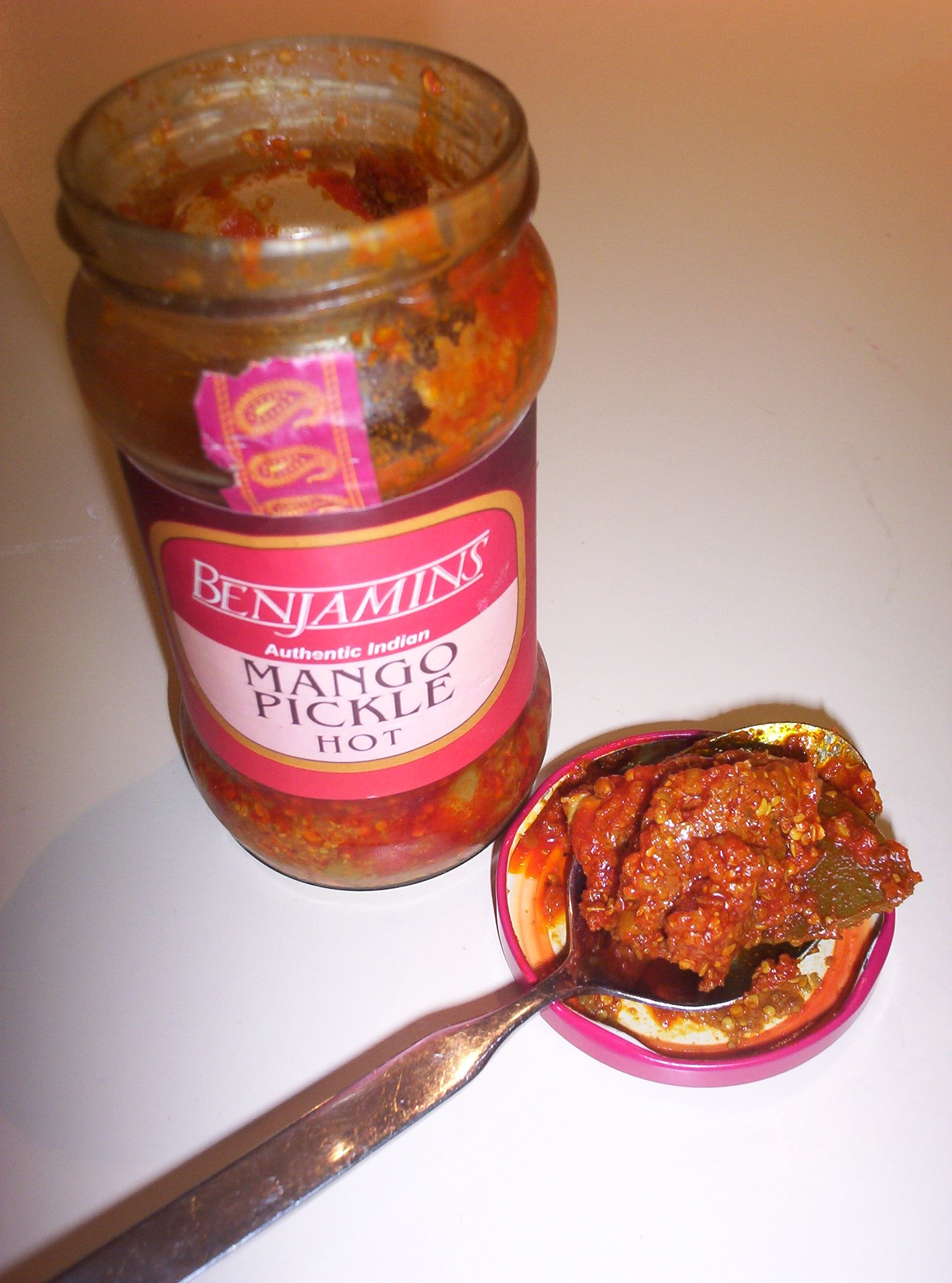
Indian spicy mango pickle

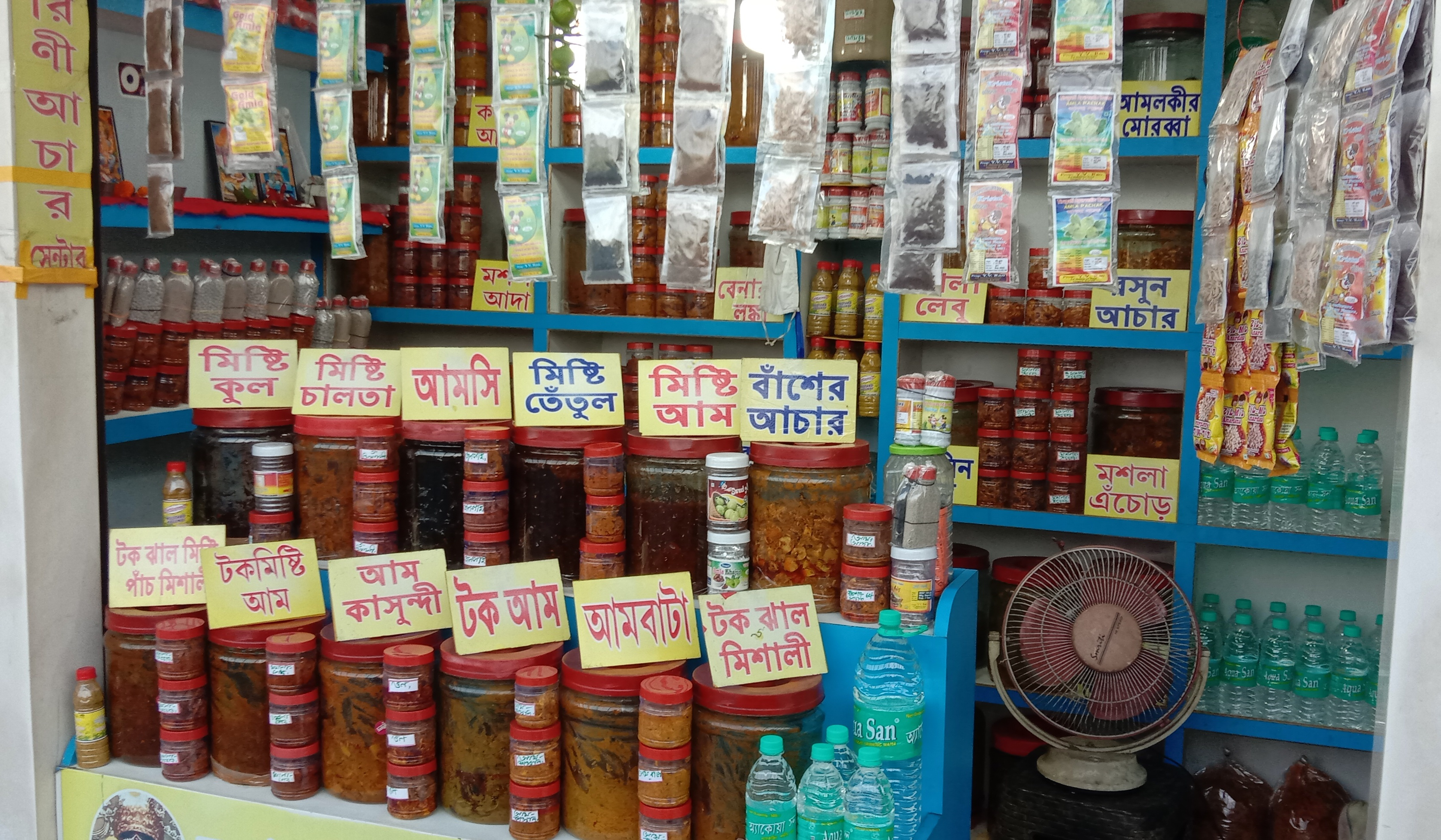
Pickles for sale in Kolkata

=== Myanmar (Burma) ===
The Burmese word for pickle is thanat (Burmese: သနပ်). Mango pickle (သရက်သီးသနပ်) (thayet thi thanat) is the most prevalent variety. The pickle is made with green, ripe, or dried mangoes cured in vinegar, sugar, salt, chili powder, masala, garlic, fresh chilies, and mustard seeds. Mango pickle is commonly used as a condiment alongside curries and biryani in Burmese cuisine. It is a mainstay ingredient in a Burmese curry, wet thanat hin (ဝက်သနပ်ဟင်း), that combines pork belly with the pickle.

=== Nepal ===
In Nepal, achaar (Nepali: अचार) is commonly eaten with the staple dal-bhat-tarkari as well as momo. Many achaar factories in Nepal are women-owned or operated by women.

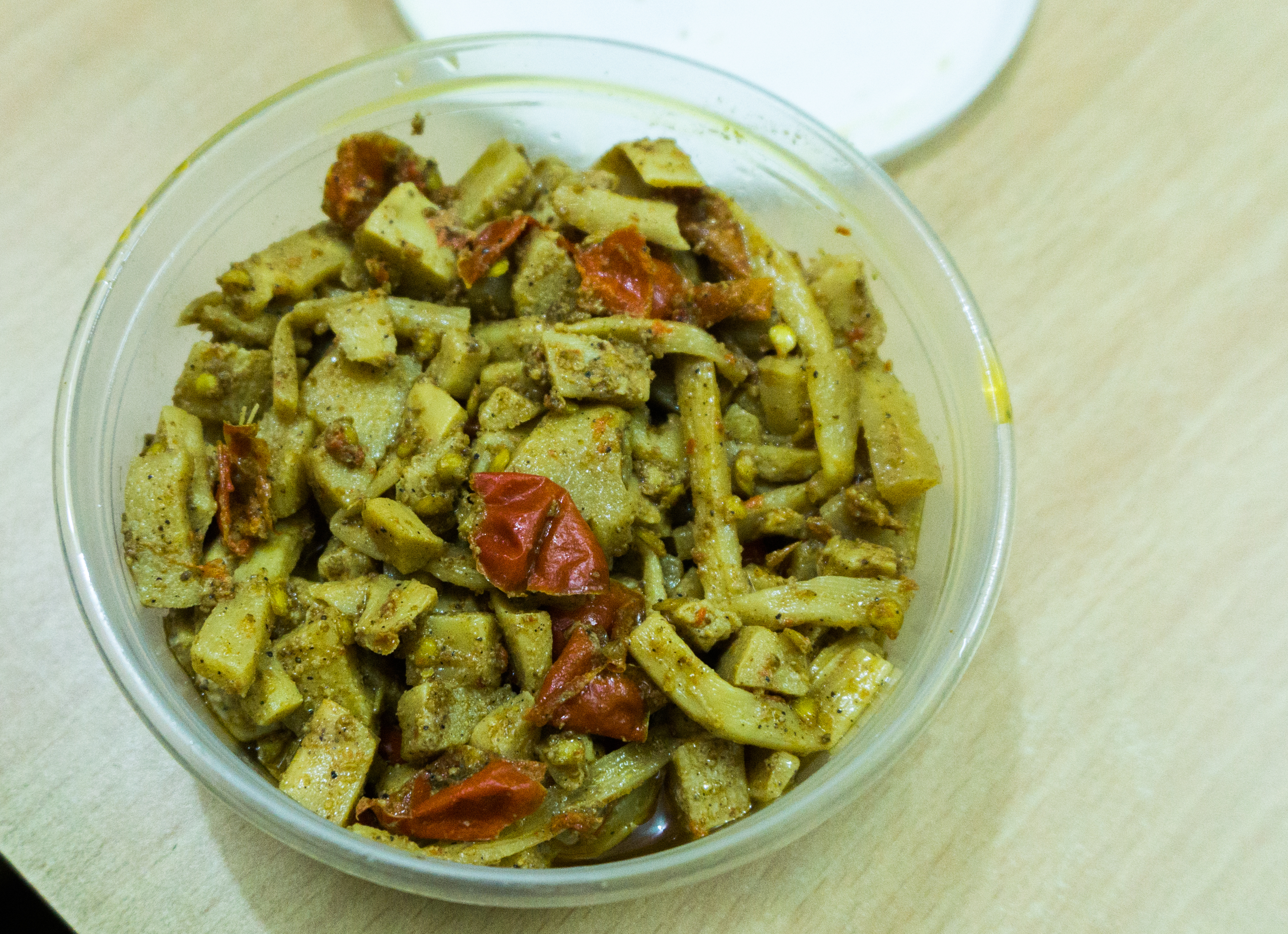
Nepali pickle made of Dalle Khursani (round chilies) and Tama (fermented bamboo shoot pickle)

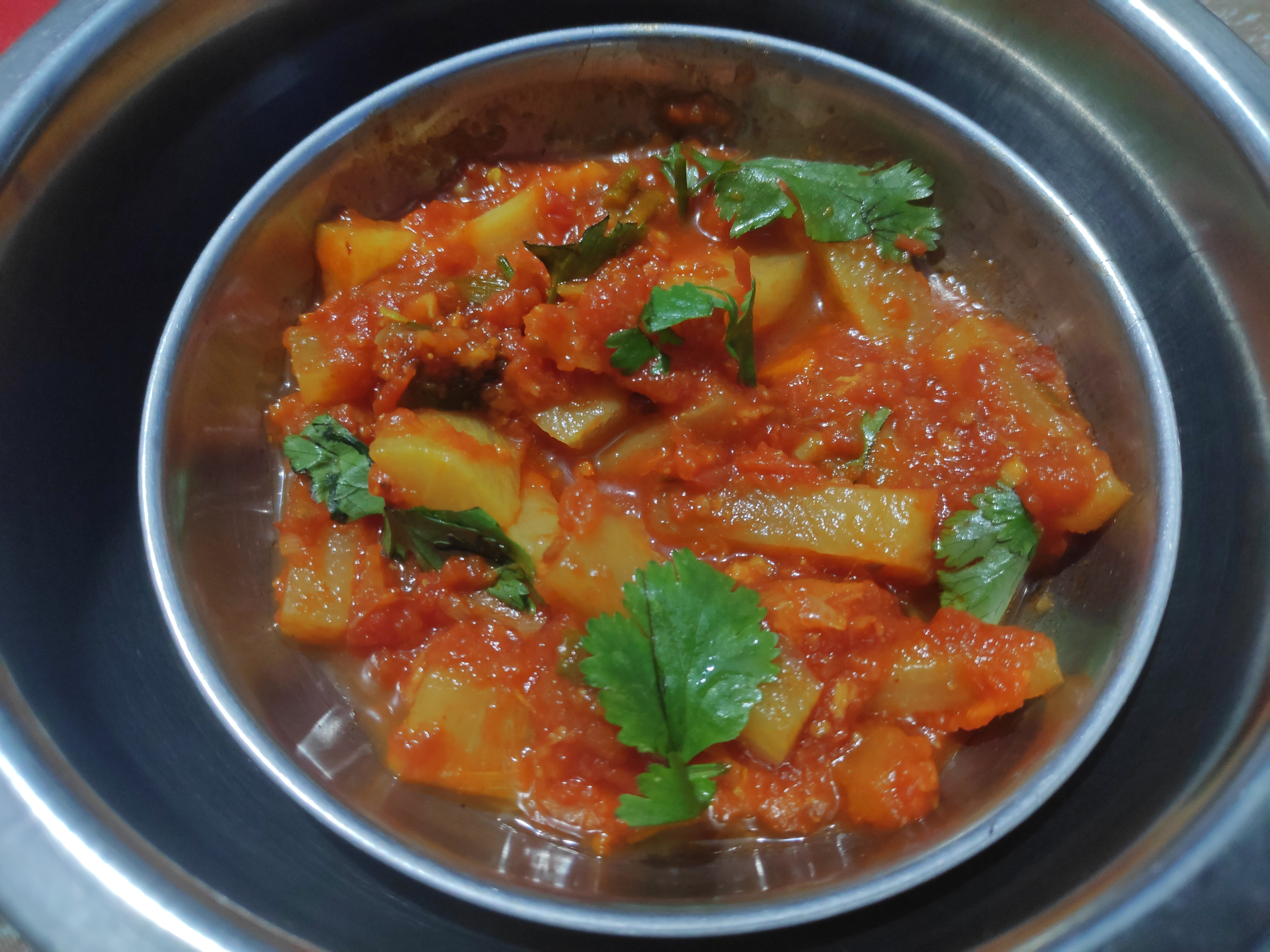
Mula Ko Aachar

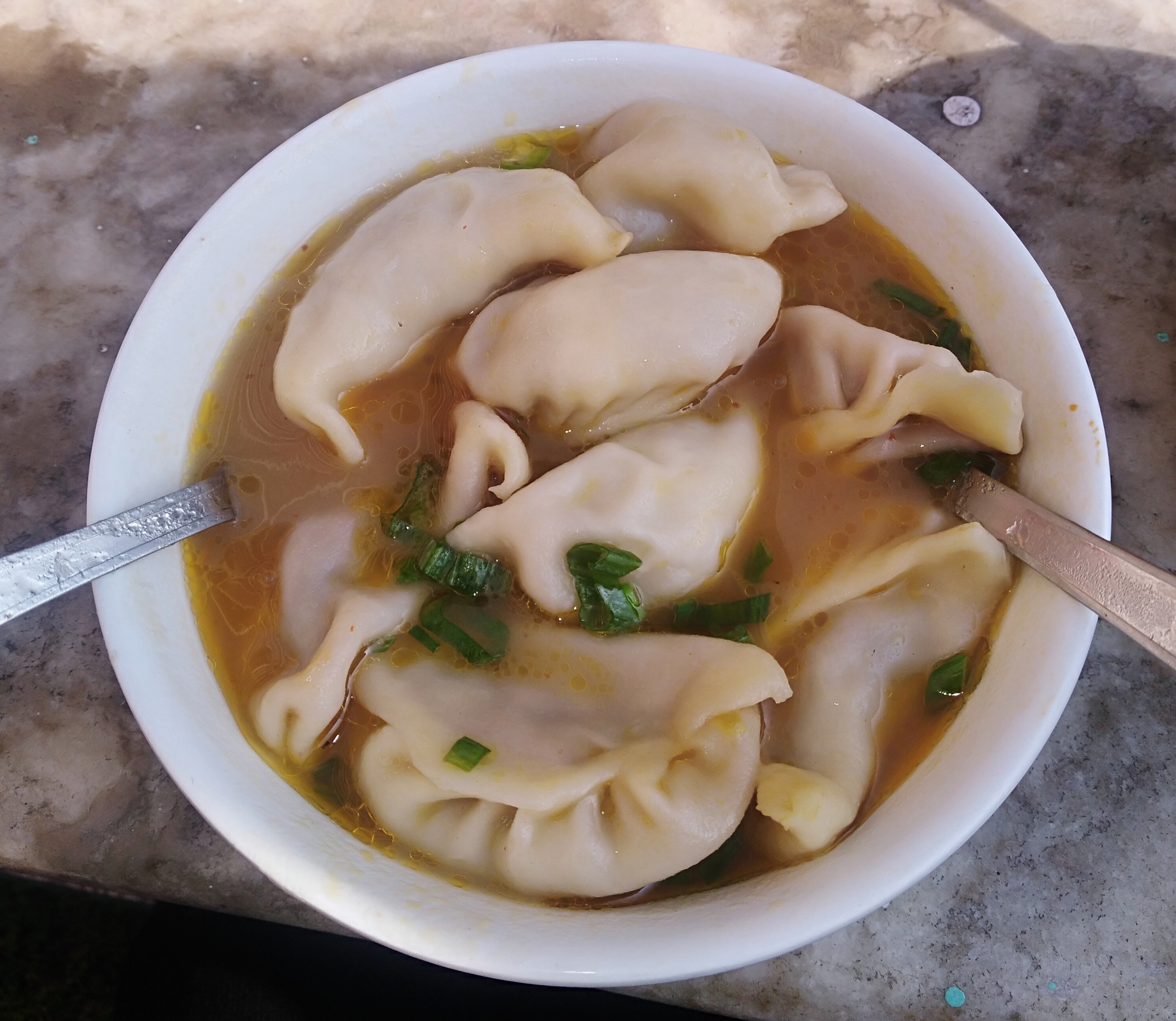
Broth made from achar used for jhol momo

=== Pakistan ===
The Sindh province of modern-day Pakistan is noted for its Shikrarpuri and Hyderabadi pickles. Both of these achaar varieties are commonly eaten in Pakistan and abroad. Shikrarpuri pickle is believed to have originated during the 1600s in medieval India. The most popular Shikarpuri achaar is a mixed pickle made of carrots, turnips, onions, cauliflower, chickpeas, garlic, green chillies, lime, and mango. Another pickle is made from fragrant manjack fruits.

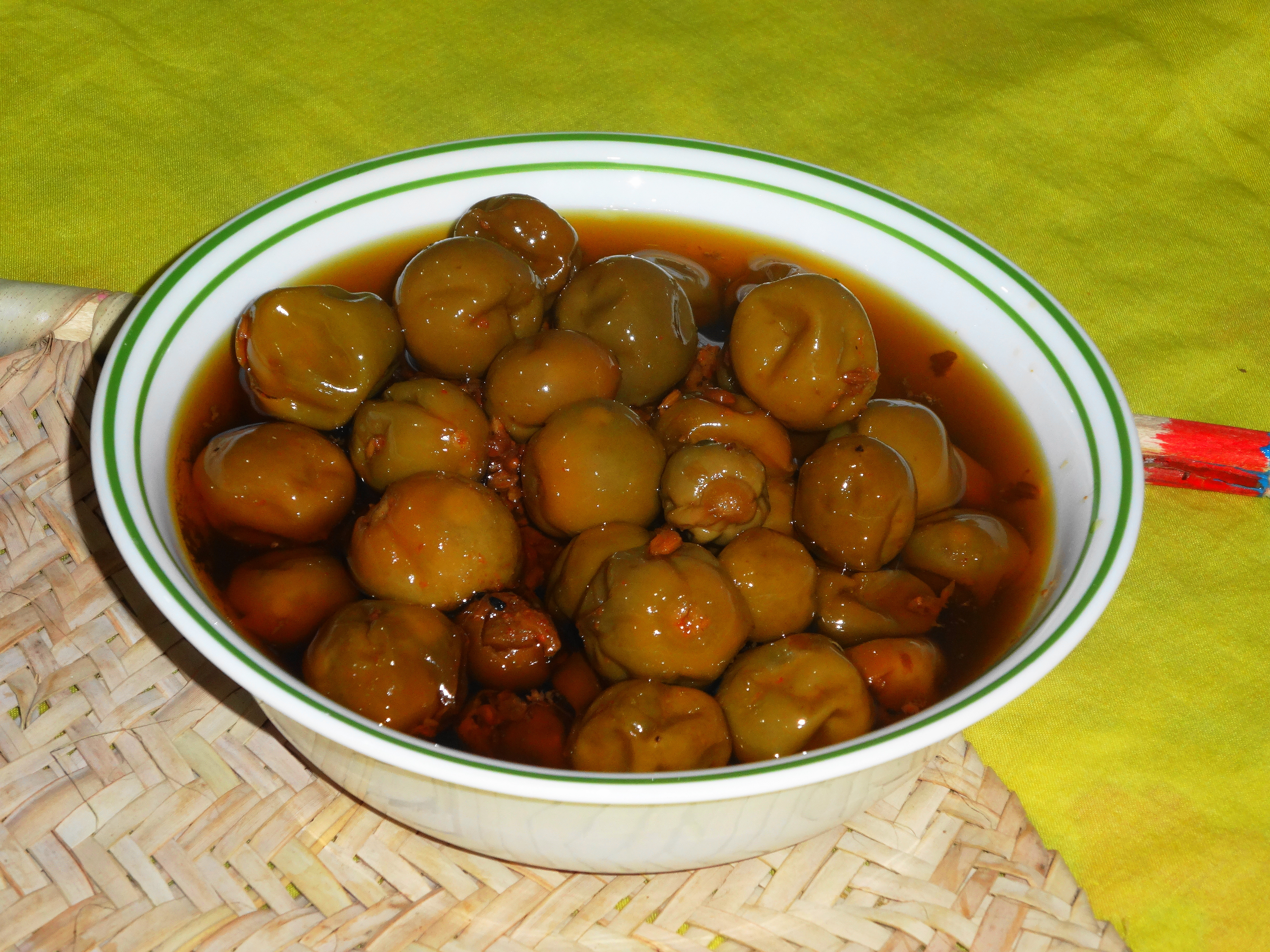
Lasora achar, with fragrant manjack berries

=== Sri Lanka ===
In Sri Lanka, green ginger, onion, and chilies are salted and flavoured with garlic, mustard seed, and vinegar. Other spices and sugar may be added. Either vegetables or fruits such as the Ceylon olive (veralu) or the hog plum (amberalla) may be used. Malay achcharu, a tradition Sri Lankan pickle, uses vegetables like carrots, capsicum, chillies, shallots, and garlic combined with mustard seeds and sweetened vinegar.

=== Middle East ===
- Amba is a sweetened mango pickle, brought back to Baghdad by Iraqi Jewish merchants from Bombay. It somewhat resembles a spicy mango chutney. It is used across the Middle East.

=== Africa ===
In South Africa, Botswana and Kenya, Indian pickles are called atchar. They are made primarily from unripe mangoes and are sometimes eaten with bread.

On Mauritius and Réunion a local variation is called Achard de légumes in French or Zasar legim in Mauritian Creole. It is prepared with a mixture of vegetables like cabbage, carrots, green beans, chayote, palm heart and onions. This is spiced with cumin, turmeric, green chilies, red chilies, ginger, garlic, salt and vinegar.

== See also ==
- Branston Pickle – British food brand known for its pickled chutney

== Sources ==
- Brown, Patricia (24 February 1998). Anglo-Indian Food and Customs. Penguin Books India. ISBN 0-14-027137-6.
- Collingham, Lizzie (2006) [2005 (Chatto & Windus)]. Curry: A Tale of Cooks and Conquerors. London: Vintage Books. ISBN 978-0-099-43786-4.
- Davidson, Alan (2014). Tom Jaine (ed.). The Oxford Companion to Food (3rd ed.). Oxford: Oxford University Press. ISBN 978-0-19-967733-7.
- Paralkar, Anil. 2020. "Trade, Exoticism and the English Appropriation of South Asian Pickles, c. 1600–1750." Cultural History 9(1):106–122. doi:10.3366/cult.2020.0211.
- Thierry, Anne; Baty, Céline; Marché, Laurent; Chuat, Victoria; Picard, Olivier; Lortal, Sylvie; and Valence, Florence. 2023. "Lactofermentation of Vegetables: An Ancient Method of Preservation Matching New Trends." Trends in Food Science & Technology 139:104112. doi:10.1016/j.tifs.2023.07.009.
- Banik, Avijit; Anjum, Hasnain; Habib, Humayra; Abony, Maruf; Begum, Anowara; and Ahmed, Zakaria. 2023. "Characterization of Lactic Acid Bacteria Isolated from Street Pickles of Dhaka, Bangladesh." Heliyon 9(6):e17508. doi:10.1016/j.heliyon.2023.e17508.
- Chakraborty, Rakhi, and Swarnendu Roy. 2018. "Exploration of the Diversity and Associated Health Benefits of Traditional Pickles from the Himalayan and Adjacent Hilly Regions of Indian Subcontinent." Journal of Food Science and Technology 55(5):1599–1613. doi:10.1007/s13197-018-3080-7.
- Achaya, K. T. 1998. A Historical Dictionary of Indian Food. Oxford University Press. https://archive.org/details/historicaldictio0000acha.
- Flachs, Andrew, and Joseph D. Orkin. 2021. "On Pickles: Biological and Sociocultural Links Between Fermented Foods and the Human Gut Microbiome." Journal of Ethnobiology and Ethnomedicine 17(1):39. doi:10.1186/s13002-021-00458-9.
- Behera, Sudhanshu S.; El Sheikha, Aly Farag; Hammami, Riadh; and Kumar, Awanish. 2020. "Traditionally Fermented Pickles: How the Microbial Diversity Associated with Their Nutritional and Health Benefits?" Journal of Functional Foods 70:103971. doi:10.1016/j.jff.2020.103971.
- Sahni, Julie. 1980. Classic Indian Cooking. William Morrow. https://archive.org/details/classicindiancoo00sahn.
