= Infinity chili =

Chili pepper known for extreme heat

Infinity chili pepper
- Species: Capsicum chinense
- Breeder: Nick Woods
- Origin: Grantham, Lincolnshire, England
- Heat: Exceptionally hot
- Scoville scale: 1,067,286 SHU

The Infinity Chili pepper is a chili pepper hybrid of the Capsicum chinense species created in England by chili breeder Nicholas Woods of Fire Foods, Grantham, Lincolnshire. For two weeks in February 2011, the Infinity Chili held the Guinness World Record title for the world's hottest chili with a Scoville scale rating of 1,067,286 Scoville Heat Units (SHU). On 1 March 2011 it was displaced by the Trinidad Scorpion Butch T pepper, which registered 1,463,700 SHU.

Woods created the Infinity Chili five years after he started growing chili peppers for his hot sauces. He was not attempting to breed a new variety, but was growing his peppers in a greenhouse where crossbreeding between varieties happens readily. He described first trying his new pepper as: "When I tried it tasted nice at first, like an odd fruity taste, the effect is delayed. Then it hit me. All of a sudden I felt it burning in the back of my throat, so hot that I couldn't speak. I began to shake uncontrollably, I had to sit down, I felt physically sick. I really wouldn't recommend anybody eat it raw like that."

The Bindi restaurant in Grantham served a curry, called "The Widower", made with 20 Infinity chilies, claiming to be the world's hottest curry. More than three hundred people tried the curry before Dr. Ian Rothwell became the first person to finish a dish, taking just over an hour, including a 10 minute walk where he was said to have been hallucinating. Rothwell attributed this to the endorphins from eating chilies.

== Testing ==
Testing of the chili's Scoville rating was carried out at the University of Warwick's Crop Centre during March 2010.

Both the tests for the Infinity Chili and the Naga Viper, also done at University of Warwick, were heavily criticized by respected pepper researchers; Dave DeWitt of The Chile Pepper Institute stated: "With one test, the most you can show is that a single pepper--or a part of a single pepper--had that heat rating. To establish that a variety of pepper is consistently the world's hottest, you need more than that." Even the researchers at the University of Warwick were surprised by both bestowals of world's hottest pepper as they had thought that another independent verification and proof of cultivar stability would be needed. As it is possible to vary the heat within a strain by stressing the plant through various techniques such as selectively withholding water and five years is not sufficient time to breed a new cultivar, and especially not to stabilize it, the researchers and growers rejected the claims of both the Infinity pepper and the Naga Viper in favor of the Trinidad Scorpion.

Since the controversy with the Infinity Chili and Naga Viper, both of which appear to have been stressed unstable hybrids measured at a peak, and with the increasing number of contenders for hottest chili pepper, Guinness World Records has required more verification of heat levels and of cultivar stabilization.

== See also ==
- Hottest chili pepper
