= Armageddon (pepper) =

Super Hot chili pepper

- Species: Landrace hybrid
- Hybrid parentage: Capsicum chinense × Capsicum frutescens
- Breeder: Salvatore Genovese
- Origin: UK
- Heat: Exceptionally hot
- Scoville scale: 1,300,000 SHU

The Armageddon chili pepper is a chili pepper variety of C. chinense. The variety was created by Tozer Seeds and first grown by Salvatore Genovese. The Armageddon pepper was introduced to the UK market in 2019. The pepper holds a rating of 1.3 million SHU (Scoville Heating Units).

== Development and distribution ==
Armageddon is a C. Chinense and one of the ‘Super Hot’ chilies, the fruity-flavored pepper was cultivated to be a quick growing, high yielding and easily harvested pepper, making it a leading candidate for the growing of 'Super Hots' at scale. In 2019, the first commercial grower of the Armageddon promoted it as "...the hottest commercially grown chili in the UK..." although the heat level was well below the then Guinness World Records individual pepper heat leaders, the Naga Viper, Trinidad Scorpion Butch T pepper, and the Carolina Reaper.

== Appearance and pungency ==
The Armageddon plant spreads to an average width of 1.5 feet, and grows to an average height of 2.5 feet. One plant will produce fruits up to 2" long, that require up to 75 days to reach maturity, much quicker than that of the Carolina Reaper. The Armageddon pepper has been classified as 'Exceptionally Hot', and is rated on the Scoville heat scale (Note: The Scoville scale measures the capsaicin content in a hot pepper.) at 1.3 million units, which is about 400 times hotter than the typical jalapeño pepper rating.

== See also ==
- Hottest chili pepper
