= Habanaga =

Chili pepper cultivar

Habanaga pepper
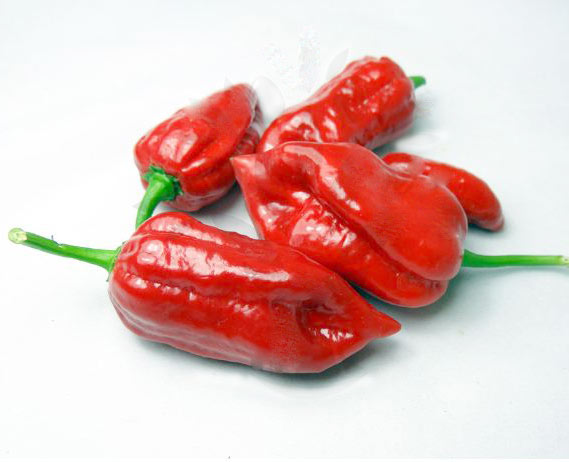

- Heat: Exceptionally hot
- Scoville scale: 500,000-800,000 SHU

The Habanaga is a cultivar of the chili pepper Capsicum chinense. This pepper was developed in New Mexico when a university student unintentionally crossed a Habanero and a Bhut Jolokia.

== Culinary use ==
Has a heat level of 800,000 Scoville Units. If the Habanaga is too hot for a dish, a Habanero pepper can be used as a substitute

Habanaga
Nutritional value per 100 g (3.5 oz)
- Carbohydrates: 4 g of carbohydrates.
- Protein: 1 g of protein
Vitamins and minerals
- ^{†}Percentages estimated using US recommendations for adults, except for potassium, which is estimated based on expert recommendation from the National Academies.

== See also ==
- List of Capsicum cultivars
- Capsicum
