= Dragon's Breath (chili pepper) =

Chili pepper

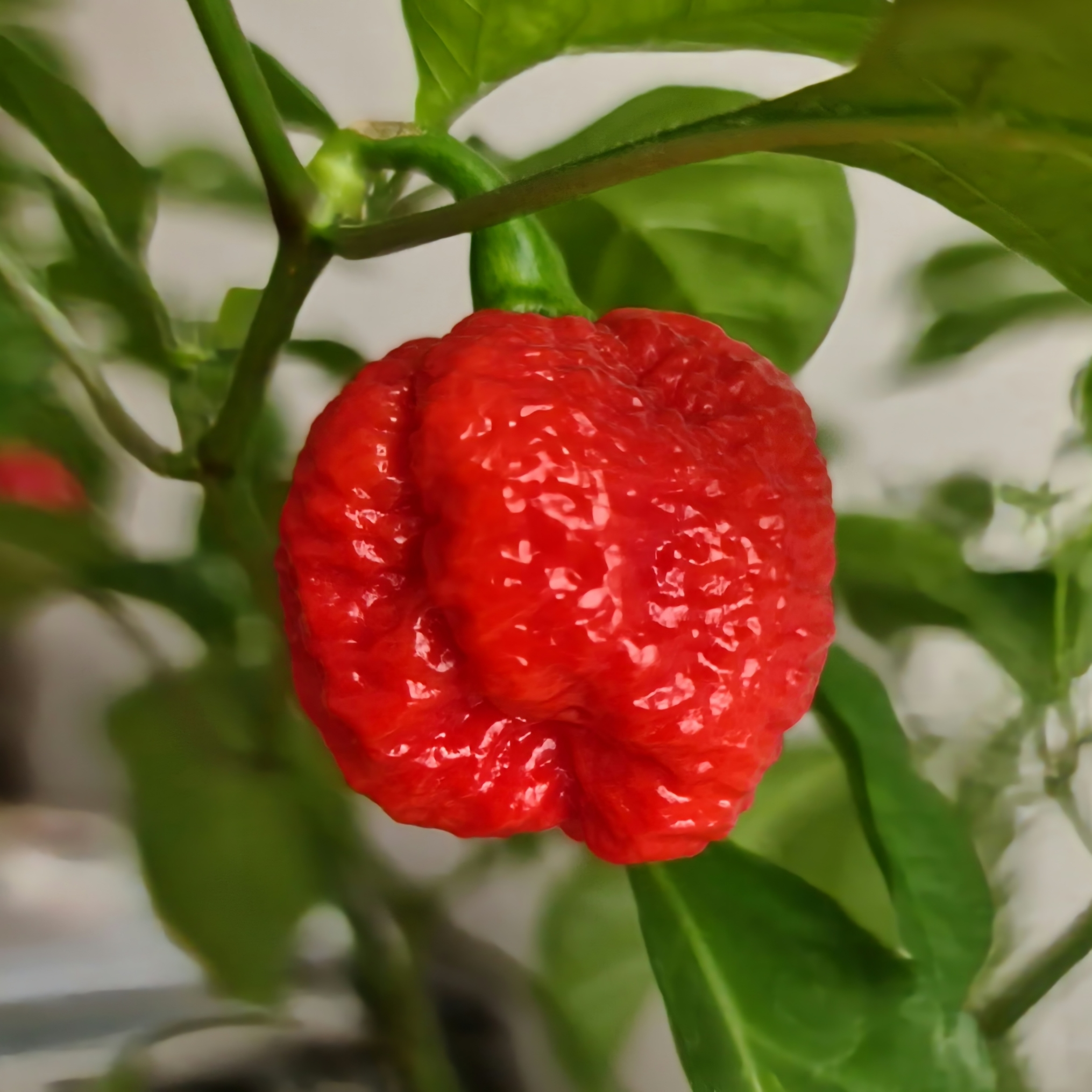
- Species: Capsicum chinense
- Breeder: Neal Price
- Origin: Denbighshire and Nottingham, United Kingdom
- Heat: Exceptionally hot
- Scoville scale: 2,480,000 SHU

Dragon's Breath is a chili pepper cultivar that unofficially tested at 2.48 million Scoville units.

== Development ==
The plant was developed in a collaboration between chili farmer Neal Price, NPK Technology, and Nottingham Trent University during a test of a special plant food and for its essential oil having potential as a skin anesthetic. The Dragon's Breath plant was later cultivated by breeder Mike Smith of St Asaph, Denbighshire, Wales, who said that he had not planned to breed the chili for record heat, but rather was trying to grow an attractive pepper plant. Due to the nationality of the farmer who cultivated the pepper in Wales, it was named Dragon's Breath after the Welsh dragon. It was entered in the Plant of the Year contest at the 2017 Chelsea Flower Show where it was on the short list, but did not place.

== Heat ==
The Dragon's Breath chili was unofficially tested at 2.48 million Scoville Heat Units (SHU), making it a contender for the hottest chili pepper in the world. As of October 2023, Guinness World Records has not recognized this claim, as the Carolina Reaper was still mentioned as the current record holder at the time the claim was made. It has since been surpassed by Pepper X, having been measured at 2.69 million SHU on August 23, 2023.

Nottingham Trent University researchers suggest that the pepper's ability to numb the skin could make its essential oil useful as an anaesthetic for patients who cannot tolerate other anaesthetics, or in countries where they are too expensive. Experts at the university warned that swallowing one might cause death by choking or anaphylactic shock; one science writer noted that this was a standard warning that applied only to those with relevant allergies.

== See also ==
- List of Capsicum cultivars
- Hottest chili pepper
