= Keygoes =

Portable chilli dispenser

Keygoes:chili keychain is a portable chilli dispenser designed to allow users to add chilli powder to their meals on the go. The product consists of a small, refillable container that attaches to a keychain, making it convenient for chilli enthusiasts to carry and use anytime.

== History ==
Keygoes was first introduced by George Svec in Slovakia in 2015 and since then it has gained popularity among spice lovers for its innovative design and practicality around the world. The concept originated from the idea of providing a portable solution for chilli lovers who want to add spice to their meals anywhere.

Keygoes was initially launched through Indiegogo campaign and quickly garnered attention for its unique use and design. Over the years, the product line has expanded to include various flavours of chilli powders and different casing materials.

== Design and features ==
Keygoes features a compact cylindrical design made from stainless steel, titanium, aluminum or plastic, which are both durable and lightweight.

The keychain attachment allows users to easily carry it with their keys, ensuring that they have access to chilli powder wherever they go. The dispenser is refillable, and Keygoes offers a variety of chilli powders, including their ULTRA version which has Trinidad Moruga Scorpion and Carolina Reaper chilli powder (both former Guinness record holders). Each unit is designed to be user-friendly, with a simple shaker mechanism to dispense the desired amount of chilli out of the interchangeable refill.

Aside from chili, the keychain manufacturer also offers keygoes:salty with different types of salts, keygoes:stevia and keygoes:coffee with special cocoa-cinnamon powder.

== Reception and impact ==
Since its launch, Keygoes has received positive reviews from both consumers and industry experts. It has been featured in several culinary magazines and food blogs for its innovative design. The product has also been praised for its environmental sustainability due to its refillable nature.

== Marketing and distribution ==
Keygoes has been marketed primarily through online platforms, including its official website and major e-commerce retailers like Amazon. The brand has also used social media marketing to reach global audience, often collaborating with food influencers and chefs to showcase its versatility. In addition to online sales, Keygoes is available in selected physical stores in Europe.

== See also ==
- Chili pepper
- Keychain
