= Hunan hand syndrome =

- Other names: Chili burn
- Specialty: Dermatology
- Causes: Exposure to capsaicin from improper handling of chili peppers, higher risk from high concentrations of capsaicin
- Prevention: Wearing rubber gloves when preparing or handling chili peppers, especially for superhot chilis

Hunan hand syndrome (also known as "chili burn") is a temporary, but very painful, cutaneous condition that commonly afflicts those who handle, prepare, or cook with fresh or roasted chili peppers. It was first described in an eponymous case report in The New England Journal of Medicine in 1981.

It occurs when the phytochemical capsaicin, which can be present in very high concentrations in certain varieties of chili peppers (especially with superhot peppers such as ghost peppers or Carolina reapers), contacts cutaneous free nerve endings which are present in high density in finger tips. This triggers the release of substance P, which in turn causes a sensation of intense burning pain. Various treatments for Hunan Hand have been described, including soaking the affected fingers in lidocaine; milk or vinegar; or the use of local nerve blocks, gabapentin, or topical corticosteroids. Hunan hand can be prevented by wearing rubber gloves when handling chili peppers.

== See also ==
- Kang cancer
- List of skin conditions
