= Trinidad scorpion =

Trinidad Scorpion may refer to:

- Trinidad Moruga scorpion, an "exceptionally hot" chili pepper currently ranked as the second-spiciest in the world
- Trinidad Scorpion Butch T pepper, chili that was recognized as the world's hottest pepper by Guinness World Records from 2011 to 2013
- Trinidad Scorpion Hallucinations, a 2016 album by Jeff Hughell
