= Ed Currie =

American grower of chili peppers

- Born: August 18, 1963 (age 63); West Bloomfield Township, Michigan, US
- Other name: Smokin' Ed Currie
- Education: Central Michigan University
- Years active: 2001–present
- Known for: Breeding chili peppers including Carolina Reapers and Pepper X
- Title: Founder of PuckerButt Pepper Company
- Spouse: Linda

Ed Currie (born August 18, 1963) is an American chili pepper breeder who is the founder and president of the PuckerButt Pepper Company. He is best known for breeding two of the hottest chili peppers in the world as recognized by Guinness World Records: the Carolina Reaper and Pepper X.

== Background ==
Currie was born in West Bloomfield Township, Michigan and grew up in Metro Detroit. He graduated from Central Michigan University and subsequently became a stockbroker. His first day of work after qualifying was Black Monday, when global markets collapsed.

Having struggled with substance abuse as a "functional addict", in 1999 Currie contemplated suicide but instead went to rehab. He met his wife, Linda, at recovery meetings after moving to South Carolina in 2001 to be closer to family. Here he began growing his own peppers in the yard and experimenting with crossbreeds.

He was featured in the episode "Chili Eating" in the 2020 Netflix documentary series We Are the Champions. He was also featured on Dirty Jobs.

== PuckerButt Pepper Company ==
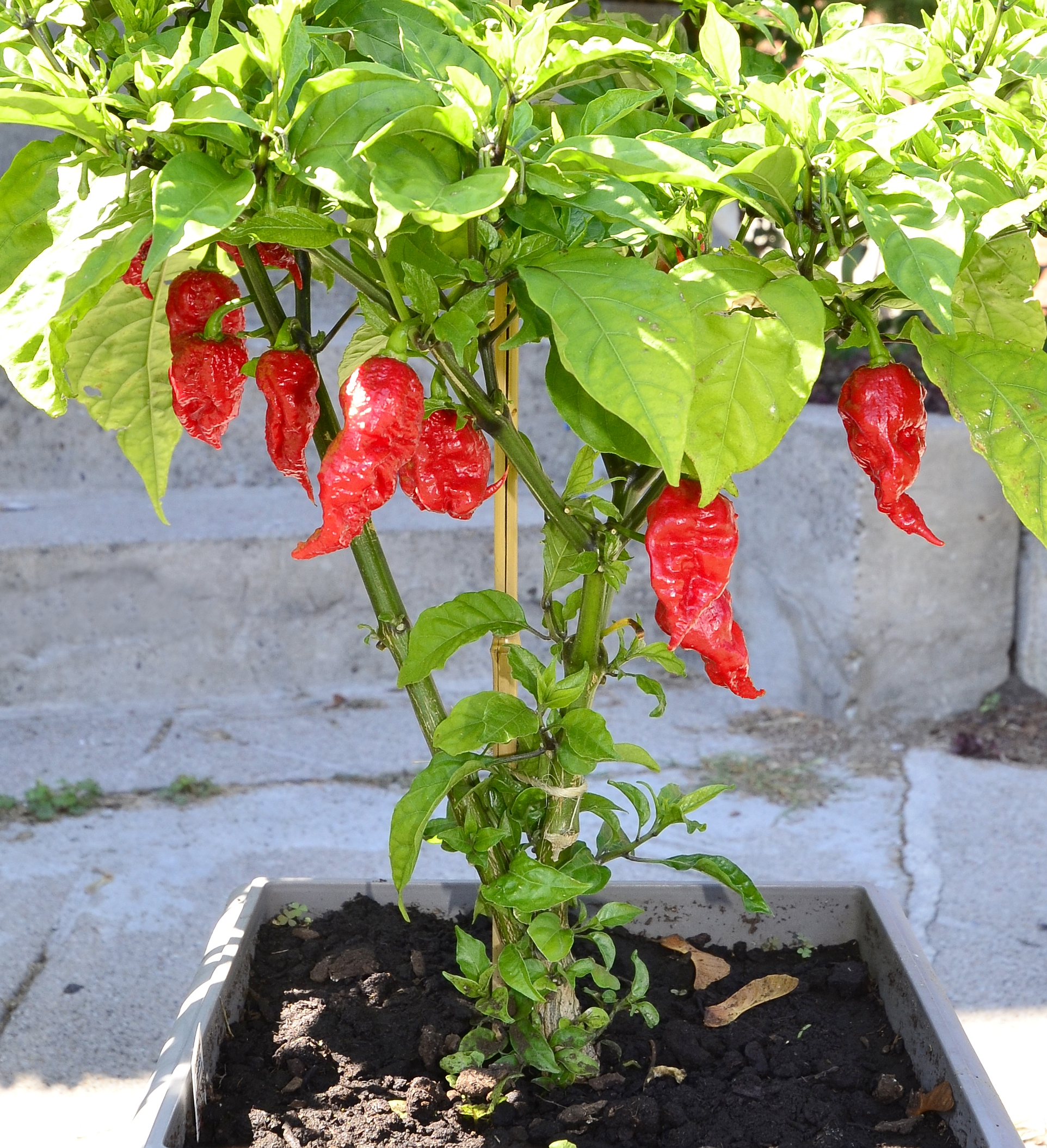
Ed Currie bred the Carolina Reaper (shown above) and Pepper X, both world-record holding chili peppers at different points.

Currie started the PuckerButt Pepper Company in Fort Mill, South Carolina, in 2003. The company sells peppers considered to be extremely hot. It sells seeds, pepper mash, and hot sauce. PuckerButt is the largest organic pepper farm in the US, with annual sales of around $1 million. Currie's hot sauce "The Last Dab" was created for the YouTube show Hot Ones. The show is an interview which asks guests to eat increasingly spicy hot wings, with "The Last Dab" being the spiciest sauce presented.

Currie crossbreeds his pepper plants by taking the pollen of one plant with a paintbrush and then delivering that pollen to a different plant. To create the Carolina Reaper, he took a Naga pepper, a chili pepper originally grown in India and Bangladesh, and combined it with the La Soufriere pepper from Saint Vincent. In 2013, Guinness World Records gave the title of "World's Hottest Chili" to the Carolina Reaper. On August 23, 2023, he was officially recognized as having broken the previous record when Guinness World Records certified his Pepper X as the hottest chili pepper on Earth, measuring at 2.69 million SHU.

There is some controversy regarding whether or not Pepper X is truly as hot as reported, given alleged defects in the study used by Guinness, as well as Currie's refusal to allow other independent testing.
