= Fatalii =

Chilli pepper cultivar

Fatalii chilli
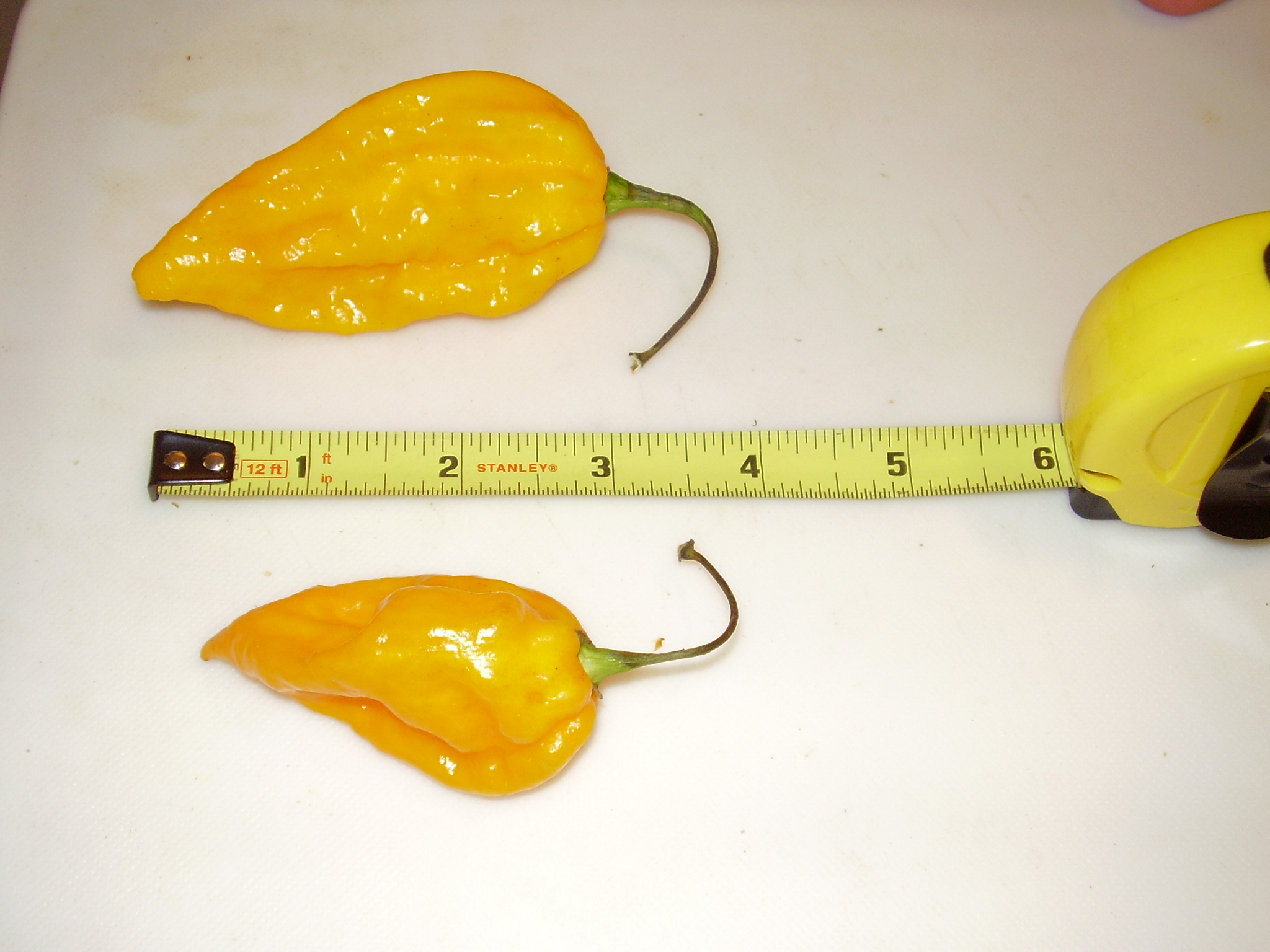
- Two ripe Fatalii chillies, with tape measure (in inches) for scale.
- Species: Capsicum chinense
- Cultivar: 'Fatalii'
- Origin: Africa
- Heat: Very hot
- Scoville scale: 125,000–400,000 SHU

The Fatalii is a cultivar of the chilli pepper Capsicum chinense developed in southern or central Africa from chilies introduced from the Americas. It is described as having a fruity, citrus flavor with a searing heat comparable to the habanero, to which it is related and from which it may have derived.

== History ==
Originally from the Americas, like all chilli species, the specific variety known as Fatalii was 'discovered' and is thought to have developed in Central Africa. Since commerce between the Americas and Africa has spanned some four centuries or more, this is uncontroversial.

== Cultivation ==
The plants typically grow 20 to 25 inches (51–64 cm) in height, but may reach 3 feet (0.91 m) or taller under optimal growing conditions, and plant distance should be about the same. The pendant pods get 2.5 to 3.5 inches (6.4–8.9 cm) long and about 0.75 to 1.5 inches (1.9–3.8 cm) wide. From a pale green, the most common variety matures to a bright yellow. Less common are red, chocolate and white Fataliis. The red version of Fatalii apparently has a somewhat different flavor and shorter, wider pods, maturing from medium green to dark red but the strain is unstable, throwing yellow and orange fruit. The white Fatalii tastes very like the standard yellow version, but lighter and more citrusy, and has similar heat, perhaps a fraction less.

== Raw chili taste ==
When eating a whole white chili and chewing for at least 10 seconds before swallowing (not recommended for untrained tasters) the heat may be first felt aggressively in the back of the throat, up the nose, then eventually moves to the roof of the mouth and finally the tongue where the pain is intense, at which point there can be gustatory sweating and tears from the eyes. Some tasters note the strong, fruity Fatalii flavour, which is quite distinct, as being almost identical to the yellow version. Others find it milder.

== Culinary use ==
The Fatalii is known for its extreme heat and citrus flavor. It can be made into a hot sauce with other citrus flavors, including lime and lemon. The heat can be reduced (extended) with oil and nuts. Variations of Fatalii hot sauces often include fruits including pineapple and mango. It can be used fresh diced to add heat and spice to marinades, dressings, barbeque sauces, salsa, and chutney. The Fatalii can be combined with fruit to make jelly and jam. Being thin-walled it is an ideal pepper for drying. It is reported to add a fruity flavor and spice when brewing beer.

== See also ==
- List of Capsicum cultivars
- Capsicum chinense
- Capsicum
