= Naga Viper pepper =

Hot chili pepper

Naga Viper
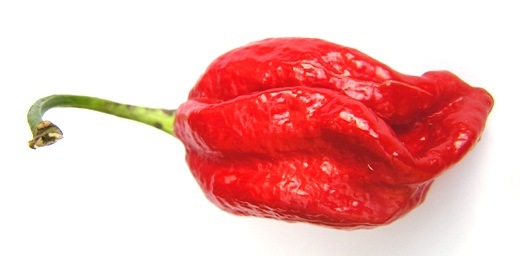
- Breeder: Gerald Fowler
- Origin: Cumbria, England
- Heat: Exceptionally hot
- Scoville scale: 1,382,118 SHU

The Naga Viper pepper is a hot chili pepper developed in England. In 2011, it was recorded as the "World's Hottest Chili" by the Guinness World Records with a rating of 1,382,118 Scoville heat units (SHU), but was surpassed in SHU by the Carolina Reaper, in 2017, and again by the latest world record holder Pepper X in 2023.

== Origin ==
The Naga Viper was created in England by chilli farmer Gerald Fowler of the Chilli Pepper Company in Cark, Cumbria. It is claimed to be an unstable three-way hybrid produced from the Naga Morich, the Bhut jolokia and the Trinidad scorpion, which are some of the world's hottest peppers.

== See also ==
- Hottest chili pepper
