= Hottest chili pepper =

Informal pepper competition

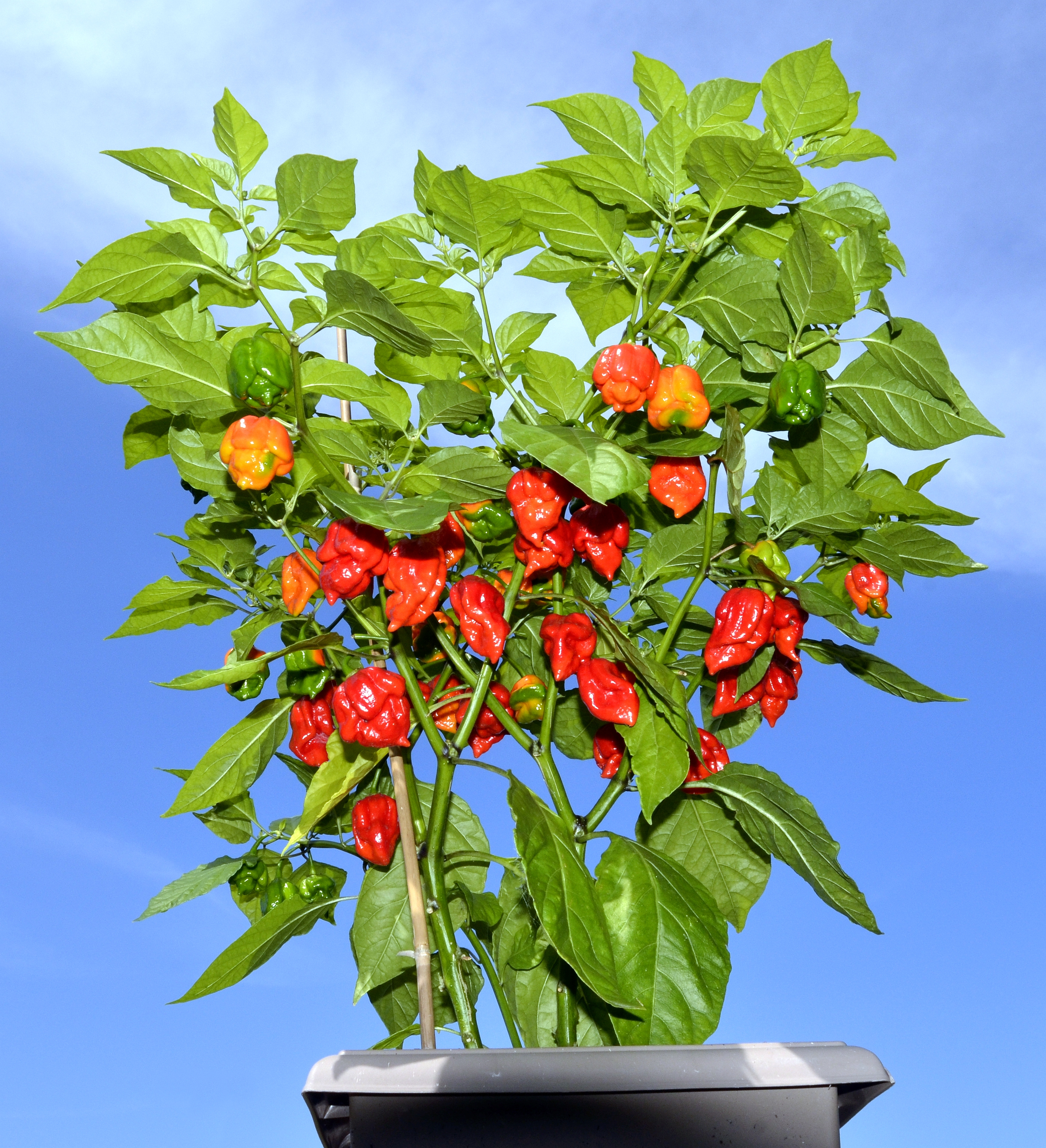
Mature Carolina Reaper, listed by Guinness as the hottest chili pepper from 2017 to 2023

Among growers in the US, the UK, and Australia, there has been a competition since the 1990s to grow the hottest chili pepper. Chili pepper species and cultivars registering over 1,000,000 Scoville Heat units (SHU) are called "super-hots". Past Guinness World Record holders (in increasing order of hotness) include the Infinity chili, Trinidad Moruga scorpion, Naga Viper pepper, Trinidad Scorpion Butch T, and Carolina Reaper. The current record holder, declared in 2023, is Pepper X, at more than 2.69 million SHU.

== History ==
Before the early 1990s, there were only two peppers which had been measured above 350,000 SHU, the Scotch bonnet and the habanero. California farmer Frank Garcia used a sport of a habanero to develop a new cultivar, the Red Savina (C. chinense), which was measured at 570,000 in 1994. At the time, this was considered representative of an upper limit of chili pepper hotness.

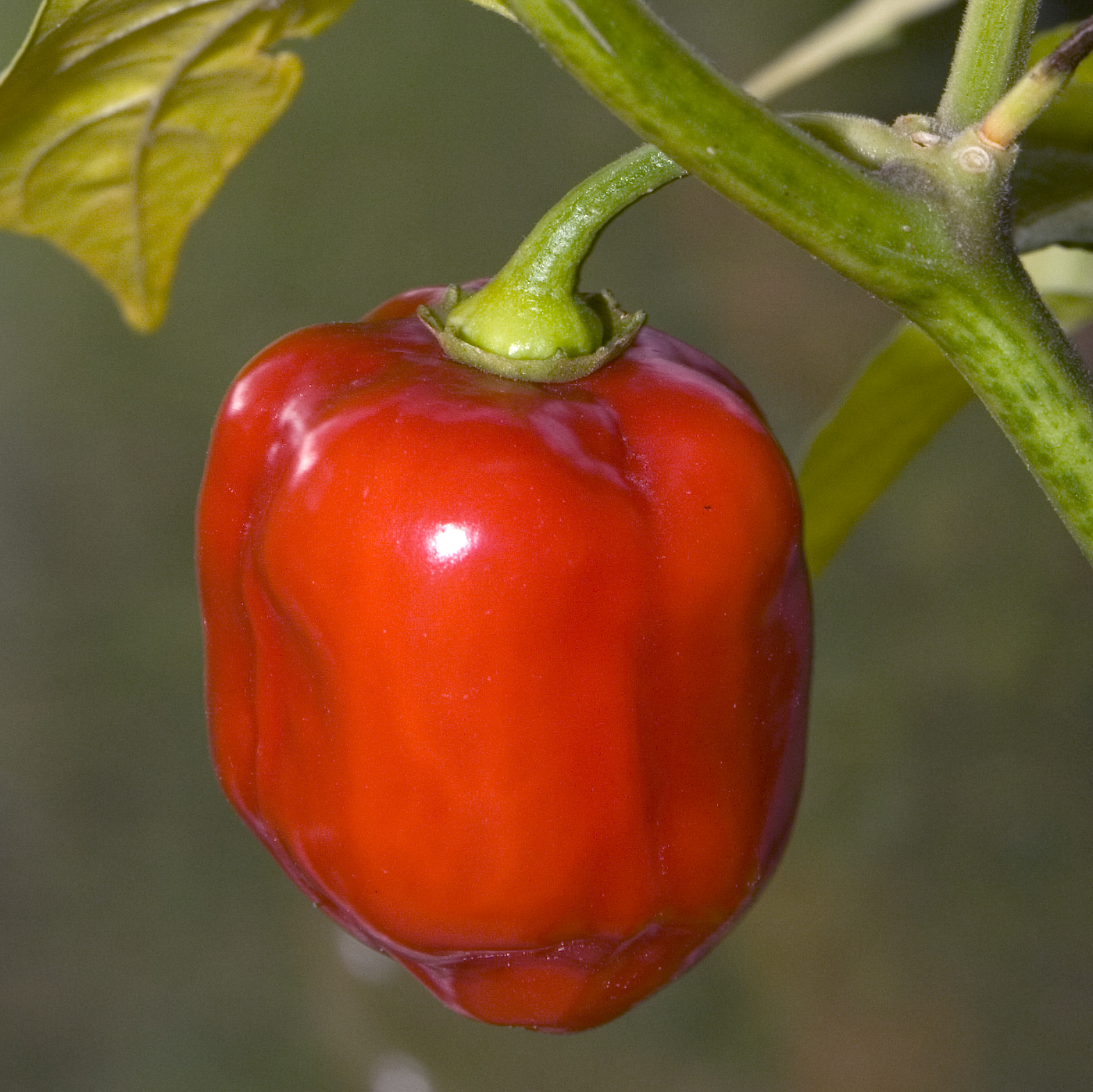
The Red Savina pepper

In 2001, Paul Bosland, a researcher at the Chile Pepper Institute at New Mexico State University, visited India to collect specimens of ghost pepper, also called the Bhut Jolokia or Naga king chili, traditionally grown near Assam, India, which was being studied by the Indian army for weaponization. When Bosland grew and tested the pepper, he discovered it measured over 1 million SHU. According to Bosland, this "kind of opened the floodgates". In 2006, the Dorset Naga was claimed to be the hottest, with the BBC measuring a single fruit at 1.6 million in a chilli trial in 2006. In 2012, the Chili Pepper Institute called the Trinidad Moruga scorpion the new hottest pepper, saying it had been measured at 2 million SHU, the first time the 2-million mark had been reached.

Many of the cultivars developed in the attempt to produce ever-hotter peppers are hybrids of chilies traditionally grown in India and Trinidad.

=== Super-hots ===
The new peppers have been termed "super-hots". Super-hots are classified as peppers registering over 1 million SHU.

In 2015, Bosland and his team, using fluorescence microscopy, found that super-hots not only have more capsaicin than other peppers, but also store their capsaicin differently. While for most peppers removing the pith and seeds also removes much of the heat, for super-hots this is not true, as they tend to store as much in their flesh as they do in their pith. In their report, Bosland et al. call it a "novel discovery that these 'super-hot' chili peppers have developed accessorial vesicles on the pericarp tissue in addition to the vesicles on the placental tissue, thus leading to exceedingly high Scoville heat units for these plants."

Super-hots should be handled with gloves and using eye protection, as contact with even a single seed can cause skin irritation via chili burn.

== Competition and certification ==
Chili growers compete with one another, often "ruthlessly", to create the world's hottest pepper. According to Marc Fennell, creator of podcast It Burns, the competition is "a hugely controversial war – there are scandals, accusations of cheating, death threats." According to Maxim, the race has "ignited heated debate" among chiliheads and raised "deep questions about science, ethics, and honor." While competition mainly takes place among British, Australian, and American growers the competition in the US is noted for its "negativity and fighting."

For many chili growers, the "crowning achievement" is being listed in Guinness World Records. Guinness named a new hottest pepper in 2023, recognizing the Pepper X with 2.69 million Scoville units.

== Impact ==
According to Bosland, the records are "mainly of interest as publicity for purveyors of sauces". As of 2013, hot sauce production and sales were among the fastest growing industries in the US, worth an estimated US$1 billion, and producers "sell more sauce with a world-famous chile on the label". Being able to claim the record can "make or break a new product". The developer of the Naga Viper pepper, which claimed the record for a short period in 2011, earned US$40,000 in one month from sales of seeds and sauces. The developer of the Trinidad Moruga scorpion, which claimed the record in 2012, made US$10,000 in two days selling seeds.

Seed sales are also an important revenue stream for developers. As of 2013, super-hot seeds were unavailable from commercial seed suppliers, so those wishing to grow the peppers could obtain them only from the developers or small specialty suppliers. According to Dave DeWitt, in 2013 "a typical Scorpion pepper pod at a farmers’ market [would] go for one dollar", speculating that "behind marijuana, they have the potential to become the second- or third-highest yielding crop per acre monetarily". A bottle of hot sauce claimed to have 16 million SHU sold for US$595. Chiliheads make YouTube videos showing themselves eating super-hots as a means of providing entertainment or marketing the heat of a particular pepper.

In Nagaland, India, the annual Hornbill Festival includes a ghost pepper-eating competition.

== Hottest peppers ==
=== Certified super-hot record holders ===
Between 2007 and 2012, Guinness "fielded 25 different claims to world's hottest". As of August 23, 2023, Guinness lists Pepper X as the hottest pepper.

Cultivar	Image	Capsicum species	Developer	Country	Scoville units	Guinness
Pepper X		C. chinense	Ed Currie	US	2,693,000	2023
Carolina Reaper		C. chinense	Ed Currie	US	1,569,300	2013
Trinidad Scorpion Butch T		C. chinense	Butch Taylor; Marcel de Wit	US; Australia	1,463,700	2011
Naga Viper		C. chinense × C. frutescens	Gerald Fowler	UK	1,382,000	2011
Trinidad Moruga scorpion		C. chinense	Wahid Ogeer	Trinidad	1,200,000	2012
Infinity		C. chinense	Nick Woods	UK	1,176,182	2011
Ghost pepper		C. chinense × C. frutescens	Landrace	India	1,001,000	2007

=== Uncertified contenders ===
Cultivar	Image	Capsicum species	Developer	Country	Alleged SHU	Introduced
Dragon's Breath		C. chinense	Neal Price	UK	2,400,000	2017
Chocolate 7-pot		C. chinense	Landrace	Trinidad	1,800,000	
Komodo Dragon		C. chinense	Landrace	UK	1,400,000	2015
Armageddon		C. chinense × C. frutescens	Landrace	UK	1,300,000	2019
Dorset Naga		C. chinense	Joy and Michael Michaud	UK	1,201,0001,600,000	2006
Naga Morich		C. chinense	Landrace	India and Bangladesh	1,000,000	
