= Ghost pepper =

Chili pepper cultivated in Northeast India

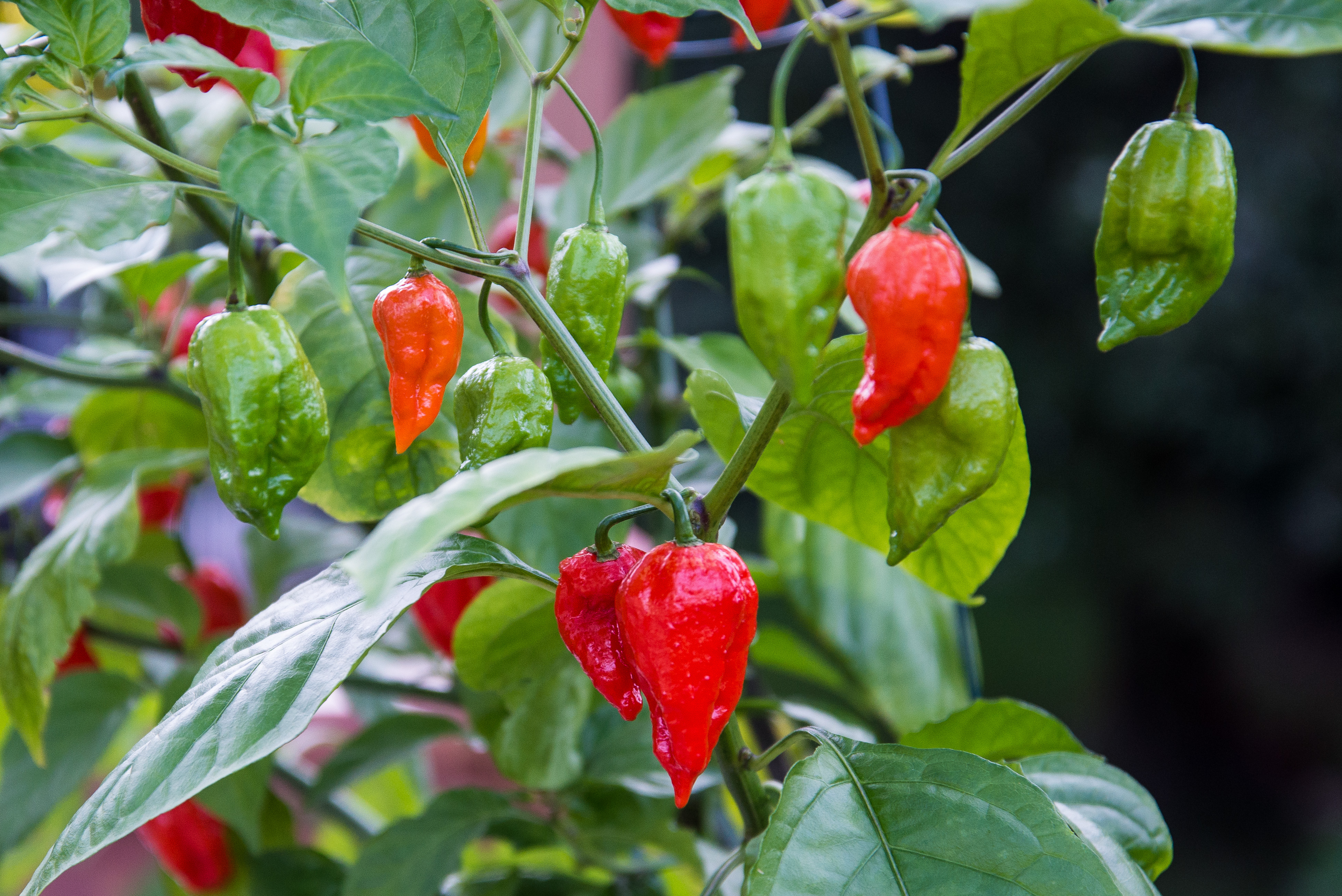
- Red (ripe) and green ghost pepper fruits
- Species: Capsicum chinense
- Origin: Northeast India (especially in Assam, Manipur and Nagaland)
- Heat: Exceptionally hot
- Scoville scale: 855,000 - 1,040,000 SHU

The ghost pepper, also known as bhut jolokia (lit. 'Bhutanese pepper' or 'ghost pepper' in Assamese) or naga jolokia, is a superhot chili pepper cultivated in Northeast India. In 2007, Guinness World Records certified that the ghost pepper was the world's hottest chili pepper, 170 times hotter than Tabasco sauce. The ghost chili is rated at more than one million Scoville Heat Units (SHUs) and far surpasses the amount of a habanero. However, the ghost chili has since been superseded by the Trinidad Scorpion Butch T pepper in 2011, the Carolina Reaper in 2013 and Pepper X in 2023.

Ghost pepper belongs to the species Capsicum chinense, but RAPD analysis indicates the presence of some genetic material from Capsicum frutescens from an introgression event; however, there is no indication that this is related to its exceptional heat.

== Etymology and regional names ==
The name bhut jolokia means 'Bhutanese pepper' in Assamese; the first element bhut /bʱʊt/, meaning 'Bhutanese', was mistakenly confused for a near-homonym bhut /bʱut/, meaning 'ghost'.

In Assam, the pepper is also known as bih zôlôkia meaning 'poison chili', from Assamese bih meaning 'poison' and zôlôkia meaning 'chili pepper', denoting the plant's heat. Similarly, in Nagaland, one of the regions of cultivation, the chili is called Raja mirja meaning King chili ('Naga king chili'; also romanized nôga zôlôkia) and bhut jolokia (also romanized bhût zôlôkiya). This name is especially common in other regions where it is grown, such as Assam and Manipur. It has also been called the Tezpur chili after the Assamese city of Tezpur. In Manipur, the chili is called umorok. In Northeast India, bhut jolokia is also known as the "king chili" or "king cobra chilli'". Other usages on the subcontinent are naga jolokia, 'Indian mystery chili' and 'Indian rough chili'.

== Scoville rating ==
In 2000, India's Defence Research Laboratory (DRL) reported a Scoville rating for the ghost pepper of 855,000 SHUs, and in 2004 a rating of 1,041,427 SHUs was made using HPLC analysis. For comparison, Tabasco red pepper sauce rates at 2,500–5,000, and pure capsaicin (the chemical responsible for the pungency of pepper plants) rates at 16,000,000 SHUs. In 2005, New Mexico State University's Chile Pepper Institute in Las Cruces, New Mexico, found ghost peppers grown from seed in southern New Mexico to have a Scoville rating of 1,001,304 SHUs by HPLC. Unlike most peppers, ghost peppers produce capsaicin in vesicles not only in the placenta around the seeds but also throughout the fruit.

== Characteristics ==
Ripe peppers measure 60 to 85 mm (2.4 to 3.3 in) in length and 25 to 30 mm (1.0 to 1.2 in) in width with a red, yellow, orange, or chocolate color. The unselected strain of ghost peppers from India is an extremely variable plant, with a wide range in fruit sizes and fruit production per plant. Ghost pepper pods are unique among peppers because of their characteristic shape and very thin skin. However, the red fruit variety has two different types: the rough, dented fruit and the smooth fruit. The rough fruit plants are taller, with more fragile branches, while the smooth fruit plants yield more fruit and are compact with sturdier branches. It takes about 7–12 days to germinate at 32–38 °C.

Plant height	45–120 cm (17–47 inches)
Stem color	Green
Leaf color	Green
Leaf length	10.65–14.25 cm
Leaf width	5.4–7.5 cm
Pedicels per axil	2
Corolla color	Yellow green
Anther color	Pale blue
Annular constriction	Present below calyx
Fruit color at maturity	Red is the most common, with orange, yellow and chocolate as rarer varieties

Fruit shape	Subconical to conical
Fruit length	5.95–8.54 cm
Fruit width at shoulder	2.5–2.95 cm
Fruit weight	6.95–8.97 g
Fruit surface	Rough, uneven or smooth
Seed color	Light tan
1000 seed weight	4.1–5.2 g
Seeds per fruit	19–35
Hypocotyl color	Green
Cotyledonous leaf shape	Deltoid

== Uses ==
=== Culinary ===
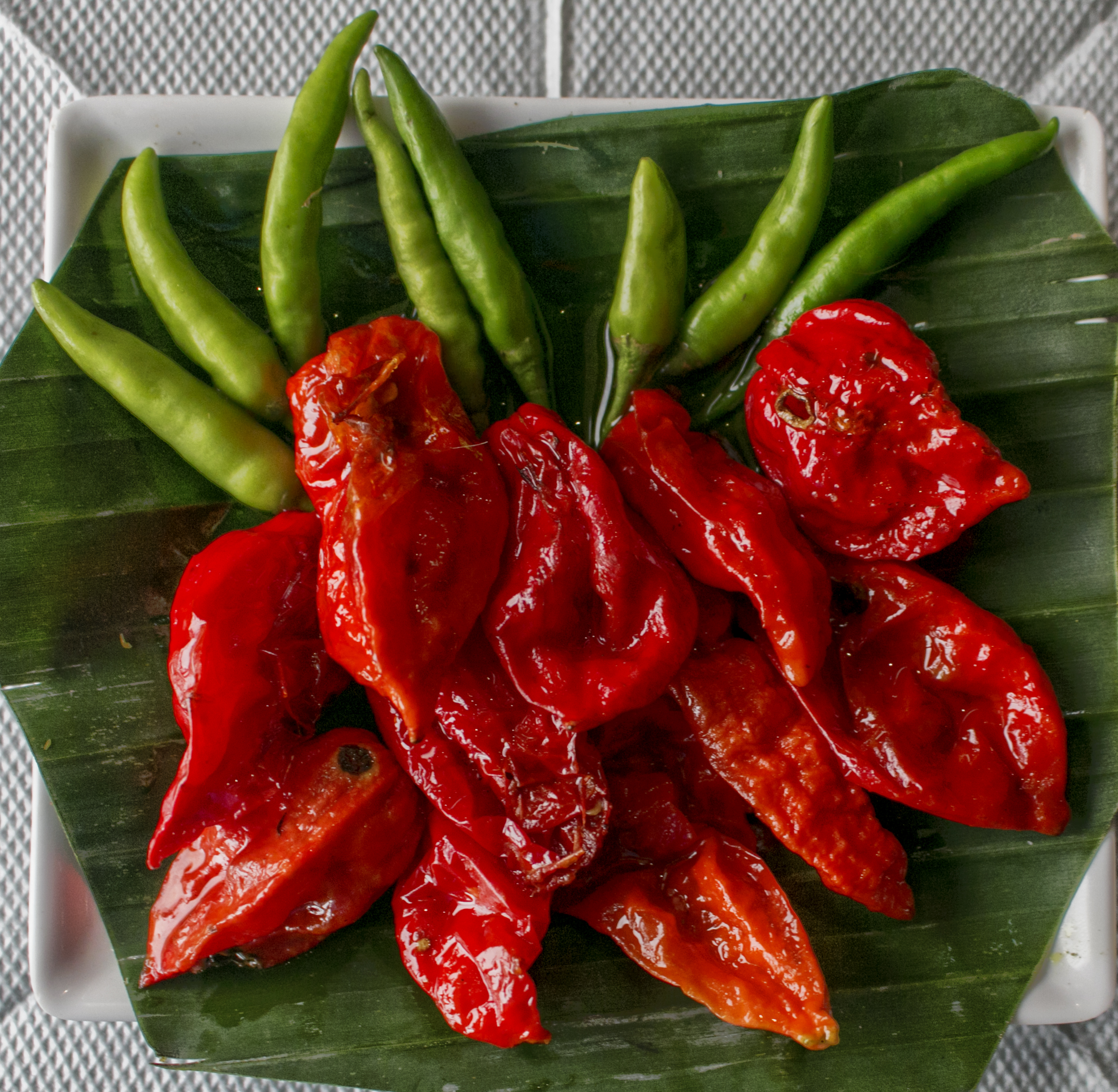
The ghost pepper

Ghost peppers are used as a food and a spice. It is used in both fresh and dried forms to heat up curries, pickles and chutneys. It is popularly used in combination with pork or dried or fermented fish. The pepper's intense heat makes it a fixture in competitive chili pepper eating.

=== Animal control ===
In northeastern India, the peppers are smeared on fences or incorporated in smoke bombs as a safety precaution to keep wild elephants at a distance.

=== Chili grenades ===
In 2009, scientists at India's Defence Research and Development Organisation (DRDO) announced plans to use the peppers in hand grenades as a nonlethal method to control rioters with pepper sprays or in self-defence. The DRDO said that ghost pepper-based aerosol sprays could be used as a "safety device", and "civil variants" of chili grenades could be used to control and disperse mobs. Chili grenades made from ghost peppers were successfully used by the Indian Army in August 2015 to flush out a terrorist hiding in a cave.

== Gallery ==
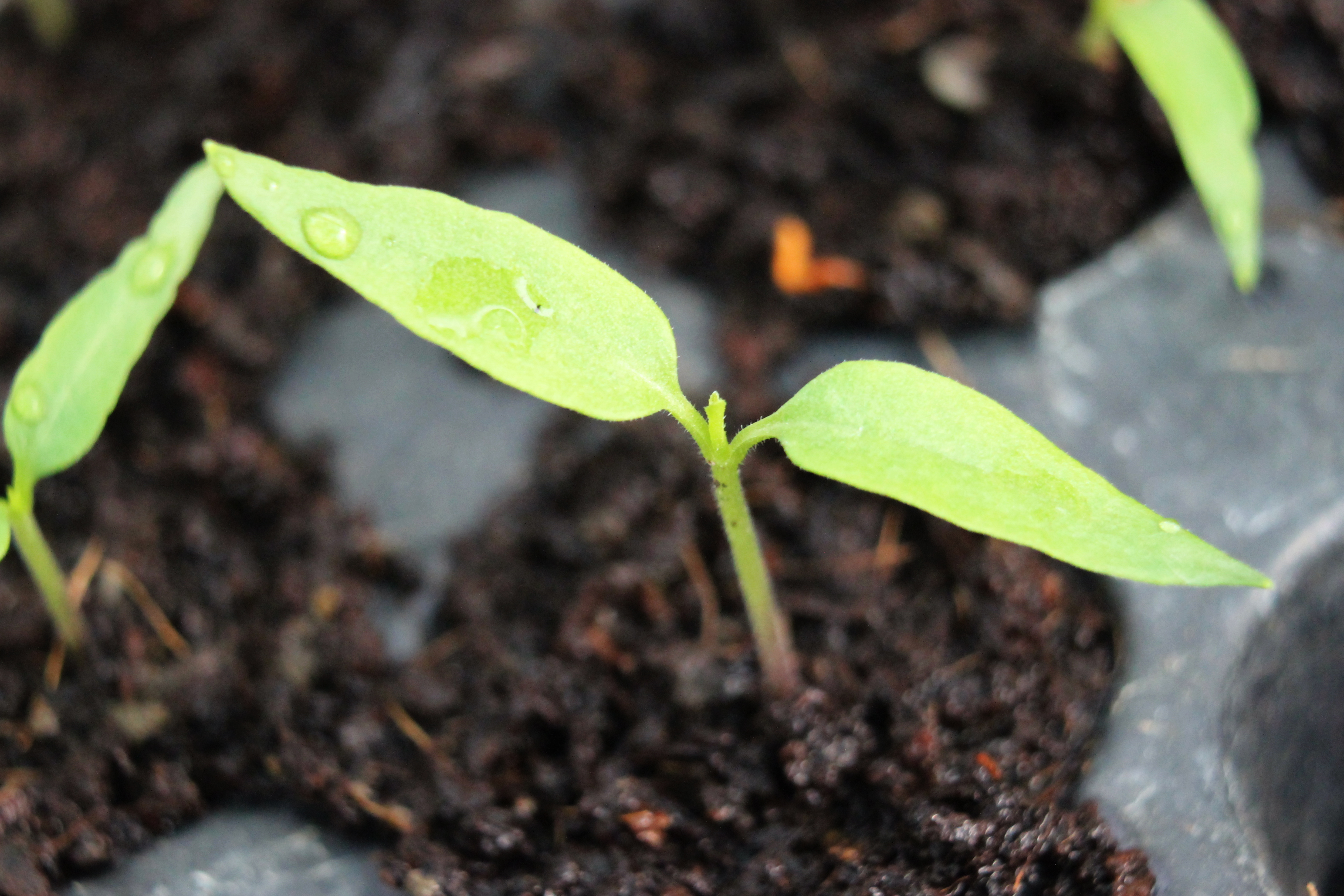
Ghost pepper leaf, about 10-day-old plant

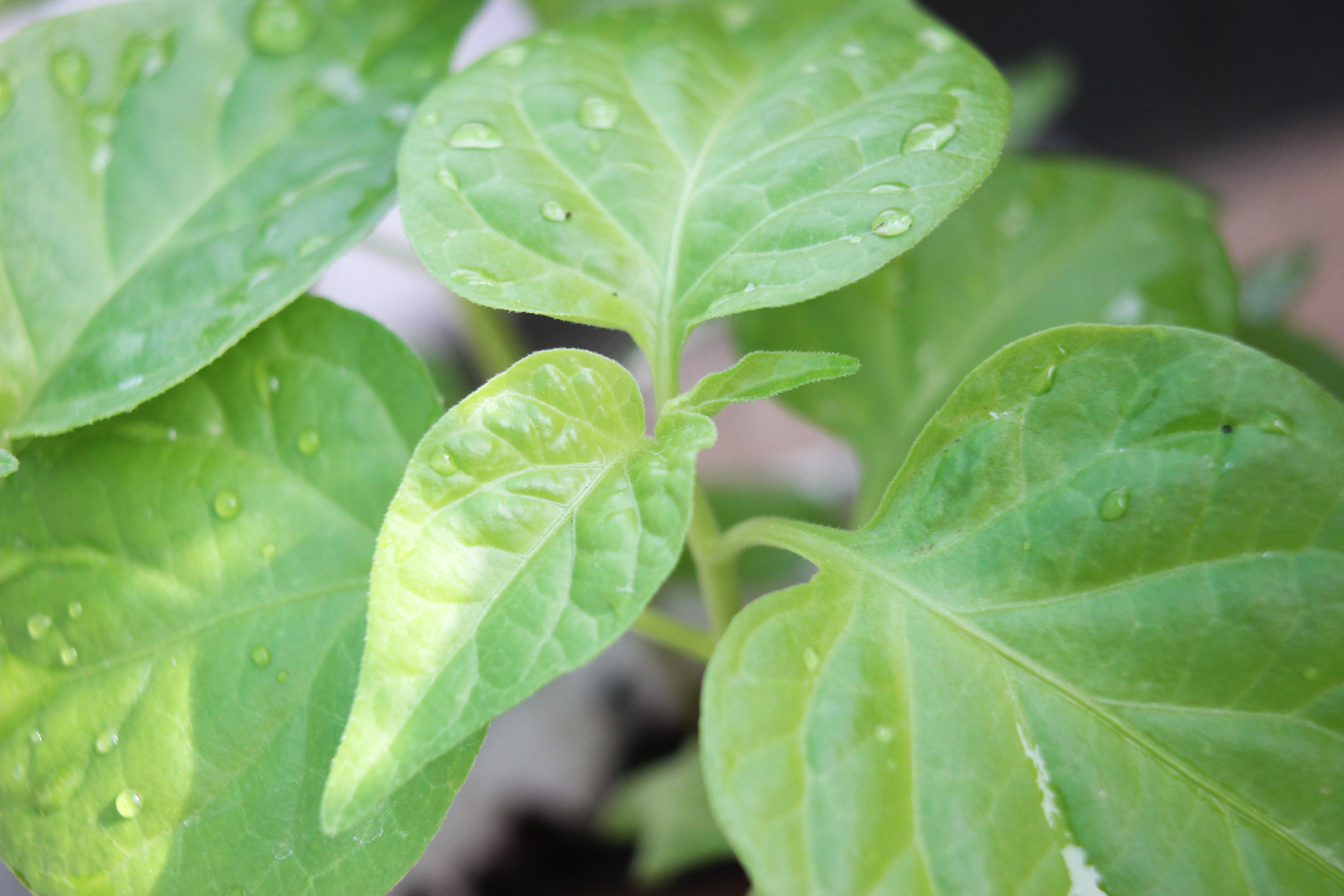
Ghost pepper leaf, about 30-day-old plant

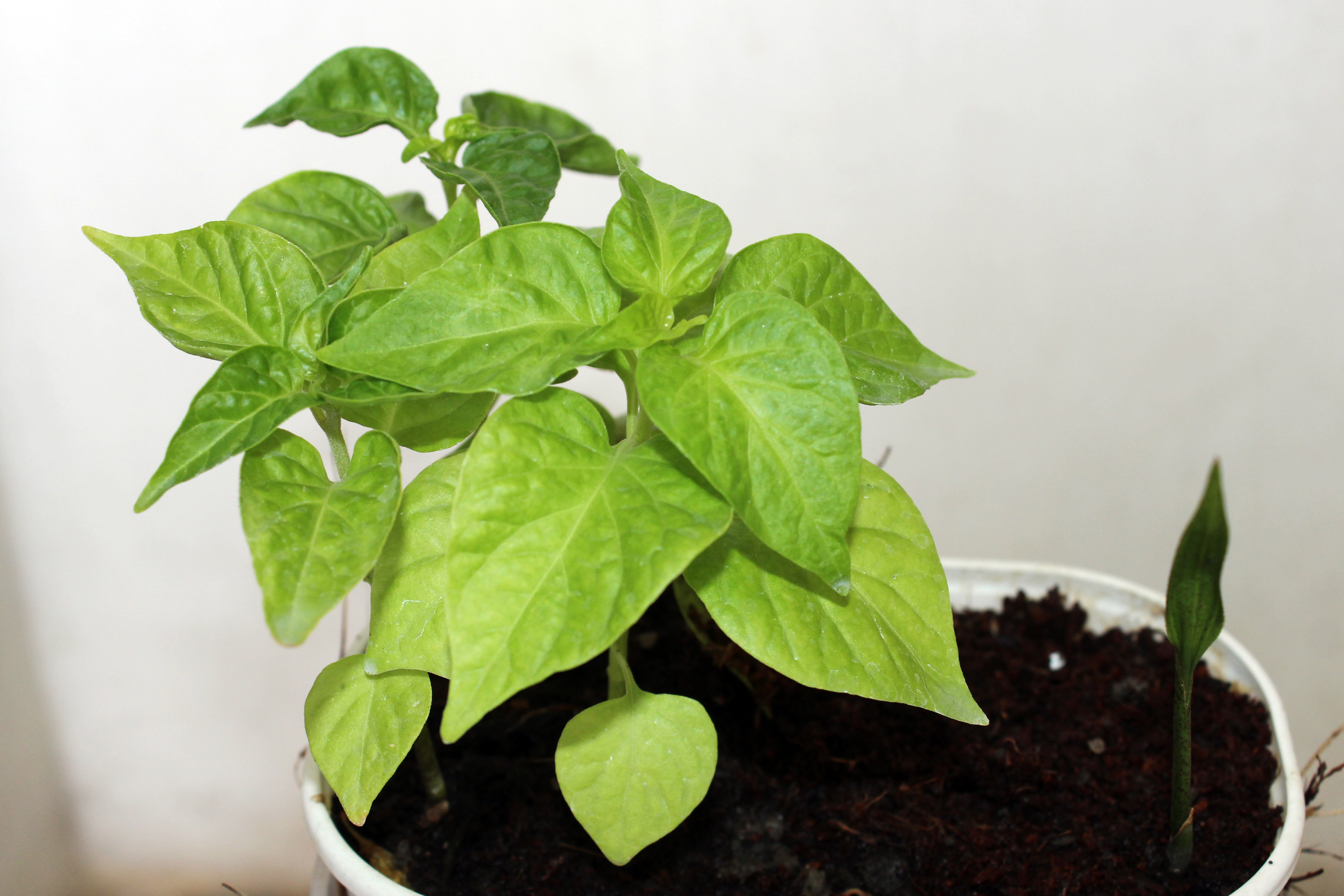
Ghost pepper plant, 40 days old, grown in coco peat

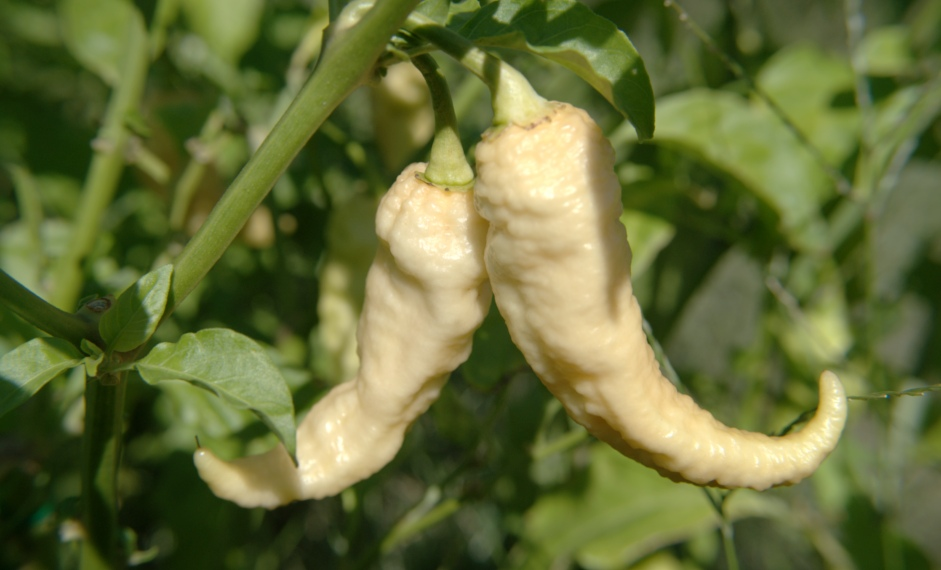
Peach ghost pepper

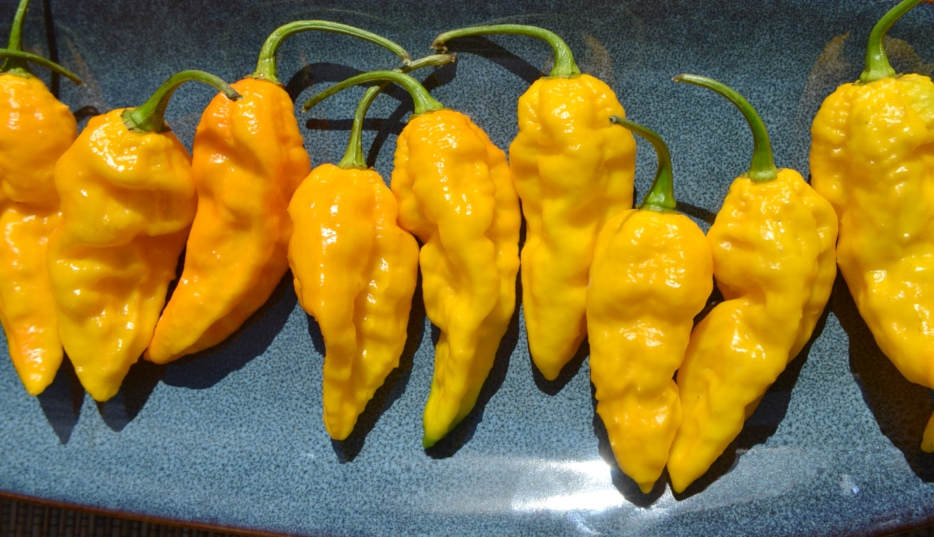
Yellow ghost pepper

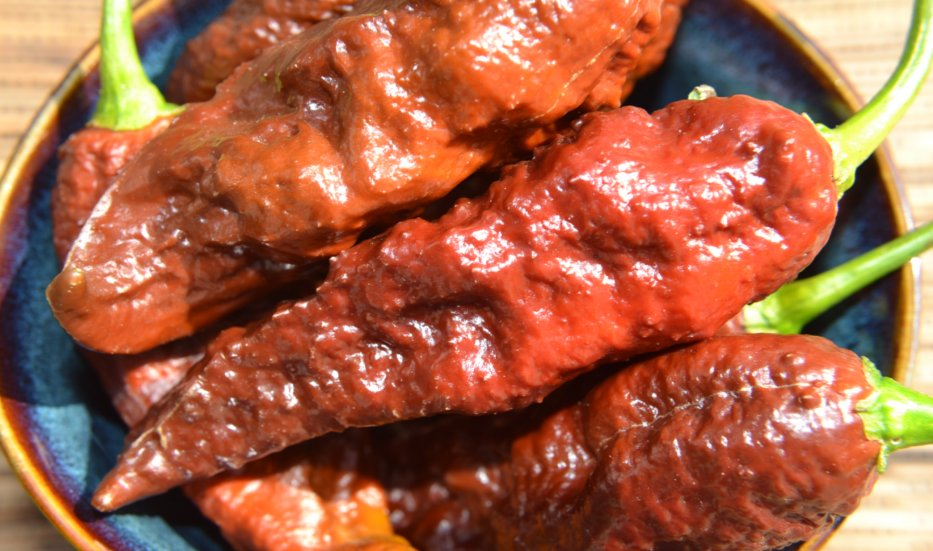
Chocolate ghost pepper

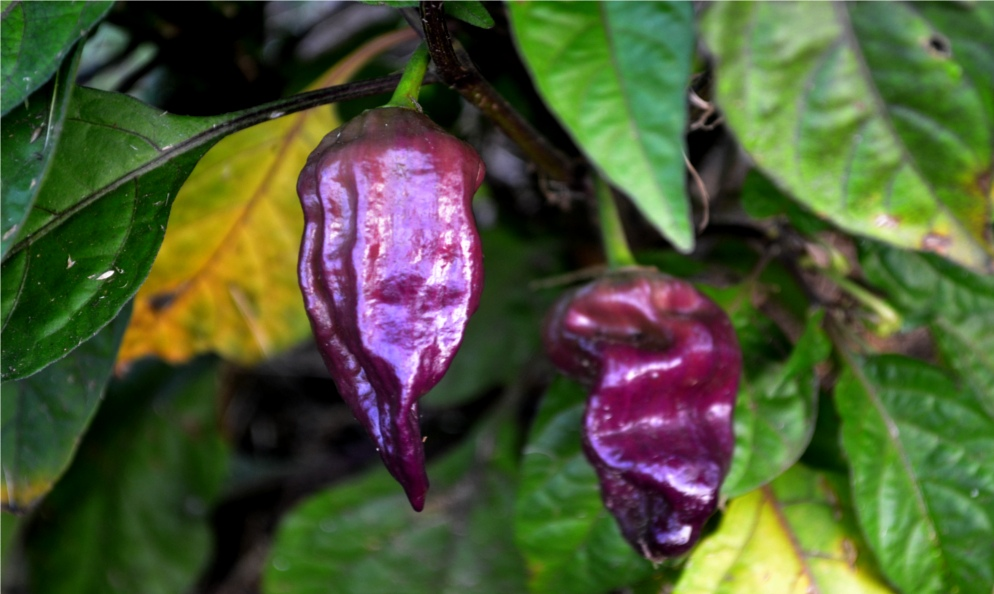
Purple ghost pepper

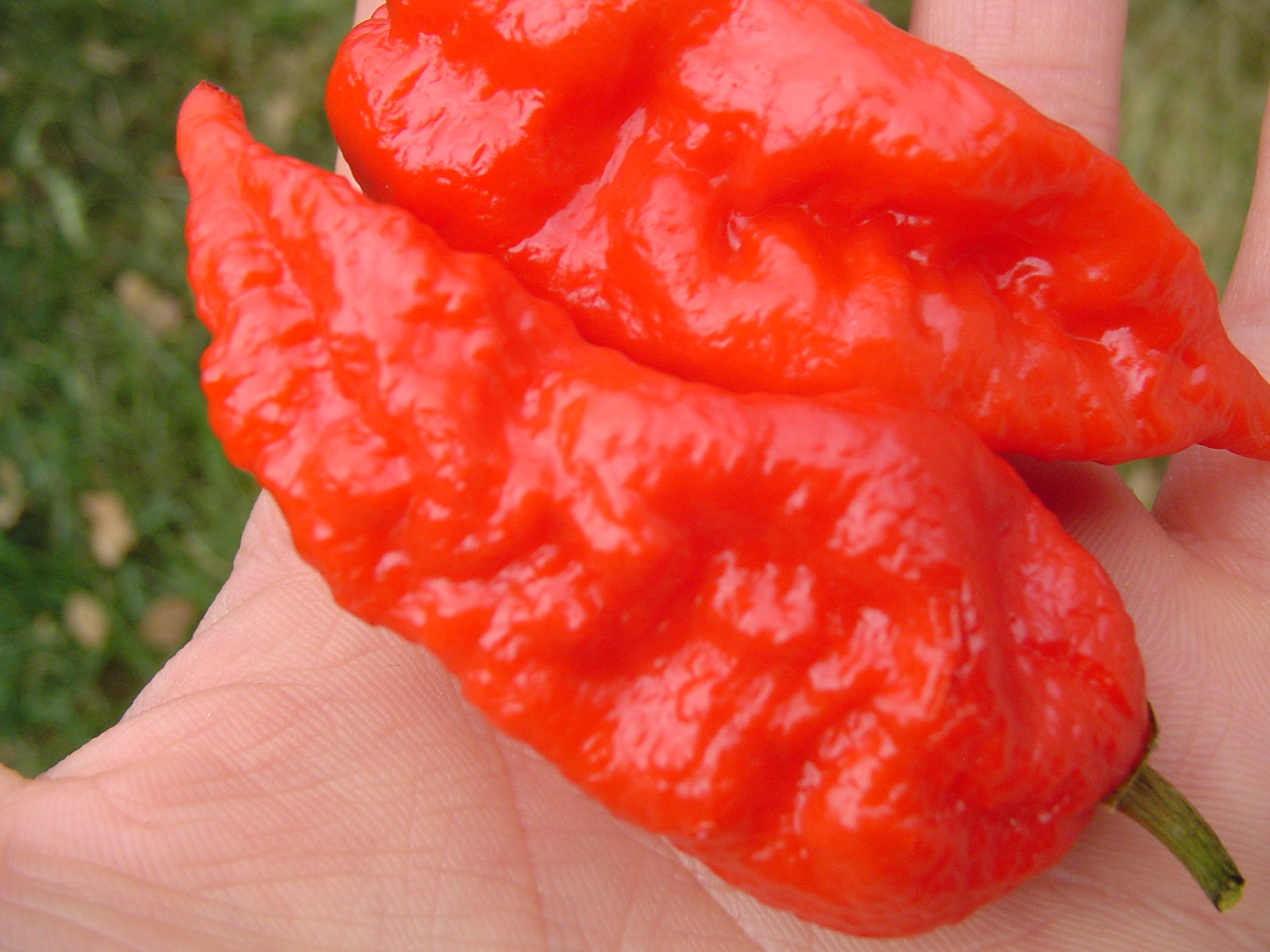
Red ghost pepper

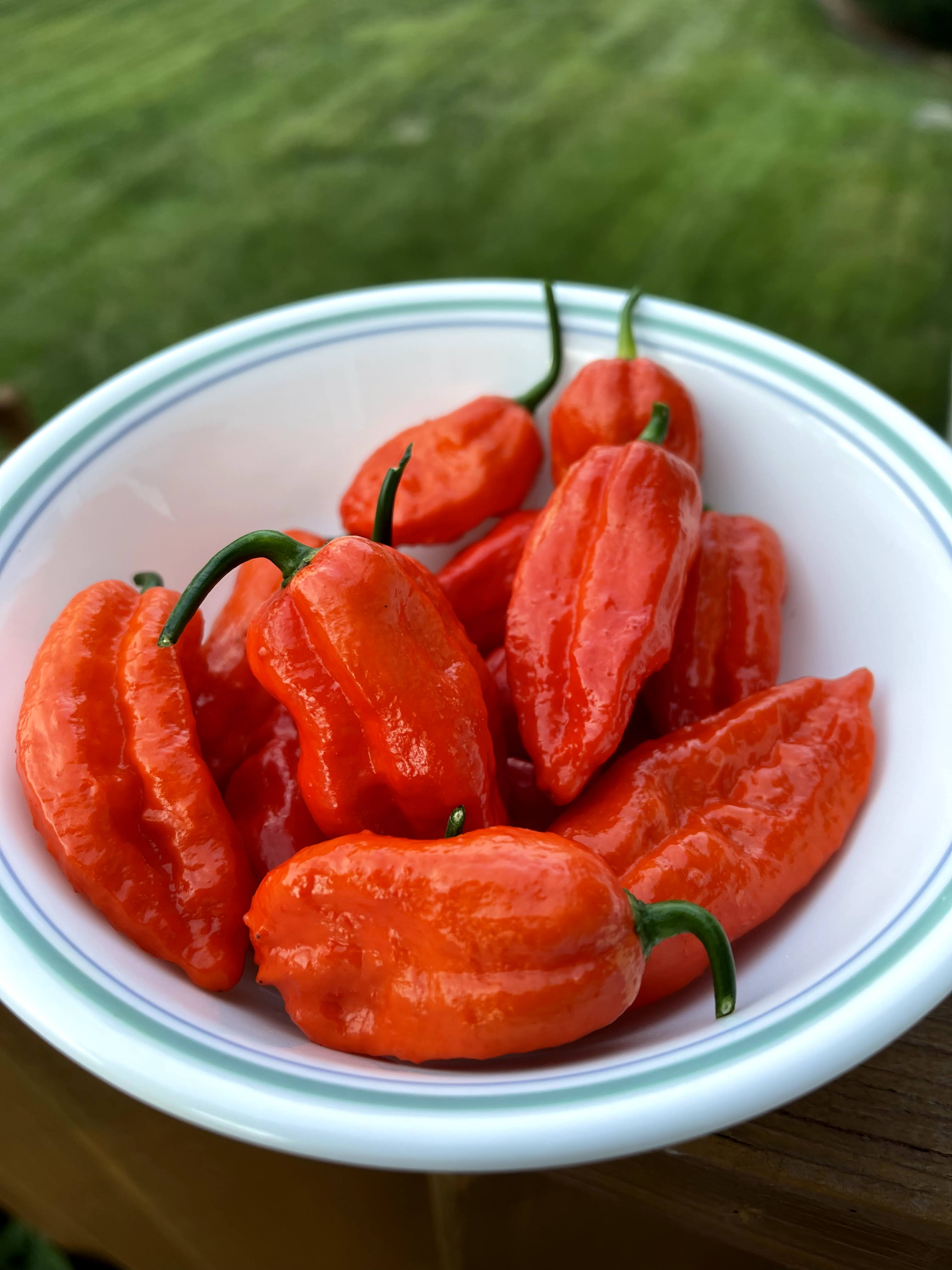
Ripe, harvested bhut jolokia

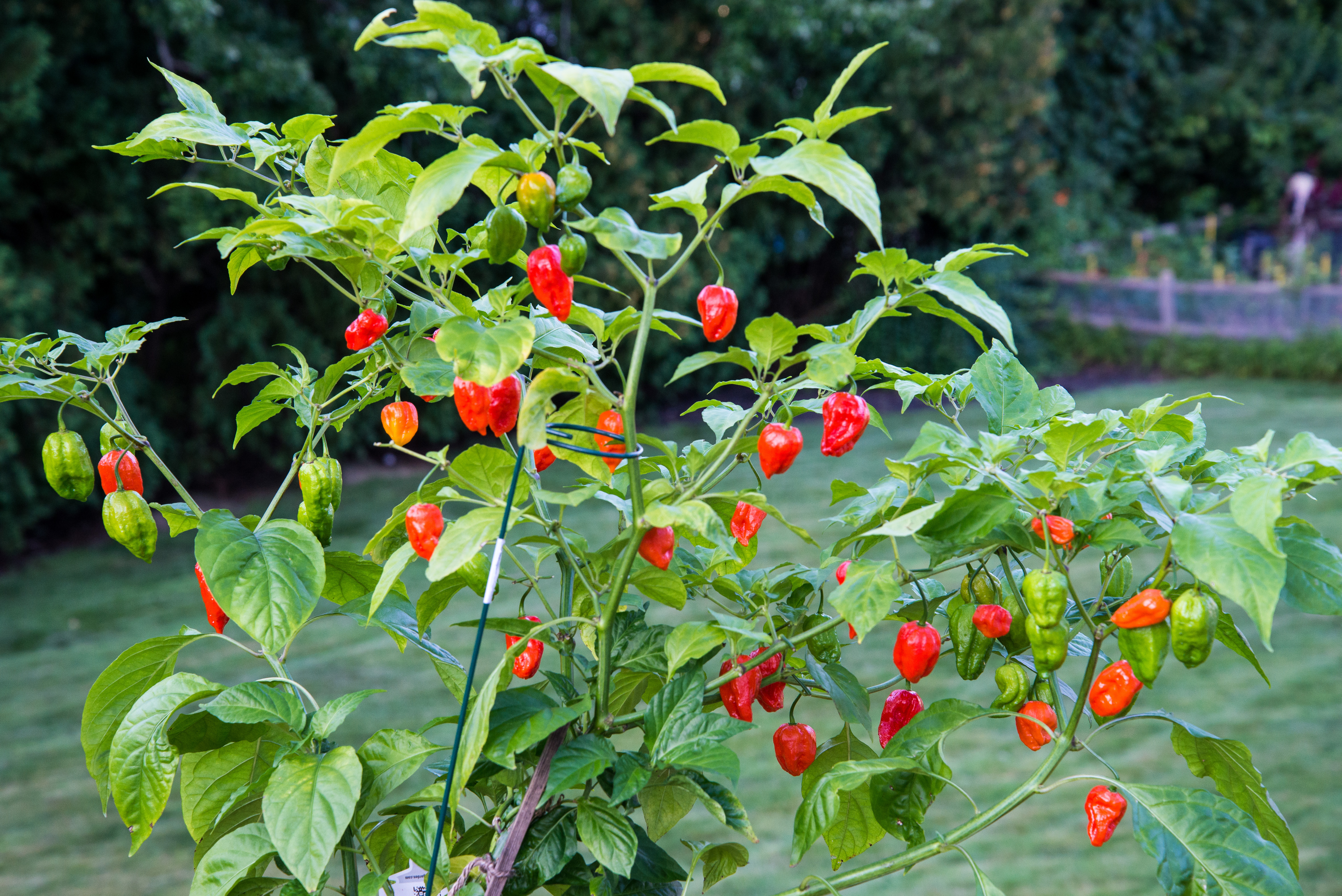
Bhut jolokia/ghost pepper plant

== See also ==
- Naga Morich
- List of Capsicum cultivars
