= Trinidad Scorpion Butch T pepper =

Chili pepper

Trinidad Scorpion Pepper "Butch T"
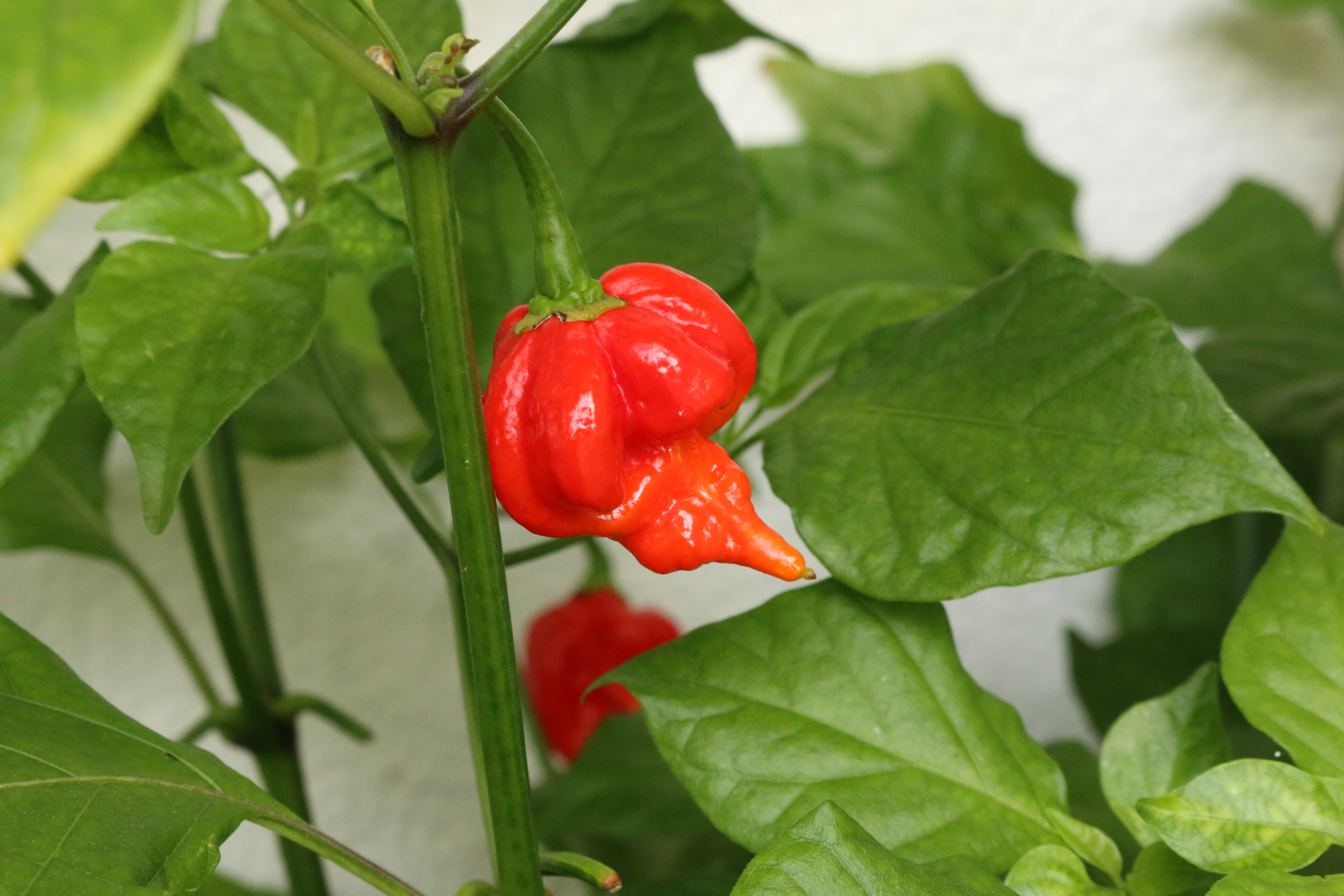
- Trinidad Scorpion pepper pods
- Species: Capsicum chinense
- Hybrid parentage: Trinidad scorpion
- Breeder: Butch Taylor
- Origin: Crosby, Mississippi
- Heat: Exceptionally hot
- Scoville scale: 1,000,000 - 1,463,700 SHU

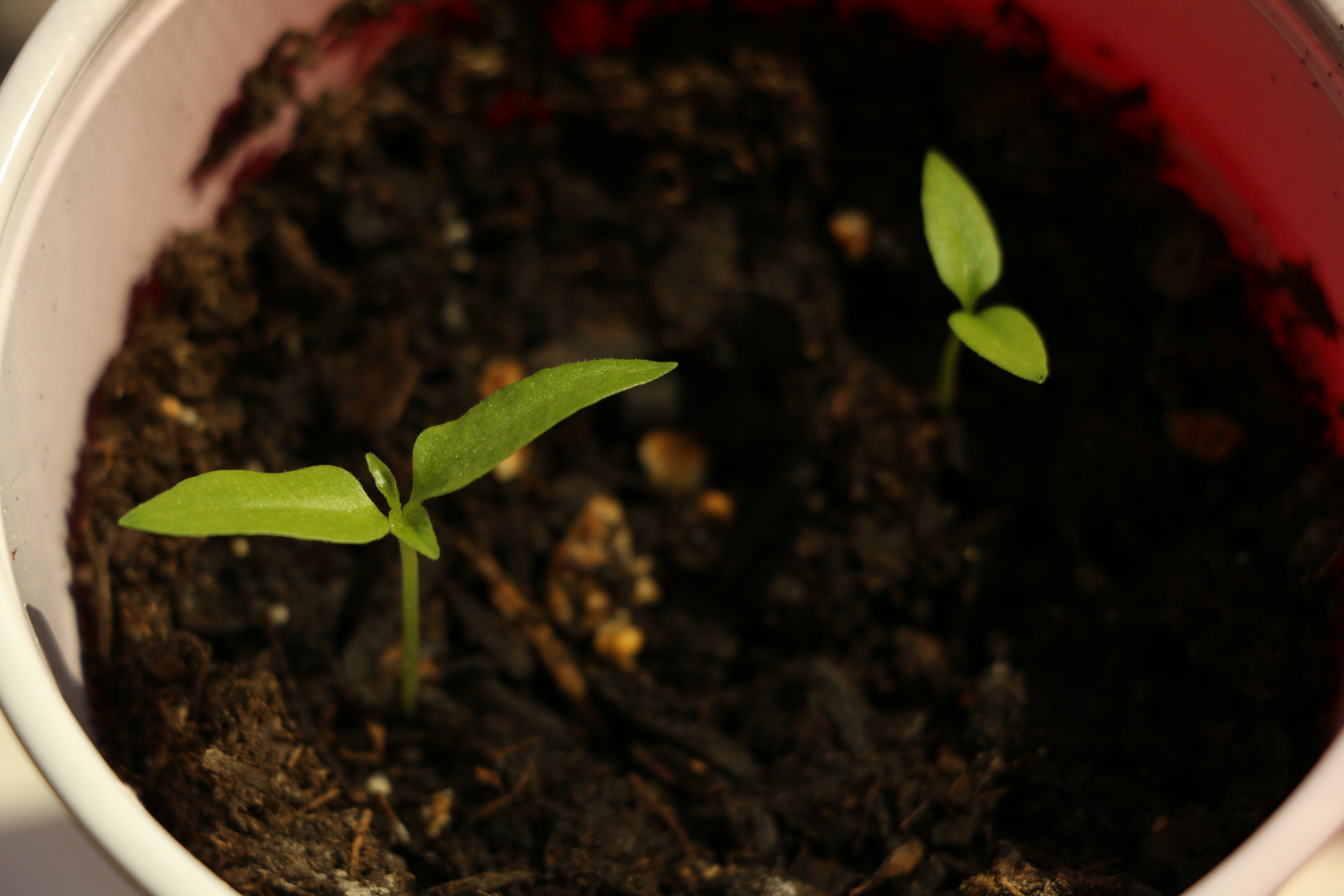
Sprouts

The Trinidad Scorpion Butch T is a Capsicum chinense cultivar that is among the hottest peppers in the world. It is a hybrid pepper and thus not indigenous to anywhere; however, its hybrid parentage is derived from the Trinidad Moruga scorpion indigenous to Trinidad and Tobago. It was named by Neil Smith of the Hippy Seed Company, after he got the seeds originally from Butch Taylor (the owner of Zydeco Farms in Woodville/Crosby, Mississippi, and a hot sauce company) who is responsible for propagating the pepper's seeds. The "scorpion" peppers are referred to as such because the pointed end of the pepper is said to resemble a scorpion's stinger.

== World record ==
The Trinidad scorpion 'Butch T' pepper was, for three years, ranked the most pungent ("hot") pepper in the world according to Guinness World Records. A laboratory test conducted in March 2011 measured a specimen at 1,463,700 Scoville heat units, officially ranking it the hottest pepper in the world at the time. (Note: The pungency of a species of chili pepper can vary by up to a factor of 10 depending on the conditions under which the specimen grew.) One possible secret to the chili's heat, according to a cultivator of the pepper, is fertilizing the soil with the liquid runoff of a worm farm. In August 2013, Guinness World Records recognized the Carolina Reaper as the hottest pepper in the world, at 1,569,300 SHU.

== See also ==
- Race to grow the hottest pepper
- Trinidad Moruga scorpion
