= Pepper X =

Cultivar of Capsicum chili pepper

- Species: Capsicum chinense
- Breeder: Ed Currie
- Origin: Fort Mill, South Carolina, United States
- Heat: Exceptionally hot
- Scoville scale: On average: 2,693,000 SHU

Pepper X is a cultivar of chili pepper recognized by Guinness World Records in 2023 as the world's hottest chili pepper. It was bred by Ed Currie, the creator of the Carolina Reaper.

== Development ==
Pepper X is a crossbreed of a Carolina Reaper and a pepper sent to Currie by a friend. Currie and his team began developing the pepper around 2013. According to Currie, only five people, including himself, had ever eaten a whole Pepper X as of 2023.

== Details ==
Pepper X measures an average of 2.693 million Scoville heat units (SHU), beating the previous world record of 1.64 million SHU held by the Carolina Reaper. While the seeds of the chili pepper produce no capsaicin, the chemical that produces the pepper's heat, the chemical is produced in highest concentration within the placental tissue holding the seeds. As claimed by Guinness World Records, the curves and ridges of a Pepper X chili create more surface area for its placenta to grow.

== Criticism ==
Pepper X's heat status has been criticized, because independent testing of the pepper has not been performed.
