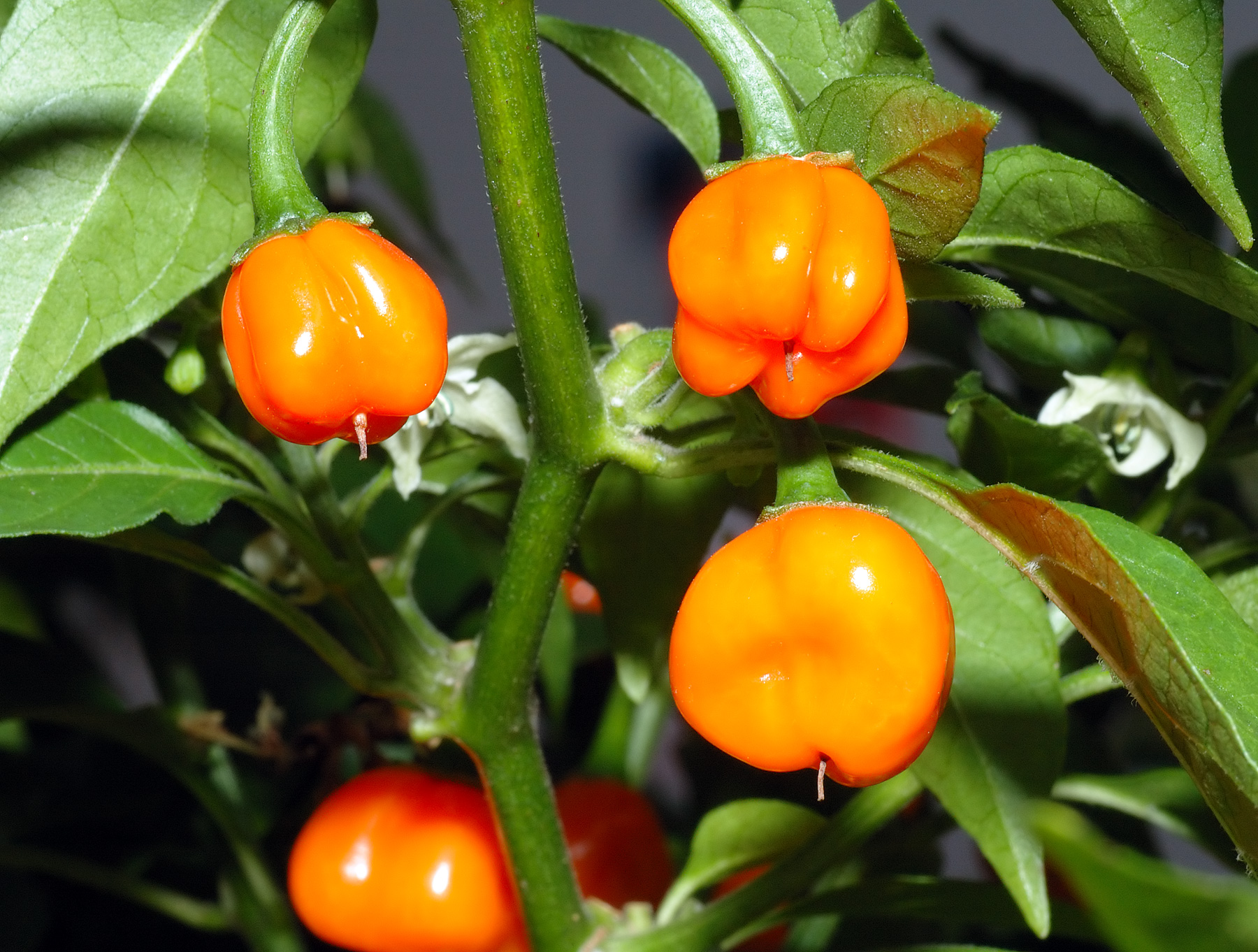
- Habanero fruits

Scientific classification
- Kingdom: Plantae
- Clade: Tracheophytes
- Clade: Angiosperms
- Clade: Eudicots
- Clade: Asterids
- Order: Solanales
- Family: Solanaceae
- Genus: Capsicum
- Species: C. chinense

Binomial name
- Capsicum chinense Jacq.

Synonyms
- List: Capsicum assamicum J.Purkay. & Lok.Singh; Capsicum cerasiforme Mill.; Capsicum cereolum Bertol.; Capsicum dichotomum Vell.; Capsicum luteum Lam.; Capsicum odoriferum Vell.; Capsicum oxycarpum Dunal; Capsicum sinense Murray; Capsicum toxicarium Poepp.; Capsicum ustulatum Paxton

= Capsicum chinense =

Species of flowering plant

Capsicum chinense, commonly known as a "habanero-type pepper", is a species of chili pepper native to the Americas. C. chinense varieties are well known for their unique flavors and, in many cases, exceptional heat. The hottest peppers in the world are members of this species, with a Scoville heat unit score of 2.69 million measured in the C. chinense cultivar Pepper X in 2023.

Some taxonomists consider C. chinense to be within the species C. annuum, and they are a member of the C. annuum complex; however, C. chinense and C. annuum pepper plants can sometimes be distinguished by the number of flowers or fruit per node – two to five for C. chinense and one for C. annuum – though this method is not always accurate. The two species can also hybridize and generate inter-specific hybrids. C. frutescens may be the ancestor to the C. chinense species.

== Taxonomy ==
The scientific species name C. chinense or C. sinensis ("Chinese capsicum") is a misnomer. All Capsicum species originated in the New World. Nikolaus Joseph von Jacquin (1727–1817), a Dutch botanist, erroneously named the species in 1776, because he believed it originated in China due to its prevalence in Chinese cuisine; however, it was later found to have been introduced into China by earlier European explorers during the Ming dynasty.

== Plant appearance ==
Within C. chinense, the appearance and characteristics of the plants can vary greatly. Varieties such as the well-known Habanero grow to form small, compact perennial bushes about 0.5 metres (1 ft 8 in) in height. The flowers, as with most Capsicum species, are small and white with five petals. A diagnostic feature of the species is the calyx of the fruit, which has a distinct annular constriction where it joins the stalk, and the plants tend to bear two or more flowers at each node, in contrast to Capsicum annuum, which usually bears a single flower per node. These characters are shared with the closely related Capsicum frutescens, and the two species can be difficult to tell apart. When it forms, the fruit varies greatly in color and shape, with red, orange, and yellow being the most common mature colors, but colors such as brown and purple are also known. Another similarity with other species would be shallow roots, which are very common.

== Distribution ==
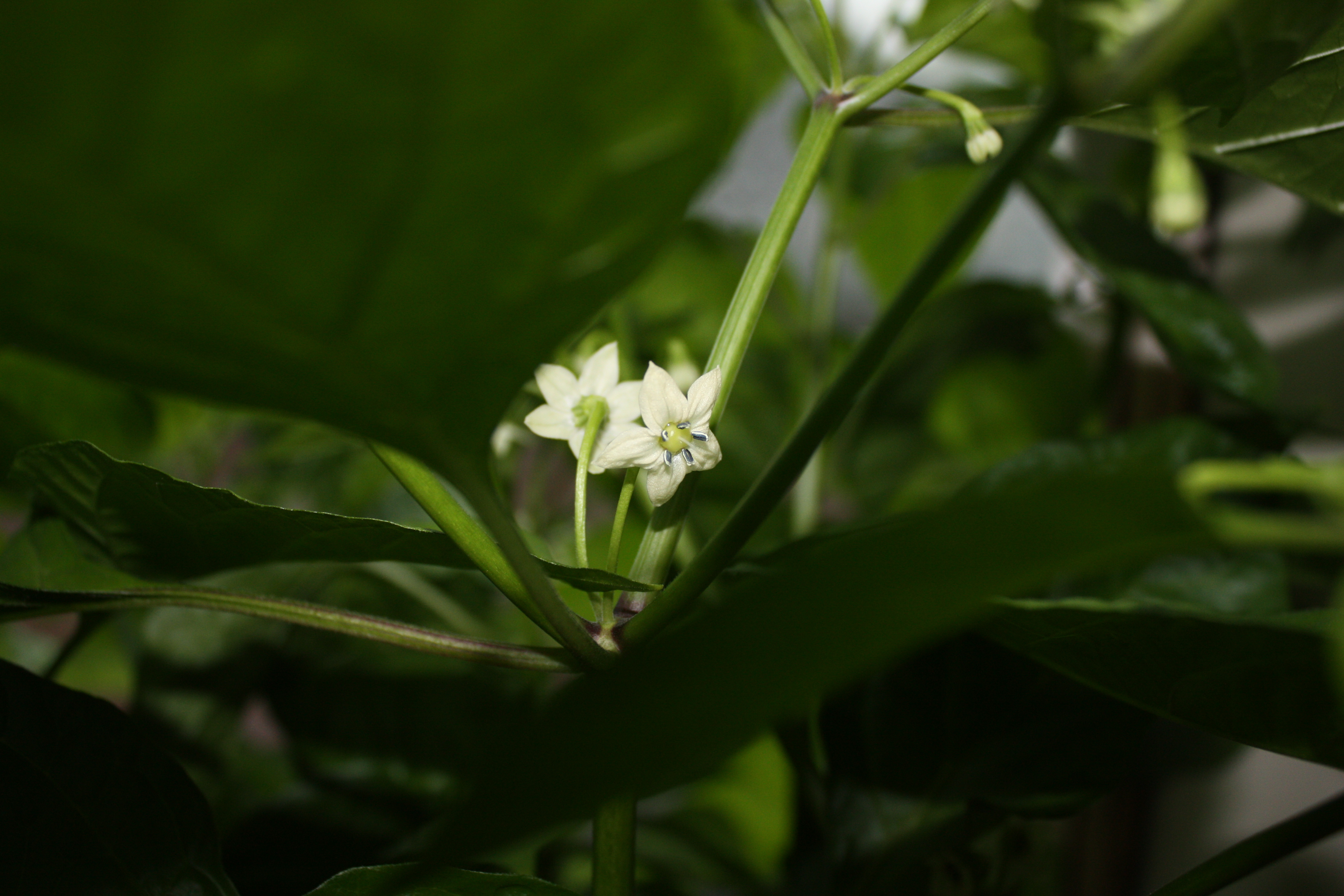
Close-up photograph of a typical C. chinense flower ('Madame Jeanette' variety)

The origin of C. chinense is not an easy matter to settle. However, several reports by McLeod, Pickersgill, and Eshbaugh put its center of origin in the tropical northern Amazon, ranging from Southern Brazil to Bolivia (Eshbaugh, W.H.1993. History and Exploitation of a serendipitous new crop discovery. p. 132-139. In: J. Janick and J.E. Simon (eds), New Crops. Wiley, New York). Later on, it migrated to the Caribbean basin and Cuba originating the term Habanero, meaning from Habana (Havana, Cuba), where several peppers of this species were exported out from this port. (Despite the name, habaneros and other spicy-hot ingredients are rarely ever used in traditional Cuban cooking.)

In warm climates such as these, it is a perennial and can last for several years, but in cooler climates, C. chinense does not usually survive the winter. It will readily germinate from the previous year's seed in the following growing season, however.

== Domestication, cultivation and agriculture ==
Seeds of C. chinense have been found in cave dwellings in Central America that indicate the natives have been consuming peppers since 7,000 B.C. In Eastern Mexico, dry pepper fruits and seeds have been recovered from 9,000 years old burials in Tamaulipas and Tehuacán, further indicating their use since 7,000 B.C. Domestication might have taken place 10,000 to 12,000 years ago in Central–East Mexico.

C. chinense peppers have been cultivated for thousands of years in their native regions, but have only been available in areas outside of the Americas for about 400–500 years following the Columbian Exchange. Selection in the new environments have led to the rise of new varieties that are bred and farmed in Asia and Africa.

C. chinense are also popular with many gardeners for their bright colors (ornamental value) and for their fruit.

== Culinary use ==
C. chinense and its varieties have been used for millennia in Yucatán and Caribbean-style cooking to add a significant amount of heat to their traditional food. They are mainly used in stews and sauces, as well as marinades for meats and chicken.

American food at times also uses some of these chiles. For example, habaneros (a group of C. chinense varieties) are commonly used in hot sauces and extra-spicy salsas, due to the popularity of Tex-Mex and Mexican cuisines in American culture.

== Common C. chinense varieties ==
=== Varieties ===
C. chinense has many different varieties, including:

- 7-Pot chili (Trinidad)
  - 7-Pot cultivar '7-Pot Primo' (Louisiana)
- Adjuma (Suriname)
- Ají chombo (Panama)
- Ají dulce (Cuba, Dominican Republic, Puerto Rico, Venezuela), a non-spicy cultivar
- Arriba Saia (Brazil)
- Bhut jolokia (Assam)
  - Bhut jolokia cultivar 'Dorset' Naga pepper
- Cabai ceremai (Indonesia)
- Cabik geronong (Sarawak, Malaysia)
- Datil (Florida)
- Fatalii (south central Africa)
- Habanero chile (Caribbean, Central America and Mexico)
  - Carolina Reaper (South Carolina)
  - Habanero cultivar 'Red Savina'
  - Cabai gendol (Indonesia)
- Hainan yellow lantern chili (Hainan Island, South China)
- Kambuzi pepper, Malawian pepper
- 'Madame Jeanette' (Suriname)
- Nayi Miris නයි මිරිස් (Sri Lanka)
- Pepper X (South Carolina)
- Scotch bonnet (Jamaica, Trinidad)
- Trinidad scorpion (Trinidad)
  - Trinidad scorpion cultivar Trinidad scorpion 'Butch T'
  - Trinidad scorpion cultivar Trinidad scorpion moruga blend
- Ají panca (Peru)

=== Hybrids and landraces ===
- Armageddon pepper (w/ C. frutescens)
