= Trinidad Moruga scorpion =

Exceptionally hot chili pepper

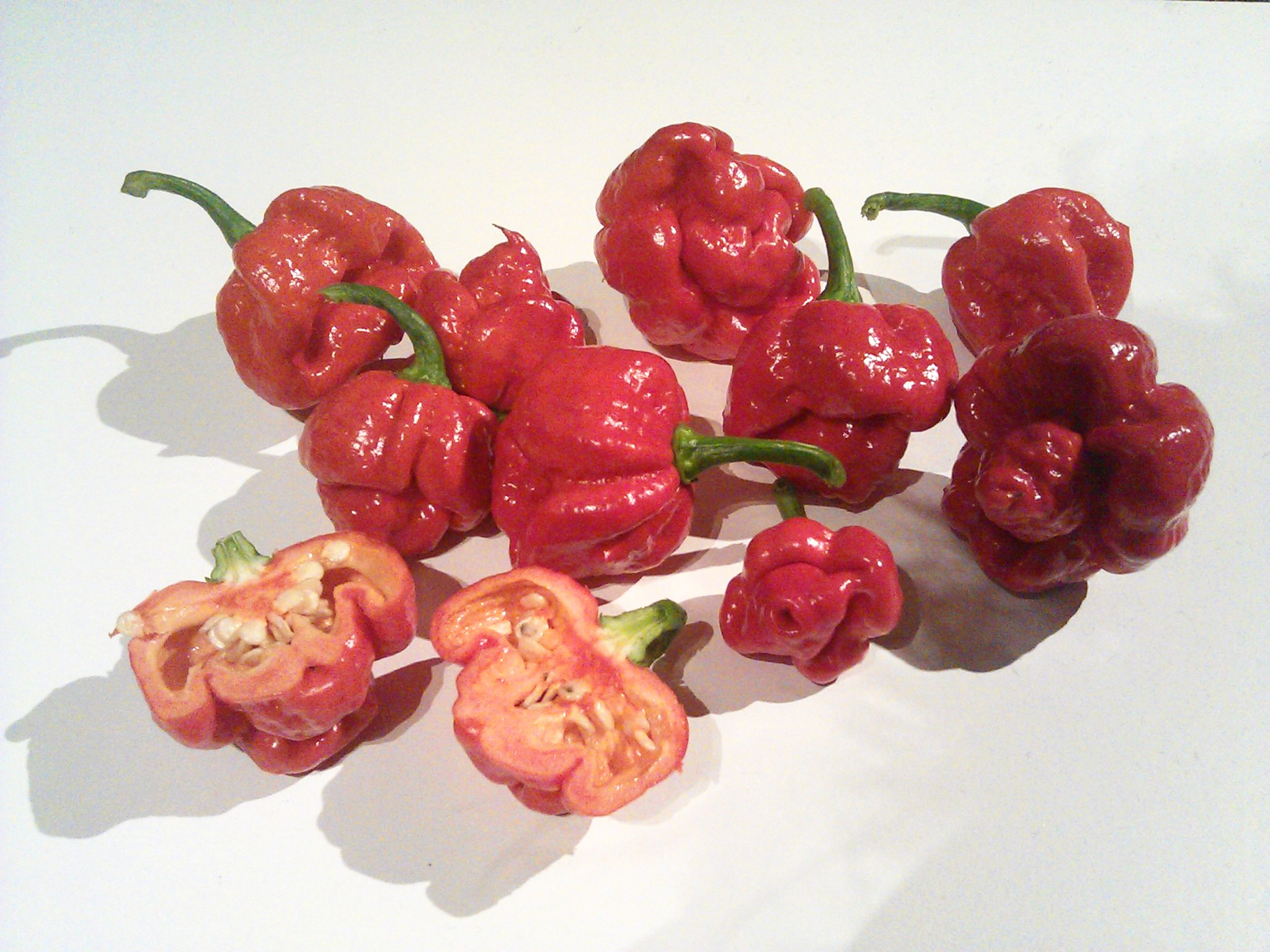
- Species: Capsicum chinense
- Breeder: Wahid Ogeer
- Origin: Moruga, Trinidad and Tobago
- Heat: Exceptionally hot
- Scoville scale: 1,207,764 average SHU

The Trinidad Moruga scorpion (a cultivar of Capsicum chinense) is a chili pepper native to the village of Moruga, Trinidad and Tobago. In 2012, New Mexico State University's Chile Pepper Institute identified the Trinidad Moruga scorpion as the hottest chili pepper at that time, with heat of 1.2 million Scoville heat units (SHUs).

By 2017, according to Guinness World Records, the hottest pepper was the Carolina Reaper, with 1.6 million SHU.

== Overview ==
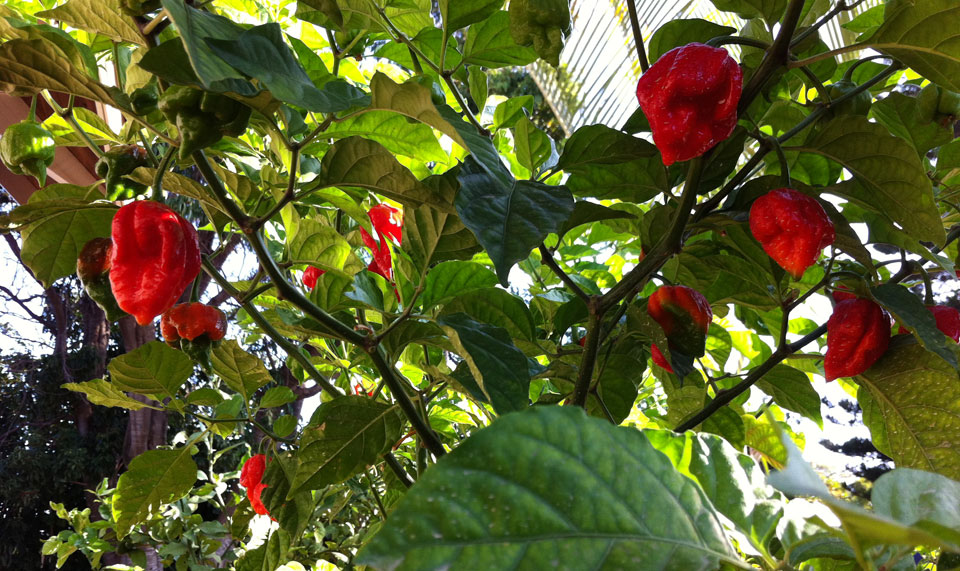
Trinidad Moruga scorpion, ripe and ready to pick

The yellow cultivar of the Trinidad Moruga Scorpion was created by Wahid Ogeer of Trinidad.

Paul Bosland, a chili pepper expert and director of the Chile Pepper Institute, said, "You take a bite. It doesn't seem so bad, and then it builds and it builds and it builds. So it is quite nasty."

Aside from the heat, the Trinidad Moruga scorpion has a tender fruit-like flavor, which makes it a sweet-hot combination.
