= Scoville scale =

Scale for measuring spiciness of peppers

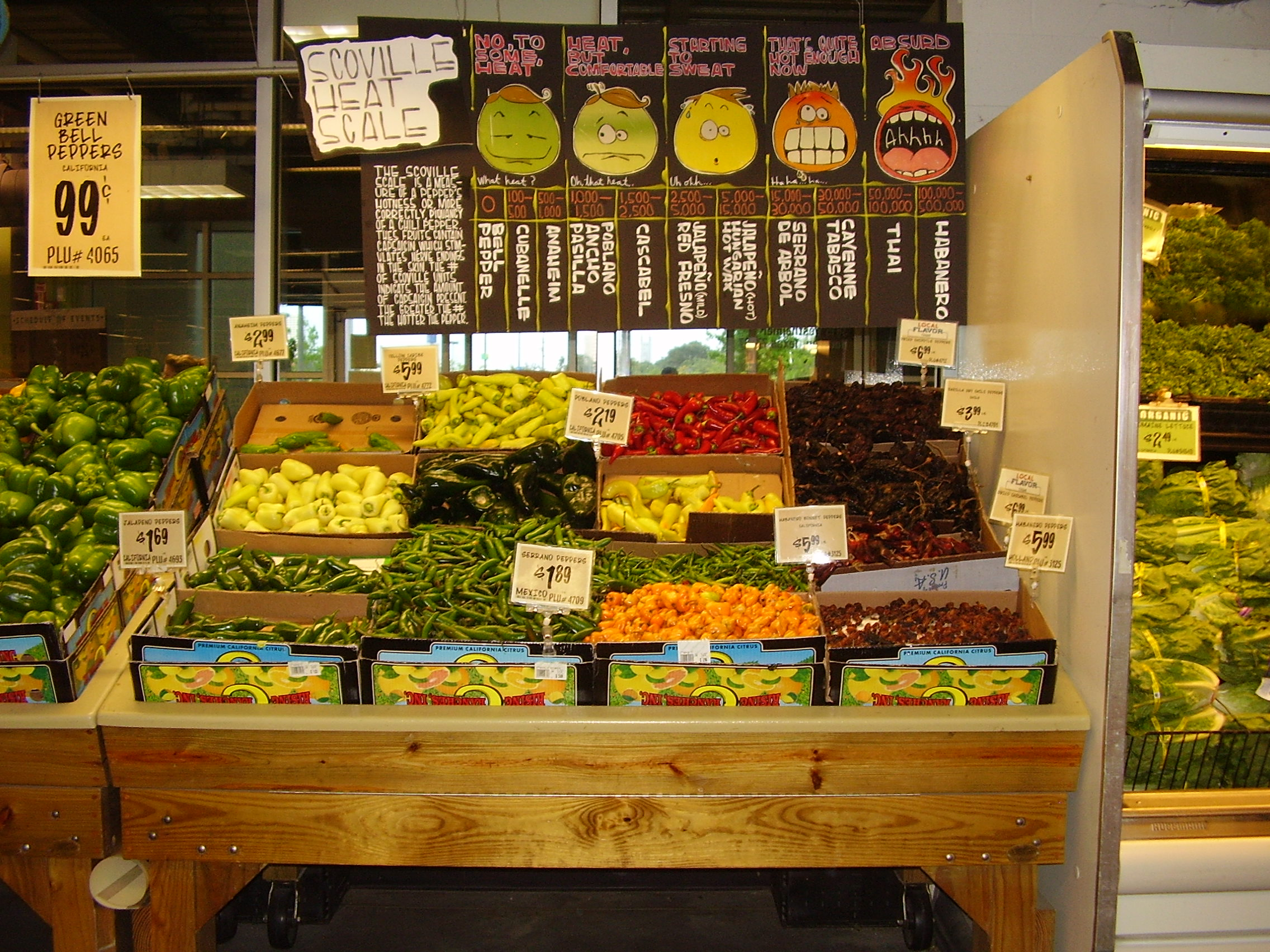
Pepper stand at Central Market in Houston, Texas, showing its peppers ranked on the Scoville scale

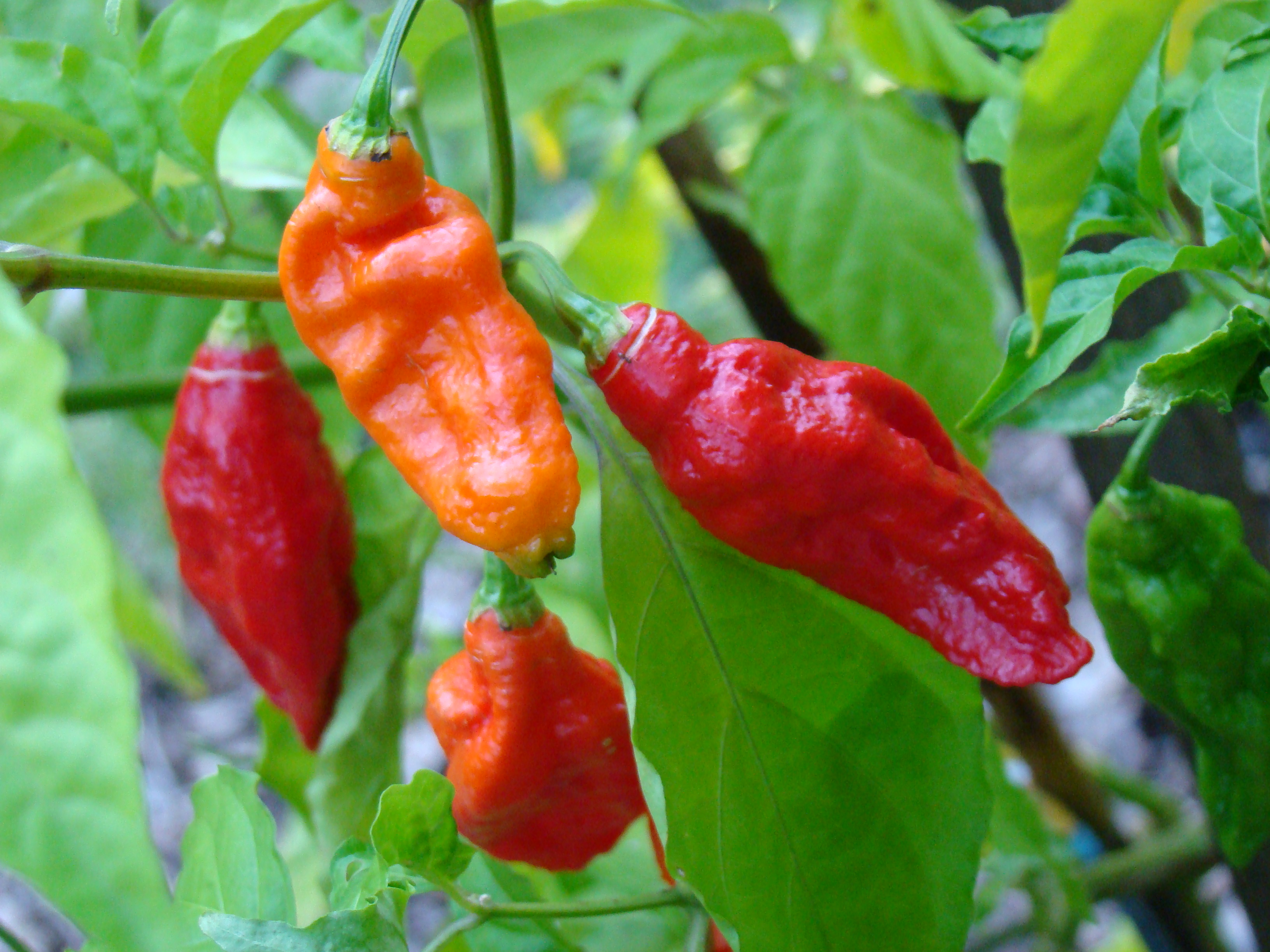
The ghost pepper of Northeast India is considered to be a "very hot" pepper, at about 1 million SHU.

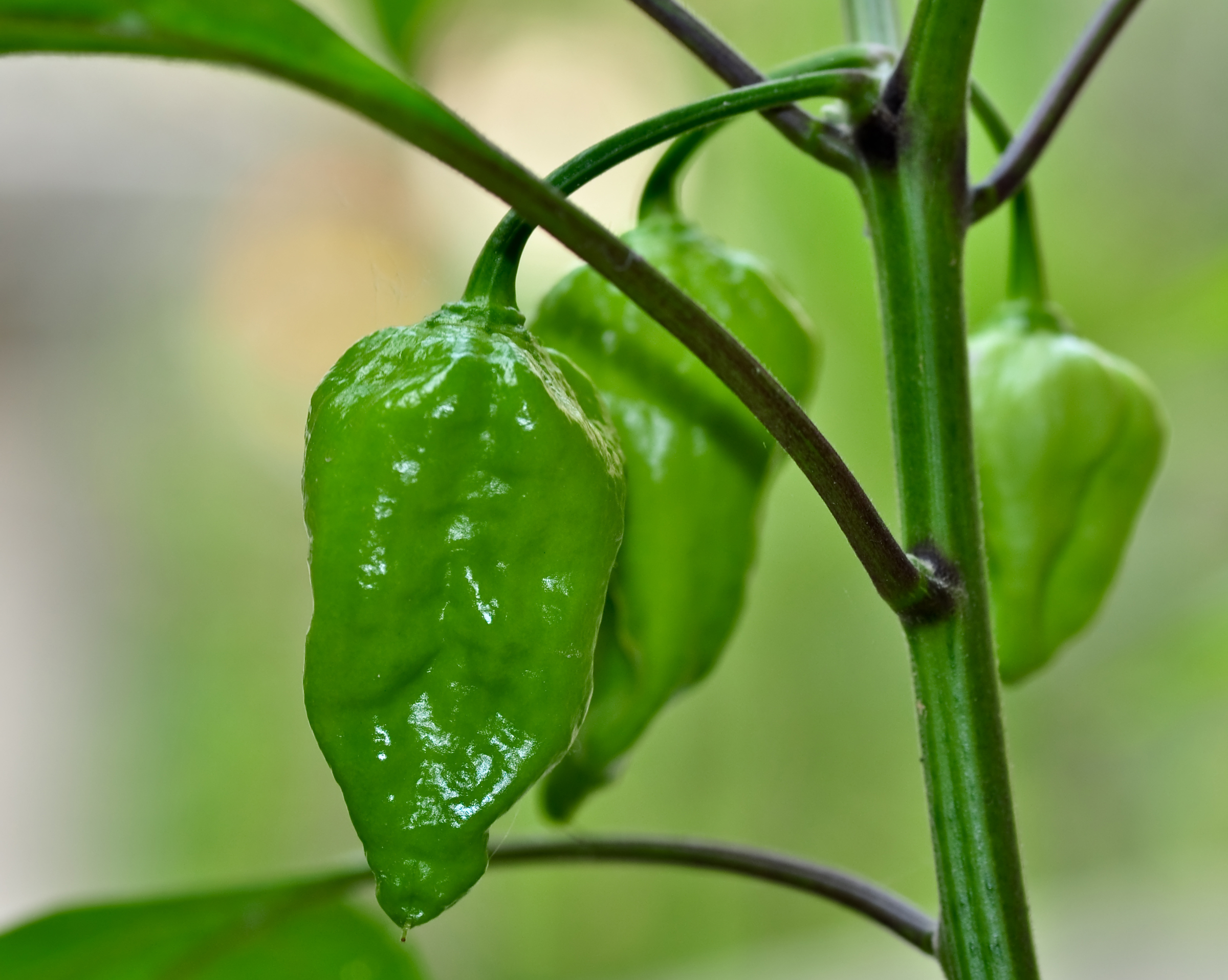
The Naga Morich, with around 1 million SHU, is primarily grown in Bangladesh and India.

The Scoville scale is a measurement of spiciness of chili peppers and other substances, recorded in Scoville heat units (SHU). It is based on the concentration of capsaicinoids, among which capsaicin is the predominant component.

The scale is named after its creator, American pharmacist Wilbur Scoville, whose 1912 method is known as the Scoville organoleptic test. The Scoville organoleptic test is a subjective assessment derived from the capsaicinoid sensitivity by people experienced with eating hot chilis.

An alternative method, high-performance liquid chromatography (HPLC), can be used to analytically quantify the capsaicinoid content as an indicator of pungency.

== Scoville organoleptic test ==
In the Scoville organoleptic test, an exact weight of dried pepper is dissolved in alcohol to extract the heat components (capsaicinoids), then diluted in a solution of sugar water. Decreasing concentrations of the extracted capsaicinoids are given to a panel of five trained tasters, until a majority (at least three) can no longer detect the heat in a dilution. The heat level is based on this dilution, rated in multiples of 100 SHU.

Another source using subjective assessment stated, "Conventional methods used in determining the level of pungency or capsaicin concentration are using a panel of tasters (Scoville organoleptic test method). ... Pepper pungency is measured in Scoville heat units (SHU). This measurement is the highest dilution of a chili pepper extract at which heat can be detected by a taste panel."

A weakness of the Scoville organoleptic test is its imprecision due to human subjectivity, depending on the taster's palate and number of mouth heat receptors, which vary widely among subjects. Another shortcoming is sensory fatigue; the palate is quickly desensitized to capsaicinoids after tasting a few samples within a short time period. Results vary widely (up to ± 50%) between laboratories.

== Approximations ==
=== Quantification by HPLC ===
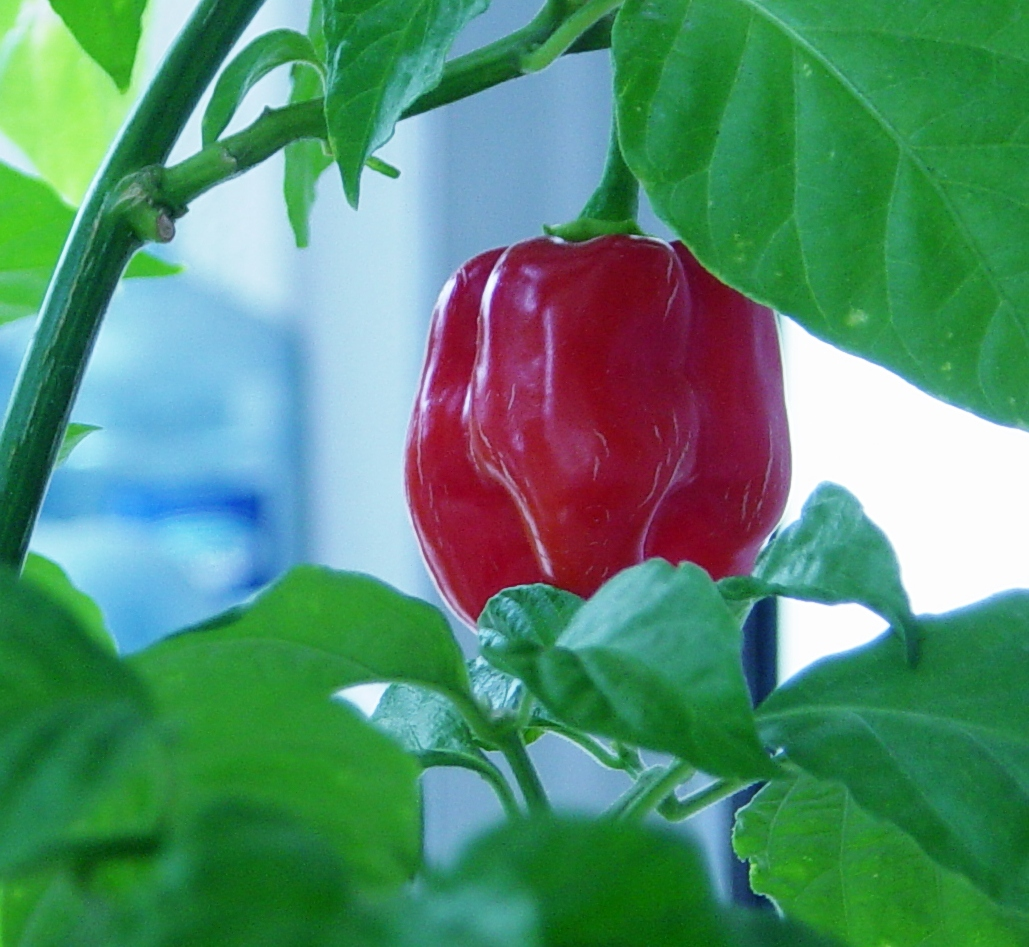
The Red Savina pepper, a hot chili

Since the 1980s, spice heat has been assessed quantitatively by high-performance liquid chromatography (HPLC), which measures the concentration of heat-producing capsaicinoids, typically with capsaicin content as the main measure. As stated in one review "the most reliable, rapid, and efficient method to identify and quantify capsaicinoids is HPLC; the results of which can be converted to Scoville heat units by multiplying the parts-per-million by 16." (Note: Some sources such as Guzman state a factor of 16 in line with the 16,000,000 SHU figure of pure capsaicin. However, Guzman cites the Collins source, which clearly states 15 per ASTA.)

HPLC method gives results in American Spice Trade Association 1985 "pungency units", which are defined as one part capsaicin equivalent per million parts dried pepper mass. This "parts per million of heat" (ppmH) is found with the following calculation:
$$\text{ppmH}  = \frac{\text{peak area}({\text{capsaicin})} + 0.82\cdot \text{peak area}(\text{dihydrocapsaicin)}}{\text{peak area}(\text{standard)}}$$

Peak areas are calculated from HPLC traces of dry samples of the substance to be tested in 1 ml of acetonitrile. The standard used to calibrate the calculation is 1 gram of capsaicin. Scoville heat units are found by multiplying the ppmH value by a factor of 15. By this definition of ppmH, spicy compounds other than the two most important capsaicinoids are ignored, despite the ability of HPLC to measure these other compounds at the same time.

=== Eye-wiping assay ===
The HPLC test only quantifies the amount of two specific capsaicinoids present in a sample. When analyzing the pungency of previously untested chemicals without human experimentation, a common choice is the rodent eye-wiping assay, in which the concentration required to cause the animal to wipe their eye at a target frequency is measured to determine the relative pain-producing potency (RPP) of the new chemical.

== Scoville ratings ==
=== Considerations ===
Since Scoville ratings are defined per unit of dry mass, comparison of ratings between products having different water content can be misleading. For example, typical fresh chili peppers have a water content around 90%, whereas Tabasco sauce has a water content of 95%. For law-enforcement-grade pepper spray, values from 500,000 up to 5 million SHU have been reported, but the actual strength of the spray depends on the dilution. This problem can be overcome by stating the water content along with the Scoville value. One way to do so is the "D-value", defined as total mass divided by dry mass.

Numerical results for any specimen vary depending on its cultivation conditions and the uncertainty of the laboratory methods used to assess the capsaicinoid content. Pungency values for any pepper are variable, owing to expected variation within a species, possibly by a factor of 10 or more, depending on seed lineage, climate and humidity, and soil composition supplying nutrients. The described inaccuracies in measurement methods contribute to the imprecision of measured values.

=== Capsicum peppers ===
Capsicum chili peppers are commonly used to add pungency in cuisines worldwide. The range of pepper heat reflected by a Scoville score is from 500 or less (sweet peppers) to over 2.6 million (Pepper X) (table below; Scoville scales for individual chili peppers are in the respective linked article). Some peppers such as the Guntur chilli and Rocoto are excluded from the list due to their very wide SHU range. Others such as Dragon's Breath and Chocolate 7-pot have not been officially verified.

Scoville heat units	Examples
2,693,000	Pepper X
1,500,000–2,500,000	Carolina Reaper
750,000–1,500,000	Trinidad Moruga scorpion, Naga Viper pepper, Infinity chili, Ghost pepper
350,000–750,000	Red savina habanero
100,000–350,000	Habanero chili, Scotch bonnet pepper, Madame Jeanette
50,000–100,000	Bird's eye chili (Thai chili pepper), Malagueta pepper
25,000–50,000	Tabasco pepper, Cayenne pepper
10,000–25,000	Serrano pepper, Aleppo pepper, Cheongyang chili pepper
2,500–10,000	Jalapeño pepper, Guajillo chili
1,000–2,500	Poblano pepper
500–1,000	Cubanelle, Beaver Dam pepper
0–500	Banana pepper, Friggitello, Pimiento
0	Bell pepper, Peperone crusco

=== Capsaicinoids ===
The capsaicin "pharmacophore", the portion of the molecule that produces biological effects

The class of compounds causing pungency in plants such as chili peppers is called capsaicinoids, which display a linear correlation between concentration and Scoville scale, and may vary in content during ripening. Capsaicin is the major capsaicinoid in chili peppers.

The Scoville Heat Unit may be used to express the approximate pungency of other, unrelated TRPV1 agonists, sometimes with extrapolation for much hotter compounds. One such substance is resiniferatoxin, an alkaloid present in the sap of some species of Euphorbia plants (spurges). Since it is 1,000 times as hot as capsaicin, it would have a Scoville scale rating of 16 billion. In the table below, non-capsaicinoid compounds are italicized. The ratings for piperine (150,000 SHU) and gingerol (60,000 SHU) for example are comparative estimates and are not official Scoville ratings. While the ratings are expressed in Scoville Heat Units (SHU), they do not technically belong on the official Scoville scale because the scale is scientifically designed and defined exclusively for capsaicinoids found in chili peppers.

Scoville heat units	Chemical
16,000,000,000 (Note: Estimate; too strong to be used in human taste-testing.)	Resiniferatoxin
5,300,000,000	Tinyatoxin
16,000,000	Capsaicin
15,000,000	Dihydrocapsaicin
9,200,000	Nonivamide
9,100,000	Nordihydrocapsaicin
8,600,000	Homocapsaicin, Homodihydrocapsaicin
160,000	Shogaol
150,000	Piperine
60,000	Gingerol

== See also ==
- List of capsaicinoids
- Pyruvate scale
