= Carolina Reaper =

Exceptionally hot cultivar of C. chinense pepper plant

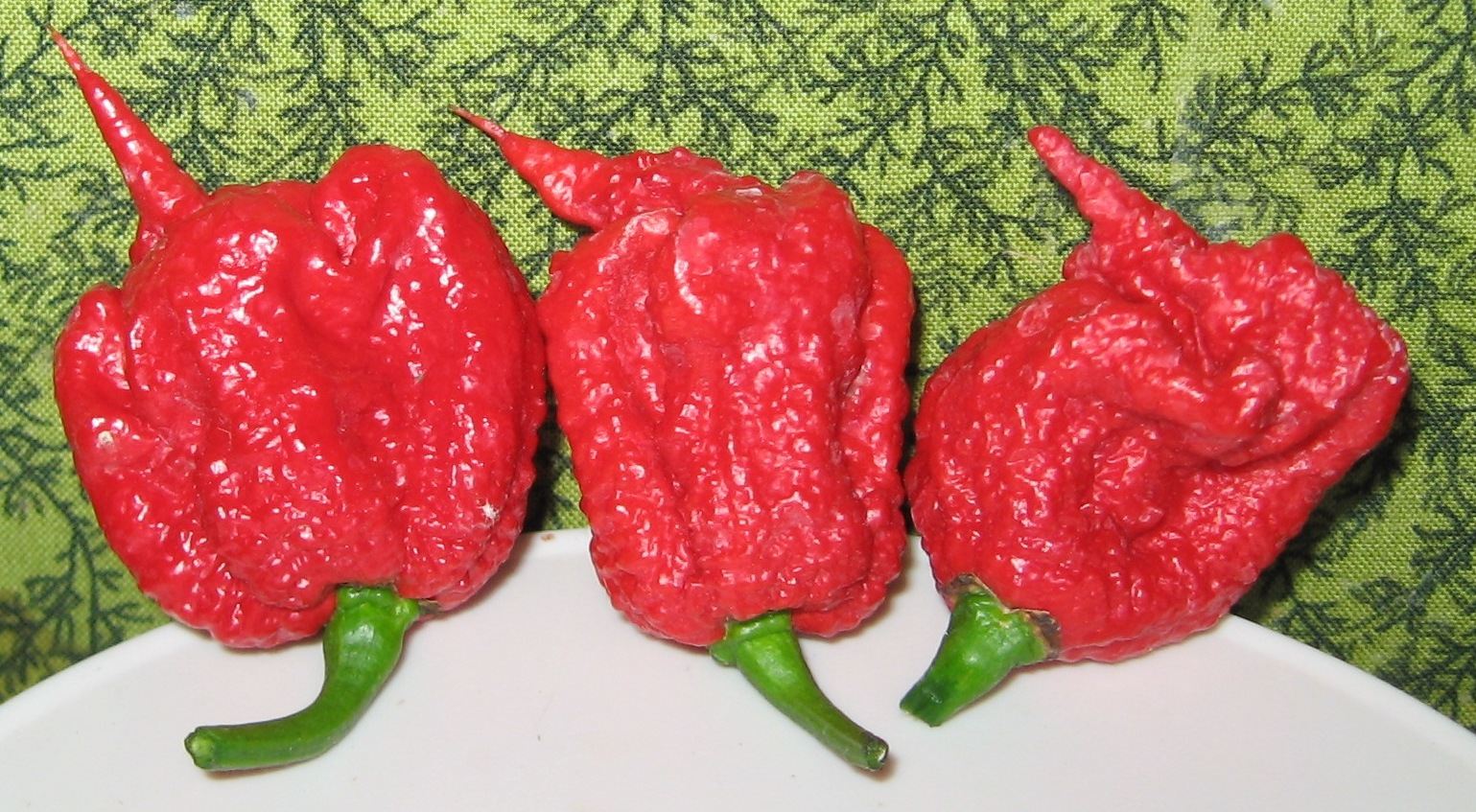
- Species: Capsicum chinense
- Hybrid parentage: Naga pepper x Habanero
- Breeder: Ed Currie
- Origin: Fort Mill, South Carolina, U.S.
- Heat: Exceptionally hot
- Scoville scale: 1,641,183 average SHU

The Carolina Reaper chili pepper is a cultivar of the Capsicum chinense plant. Developed by American breeder Ed Currie, the pepper is red and gnarled, with a bumpy texture and small pointed tail. It was the hottest chili pepper in the world according to Guinness World Records from 2013 to 2023 before it was surpassed by Pepper X, which was also developed by Currie.

== Development ==
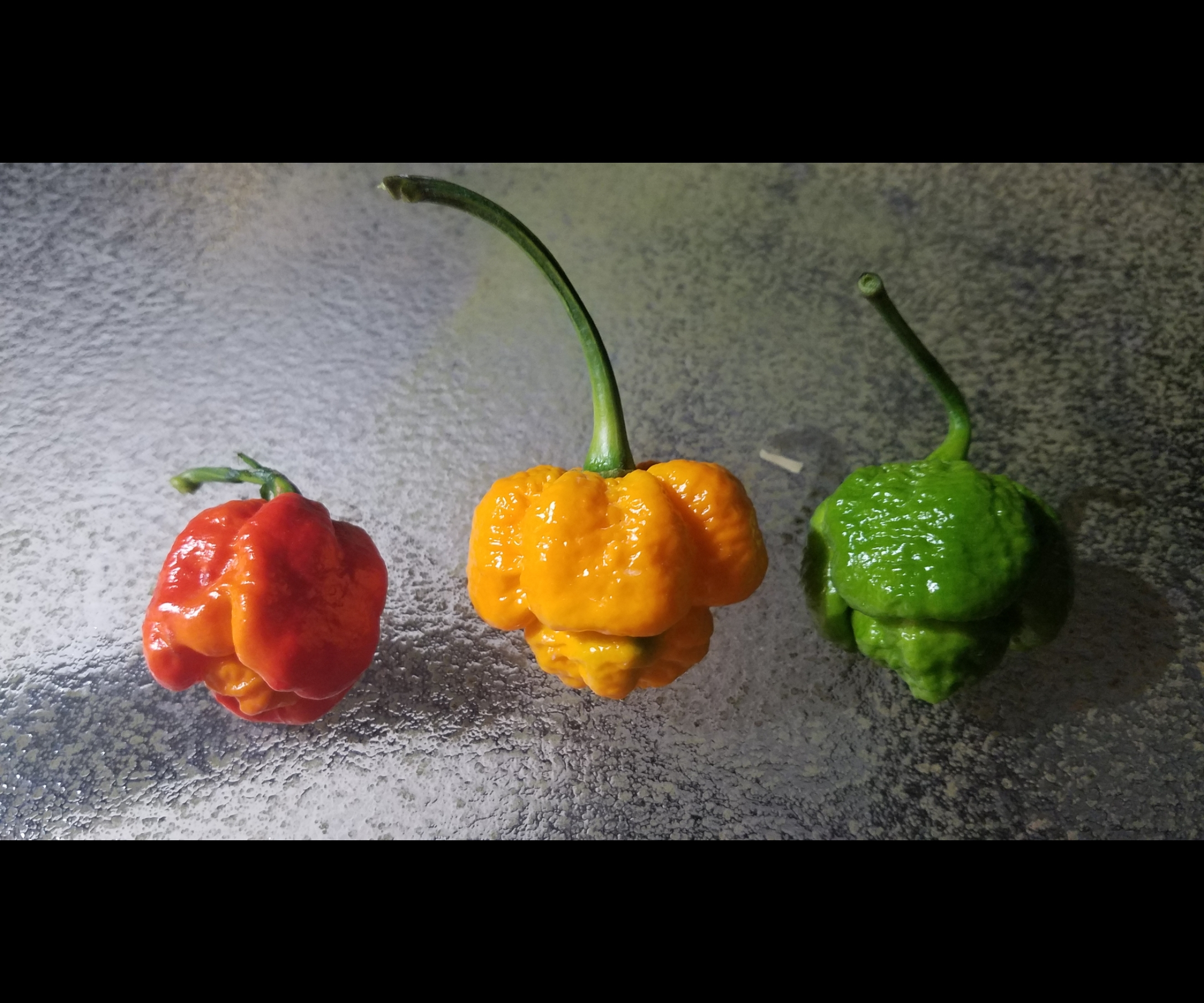
Reapers at different stages of reapering

Currie, an American breeder, began working around 2001 on what would become the Carolina Reaper. It took over 10 years to develop. Sorting through hundreds of hybrid combinations, Currie was finally successful at crossing a "really nastily hot" La Soufrière (Saint Vincent) Habanero pepper from the Caribbean island of Saint Vincent and a Naga pepper/Ghost pepper (locally known as bhüt jolokia) from Assam". (Note: His newly invented pepper was initially known as "HP22B" when first grown by Currie sometime in 2011.) During November of that year, a reporter from NPR visited Currie to try the new pepper. According to Currie's website: "The reporter ate a small piece of the pepper, rolled around on the floor, hallucinated, and then shared his experiences with the national media." Currie officially named the pepper: "Smokin' Ed's Carolina Reaper". The word "reaper" was chosen by Currie due to the shape of the pepper's "sickle-like" tail.

== Details ==
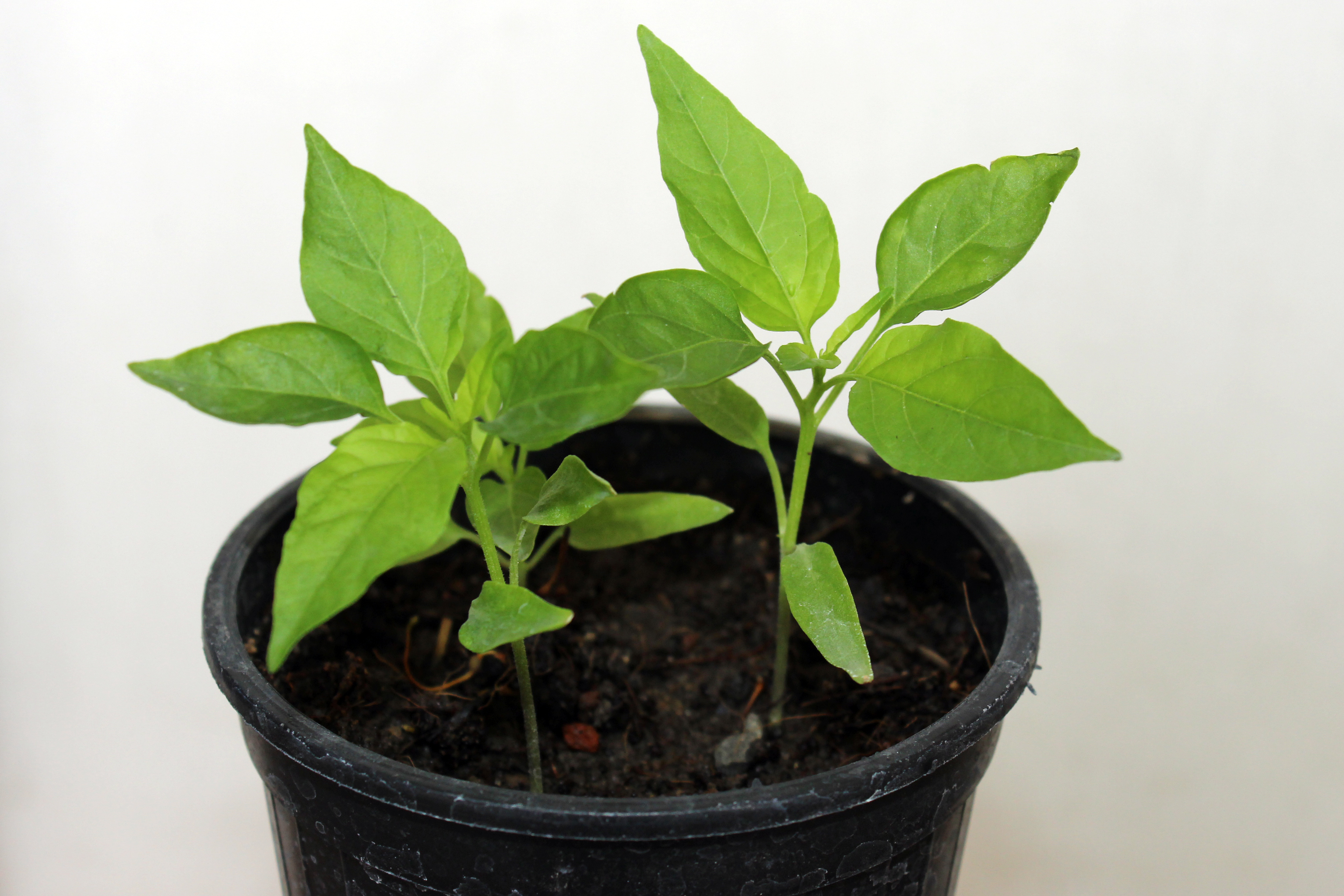
Carolina Reaper plant at 30 days

The Carolina Reaper was certified as the world's hottest chili pepper by Guinness World Records on August 11, 2017. Testing was conducted by Winthrop University in South Carolina during the certification process which showed an average heat level of 1,641,183 SHU for a given batch. Previously the record for the hottest pepper had been held by the scorpion pepper which measured in at 1,463,700 SHU in comparison. It was later claimed through media outlets such as the Associated Press that an individual Carolina Reaper had a heat level of 2.2 million SHU. (Note: This higher end number however was never confirmed by Guinness World Records.) Currie eventually bred an even stronger pepper—known as "Pepper X"—that took the title of "World's Hottest Pepper" on August 23, 2023 that was tested indicating an average rating of 2.69 million SHUs.

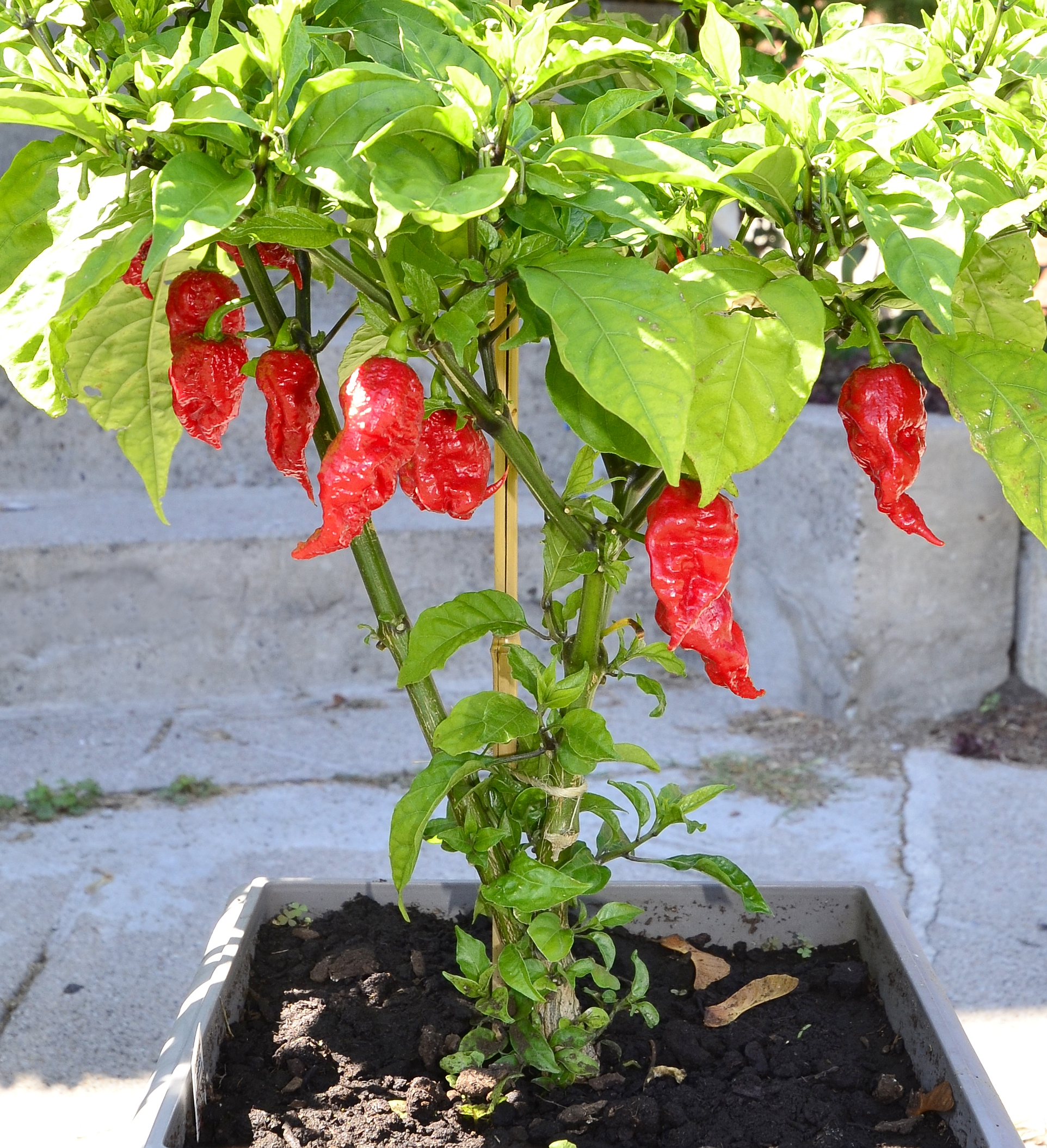
Mature plant

=== Pungency ===
The Reaper has been described as having a fruity taste, with the initial bite being sweet and then immediately turning to "molten lava." The sensory heat or pungency detected when eating a Carolina Reaper derives from the density of capsaicinoids, particularly capsaicin, which relates directly to the intensity of chili pepper heat and Scoville Heat Units (SHU).

== Cultivation ==
For growing, the pepper has been described as "a good all-rounder to try at home" by James Wong, an English ethnobotanist, who stated that they require growing temperatures of at least 18 °C (64 °F). He suggested growing the plants in 30–40 cm (12–16 in) pots to restrict growth and produce fruit sooner. When fully ripe, two peppers occupy the palm of the hand.

== See also ==
- One Chip Challenge
