= Chili pepper =

Varieties of pepper of the genus Capsicum

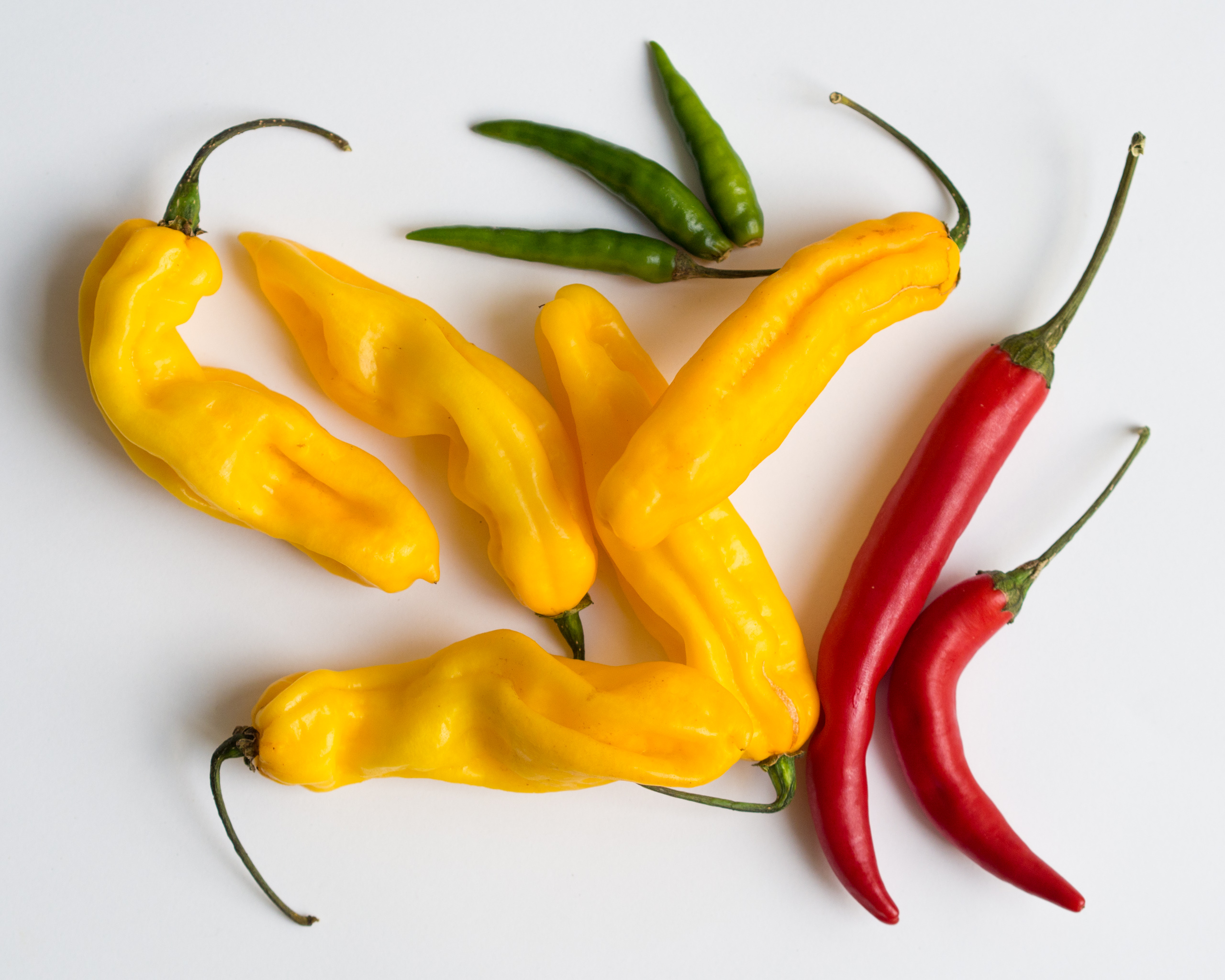
Chili peppers of varied colours and sizes: green bird's eye, yellow Madame Jeanette, red cayenne

Chili peppers, also spelled chile or chilli (from Classical Nahuatl chīlli [ˈt͡ʃiːlːi]), are varieties of berry-fruit plants from the genus Capsicum, which are members of the nightshade family Solanaceae, cultivated for their pungency (spicy heat). They are used as a spice to add pungency in many cuisines. Capsaicin and the related capsaicinoids give chili peppers their intensity when ingested or applied topically. Chili peppers exhibit a range of heat and flavors. This diversity is the reason behind the availability of different types of chili powder, each offering its own taste and heat level.

Chili peppers originated in Central or South America and were first cultivated in Mexico. European explorers brought chili peppers back to the Old World in the late 15th century as part of the Columbian exchange, which led to the cultivation of multiple varieties across the world for food and traditional medicine. Five Capsicum species have been widely cultivated: annuum, baccatum, chinense, frutescens, and pubescens.

== History ==
=== Origins ===
Capsicum plants originated in modern-day Peru and Bolivia, and have been a part of human diets since about 7,500 BC. They are one of the oldest cultivated crops in the Americas. Chili peppers were cultivated in east-central Mexico some 6,000 to 9,000 years ago, and independently across different locations in the Americas including highland Peru and Bolivia, central Mexico, and the Amazon. They were among the first self-pollinating crops cultivated in those areas.

Peru has the highest diversity of cultivated Capsicum; it is a center of diversification where varieties of all five domesticates were introduced, grown, and consumed in pre-Columbian times. The largest diversity of wild Capsicum peppers is consumed in Bolivia. Bolivian consumers distinguish two basic forms: ulupicas, species with small round fruits including C. eximium, C. cardenasii, C. eshbaughii, and C. caballeroi landraces; and arivivis with small elongated fruits including C. baccatum var. baccatum and C. chacoense varieties.

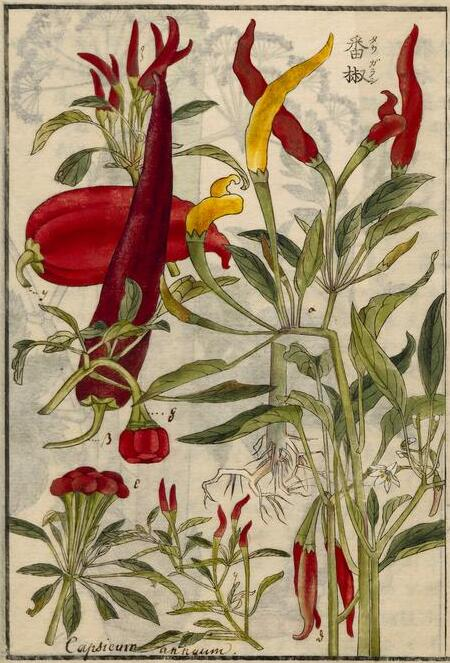
Illustration from the Japanese agricultural encyclopedia Seikei Zusetsu, 1804

=== Etymology ===
The English word is from Classical Nahuatl chīlli with the same meaning. The name of the plant is unrelated to that of the country Chile. While pepper originally meant the genus Piper, not Capsicum, the Oxford English Dictionary and Merriam-Webster record both usages. The three primary spellings are chili (common in North America), chile (Central America and parts of the US) and chilli (United Kingdom and former British colonies). The specific dish name "chili con carne" is normally written with one "l" in both American and British English.

=== Distribution to Europe ===
In 1493, Diego Álvarez Chanca accompanied Christopher Columbus on his second voyage to the West Indies. Upon returning to Spain with chili peppers, Chanca became the first European to document their medicinal uses in the Old World, publishing his observations in 1494. Columbus and his crew called the Capsicum fruits "peppers" (pimientos in Spanish) because they were pungent like black pepper (Piper nigrum). The introduction of chilies to Europe formed part of the wider interchange of plants, animals, and cultures between the New World and the Old World known as the Columbian exchange. Unlike Piper vines, which grow naturally only in the tropics, chilies could be grown in temperate climates. By the mid-1500s, they had become a common garden plant in Spain and were incorporated into numerous dishes. By 1526, they had appeared in Italy, in 1543 in Germany, and by 1569 in the Balkans, where they came to be processed into paprika.

=== Distribution to the rest of the world ===
The rapid introduction of chilies to Africa and Asia was likely through Portuguese and Spanish traders in the 16th century, though the details are unrecorded. The Portuguese introduced them first to Africa and Arabia, and then to their colonies and trading posts in Asia, including Goa, Sri Lanka, and Malacca. From there, chilies spread to neighboring regions in South Asia and western Southeast Asia via local trade and natural dispersal. Around the same time, the Spanish also introduced chilies to the Philippines, where they spread to Melanesia, Micronesia, and other Pacific Islands via their monopoly of the Manila galleons. Their spread to East Asia in the late 16th century is less clear, but was likely also through local trade or through Portuguese and Spanish trading ports in Canton, China, and Nagasaki, Japan. The earliest known mention of the chili pepper in Chinese writing dates to 1591, though the pepper is thought to have entered the country in the 1570s.

== Production ==
=== Cultivation ===
Chili peppers are the shiny, brightly coloured fruits of species of Capsicum. Botanically they are berries. The plants are small, 20 to 60 centimetres (7.9 to 23.6 in) depending on variety, making them suitable for growing in pots, greenhouses, or commercially in polytunnels. The plants are perennial, provided they are protected from cold. The fruits can be green, orange, red, or purple, and vary in shape from round and knobbly to smooth and elongated. If the fruits are picked green and unripe, more flowers develop, yielding more fruit; fruits left on the plant can become hotter in taste, and acquire their ripe coloration, at the price of a reduced harvest.

Ideal growing conditions for peppers include a sunny position with warm, loamy soil, ideally 21 to 29 °C (70 to 84 °F), that is moist but not waterlogged. The seeds germinate only when warm, close to 21 °C (70 °F). The plants prefer warm conditions, but can tolerate temperatures down to 12 °C (54 °F); and are sensitive to cold. The flowers can self-pollinate. However, at extremely high temperatures, 30 to 38 °C (86 to 100 °F), pollen loses viability, and its flowers are much less likely to result in fruit. For flowering, Capsicum is a non-photoperiod-sensitive crop.

Chilies are vulnerable to pests including aphids, glasshouse red spider mite, and glasshouse whitefly, all of which feed on plant sap. Common diseases include grey mould caused by Botrytis cinerea; this rots the tissues and produces a brownish-grey mould on the surface.

Cultivation

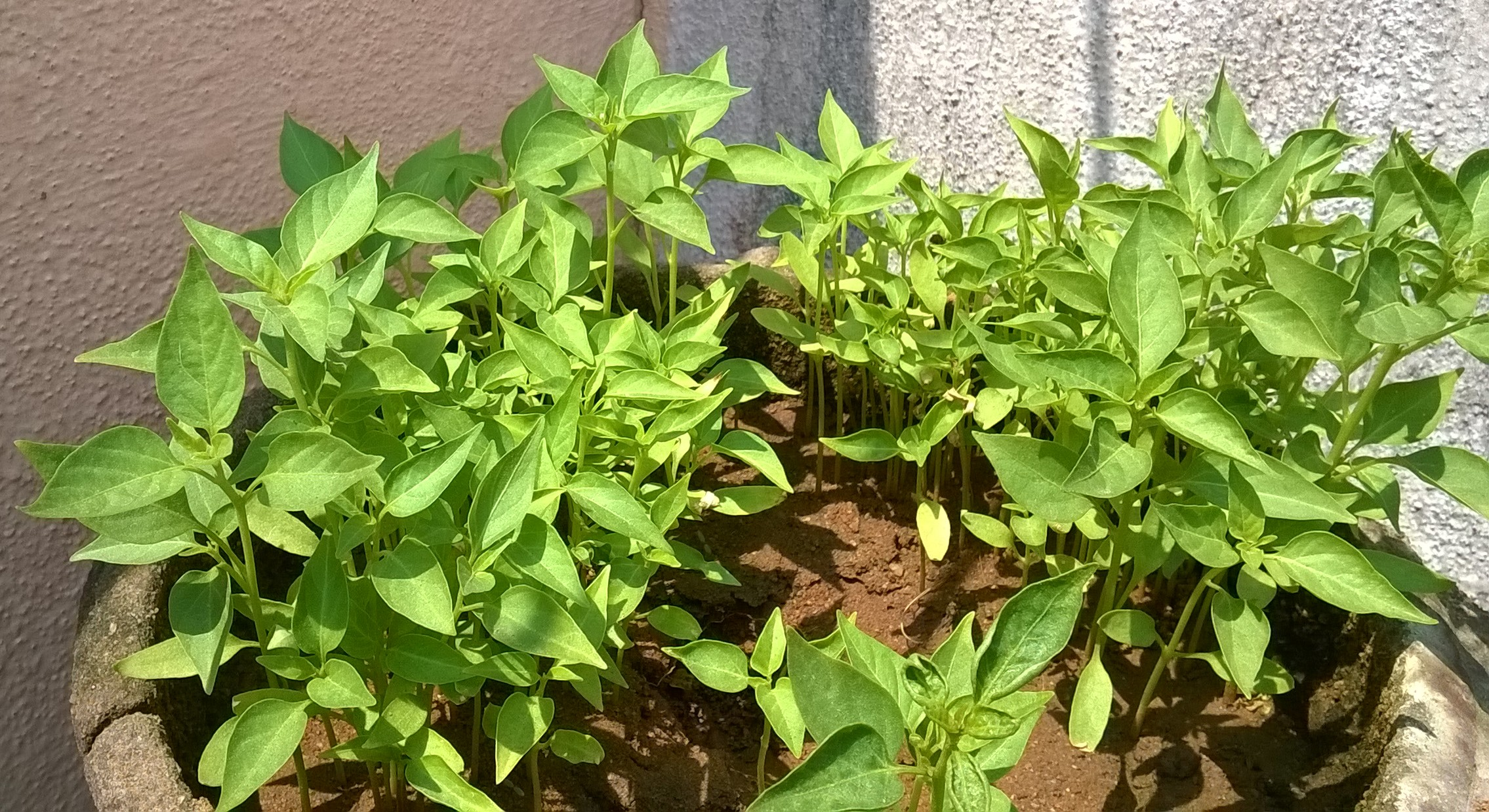
Young plants

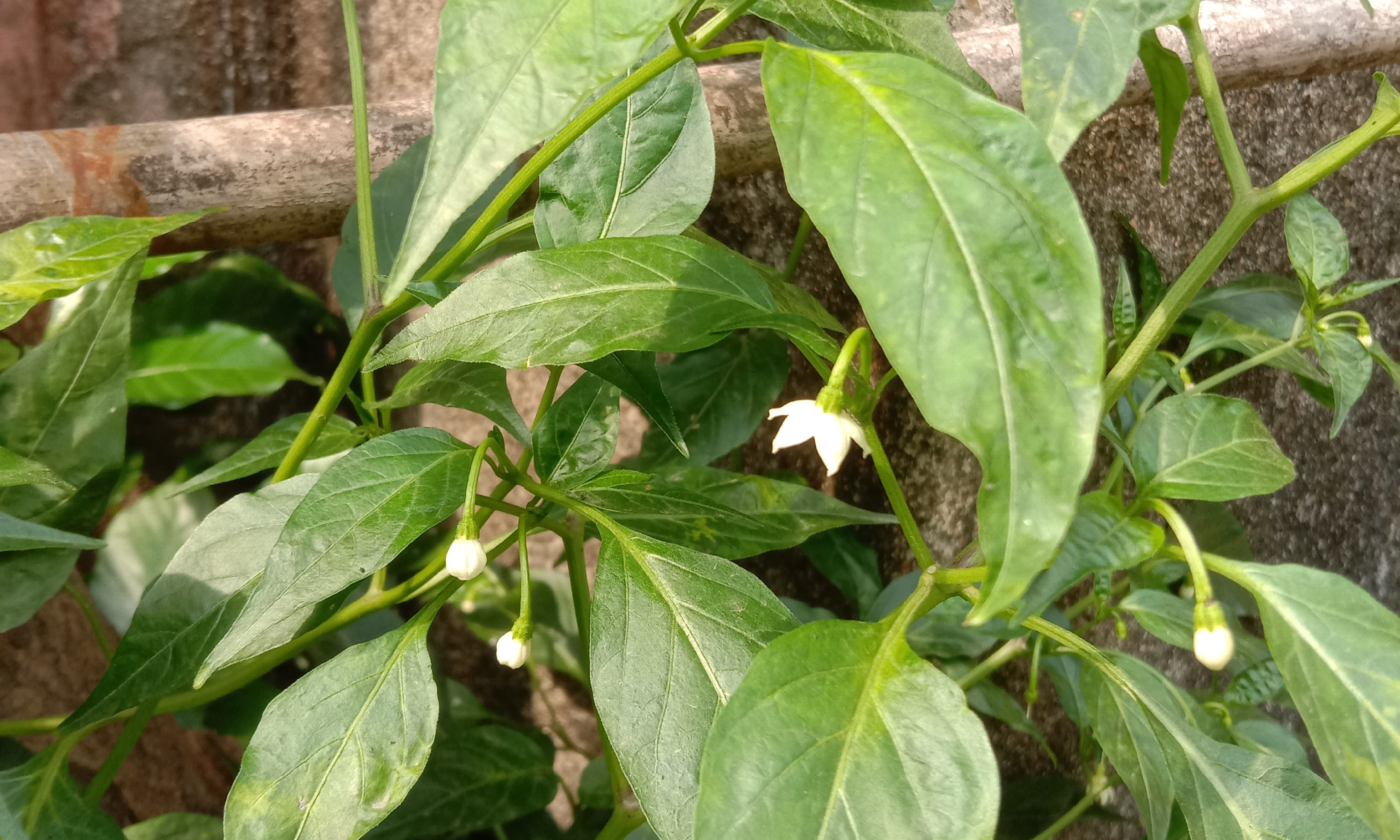
Buds and flowers

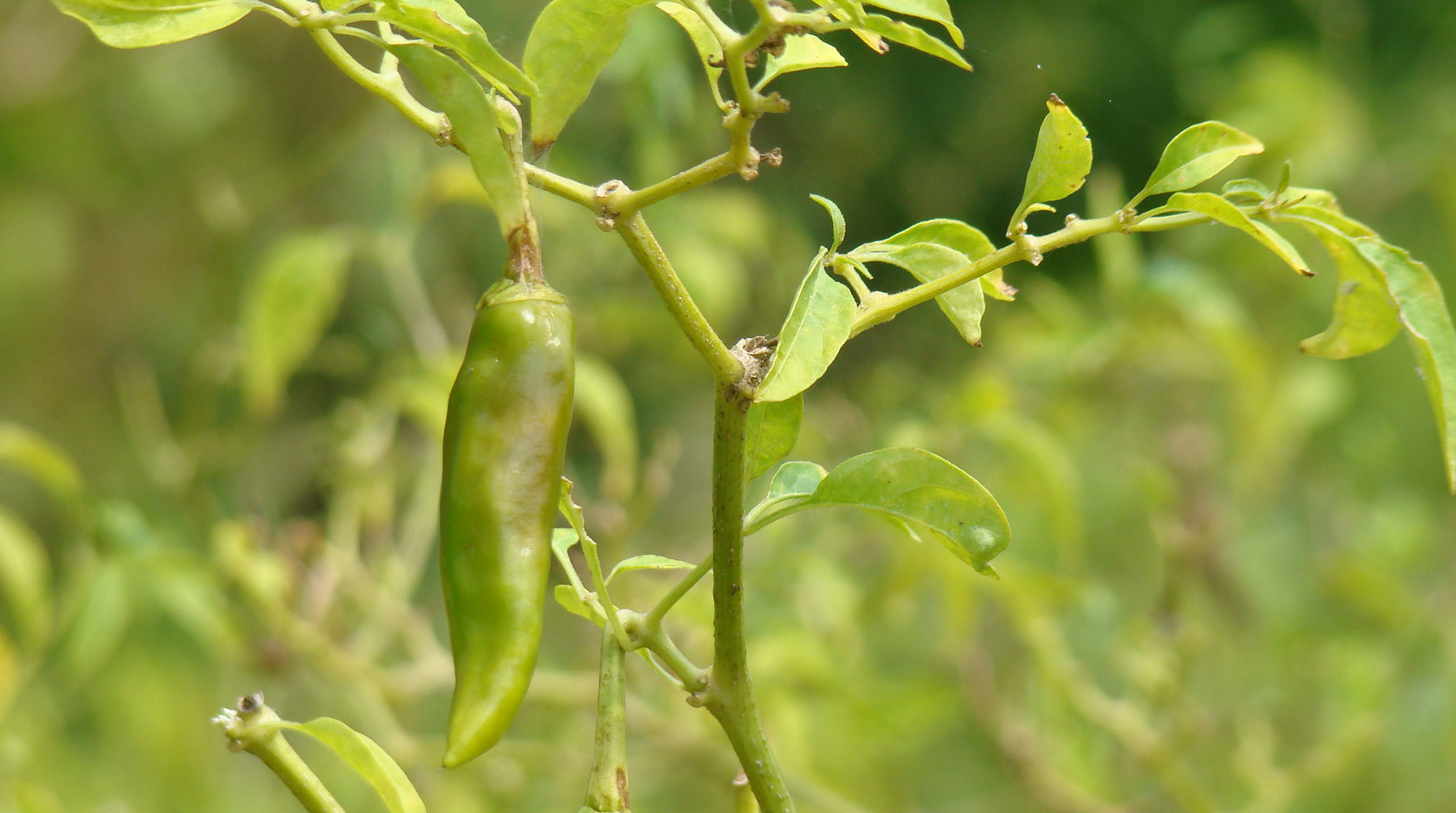
Immature chilies in the field

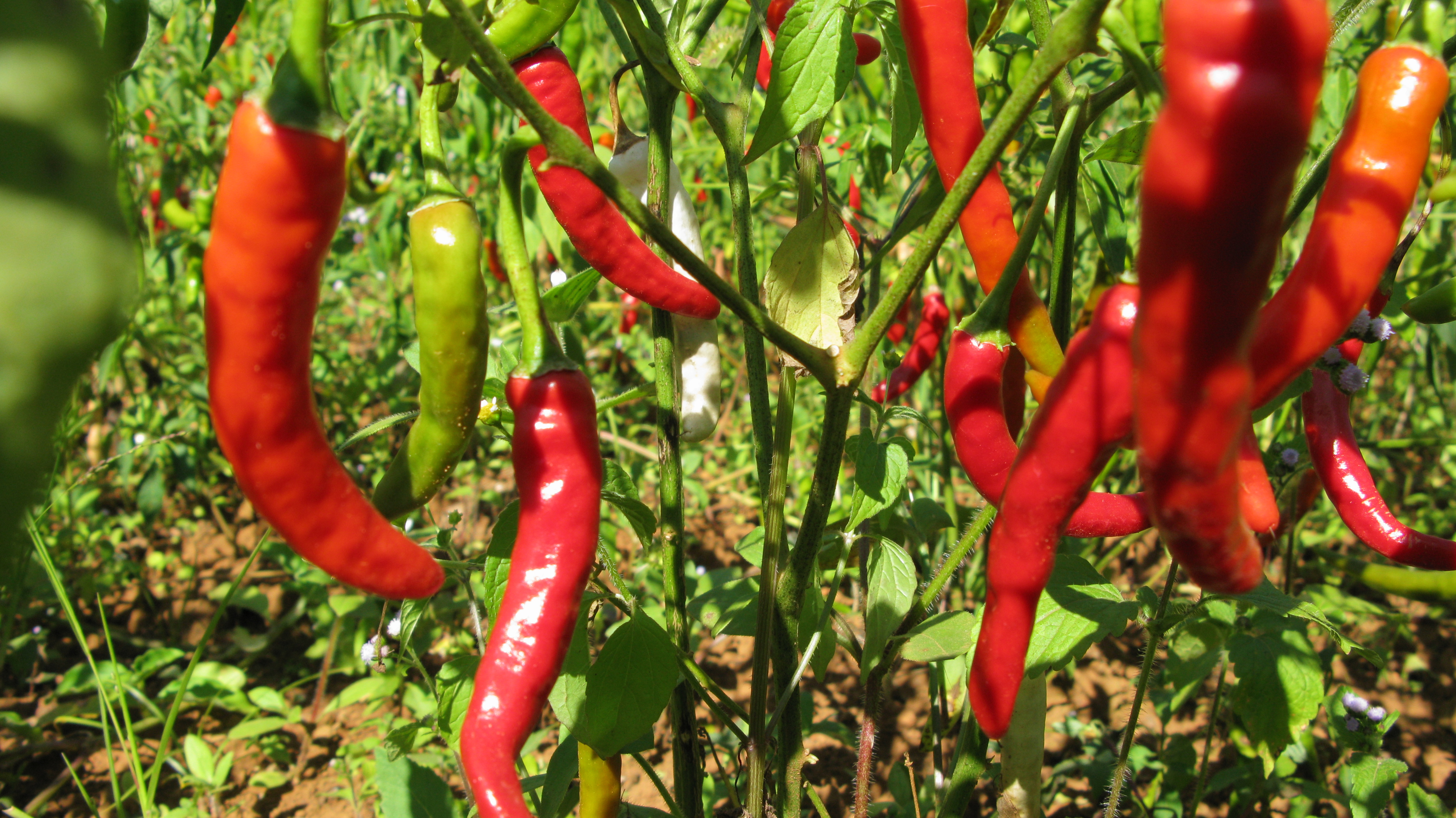
Ripe chilies in the field, Myanmar

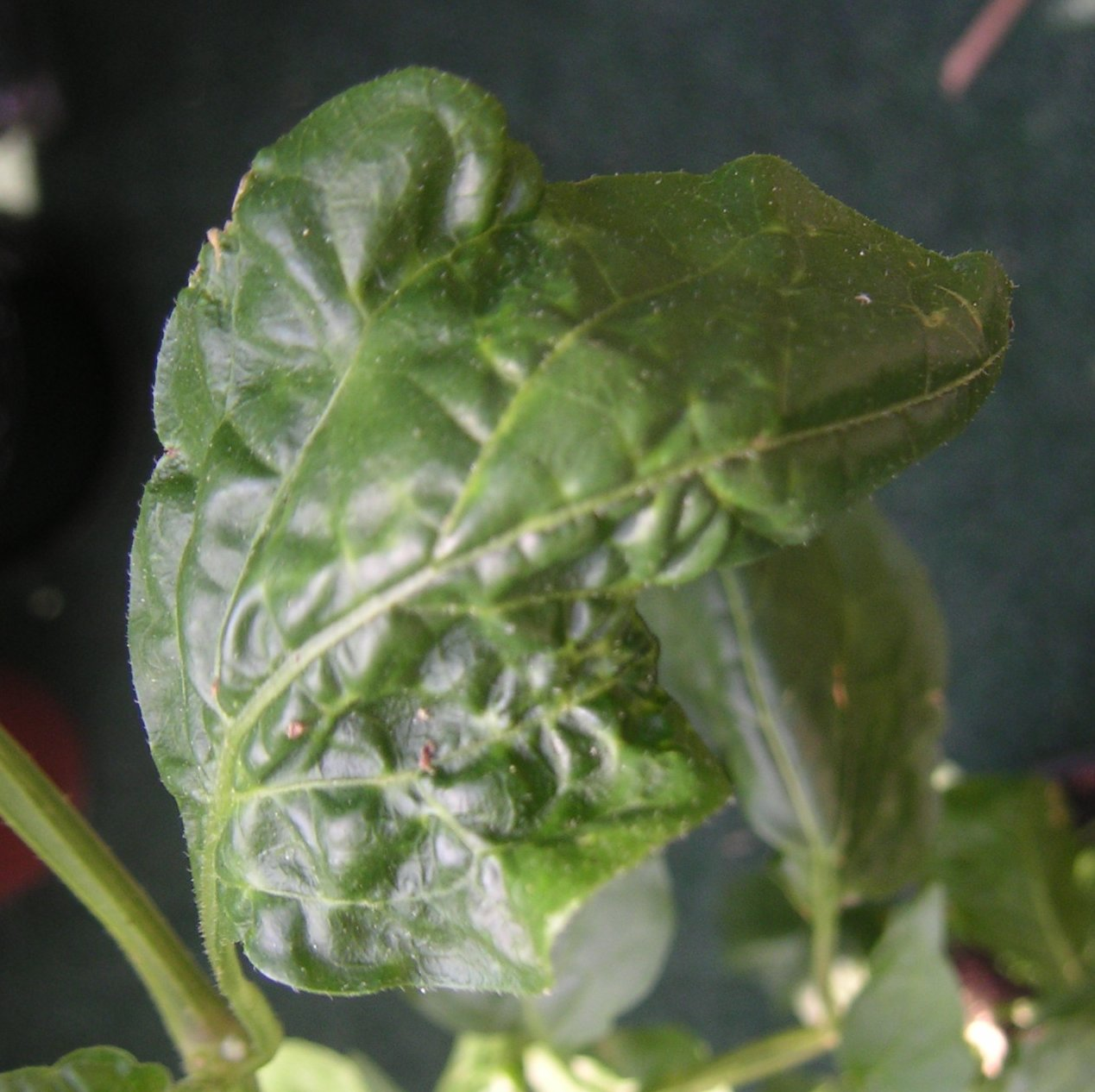
Leaf damaged by aphids

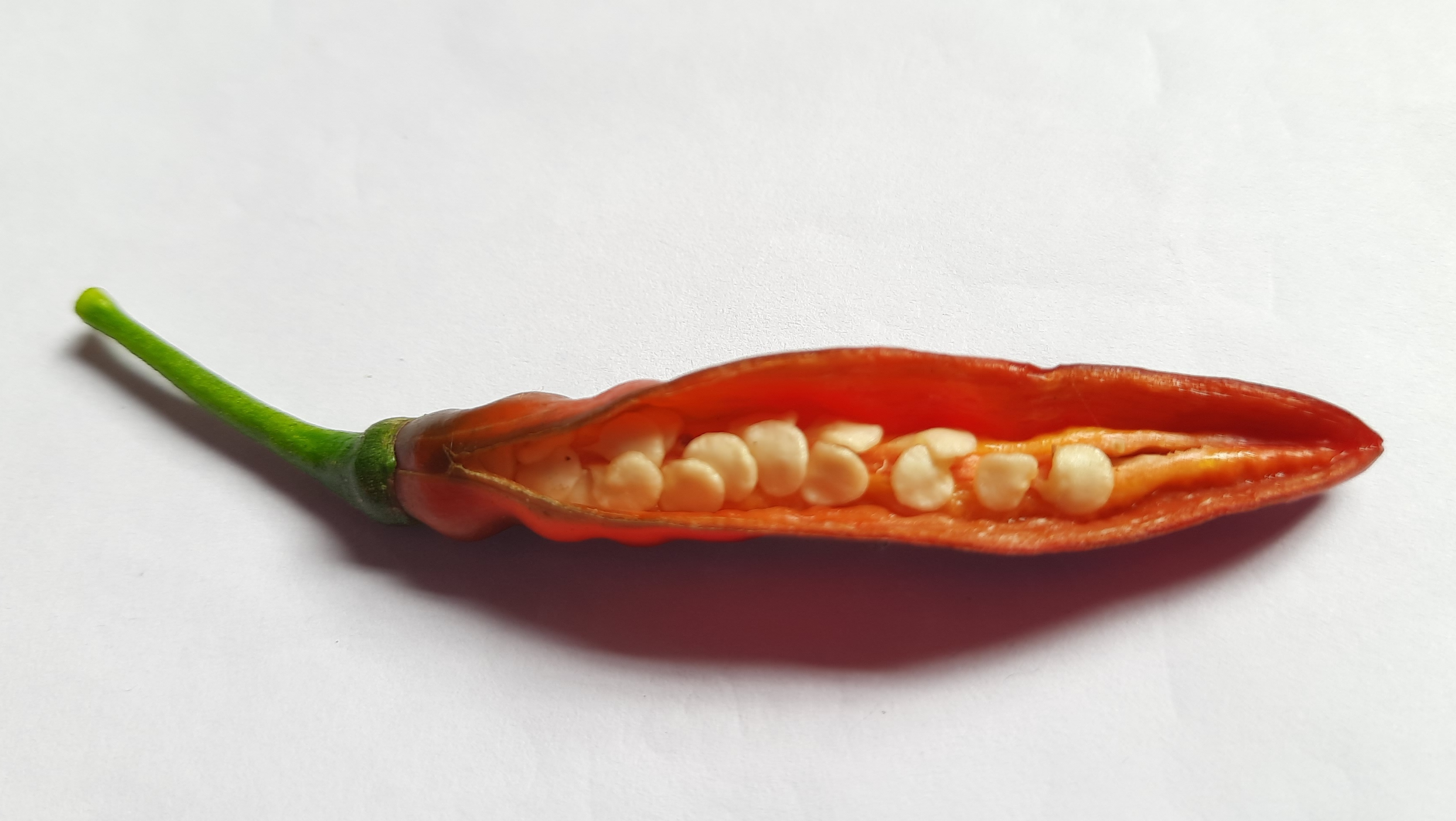
Ripe chili pepper with seeds

=== Preparation ===
Harvested chilies may be used fresh, or dried, typically on the ground in hot countries, to make a variety of products. Drying enables chilies grown in temperate regions to be used in winter. For home use, chilies can be dried by threading them with cotton and hanging them up in a warm dry place to dry.

Drying chilies

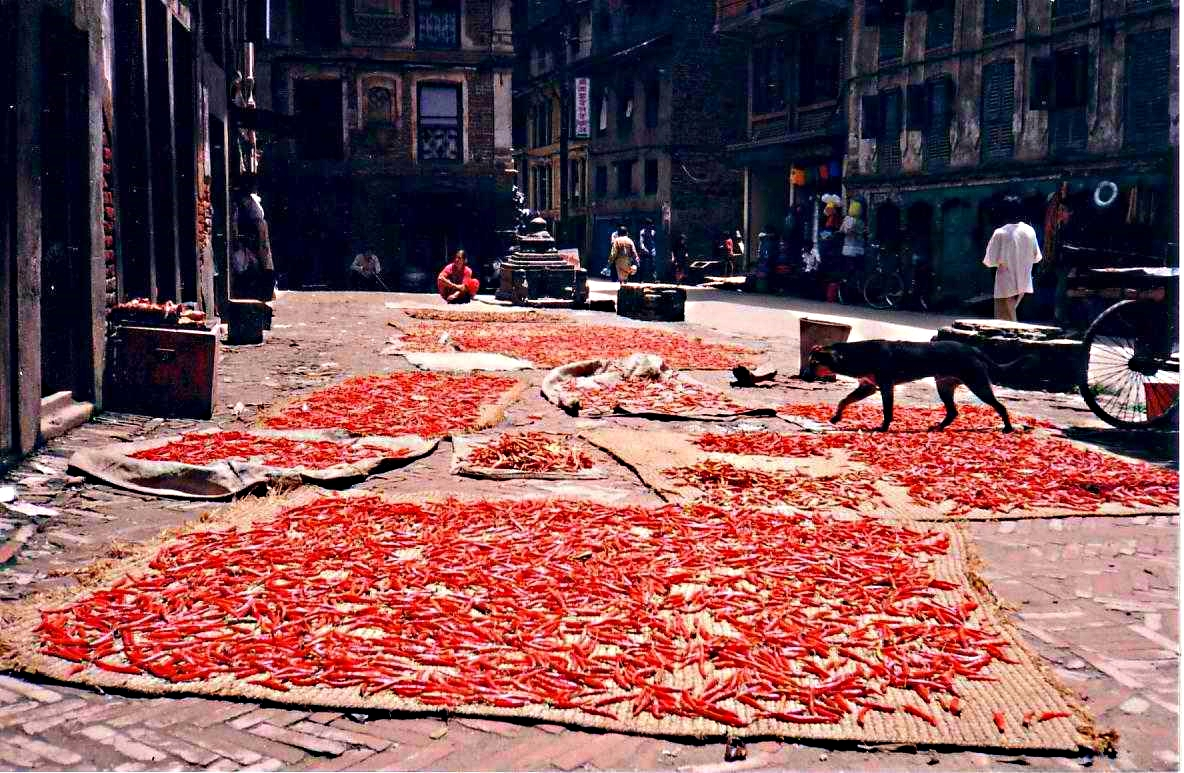
Chili peppers drying in Kathmandu, Nepal

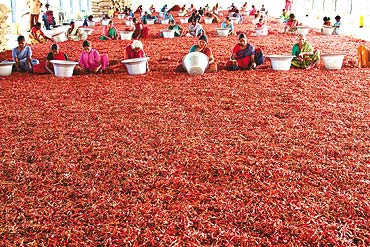
Guntur chilli drying in the sun, Andhra Pradesh, India

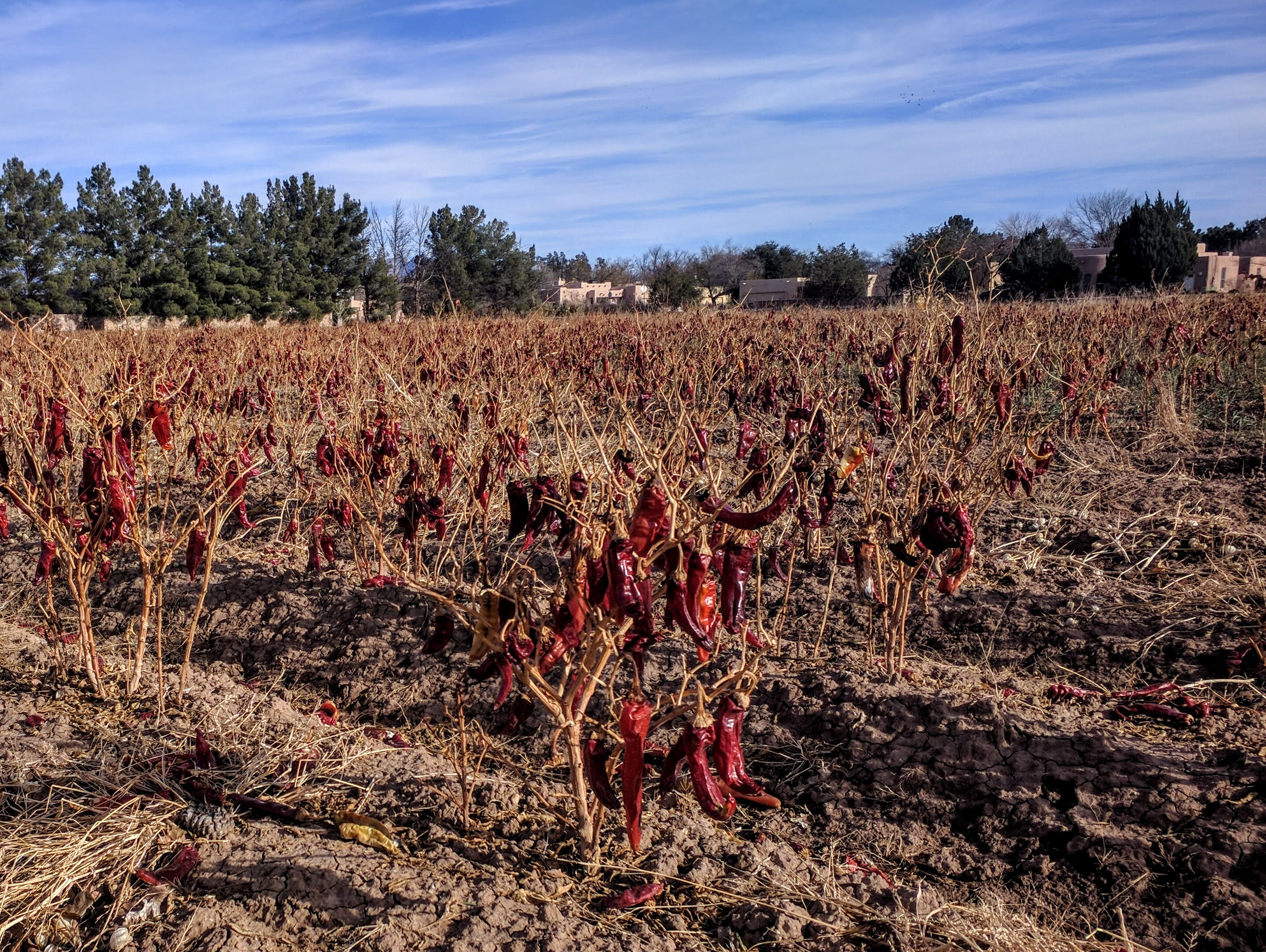
New Mexico chiles dried on the plant in Mesilla, New Mexico
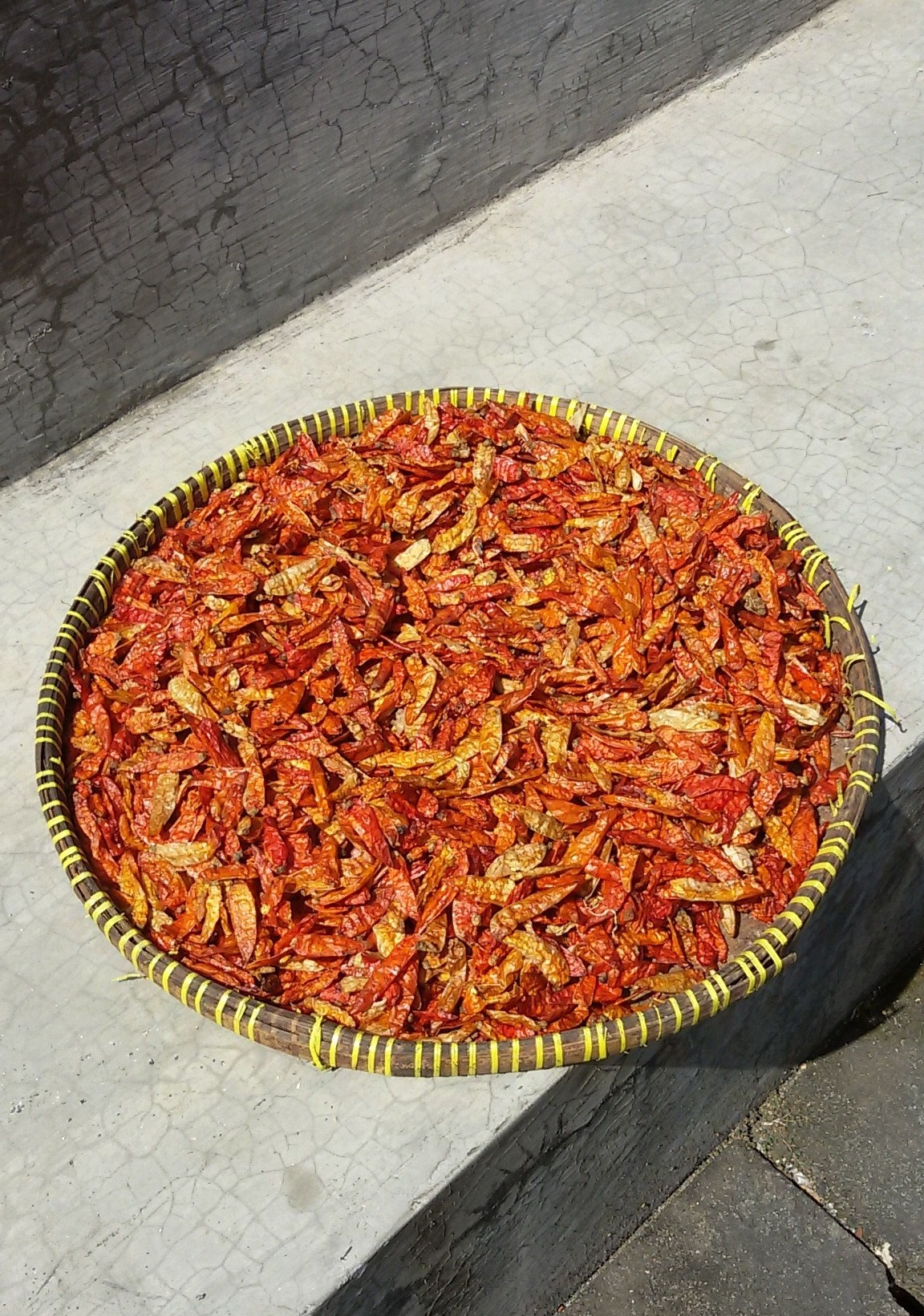
Sundried chili at Imogiri, Yogyakarta, Indonesia

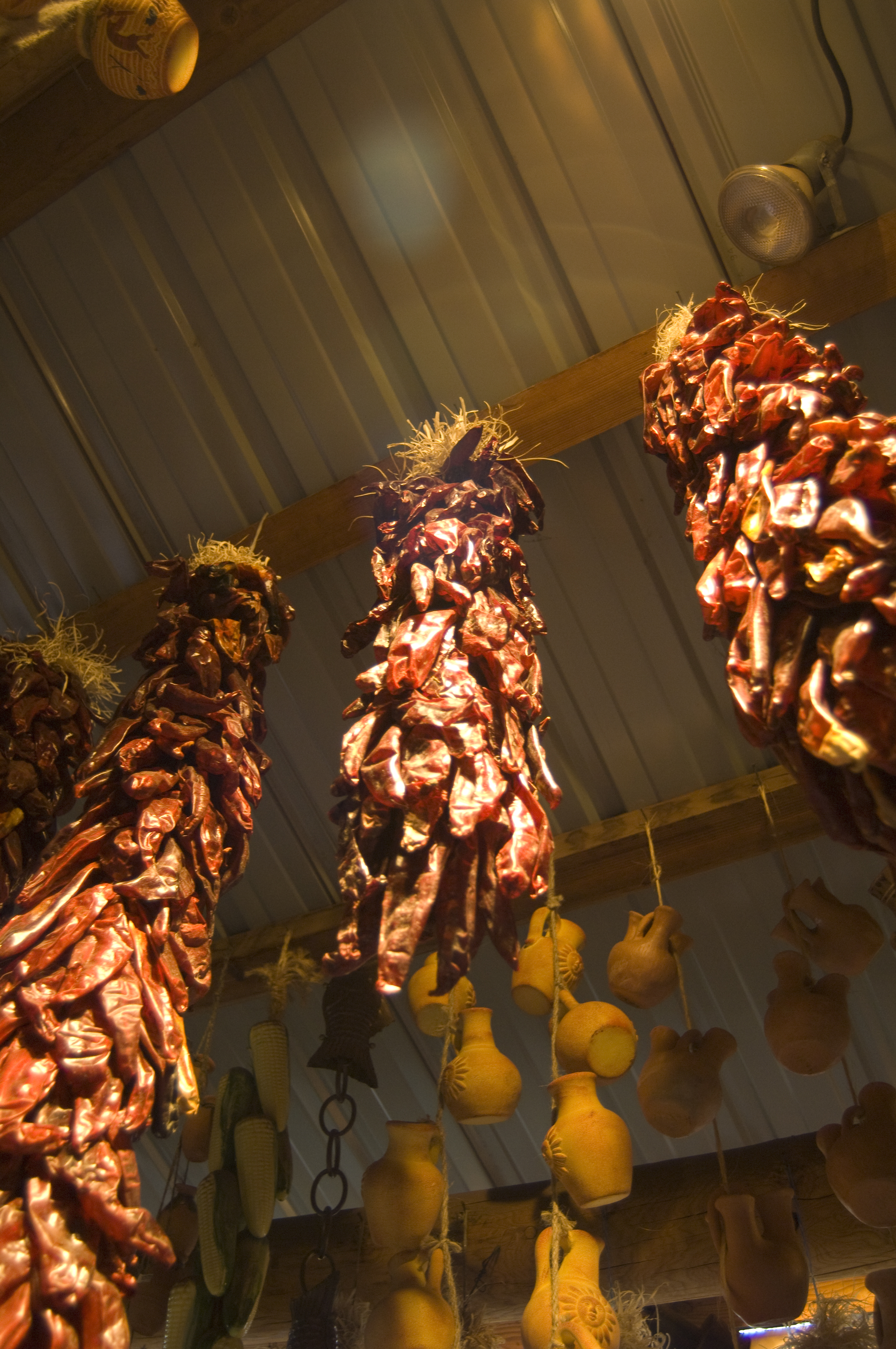
Ristras of chili peppers drying in Arizona

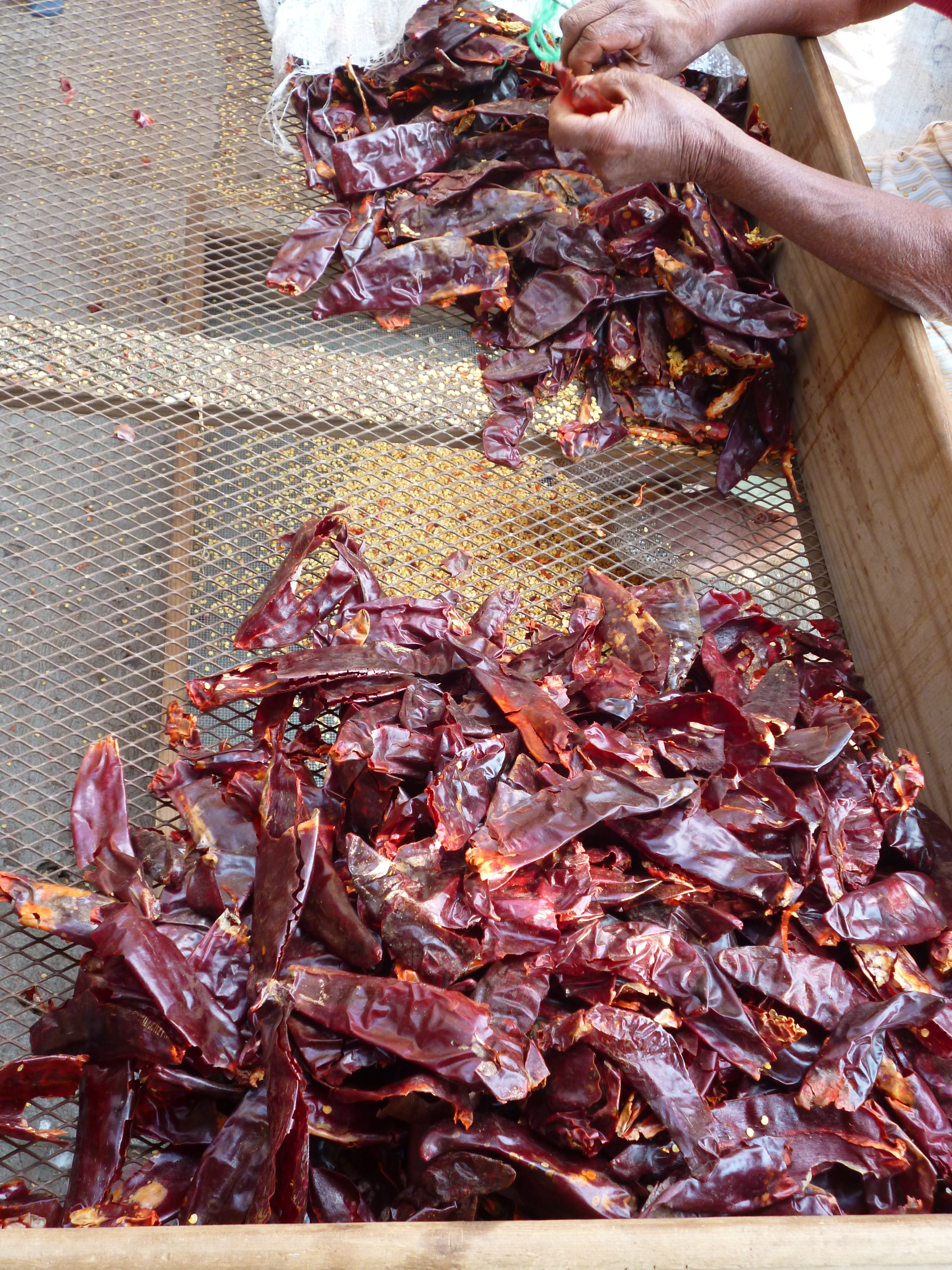
Removing seeds and pith from dried chilies in San Pedro Atocpan, Mexico

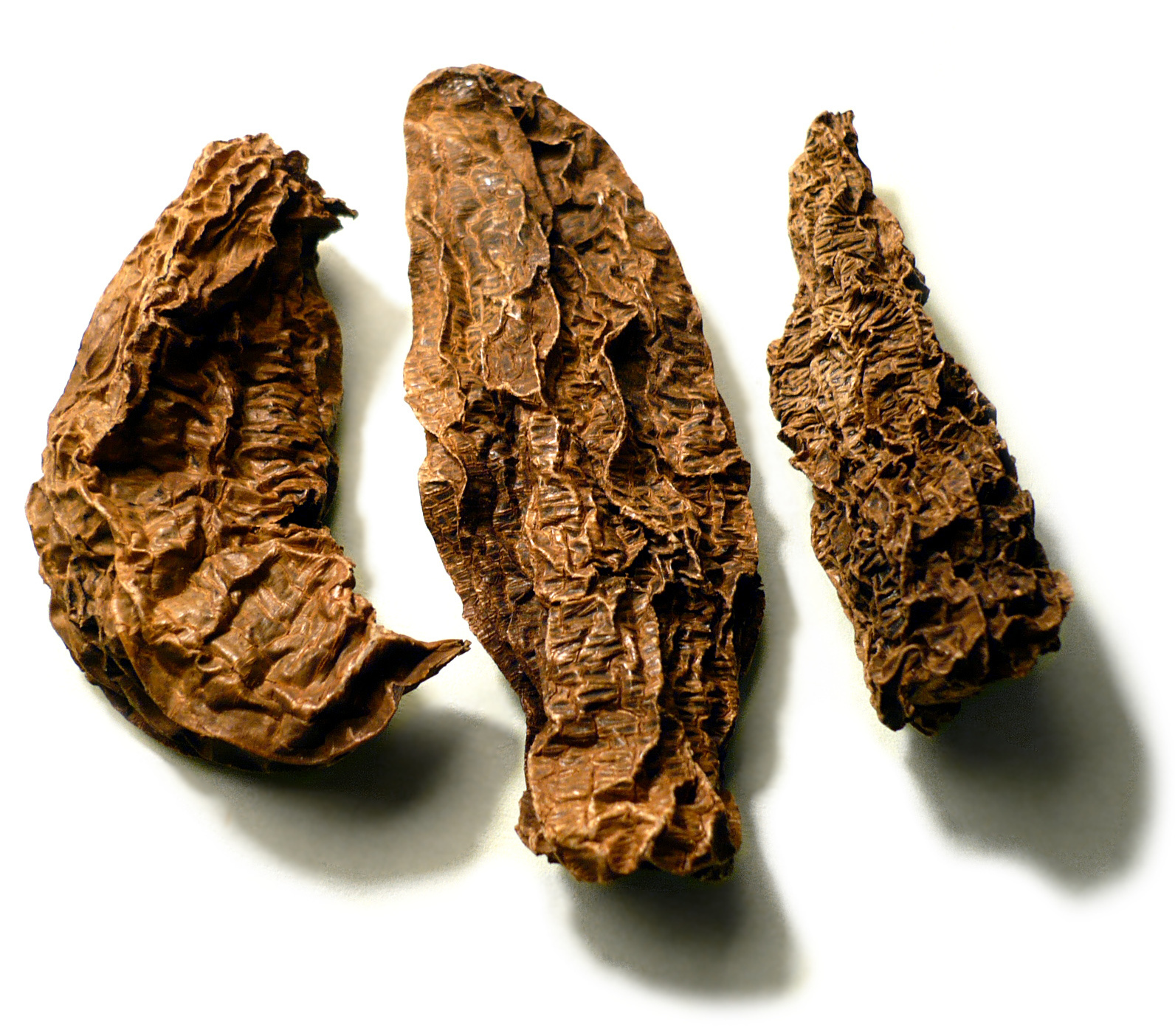
Smoke-dried chipotle

Products include whole dried chilies, chili flakes, and chili powder, Fresh or dried chilies are used to make hot sauce, a liquid condiment—usually bottled for commercial use—that adds spice to other dishes. Dried chilies are used to make chili oil, cooking oil infused with chili.

Products

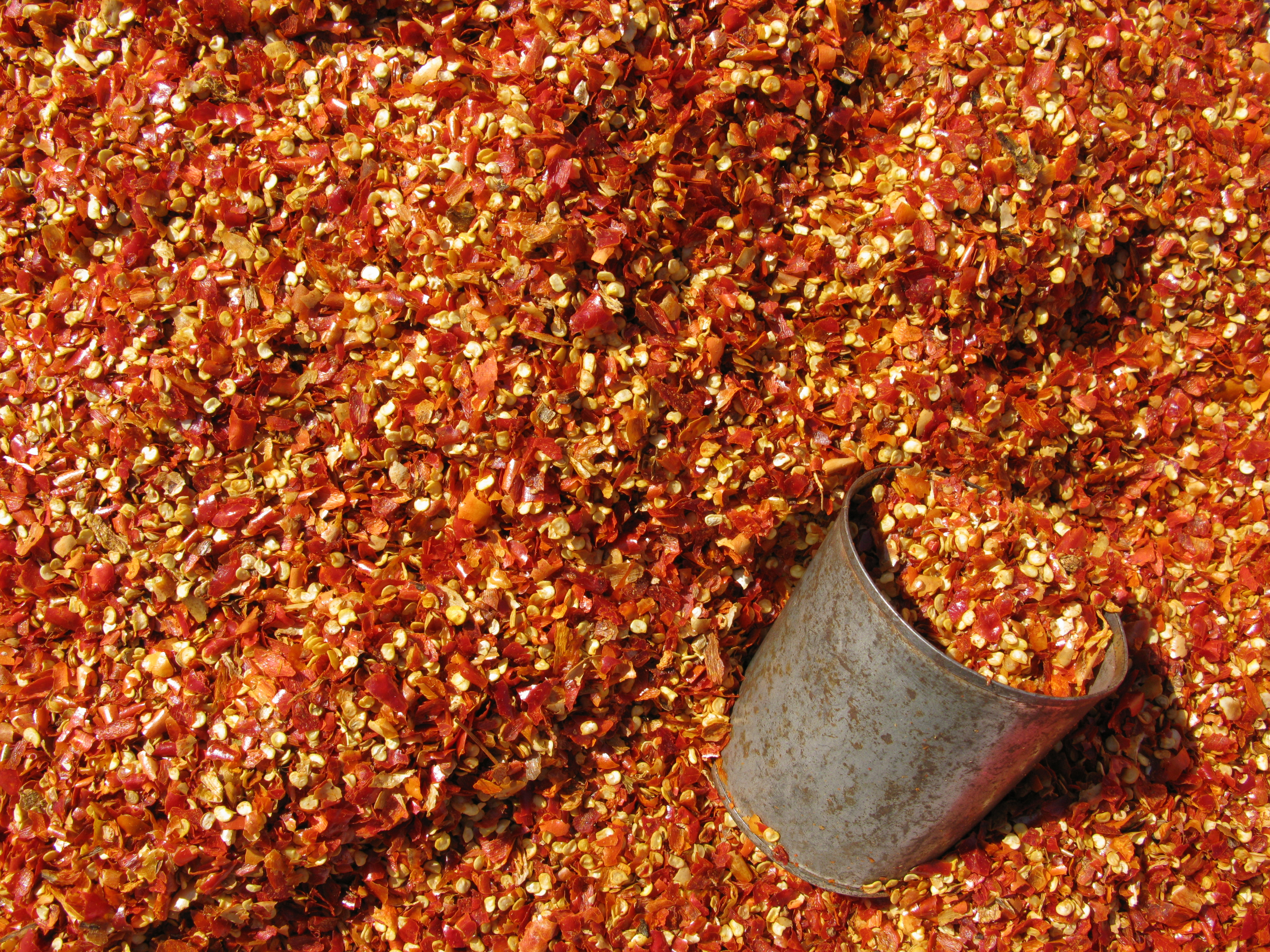
Dried chili pepper flakes, Myanmar

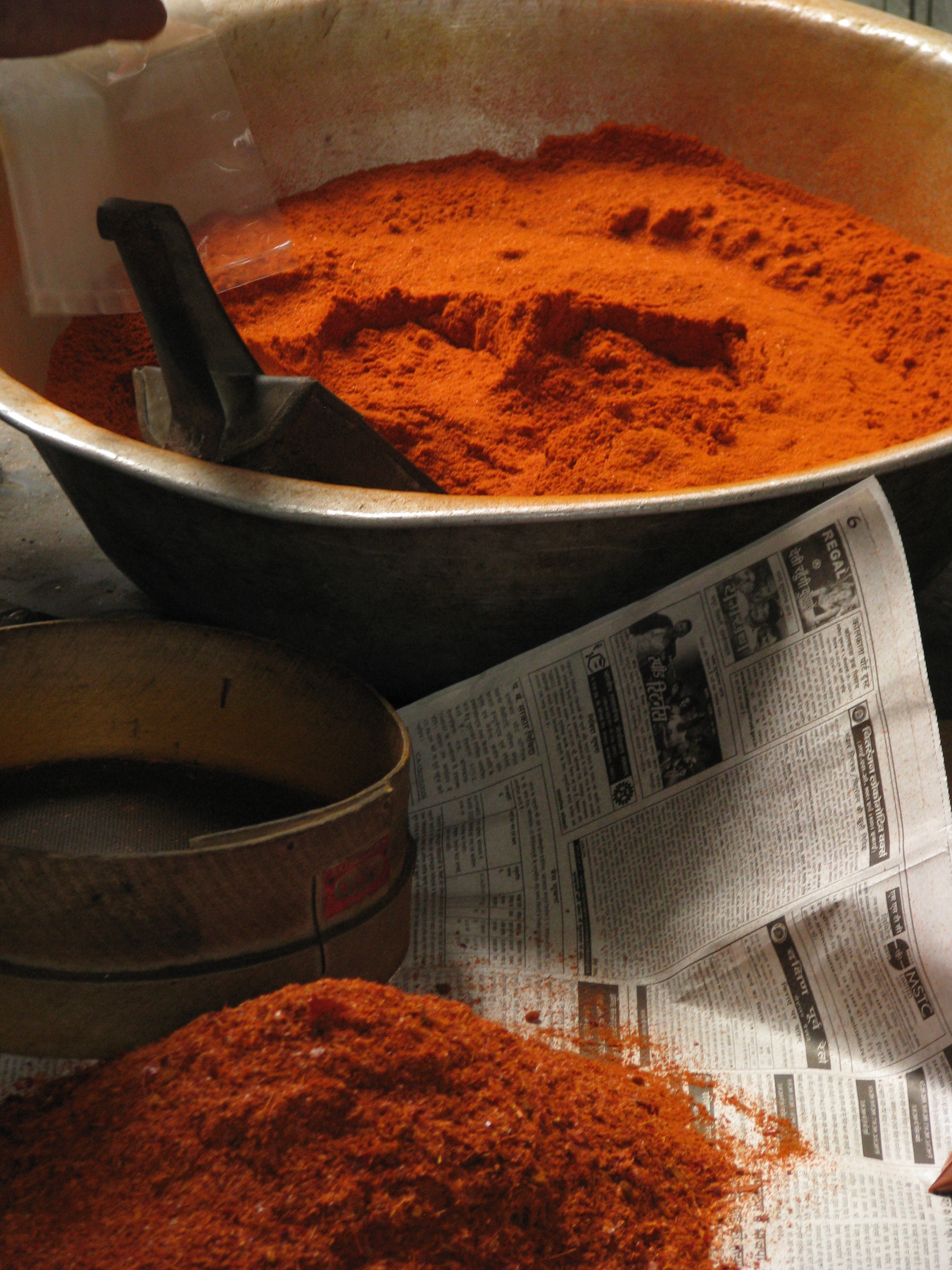
Chili powder, India

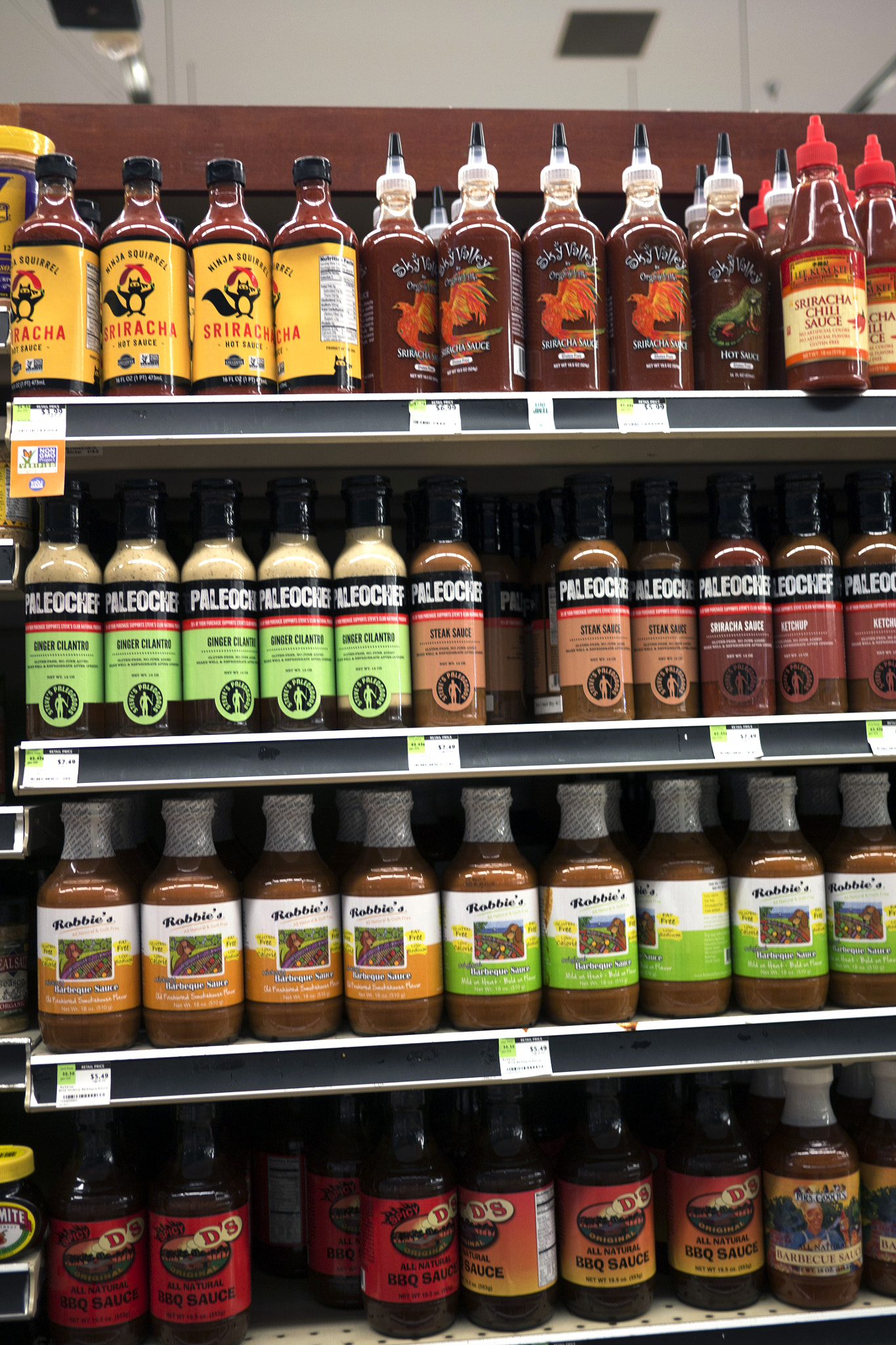
Brands of hot sauce, California

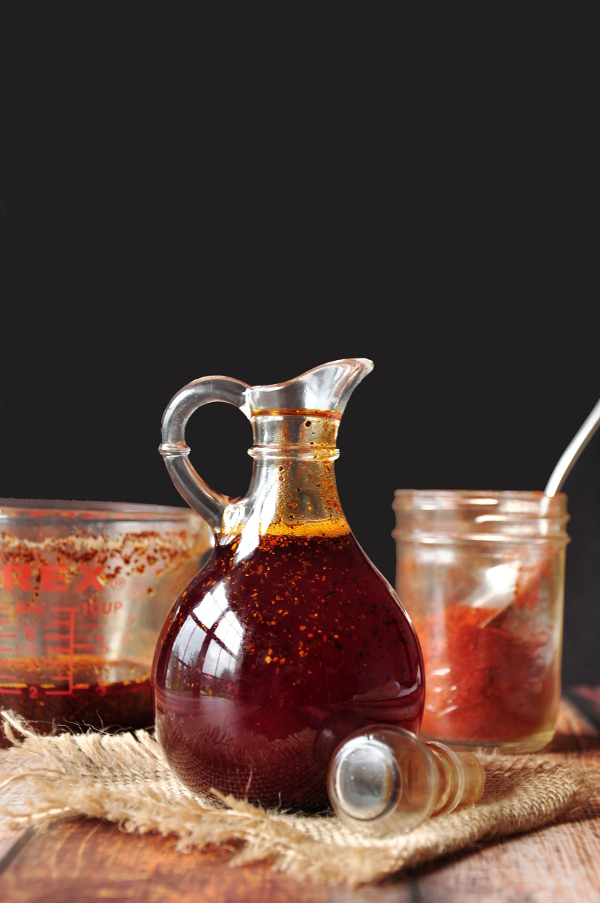
Chili oil

=== Production ===
Green chili peppers 2024, millions of tonnes
China	17.3
India	5.3
Turkey	3.4
Mexico	3.2
Indonesia	3.0
Spain	1.5
Egypt	1.1
World	44.8
Source: FAOSTAT of the United Nations

In 2024, world production of green chillies and peppers (as any Capsicum or Pimenta fruits) was 45 million tonnes, with China accounting for 39% of the total and India with 12% (table). Global production of dry chillies and peppers in 2024 was 5.5 million tonnes, led by China, Thailand, and Bangladesh, each accounting for over 300,000 tonnes.

Production of chillies and peppers

Chilies and peppers yield

=== Species and cultivars ===
Species of Capsicum that produce chili peppers are shown on the simplified phylogenetic tree, with examples of cultivars: The World Vegetable Center has one of the largest collection of chili peppers in the world. It has researched climate change resistant cultivars.

- Capsicum
  - - - - - C. annuum: bell peppers, wax, cayenne, jalapeño, Thai, chiltepin, New Mexico chile
          - - C. frutescens: tabasco, malagueta, labuyo, piri piri, kambuzi
            - C. chinense: hottest peppers, e.g. naga, habanero, datil, Scotch bonnet
        - C. baccatum: aji
      - C. pubescens: rocoto, chile de caballo
    - C. eximium (Note: C. eximium is used as a spice in Bolivia.)
  - C. lycianthoides

Cultivars

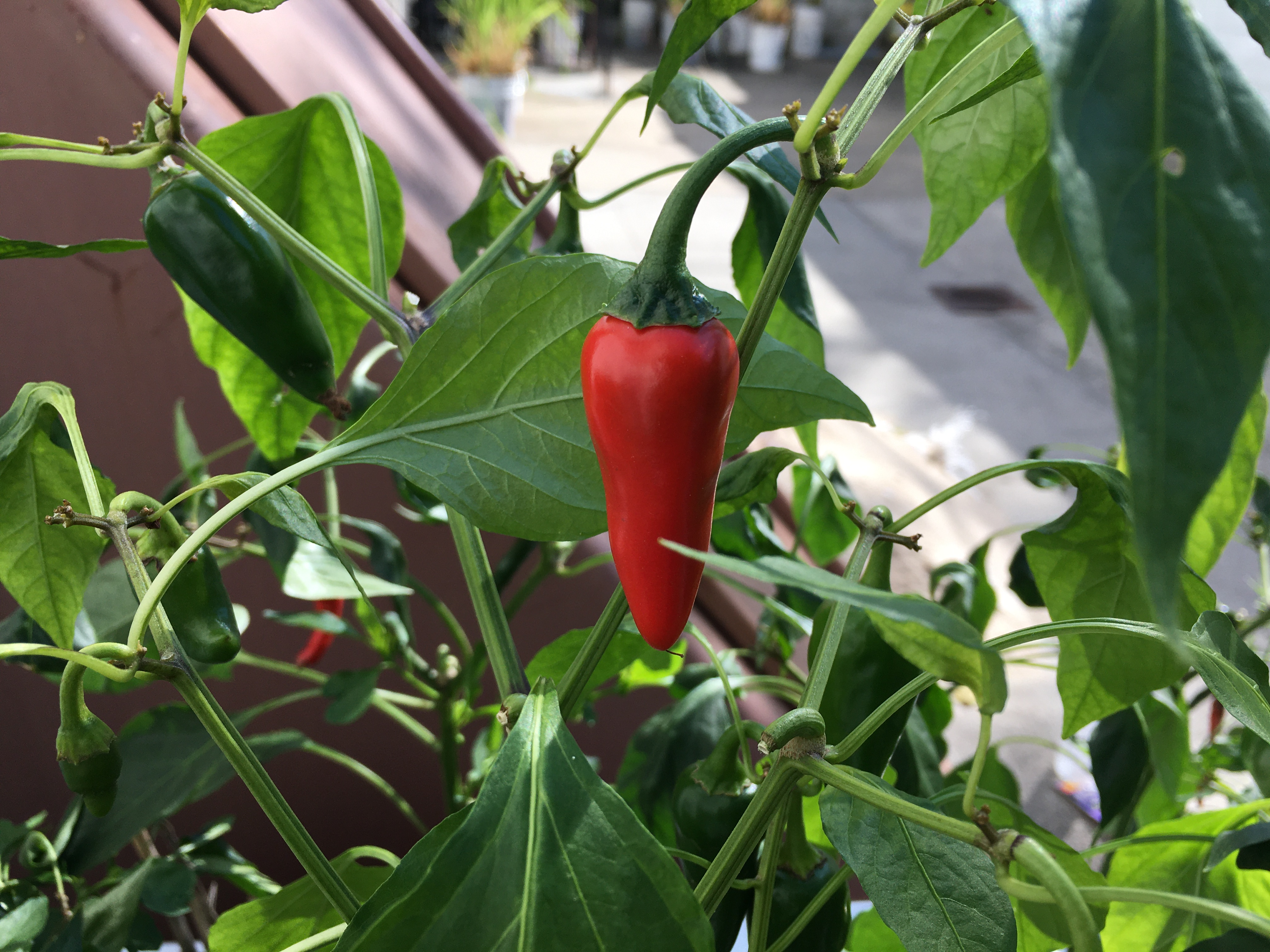
Cayenne peppers, a cultivar of Capsicum annuum

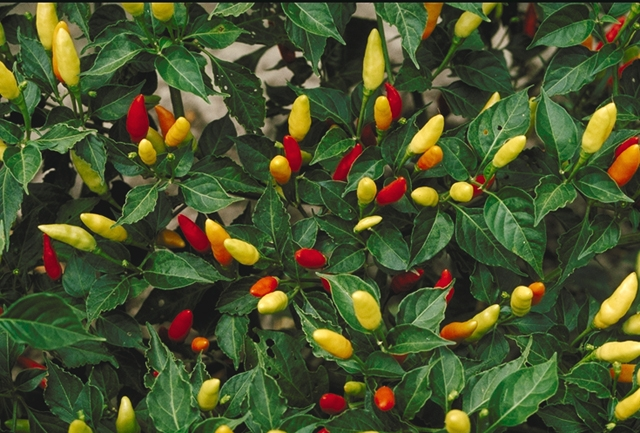
Tabasco peppers, a cultivar of Capsicum frutescens, fruits pointing upwards

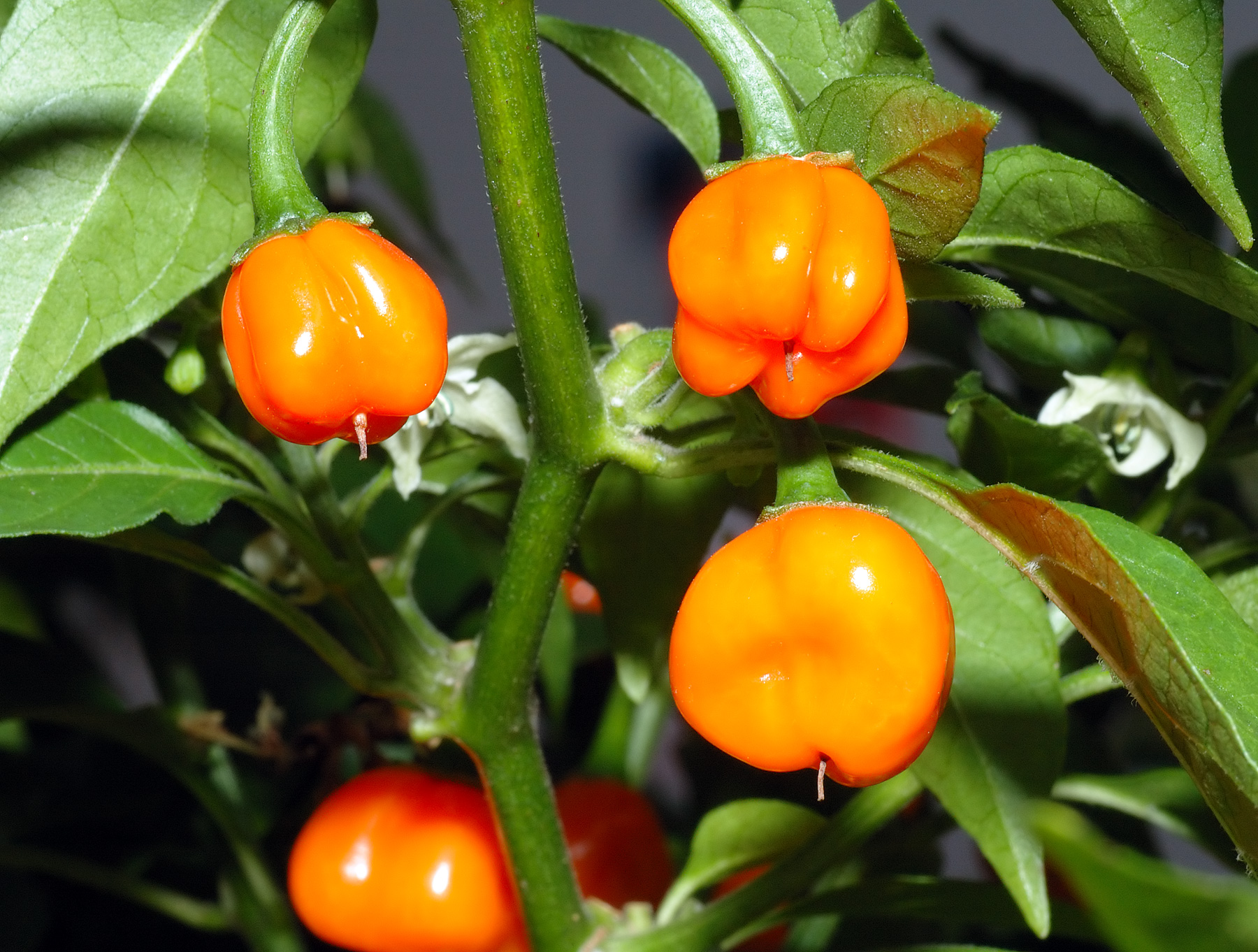
Habanero peppers, a cultivar of Capsicum chinense

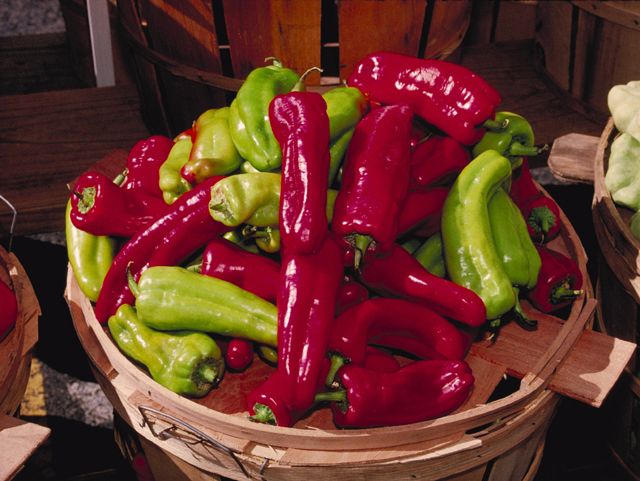
Cubanelle peppers,
United States

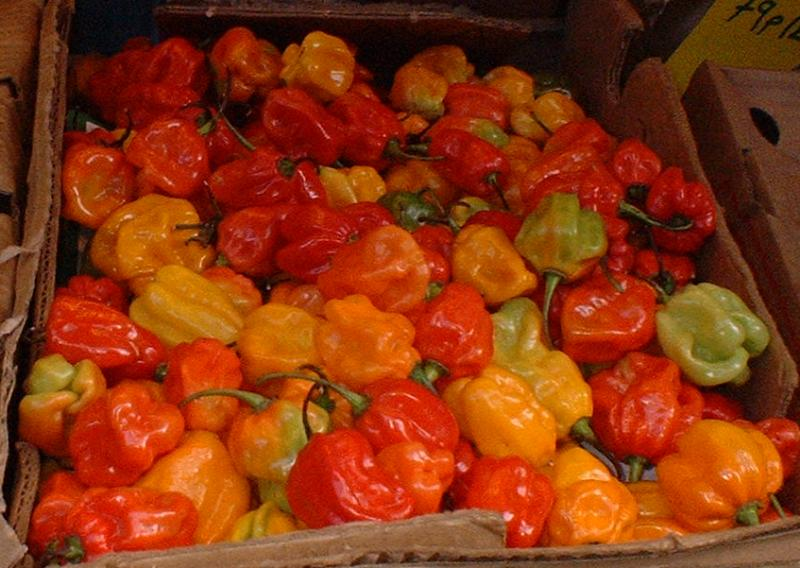
Scotch bonnets,
Caribbean

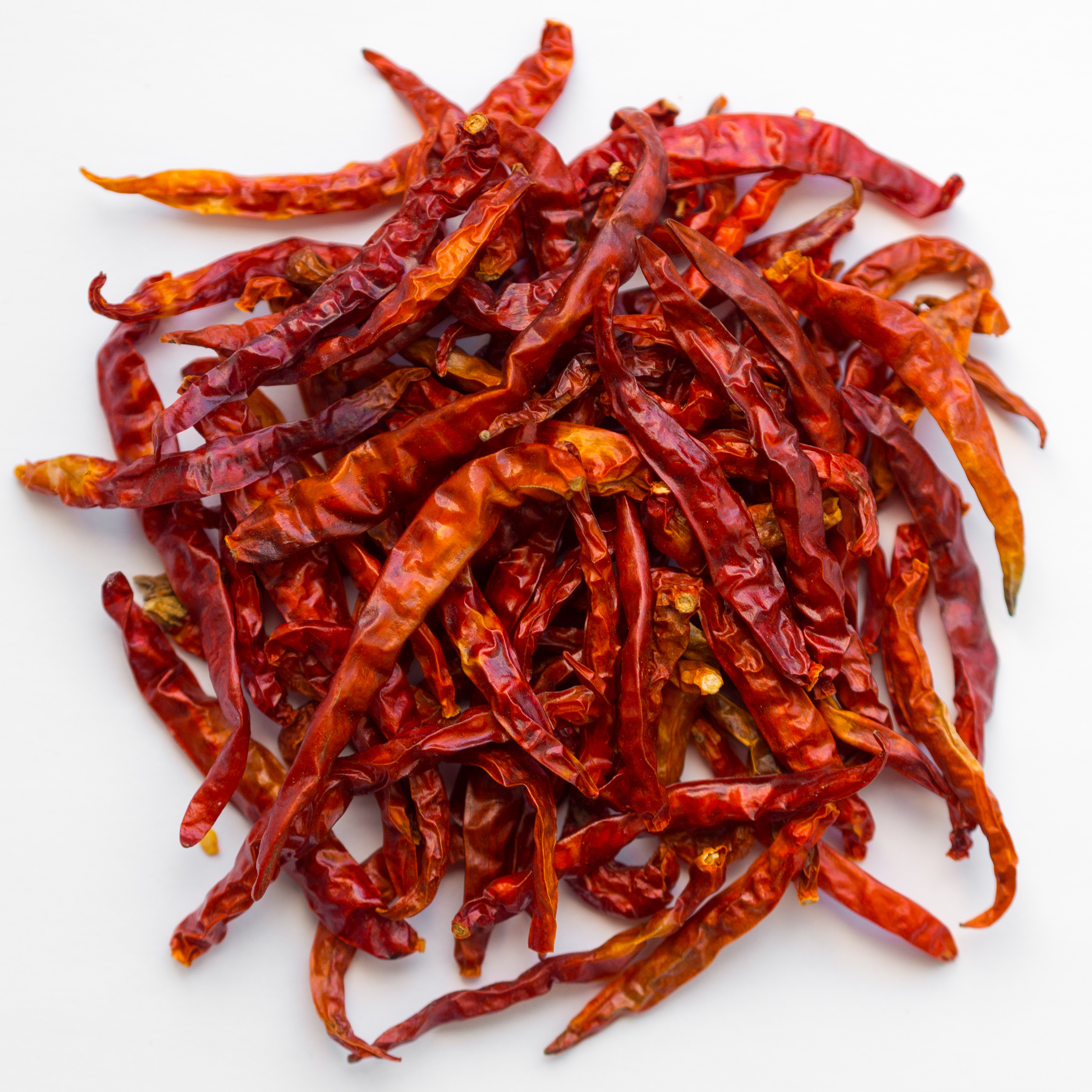
Bird's eye chilies,
Thailand

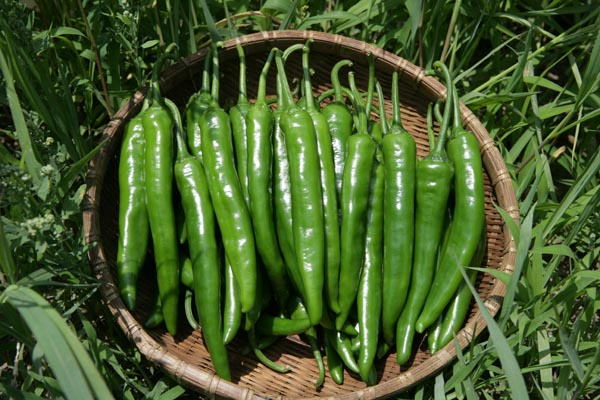
Cheongyang peppers,
South Korea
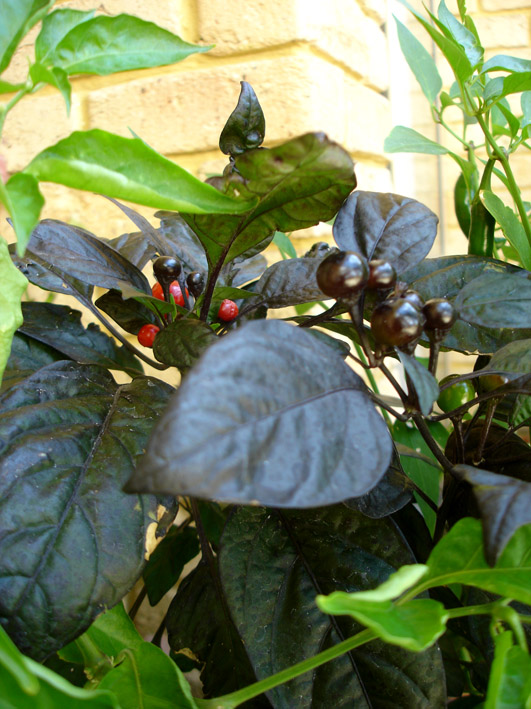
Black Pearl cultivar of C. annuum

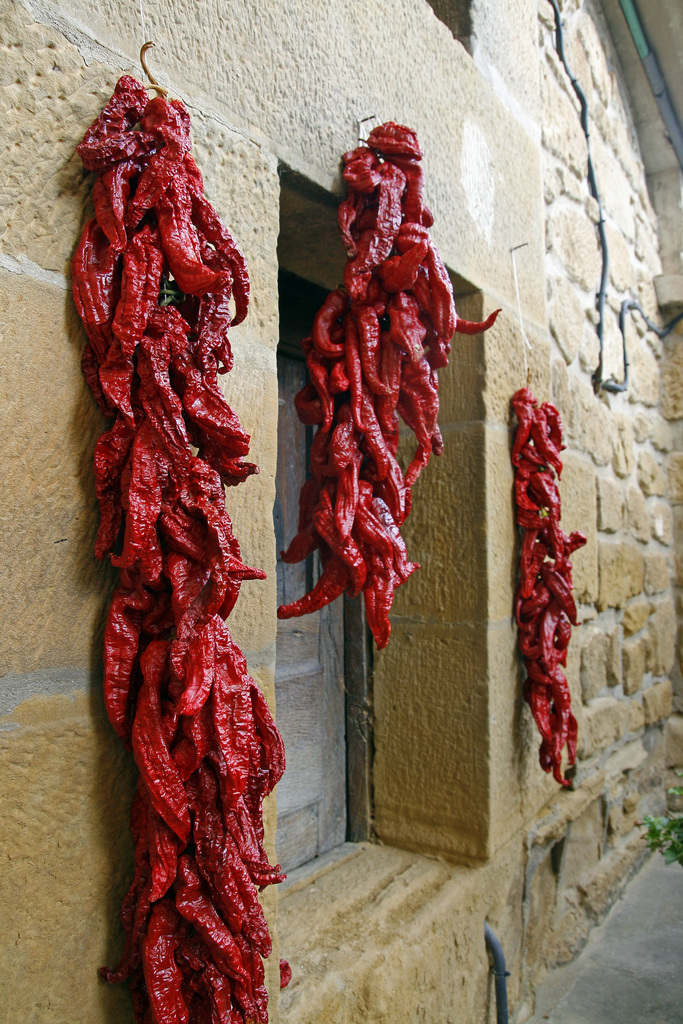
Choricero,
Spain

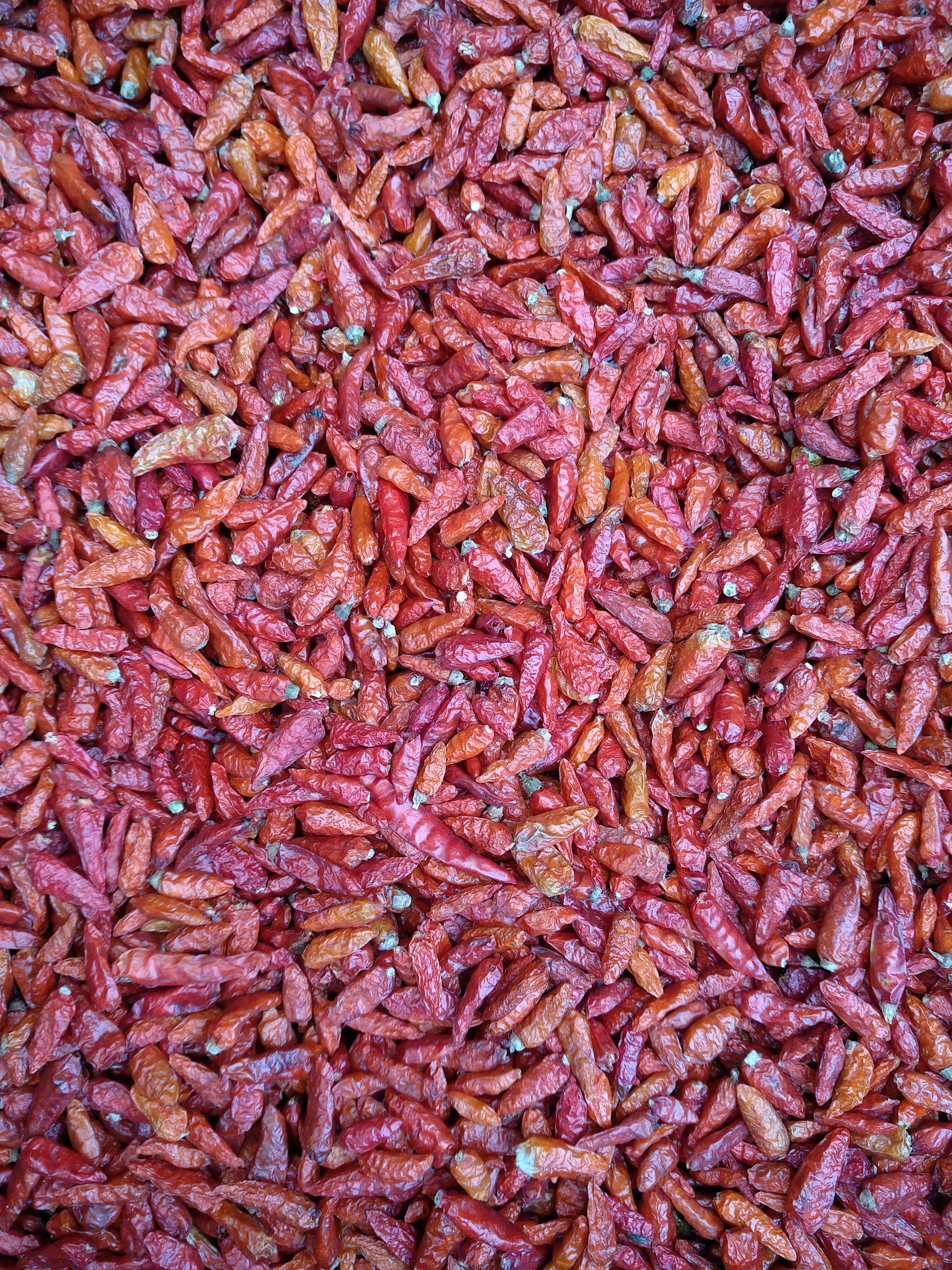
Purple chilies,
Myanmar

== Intensity ==
=== Capsaicin ===
Chemical structure

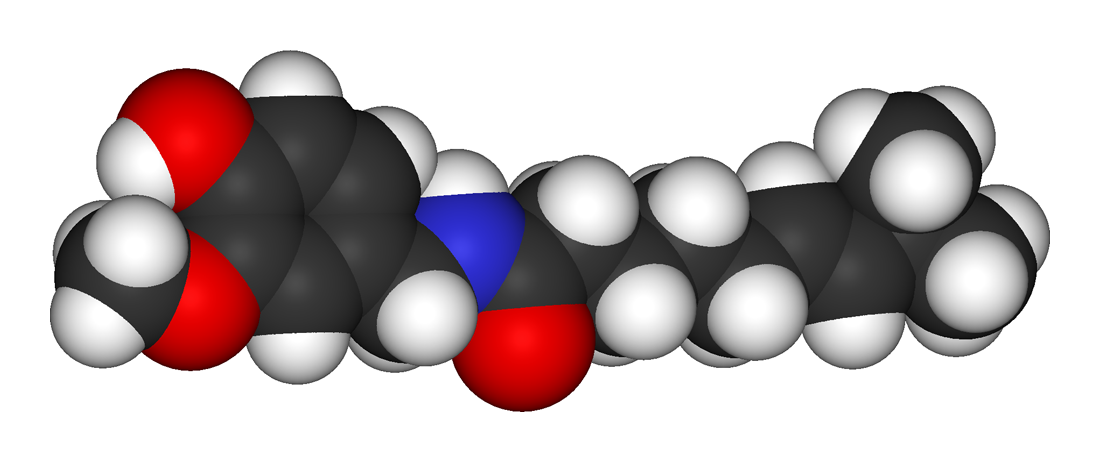
Space-filling model

Capsaicin, the principal molecule that gives chili its heat

The substances that give chili peppers their pungency (spicy heat) when ingested or applied topically are capsaicin (8-methyl-N-vanillyl-6-nonenamide) and several related chemicals, collectively called capsaicinoids. Pure capsaicin is a hydrophobic, colorless, odorless, and crystalline-to-waxy solid at room temperature. The quantity of capsaicin varies by variety, and depends on growing conditions. Water-stressed peppers usually produce stronger fruits. When a habanero plant is stressed, for example by shortage of water, the concentration of capsaicin increases in some parts of the fruit.

When peppers are consumed by mammals such as humans, capsaicin binds with pain receptors in the mouth and throat, potentially evoking pain via spinal relays to the brainstem and thalamus where heat and discomfort are perceived. However, birds are unable to perceive the hotness and so they can eat some of the hottest peppers. The intensity of the "heat" of chili peppers is commonly reported in Scoville heat units (SHU), invented by American pharmacist Wilbur Scoville in 1912. Historically, it was a measure of the dilution of an amount of chili extract added to sugar syrup before its heat becomes undetectable to a panel of tasters; the more it has to be diluted to be undetectable, the more powerful the variety, and therefore the higher the rating. Since the 1980s, spice heat has been assessed quantitatively by high-performance liquid chromatography (HPLC), which measures the concentration of heat-producing capsaicinoids, typically with capsaicin content as the main measure.

Capsaicin is produced by the plant as a defense against mammalian predators. A study suggests that by protecting against attack by a hemipteran bug, the risk of disease caused by a Fusarium fungus carried by the insects is reduced. As evidence, the study notes that peppers increased the quantity of capsaicin in proportion to the damage caused by fungi on the plant's seeds.

=== Intensity range of commonly used cultivars ===
A wide range of intensity is found in commonly used peppers:

Bell pepper	0 SHU
Fresno, jalapeño	3,500–10,000 SHU
Cayenne	30,000–50,000 SHU
Piri piri, bird's eye	50,000–100,000 SHU
Habanero, Scotch bonnet	100,000–350,000 SHU

=== Hottest by country ===
The top 9 world's hottest chili peppers (by country) are:

Country	Type	Heat (SHU)
United States	Pepper X	2.69M
Wales	Dragon's Breath	2.48M
United States	Carolina Reaper	2.2M
Trinidad and Tobago	Trinidad moruga scorpion	2.0M
India	Ghost pepper (Bhut jolokia)	1.58M
Trinidad and Tobago	Trinidad Scorpion Butch T	1.46M
England	Naga Viper	1.38M
England	Armageddon	1.3M
England	Infinity chili	1.07M

=== Safety ===
The volatile oil in chili peppers may cause skin irritation, requiring hand washing and care when touching the eyes or any sensitive body parts. Consuming hot peppers may cause stomach pain, hyperventilation, sweating, vomiting, and symptoms possibly requiring hospitalization.

Unscrupulous traders have illegally added at least eight different synthetic dyes, including Auramine O, Chrysoidine, Sudan stains I to IV, Para red, and Rhodamine B to chili products. All these chemicals are harmful. They can be detected by liquid chromatography used together with mass spectrometry.

== As food ==
=== Nutritional value ===
Peppers, hot chili, red, raw
Nutritional value per 100 g (3.5 oz)
- Energy: 166 kJ (40 kcal)
- Carbohydrates: 8.8 g
- Sugars: 5.3 g
- Dietary fiber: 1.5 g
- Fat: 0.4 g
- Protein: 1.9 g
Vitamins and minerals
Vitamins	Quantity %DV^{†}
Vitamin A equiv. beta-Carotene	5% 48 μg 5% 534 μg
Vitamin B6	30% 0.51 mg
Vitamin C	160% 144 mg
Minerals	Quantity %DV^{†}
Iron	6% 1 mg
Magnesium	5% 23 mg
Potassium	11% 322 mg
- Other constituents: Quantity
- Water: 88 g
- Capsaicin: 0.01g – 6 g
- Link to USDA Database entry
- ^{†}Percentages estimated using US recommendations for adults, except for potassium, which is estimated based on expert recommendation from the National Academies.

Red hot chili peppers are 88% water, 9% carbohydrates, 2% protein, and 0.4% fat (table). In a 100 gram reference amount, chili peppers supply 40 calories, and are a rich source of vitamin C and vitamin B_{6}.

=== Pungency ===
Due to their unique pungency (spicy heat), chili peppers constitute a crucial part of many cuisines, particularly Chinese (especially Sichuanese), Mexican, Thai, Indian, Yoruba, New Mexican and many other South American, Caribbean and East Asian cuisines. In 21st-century Asian cuisine, chili peppers are commonly used across many regions. Chili is a key ingredient in many curries, providing the desired amount of heat; mild curries may be flavoured with many other spices, and may omit chili altogether.

=== Cooking ===
Chilies with a low capsaicin content can be cooked like bell peppers, for example stuffing and roasting them. Hotter varieties need to be handled with care to avoid contact with skin or eyes; washing does not efficiently remove capsaicin from skin. Chilies can be roasted over very hot coals or grilled for a short time, as they break up if overcooked.

The leaves of every species of Capsicum are edible, being mildly bitter and nowhere near as hot as the fruits. They are cooked as greens in Filipino cuisine, where they are called dahon ng sili (literally "chili leaves"). They are used in the chicken soup tinola. In Korean cuisine, the leaves may be used in kimchi.

=== Regional cuisines ===
Chilies are present in many cuisines, including curries. In Peru, Papa a la huancaina is a dish of potatoes in a sauce of fresh cheese and aji amarillo chilies. In Thailand, kaeng tai pla fish curry is flavoured with a tai pla sauce made with garlic, shallots, galangal, kaffir lime, turmeric, fish paste, and bird's eye chilies. In Jamaica, jerk chicken is spiced with powerful habanero chilies and allspice. Goan vindaloo curry uses the extremely hot ghost pepper or bhut jolokia to create "perhaps [India's] hottest dish". In Bhutan, ema datshi, entirely made of chili mixed with local cheese, is the national dish. Many Mexican dishes use chilies of different types, including the jalapeño, poblano, habanero, serrano, chipotle, ancho, pasilla, guajillo, de árbol, cascabel and mulato. These offer a wide range of flavours including citrus, earthy, fruity, and grassy. They are used in many dishes and the spicy mole sauce and Mexican salsa sauces. In Yoruba cuisine, chillies are well used in many dishes including Ewa Agoyin and Obe ata.

Dishes

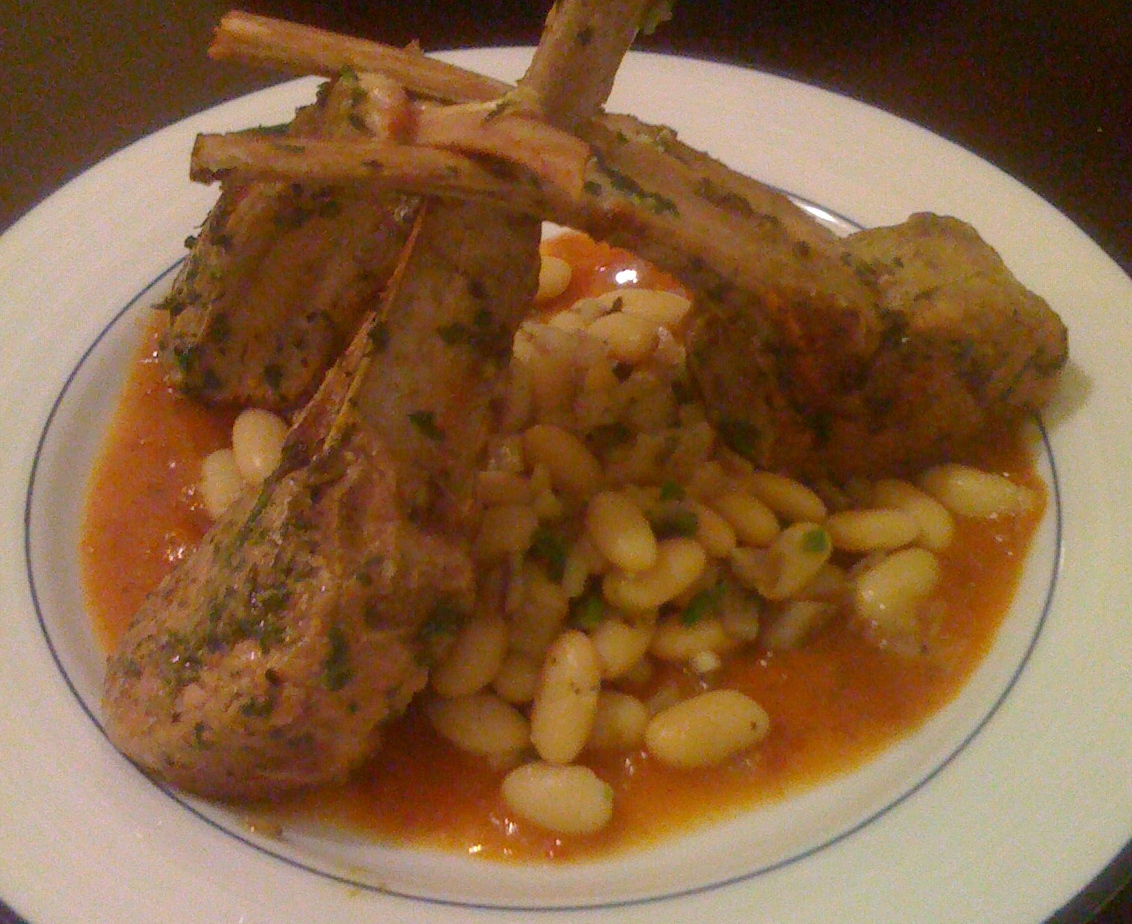
Mexican lamb chops with guajillo chili sauce and charro beans

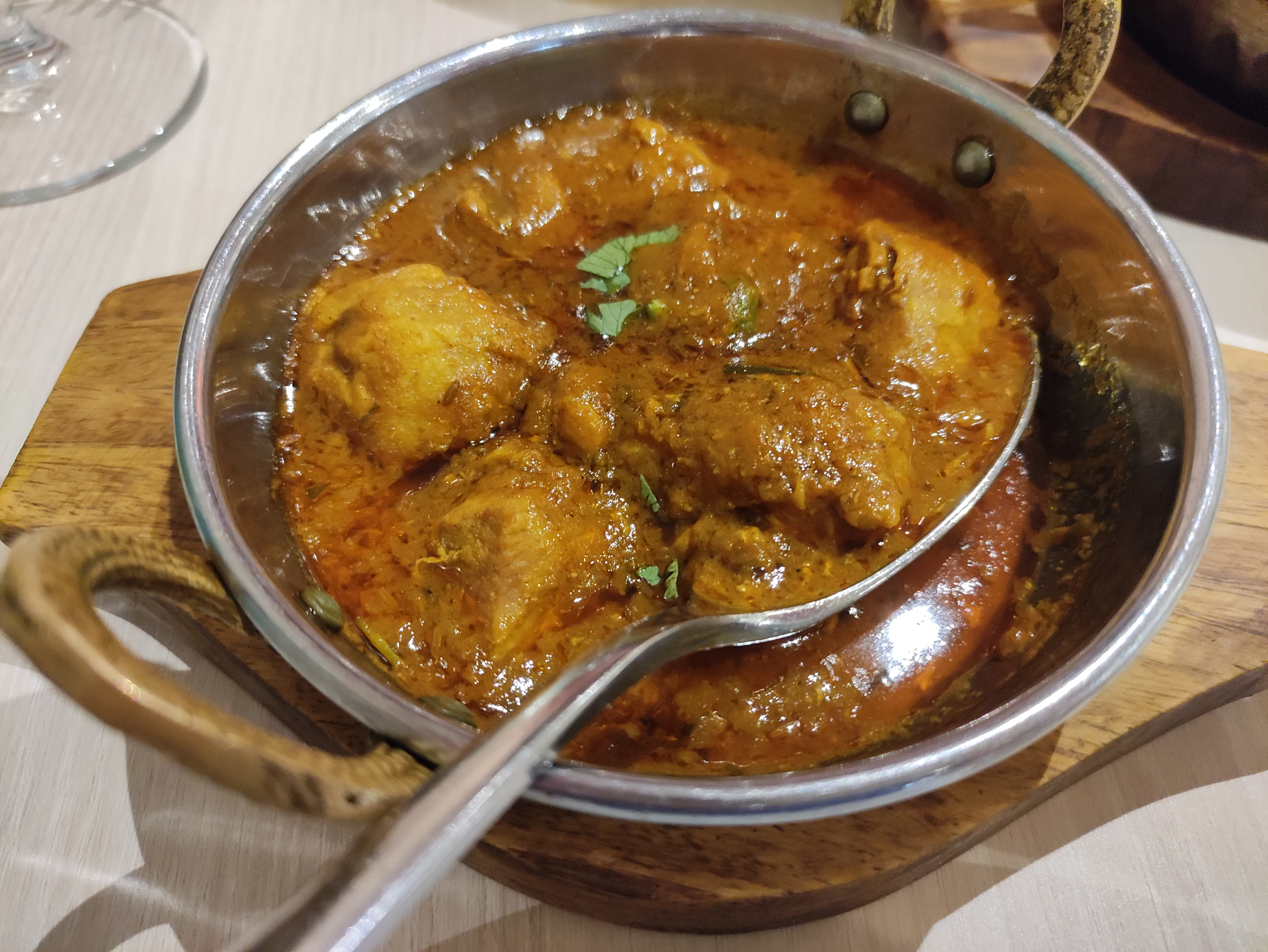
Lamb Madras curry

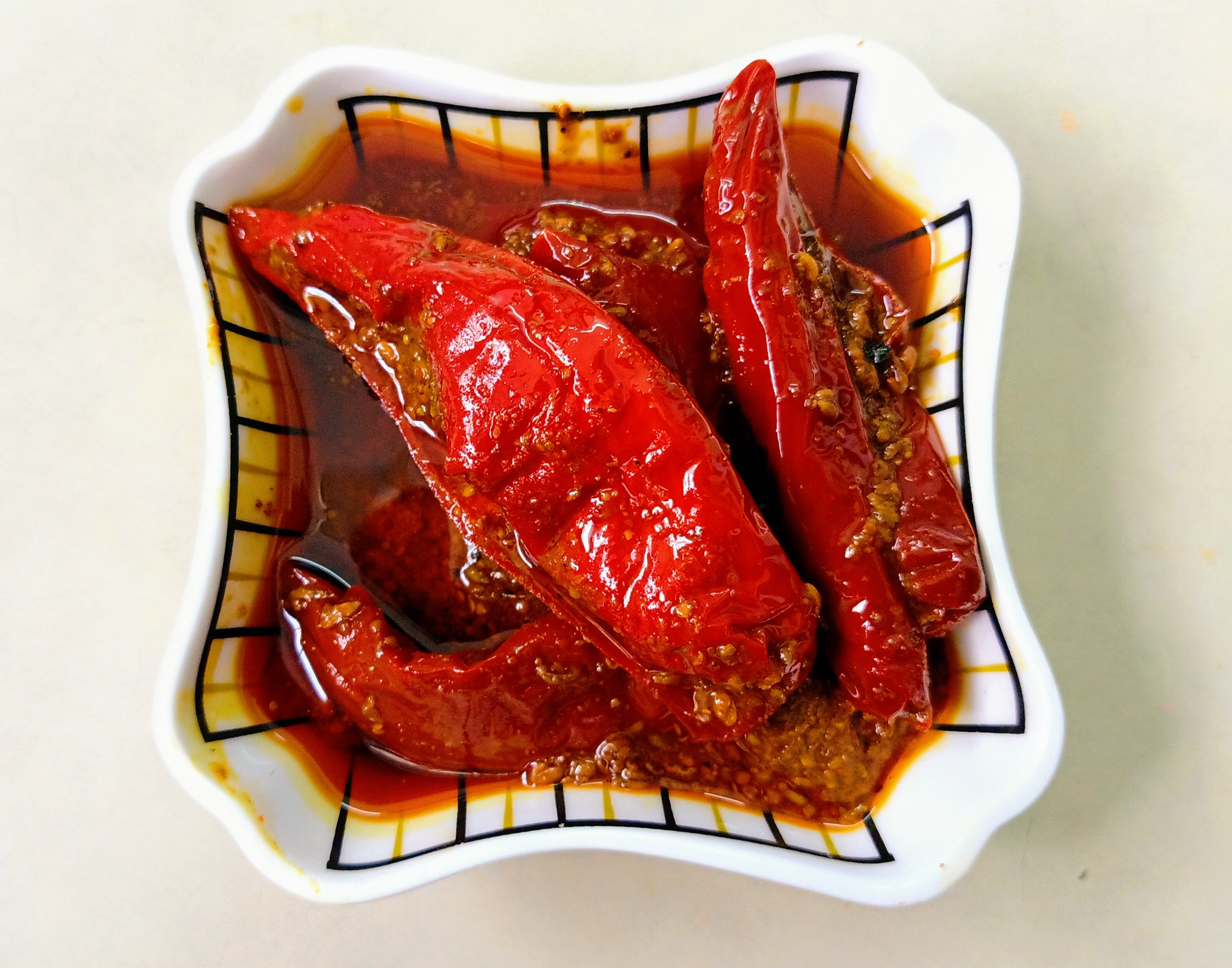
Pickled chili in India

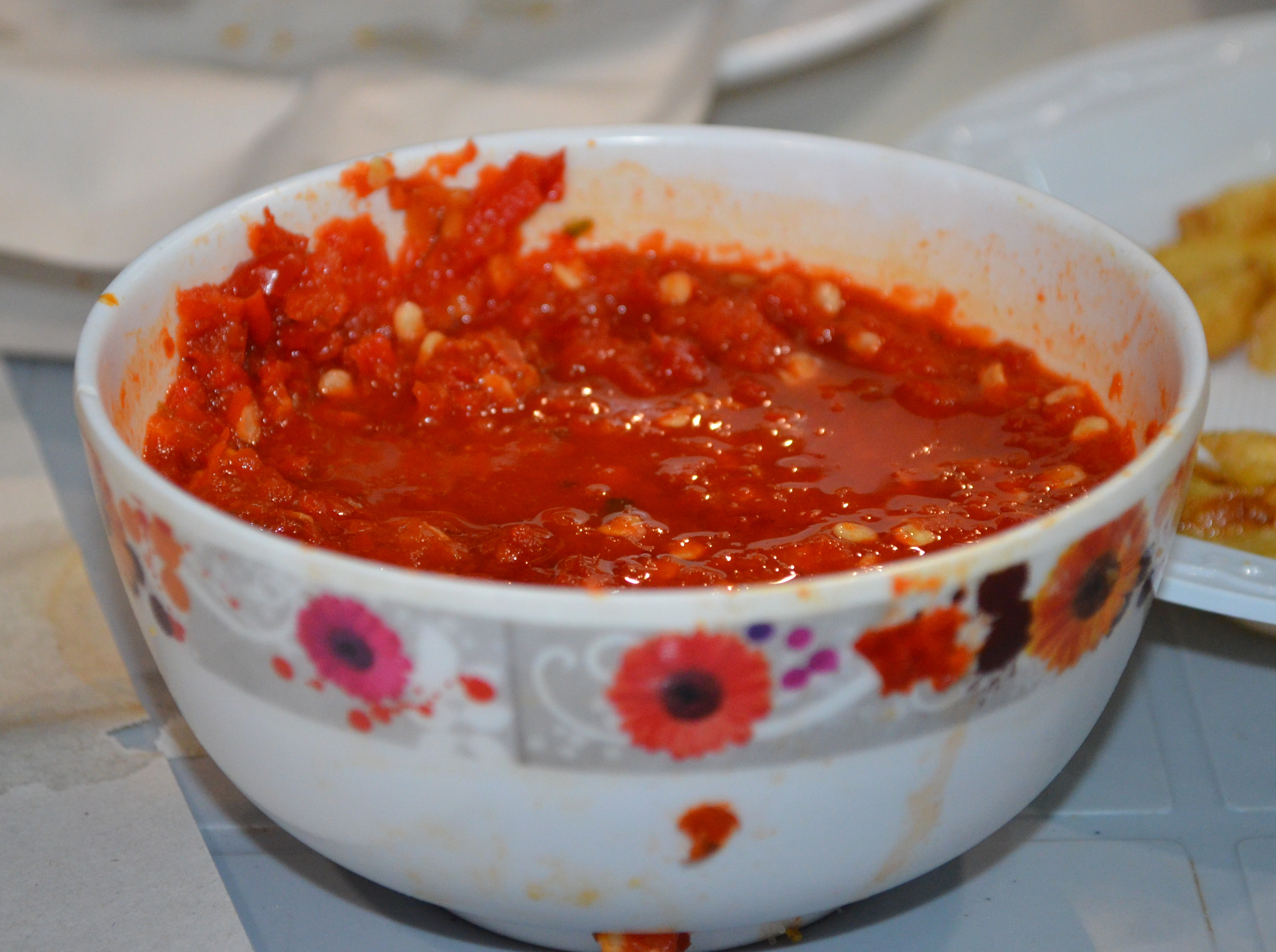
Chili pepper dip in a traditional restaurant in Amman, Jordan

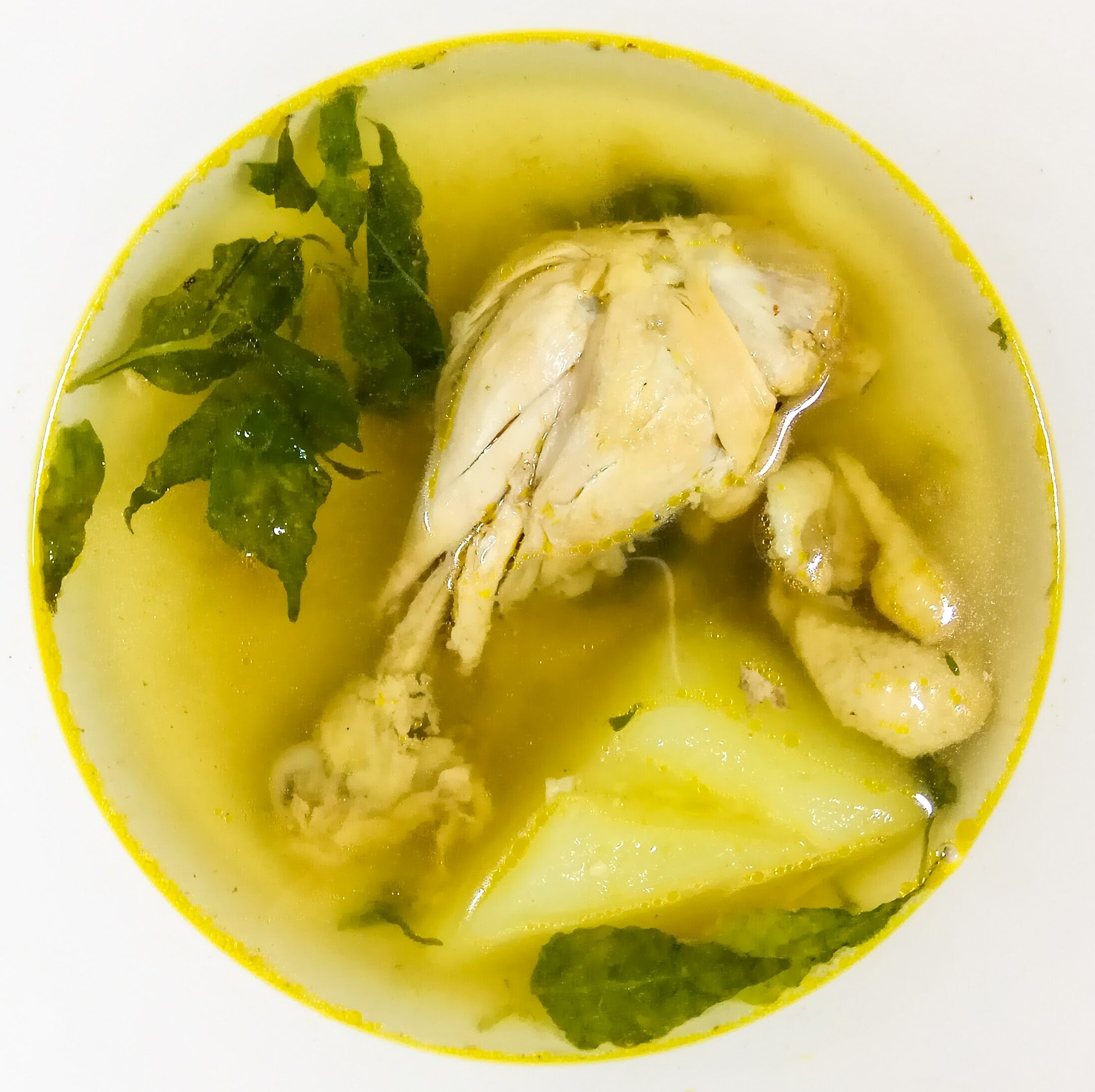
Filipino tinola chicken soup with labuyo chili leaves

== Other uses ==
=== Ornamental plants ===
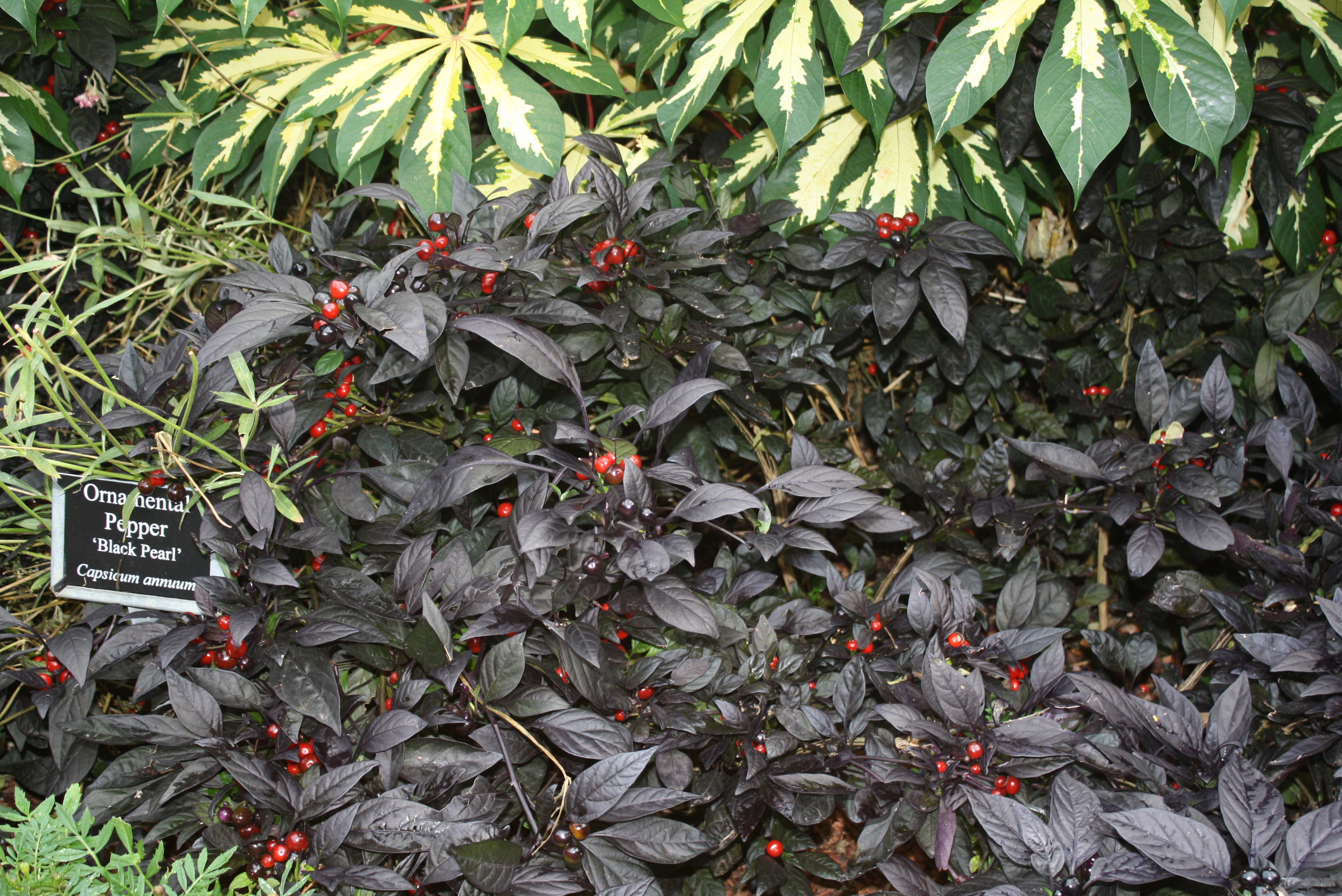
Black pearl pepper, an ornamental variety

The contrast in color and appearance makes chili plants interesting to some as a purely decorative garden plant.

- Black pearl pepper: small cherry-shaped fruits and dark brown to black leaves
- Black Hungarian pepper: green foliage, highlighted by purple veins and purple flowers, jalapeño-shaped fruits
- Bishop's crown pepper, Christmas bell pepper: named for its distinct three-sided shape resembling a red bishop's crown or a red Christmas bell

=== Constrained risk-taking ===
Psychologist Paul Rozin suggests that eating ordinary chilies is an example of a "constrained risk" like riding a roller coaster, in which extreme sensations like pain and fear can be enjoyed because individuals know that these sensations are not actually harmful. This method lets people experience extreme feelings without any significant risk of bodily harm.

=== Topical use and health research ===
Capsaicin, the pungent chemical in chili peppers, is used as an analgesic in topical ointments, nasal sprays, and dermal patches to relieve pain. A 2022 review of preliminary research indicated that regular consumption of chili peppers was associated with weak evidence for a lower risk of death from cardiovascular diseases and cancer.

=== Chemical irritants ===
Capsaicin extracted from chilies is used in pepper sprays and some tear gas formulations as a chemical irritant, for use as less-lethal weapons for control of unruly individuals or crowds. Such products have considerable potential for misuse, and may cause injury or death.

In Africa and Asia, elephants nightly destroy crops and endanger people. Chilies are effective at keeping elephants away, as capsaicin irritates their large and sensitive olfactory and nasal system. Farmers can plant a few rows of the fruit around valuable crops; or they may burn chili dung bombs, bricks of dung and chili, creating a noxious smoke.

Birds do not have the same sensitivity to capsaicin as mammals, as they lack a specific pain receptor. Some species in the chili peppers' natural range eat the fruits, possibly dispersing the seeds.

=== Supposed aphrodisiac ===
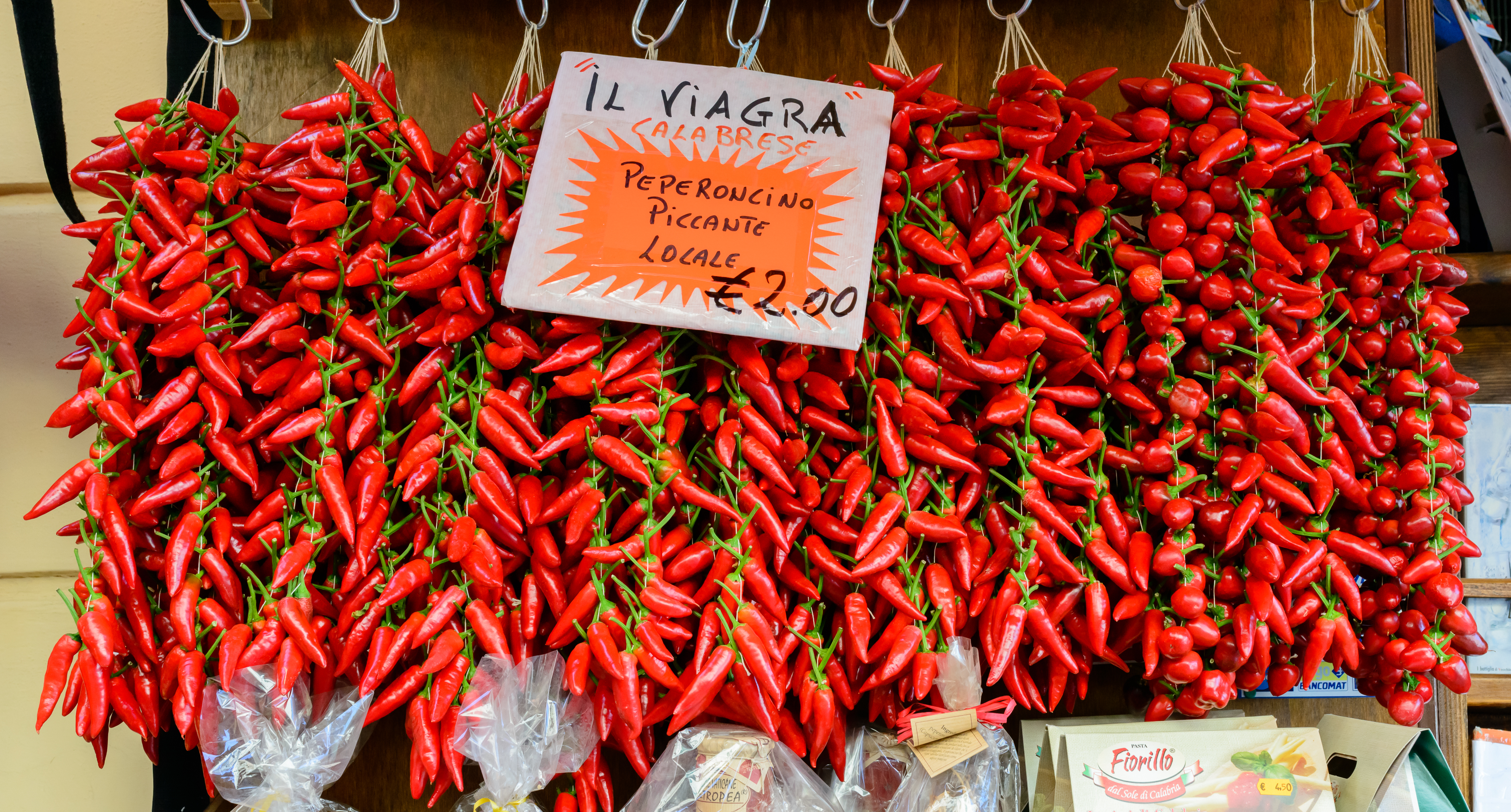
Peperoncino chilies in Italy, advertised as an aphrodisiac (Note: The sign says in Italian "Calabrian Viagra".)

The 16th century Spanish missionary and naturalist José de Acosta noted the supposed aphrodisiac power of chilies, but wrote that they were harmful to people's spiritual health. In the 1970s, the government of Peru forbade prison inmates to consume chilies, their explanation being that these were "not appropriate for men forced to live a limited lifestyle."

=== In space ===
The 2021 Plant Habitat-04 experiment aboard the International Space Station grew four chili plants in 137 days, producing twenty-six peppers across two harvests. Most were eaten by the crew; twelve were returned to Earth for study. The plants were a specially dwarfed variety of the Hatch cultivar. This was the "first generally recognized fruiting crop in space", following harvests of leaf crops such as lettuce and kale from 2014 onwards.

== See also ==
- Food and drink prohibitions – which in some cultures includes chili peppers
- Hatch, New Mexico – known as the "Chile Capital of the World"
- History of chocolate – which the Maya drank with ground chili peppers
- International Connoisseurs of Green and Red Chile – organization for the promotion of chili peppers
- Pepper classification
- Peppersoup
- Salsa (sauce)
- Sweet chili sauce – a condiment for adding a sweet, mild heat taste to food
