= Aporreadillo =

Mexican dish

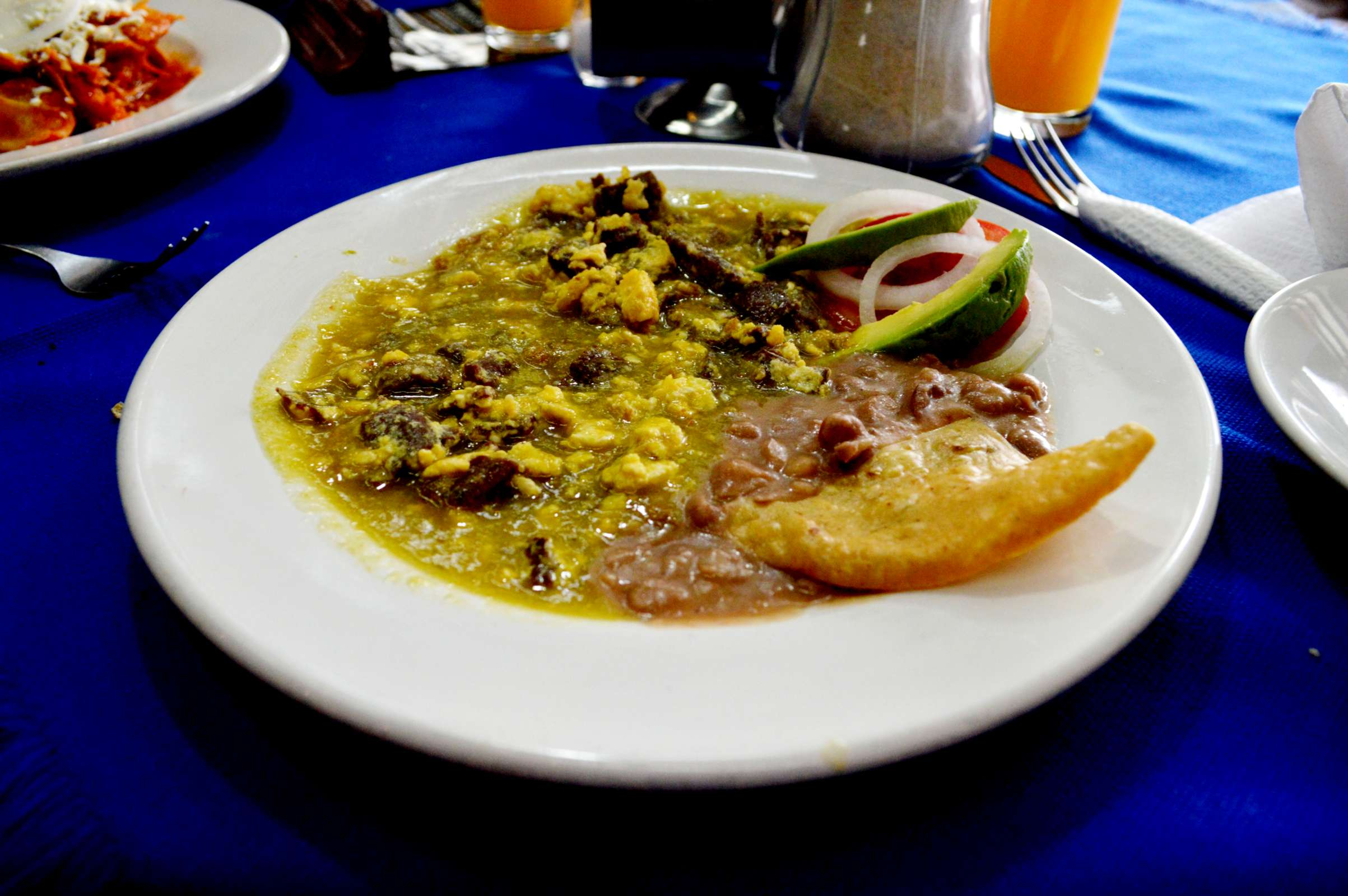
- Alternative names: Aporreado
- Course: Main
- Place of origin: Mexico
- Region or state: Michoacán and Guerrero
- Main ingredients: Beef (or venison or cured meat), scrambled eggs, chili sauce

Aporreadillo (or aporreado) is a typical Mexican dish from the cuisine of southwestern Mexico.

This dish consists of meat pounded with a stone, which is salted and shredded, scrambled with egg, and cooked in a guajillo, chile de árbol, or serrano pepper sauce, with garlic and cilantro. It can be made with dried and salted beef or venison, or with any cured meat. It is served with rice and beans for breakfast, lunch, or dinner.

Aporreadillo can be red or green, depending on the color of the sauce. It is traditional in Tiquicheo, Michoacán, although it is also found in the state of Guerrero.

== See also ==
- List of meat dishes
