= International Connoisseurs of Green and Red Chile =

International Connoisseurs of Green and Red Chile (ICGRC) was an American organization created to promote the enjoyment of chili peppers. ICGRC was founded in Mesilla, New Mexico in 1973 and grew to have chapters throughout the United States and in 17 other countries. ICGRC provided information about how to grow chili peppers and how to use them in recipes. The organization was taken over by the Las Cruces Convention and Visitors Bureau in 1989.

== About ==
The organization published a quarterly magazine called Chile Connoisseur News. There were several chapters of the group and each chapter was headed by a Pod Father. The president of the organization was known as the "Queso Grande" or "Big Cheese." The chapters also had humorous names that often played on puns and gave out awards to members who were known as "Pod Fellows" or "Fellows of the Pod." Members shared recipes, chili pepper seeds and propagation information. There were four membership levels starting at the "Order of the Complete Coward" and culminating at the "Order of the Steel Stomach."

== History ==
ICGRC was founded in Mesilla, New Mexico by 25 charter members who met at La Posta in 1973. The organization was affiliated with New Mexico State University (NMSU). ICGRC was originally headquartered in Mesilla. NMSU had been receiving numerous requests from alumni for "chile care packages." The founding members felt that promoting information about chili peppers would be a good way to help individuals who missed the spicy food.

By 1976, there were several chapters, or pods, of ICGRC including in Albuquerque, New Mexico, Denver, El Paso, Texas, Logan, Utah, and Washington, D.C. In addition, ICGRC had around 3,000 members by 1976. The Phoenix, Arizona chapter was started in 1978. Seventeen countries had chapters as well by 1980. There was a Taos, New Mexico chapter by 1980.

ICGRC received the El Conquistador Award from the New Mexico chapter of the Public Relations Society of America in 1977. In 1989, the Las Cruces Convention and Visitors Bureau took over the organization.

== Notable members ==
- Carl Albert
- Vikki Carr
- Jose Feliciano
- Bob Hope
- Hubert Humphrey
- Ronald Reagan
- Lawrence Welk
