= Kambuzi =

Variety of chili pepper

'Kambuzi'
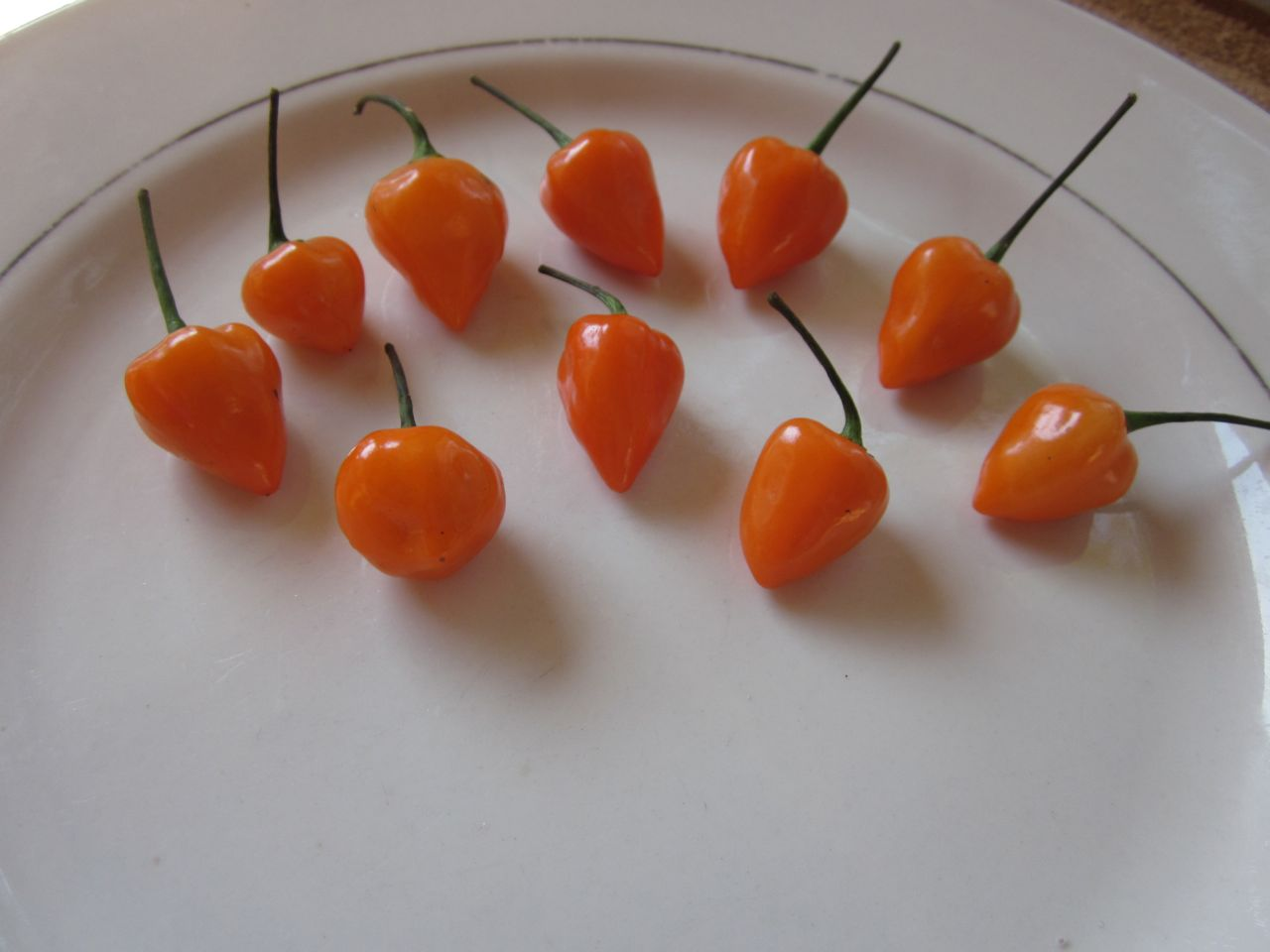
- Genus: Capsicum
- Species: Capsicum chinense
- Cultivar: 'Kambuzi'
- Origin: Malawi
- Heat: Very hot
- Scoville scale: 50,000–175,000 SHU

Kambuzi is a small, round chili pepper cultivar found in central Malawi, a landlocked country in southeast Africa. It comes in a variety of colors including yellow, red and orange. It is used to make condiments and turned into sauces, or sandwich spreads. Their flavor is similar to that of the Habanero chili.

The name translates to "little goat", as goats are known to munch on the leaves of these peppers.
