= Black Pearl pepper =

Flowering plant cultivar

Capsicum annuum 'Black Pearl'
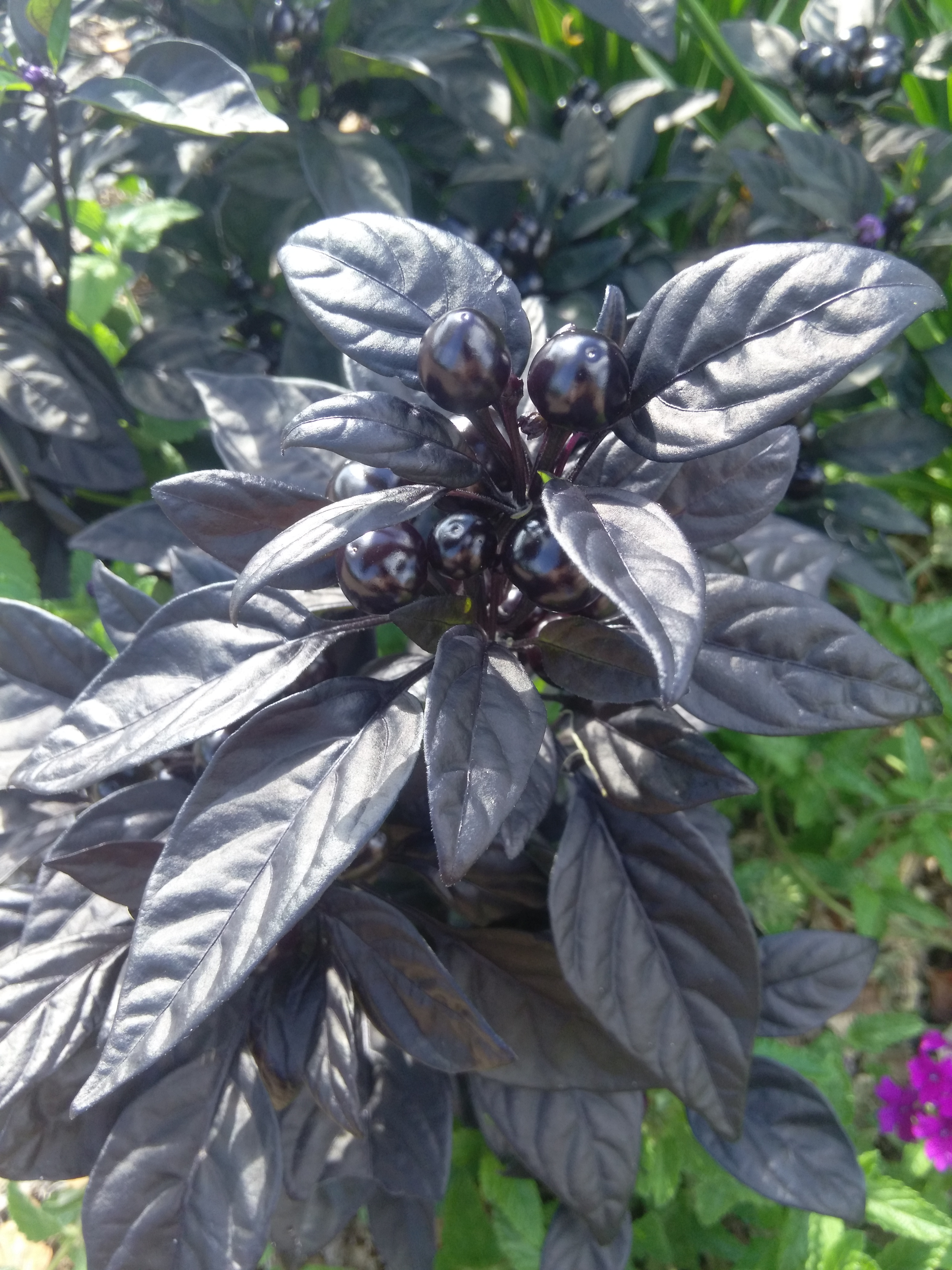
- Species: Capsicum annuum
- Cultivar: 'Black Pearl'
- Breeder: Rob Griesbach and John Stommel
- Origin: United States
- Heat: Hot
- Scoville scale: 10,000-30,000 SHU

Black Pearl pepper is a cultivar of Capsicum annuum. It is characterized by distinctive black leaves and fruit. It was developed by Arboretum Floral and Nursery Plants Research Unit scientists Rob Griesbach and John Stommel of the Agricultural Research Service’s Vegetable Laboratory. This pepper plant is notably similar to another strain, named the Black Hungarian, another designer pepper plant. Though edible (the flavor has a citrus undertone with a slow burn between 4 and 12 times hotter than a jalapeño on the Scoville Scale), it is considered an ornamental plant and even won an award for its beauty from All-Americas Selections in 2006. The Black Pearl has characteristic semi-gloss black to deep-purple leaves with peppers that are black and turn crimson when fully ripe. The Plant when fully grown is typically between 14-18 inches.

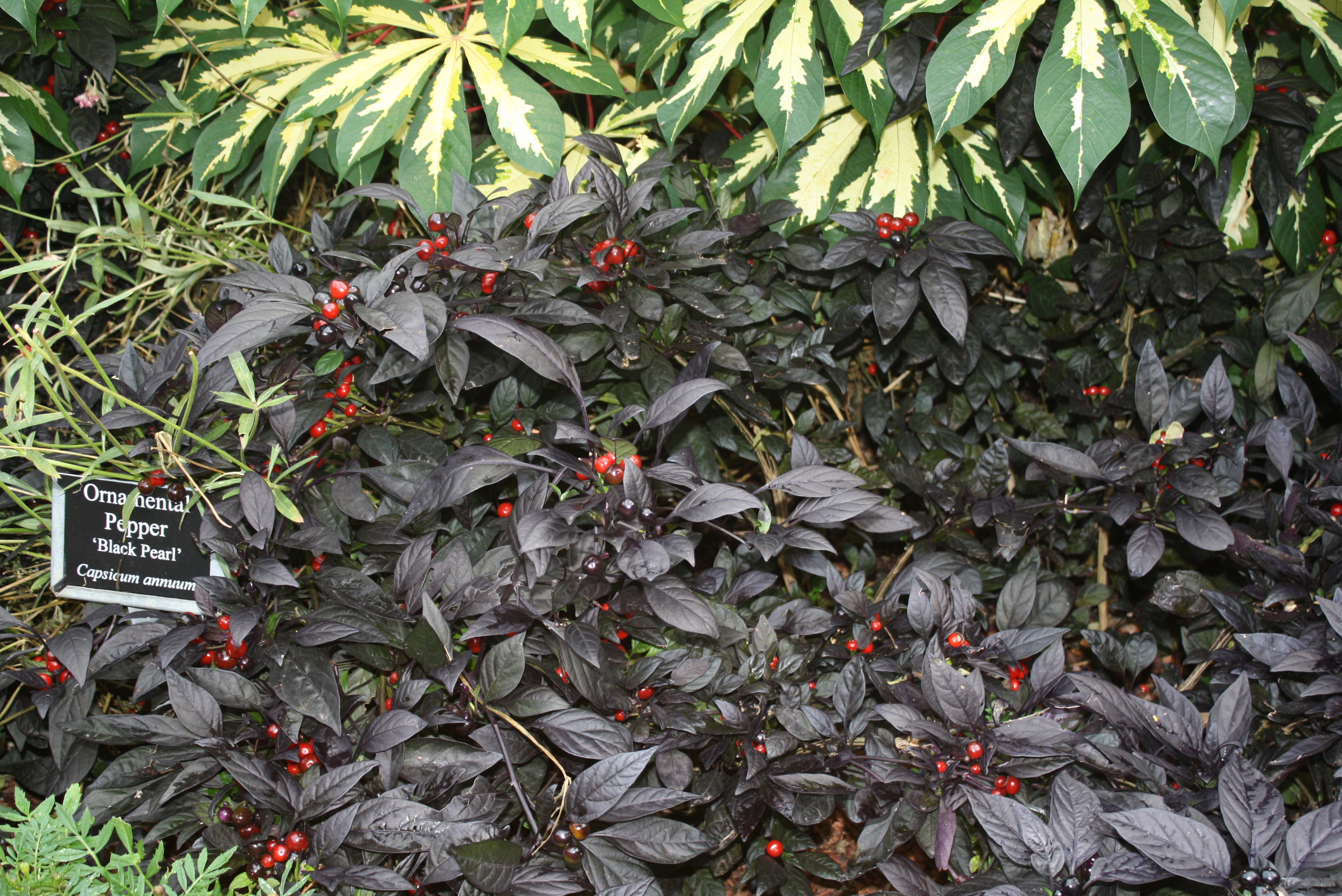
Black Pearl Pepper
