= Guajillo =

Guajillo may refer to:

- Guajillo acacia, a common name for Acacia berlandieri, a shrub native to the Southwestern United States
- The Guajillo chili, the dried form of the mirasol chili
