= Pepper classification =

Overview of the systems used to classify chili peppers

Chili peppers, the fruit of plants in the genus Capsicum (Solanaceae), are classified in several complementary ways. Botanists group them by species and by formal cultivar group; horticulturists and the trade sort cultivars into "pod types" by the size, shape and use of the fruit; cooks rank them by pungency or heat; and germplasm collections identify individual samples by genebank accession numbers. The systems answer different questions and are used alongside one another rather than in place of one another.

== Botanical classification ==
All cultivated peppers belong to the genus Capsicum. Five species account for essentially all domesticated peppers, and although they can be hard to tell apart as young plants, each is distinguished by characters of the flower and seed:

- Capsicum annuum usually bears a single flower per node with a white, unspotted corolla and straw-coloured seeds. It is by far the most widely grown species, covering bell peppers, jalapeños, cayenne, and most sweet and hot peppers of commerce.
- Capsicum chinense bears two or more flowers per node, a white to greenish-white corolla, and a distinctive ring-like constriction where the calyx meets the stalk. It includes the habaneros and most of the very hot cultivars.
- Capsicum frutescens also bears two or more small greenish-white flowers per node, often held erect; the tabasco pepper is the best-known example.
- Capsicum baccatum, the South American ají peppers, is recognised by the yellow, green or tan spots at the base of its cream-coloured corolla.
- Capsicum pubescens, the rocoto and manzano, is the most distinct: it has a purple corolla, hairy (pubescent) leaves, and uniquely black seeds, and it tolerates cooler conditions than the others.

Alongside the domesticated five are numerous wild species; a 2022 monograph of the genus recognised 43 species in all. Because domesticated peppers within a species interbreed freely and vary enormously in fruit shape, colour and heat, the species name alone rarely identifies a particular kind of pepper.

== Cultivar groups ==
Below the species, cultivars can be placed in formal Cultivar Groups under the International Code of Nomenclature for Cultivated Plants. For C. annuum the traditional groups, following the botanist Liberty Hyde Bailey, include the Grossum Group (bell and pimiento peppers), the Longum Group (long-podded chiles such as cayenne and the New Mexican types), the Cerasiforme Group (cherry peppers), the Conoides Group (small cone-shaped peppers), and the Fasciculatum Group (clustered, upright pods). These groups predate modern genetic study and are used less in practice than the informal pod types, but they give a formal botanical framework at the infraspecific level.

== Pod type ==
In horticultural and trade usage a pod type groups peppers by the physical shape of the fruit, set apart from its heat, colour or use. Because one shape is shared by many differently named cultivars, the familiar market names are a poor guide to it: jalapeño, serrano, cayenne and Anaheim, for instance, are all variations on a single elongate, tapering shape. Reference works therefore sort peppers into a set of pod shapes.

Shapes commonly distinguished include:

- Bell / blocky — squarish, lobed, thick-walled pods with a blunt end.
- Elongate / tapered — long pods narrowing to a point, such as the jalapeño, Anaheim, cayenne and serrano.
- Long and noodly — very long, thin pods, often kinked or curling.
- Short / squat — small, stubby pods broader for their length.
- Conical / bullet — small, short, pointed pods such as the pequín.
- Round — squat, globular, tomato-shaped pods.
- Ovate — egg-shaped pods, as in the rocoto.
- Habanero-type — pendant, tapering, thin-walled, wrinkled pods.
- Mushroom / bonnet — squat, pleated, puckered pods such as the Scotch bonnet.
- Wedge / lantern — flared, bell-flower-shaped (campanulate) pods.
- Apple / blunt — thick, rounded, blunt-ended pods.
- Curled / twisted — irregularly curling or contorted pods.
- Unusual — distinctive forms that fit none of the above, including the flattened, winged "UFO" pods of the Bishop's crown.

Because pod type records only shape, identifying a particular pepper still requires its species, ripe colour and heat as well.

== Surface and secondary traits ==
Peppers are further distinguished by surface texture and colour patterning, traits independent of shape that are often what separates otherwise similar cultivars. Surface ranges from smooth and glossy, through matte or powdery, to distinctly warty or bumpy (common on the superhots), corked with rough tan scarring (prized on some jalapeños), netted or veined, and occasionally translucent-skinned.

Colour patterning includes striped pods (the Fish pepper), flecked or speckled, marbled or swirled, blotched, banded and mottled forms. Some cultivars carry persistent anthocyanin, a purple-to-black pigment, or a coloured or "bleeding" calyx, and many pass through several distinct colours as they ripen (multicolour ripening, as in NuMex Twilight and Bolivian Rainbow).

== Heat ==
Peppers are also classified by pungency, the burning sensation produced by capsaicin and related capsaicinoids, which are concentrated in the placental tissue that holds the seeds. Heat is most often expressed on the Scoville scale, devised by the pharmacist Wilbur Scoville in 1912. His original method was organoleptic: an extract of the pepper was diluted with sugar water until a taste panel could no longer detect the burn, and the dilution factor became the rating in Scoville heat units (SHU). Because taste panels are subjective, laboratories now measure capsaicinoid content directly by high-performance liquid chromatography and convert the result to Scoville units.

On this scale sweet peppers such as the bell register zero; jalapeños fall in the low thousands; cayenne and tabasco in the tens of thousands; habaneros and Scotch bonnets between about 100,000 and 350,000; and the hottest bred "superhot" cultivars, such as the ghost pepper and Carolina Reaper, exceed one million SHU. Heat also varies within a cultivar with ripeness, growing conditions and water stress, so published figures are ranges rather than fixed values.

== Genebank and accession systems ==
Peppers held in germplasm collections are identified by genebank accession numbers. An accession is a distinct sample held in a collection, and its number is tied to passport data (origin, collector, and taxonomic identity) rather than to a description of the fruit; further characterisation and evaluation data record the plant's observed traits. To keep those trait records consistent between collections, characterisation follows standardised descriptor lists such as the IPGRI Descriptors for Capsicum.

Major collections use their own accession prefixes: the USDA issues "PI" numbers through its Germplasm Resources Information Network (GRIN); the Centre for Genetic Resources, the Netherlands uses "CGN" numbers; the Leibniz Institute of Plant Genetics and Crop Plant Research (IPK) at Gatersleben uses the "CAP" prefix for its Capsicum accessions; and the World Vegetable Center maintains one of the largest pepper collections under its own codes. Because the same variety may be held under different numbers in different banks, these identifiers are cross-referenced through international portals such as Genesys, EURISCO and the Global Biodiversity Information Facility, which allow one accession to be traced across databases.

== See also ==
- Capsicum
- Chili pepper
- Scoville scale
- List of Capsicum cultivars
- Bird pepper
