= Bird pepper =

Common name for several small bird-dispersed chili peppers

Bird pepper (also bird's eye pepper) is a common name for several small-fruited chili peppers of the genus Capsicum whose pungent fruit is eaten and dispersed by wild birds. Birds do not sense the burn of capsaicin and pass the seeds unharmed, so bird-dispersed chilies tend to be small, red and borne within reach of birds. Because the name describes this habit rather than a single species, it has been applied to several different wild and semi-domesticated peppers:

- Capsicum annuum var. glabriusculum – the wild bird pepper or chiltepin (also tepín) of the southern United States, Mexico, Central America and northern South America; the most likely wild progenitor of the domesticated Capsicum annuum.
- Pequin pepper – a small, semi-domesticated hot chili of Mexico placed within C. annuum var. glabriusculum and frequently confused with the tepín.
- Bird's eye chili – a small, very hot C. annuum widely grown in Southeast Asia, also called Thai chili.
- Siling labuyo – a bird's eye chili of the Philippines belonging to the species Capsicum frutescens.
- Capsicum frutescens – a chili species that includes the African bird's eye, also known as piri piri.

In the Americas the name usually refers to the wild Capsicum annuum var. glabriusculum, whereas in the Old World "bird's eye" is applied to cultivated Asian and African chilies of both C. annuum and C. frutescens.

== See also ==
- List of Capsicum cultivars
