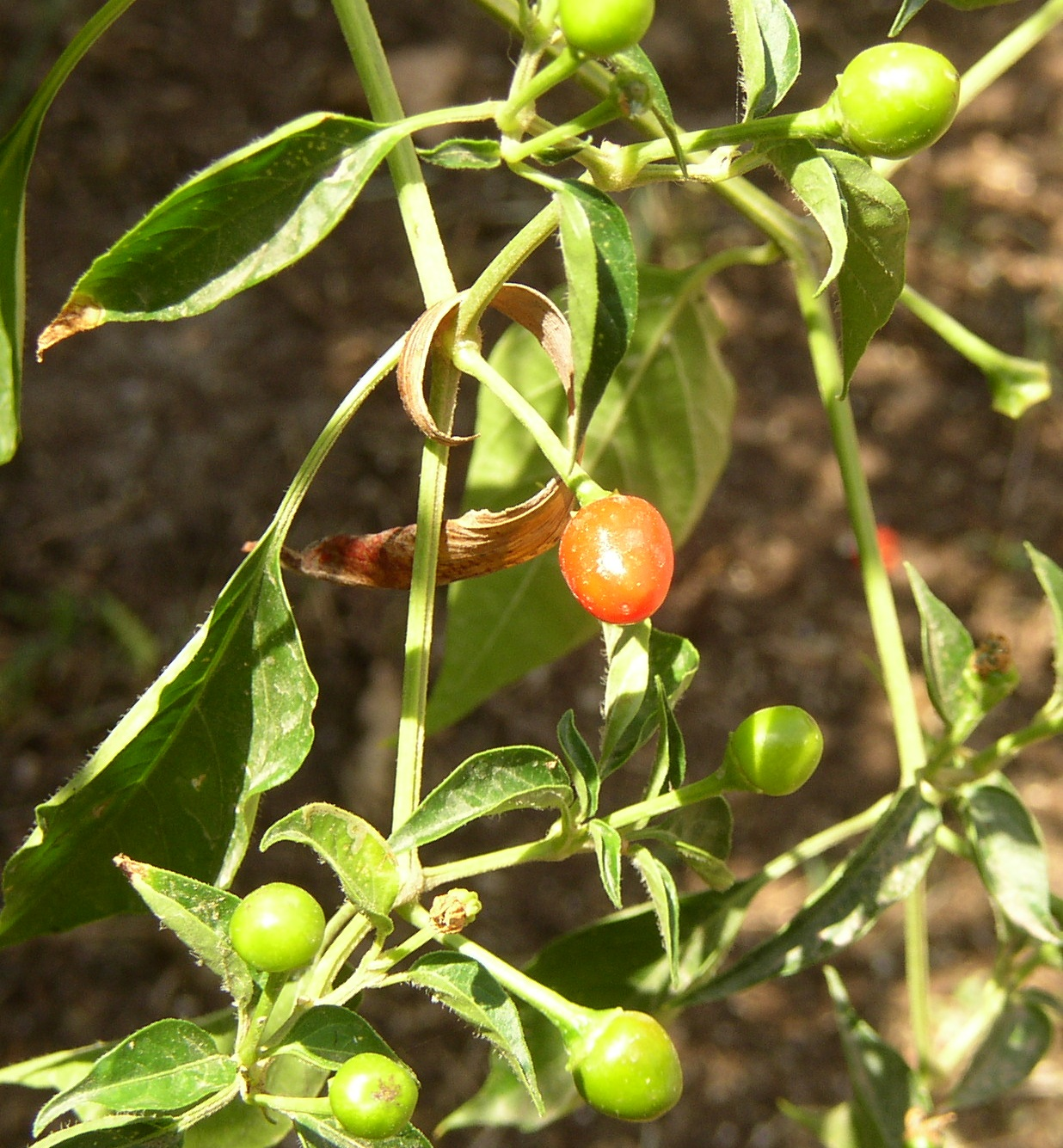

Conservation status
- Secure (NatureServe)

Scientific classification
- Kingdom: Plantae
- Clade: Tracheophytes
- Clade: Angiosperms
- Clade: Eudicots
- Clade: Asterids
- Order: Solanales
- Family: Solanaceae
- Genus: Capsicum
- Species: C. annuum
- Variety: C. a. var. glabriusculum

Trinomial name
- Capsicum annuum var. glabriusculum (Dunal) Heiser and Pickersgill

Synonyms
- C. annuum var. minimum (Mill.) Heiser; C. hispidum var. glabriusculum Dunal; C. microphyllum Dunal

= Capsicum annuum var. glabriusculum =

Variety of chili pepper

Capsicum annuum var. glabriusculum
- Heat: Very hot
- Scoville scale: 20,000 – 140,000 SHU

Capsicum annuum var. glabriusculum, a chili-pepper variety of Capsicum annuum, is native to southern North America and northern South America. Common names include chiltepín, Indian pepper, grove pepper, chiltepe, and chile tepín, as well as turkey, bird’s eye, or simply bird peppers (due to their consumption and spread by wild birds; "unlike humans birds are impervious to the heat of peppers"). Tepín is derived from a Nahuatl word meaning "flea". This variety is the most likely progenitor of the domesticated C. annuum var. annuum. Another similar-sized pepper, 'Pequin' (also called 'piquin') is often confused with tepin, although the tepin fruit is round to oval where as the pequin's fruit is oval with a point, and the leaves, stems and plant structures are very different on each plant.

== Etymology and common names ==
The name chiltepín comes from the Nahuatl chīltēcpin, roughly "flea chile", a reference to the fruit's tiny size and sharp, biting heat. Because the wild plant is dispersed across a wide range by birds, isolated populations have acquired many regional names. In Mexico and the southwestern United States it is known as chiltepín, chiltepe, tepín, chile del monte ("wild chile"), or simply bird pepper; the Maya of the Yucatán call it max or ma'ax ik ("monkey chile"), and comparable wild peppers in Brazil are called pimenta-de-passarinho ("little-bird pepper").

The closely related pequín (or piquín) is frequently confused with the tepín. The difference is mainly one of shape and cultivation rather than species: tepíns and chiltepíns are round to slightly oval and are gathered from wild stands, whereas pequíns are elongated to pointed, somewhat larger, and are often semi-cultivated.

== Description ==
Chiltepin is a perennial shrub that usually grows to a height of around 1 m (3 ft 3 in), but sometimes reaches 3 m (9 ft 10 in). In areas without hard frost in winter, plants can live 35–50 years.

=== Fruit ===
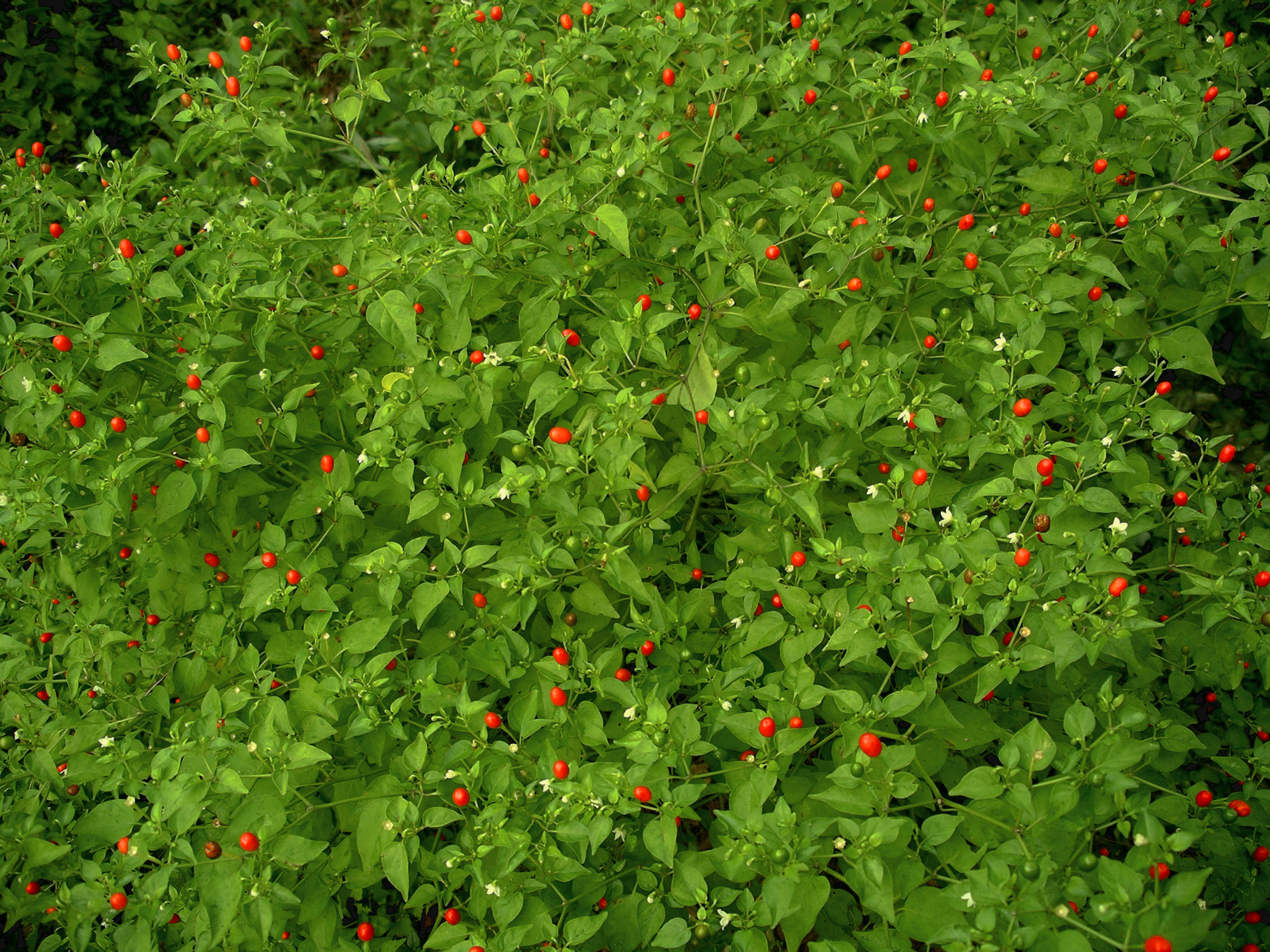
Cluster of 18 intertwined plants

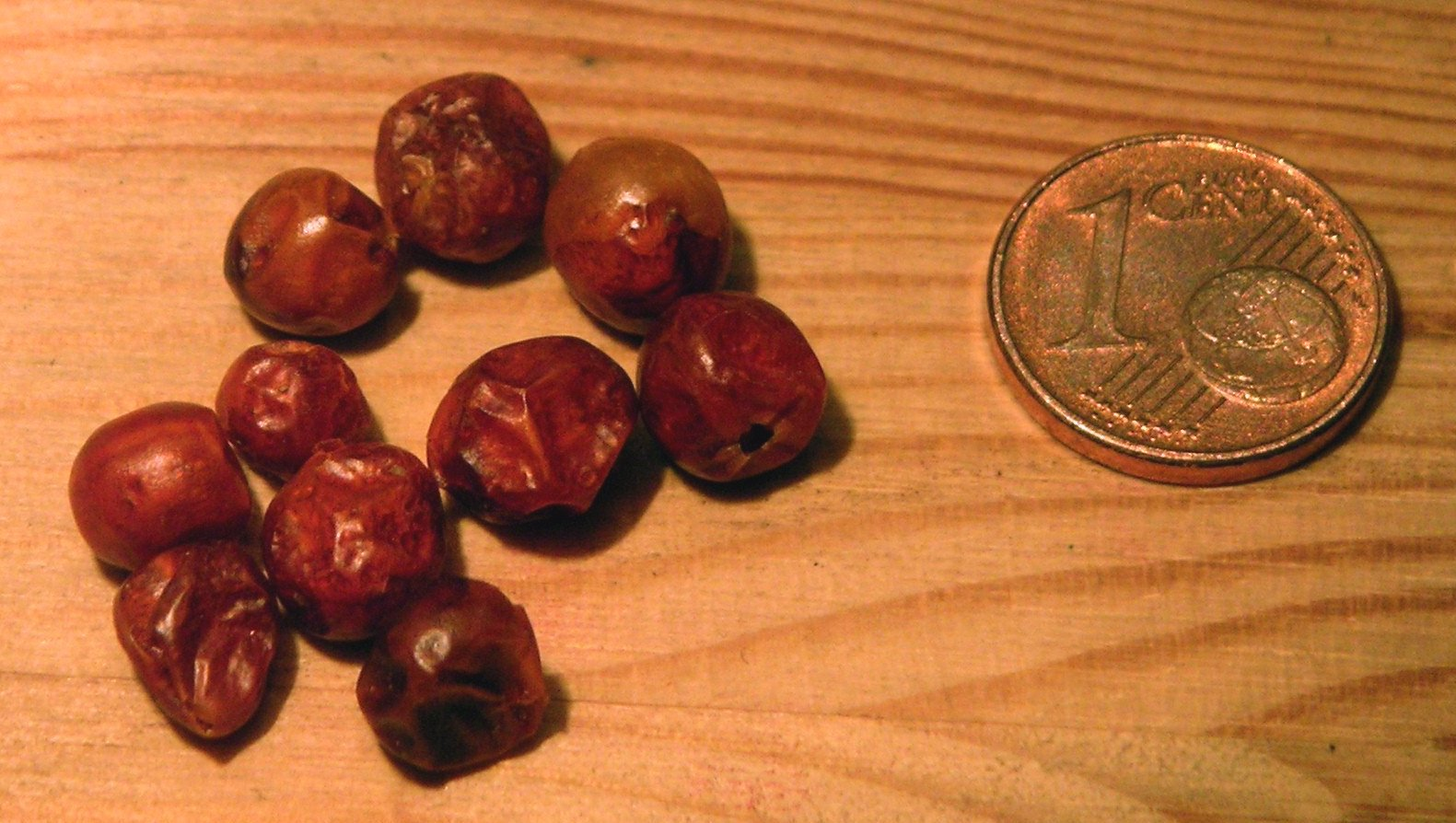
Capsicum annuum chiltepin dried

The tiny chili peppers of C. annuum var. glabriusculum are red to orange-red, usually slightly ellipsoidal, and about 0.8 cm (1/3 in) in diameter. Some strains of tepin peppers are much closer to perfectly round when fresh. A dried tepin pepper appears quite round even if it was slightly ellipsoidal when fresh. Tepin peppers are very hot, measuring between 20,000–140,000 SHU, with the highest levels seen in green fruit ~40 days after fruit set. The tepin can be hotter than the habanero or red savina.

However and since this pepper is primarily harvested from wild stands in the Mexican desert, the heat level of the fruit can vary greatly from year to year, depending on the amount of natural rainfall that occurs during the time the fruits are forming. Fruit heat levels can be weak during drought years, and normal rainfall years produce the highest heat levels. The heat levels also varies between the green fresh fruits (which are pickled in vinegar), red-ripe fresh fruits, dried whole fruit, and dried fruit with the seeds removed, with heat levels arranged from hottest to mildest in that order. Around 50 tons are estimated to be harvested commercially annually in Mexico, primarily in Sonora.

In Mexico, the heat of the chiltepin is called arrebatado ("rapid" or "violent"), because, while the heat is intense, it is not very enduring. This stands in contrast to the domesticated 'Pequin' variety, which is the same size as the wild tepin, but is oval-shaped, and delivers a decidedly different experience.

The different drying methods used for the tepin and 'Pequin', can help tell these peppers apart. Tepins are always sun-dried, whereas the Pequins are commonly dried over wood smoke, and the smell of the smoke in the Pequins can help separate the two varieties. Pequins are not as hot as chiltepins (only about 30,000–50,000 Scoville units), but they have a much slower and longer-lasting effect.

== Habitat and range ==
C. annuum var. glabriusculum is native to the Sonoran-Arizonan desert and can be found in Texas, Arizona, Louisiana and Florida in the Southern United States, the Bahamas, the Caribbean, Mexico, Central America, and Colombia. It prefers well-drained soils, such as silty or sandy loams, and 800–2,000 mm (31–79 in) of annual precipitation in Puerto Rico. It may be found in areas with a broken forest canopy or disturbed areas that lack tree cover if moisture and soil are favorable. Elsewhere, such as in Arizona, it may require the partial shading of a nurse plant.

== Symbolism ==
Chiltepin was named "the official native pepper of Texas" in 1997, two years after the jalapeño became the official pepper of Texas.

== Conservation ==
In 1999, Native Seeds/SEARCH and the United States Forest Service established the 2,500-acre (1,000 ha) Wild Chile Botanical Area in the Coronado National Forest. Located in the Rock Corral Canyon near Tumacacori, Arizona, the preserve protects a large C. annuum var. glabriusculum population for study and as a genetic reserve.

== See also ==
- List of Capsicum cultivars
- Capsicum annuum
- Capsicum
