= Red Savina pepper =

Chili pepper

Red Savina
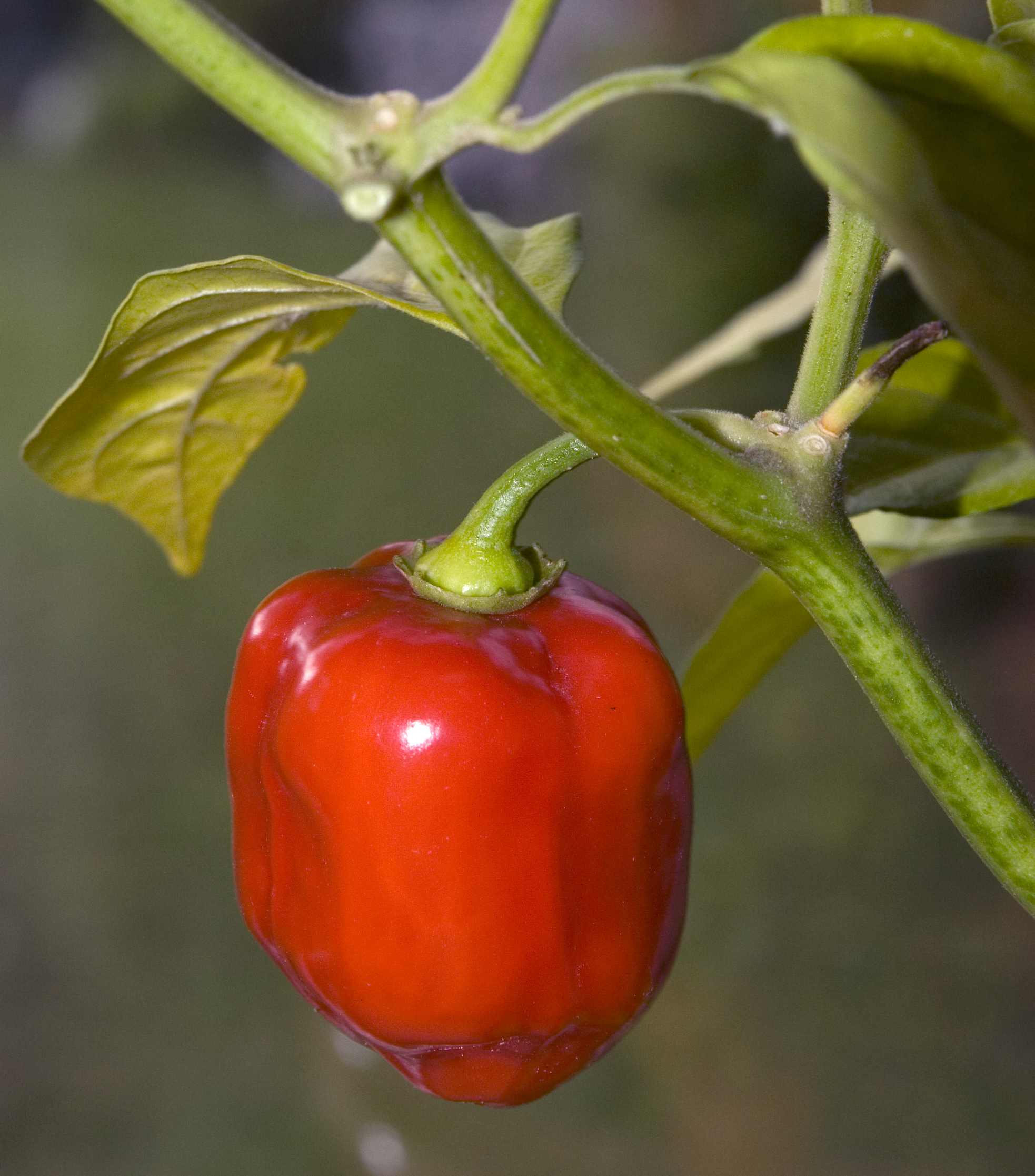
- Red Savina habanero
- Species: Capsicum chinense
- Cultivar: 'Red Savina'
- Origin: California, United States
- Heat: Very hot
- Scoville scale: 350,000–577,000 SHU

The Red Savina pepper is a cultivar of the habanero chili (Capsicum chinense Jacquin), which has been selectively bred to produce spicier, heavier, and larger fruit, ultimately more potent than its derivative.

Frank Garcia of GNS Spices, in Walnut, California, is credited as the developer of the Red Savina, but the exact methodology that Garcia used to select the hottest breeding strains is not publicly known.

== Description ==
The Red Savina typically measures 2 inches by 1.5 inches (5 x 3.5 cm), and is described by cultivators as a "wrinkled" fruit with a "Chinese lantern" shape. Unlike a conventional orange habanero, the Red Savina is distinctively dark red, and may have been bred using spicy red mutations of habanero. Until 2011, it was protected by the U.S. Plant Variety Protection Act (PVP #9200255).

== Pungency ==
The Red Savina chili held the record as the hottest chili in the world according to the Guinness World Records from 1994–2006. It was displaced by the bhut jolokia chili (commonly and incorrectly translated to "Ghost Pepper") in February 2007.

Red Savina peppers were reported to allegedly score upwards of 577,000 on the Scoville scale, but this oft-quoted figure was never officially verified; a group of researchers – including Regents Professor Paul W. Bosland at the Chile Pepper Institute at New Mexico State University – conducted a comparison experiment in 2005, which revealed that the Red Savina habanero averages a relative heat level of 248,556 SHUs. The CPI lists the spiciest Red Savina individuals recorded in their labs as approximately 500,000 SHUs.

As a point of reference, the average orange habanero scores approximately 200,000 SHUs in high performance liquid chromatography tests (although some individuals have achieved on the order of 357,729 SHUs). The average bhut jolokia is 1,019,687 SHUs, and "blasted past" the Red Savina by a factor of 2 to emerge as the temporary title-holder. However, the current Guinness World Record title-holder (as of August 2023), the Pepper X, has scored a maximum value of 2,693,000 SHUs.

== See also ==
- Race to grow the hottest pepper
- Scoville scale
- Bhut jolokia, the Red Savina's successor for "World's Hottest Chile"
- Pepper X, the current title-holder for "World's Hottest Chile"
