= Pequin pepper =

Chili pepper cultivar

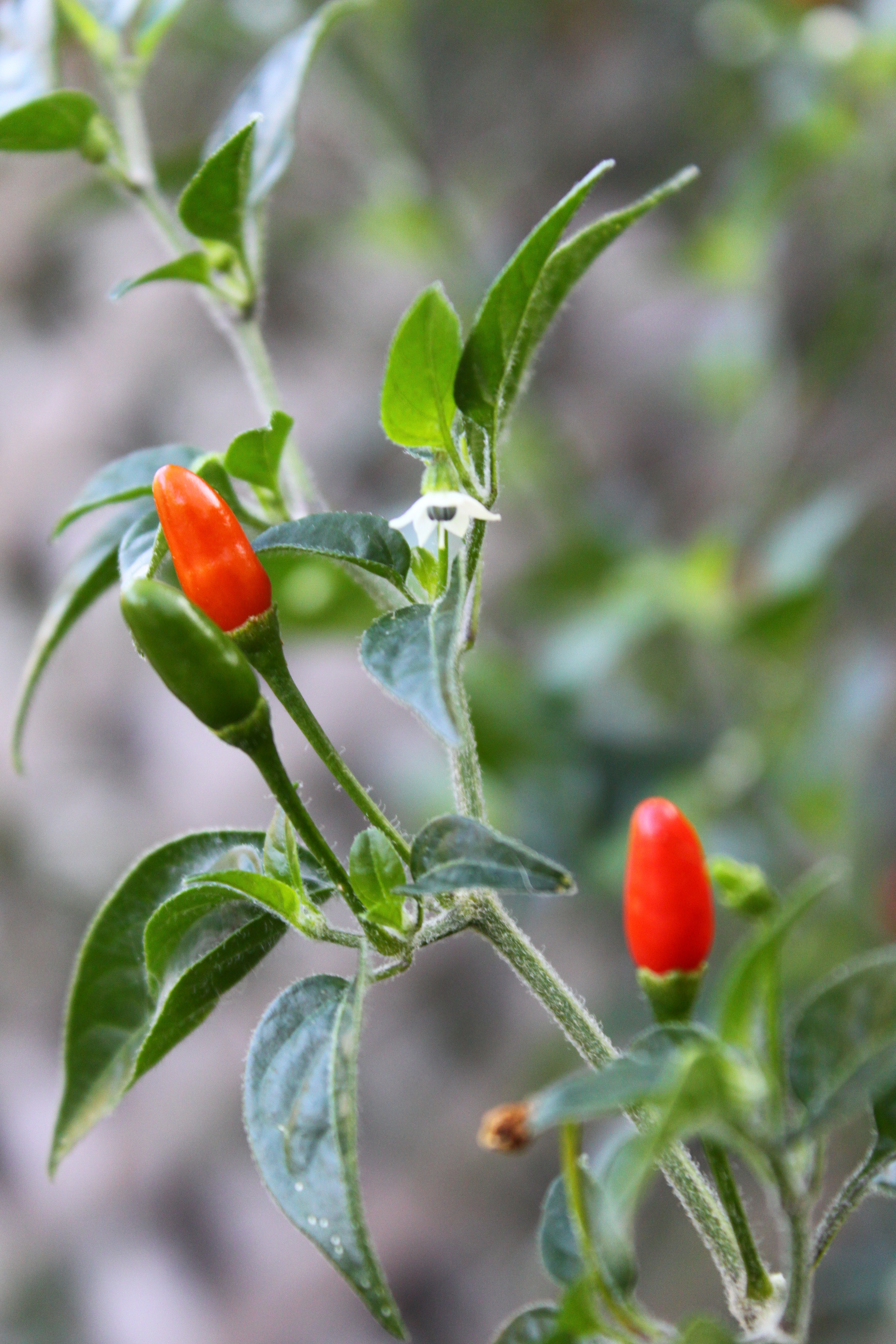
- Closeup of fruits, foliage, and flower
- Species: Capsicum annuum
- Cultivar: Pequin
- Heat: Hot
- Scoville scale: 30,000–60,000 SHU

Pequin (or piquín) pepper (/pɪˈkiːn/) is a hot chili pepper cultivar commonly used as a spice. Pequin peppers are hot, often 5–8 times hotter than jalapeños on the Scoville scale (30,000 to 60,000 Units). Its flavor is described as citrusy and nutty.

Taxonomically, it is classified within variety glabriusculum of the species Capsicum annuum.

The pequin pepper originates in the Mexican state of Tabasco, where it is widely used to make salsa or as a complement to many dishes. It is also known as chile pequín / chile petín / chiltepe (in Guatemala and El Salvador), chile congo (in Nicaragua and northern region of Costa Rica), chile de monte / chile del monte / chile mosquito / mashito (by the Chontal/Maya natives in Tabasco), amash / timpinchile (in Chiapas), chilpaya (in Veracruz), maax'ik (in Yucatán) and chile kipín (in Huasteca).

Pequin peppers are compact, growing typically 0.3–0.6 meters tall, with bright green, ovate leaves and small berries that rarely exceed 2 cm in length. Like most chilies, the berries start out green, ripening to brilliant red at maturity.

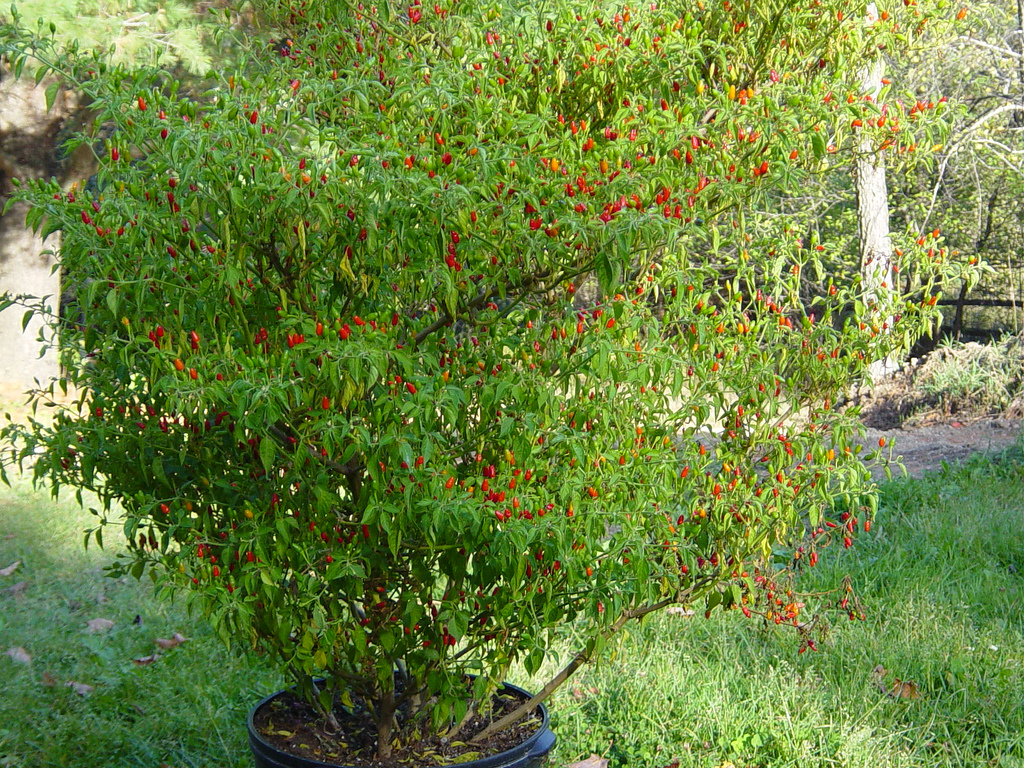
Foliage and ripe fruits

The name pequin is thought to come from the Spanish pequeño, meaning small. Its fruit is oblong and is found in the wild from the American Southwest to the Andes. It is grown both wild and commercially harvested in Mexico.

Common uses include pickling, salsas, sauces, soups, and vinegars. The Cholula brand hot sauce lists piquin peppers and chile de árbol peppers among its ingredients.

Pequin peppers are highly valued in Mexico, often costing more than 10 times the price of other peppers, but their cultivation is limited due to low seed germination (15% average germination rate) and susceptibility to disease. Pequins prefer moderate shade levels (35% shade) and daily watering, though they are drought tolerant. In the wild, pequins grow in the understory of trees as perennials; under cultivation, they are grown as annuals as disease susceptibilities limits their growth. Seeds germinate in 7 to 28 days, require 60 to 90 days for seedling development, and require 90 to 100 days after transplant to produce commercial fruit.

== Climate ==
The plant is found at elevations between sea level and 1300 meters, in high evergreen and low evergreen rainforests, low deciduous forests, and deciduous forests.

The populations of wild chili are widely distributed throughout the Mexican territory. It is possible to find them in undisturbed sites of the low deciduous forest, as well as along roads, in orchards, pastures and under the remaining vegetation on the banks of cultivation fields. In order to grow properly it must have a daily temperature between 18 and 30 °C, with a night range of 15 to 21 °C, the minimum range for germination and seedling growth is 15 °C. The necessary conditions for its development are under shade or semi-shade, low brightness, shallow ground. Its height, branching and radical system increases if the luminosity is low. If damaged by frost, pruning off the top may allow for the plant to sprout again if the roots were not damaged.

== See also ==
- List of Capsicum cultivars
