= Centre for Genetic Resources, the Netherlands =

National genebank of the Netherlands

The Centre for Genetic Resources, the Netherlands (CGN) is the national genebank of the Netherlands. It was established in 1986 by the Dutch Ministry of Agriculture and is administered by Wageningen University & Research. CGN conserves the genetic diversity of crops, farm animals and trees, and maintains passport and characterisation data on its collections.

== Collections ==
CGN's plant collection held about 23,000 accessions as of 2019, with a focus on vegetables; each accession is identified by a "CGN" number. Among its holdings is a Capsicum (pepper) collection of roughly 1,200 accessions of the cultivated species and their wild relatives, one of the larger pepper collections in Europe. The centre originally worked only with plant genetic resources; it later gained mandates for farm animal genetic resources (from 1999) and for indigenous trees and shrubs (from 2004).

CGN takes part in international networks for the conservation and exchange of plant genetic resources and shares data through platforms such as Genesys and the Global Biodiversity Information Facility.
