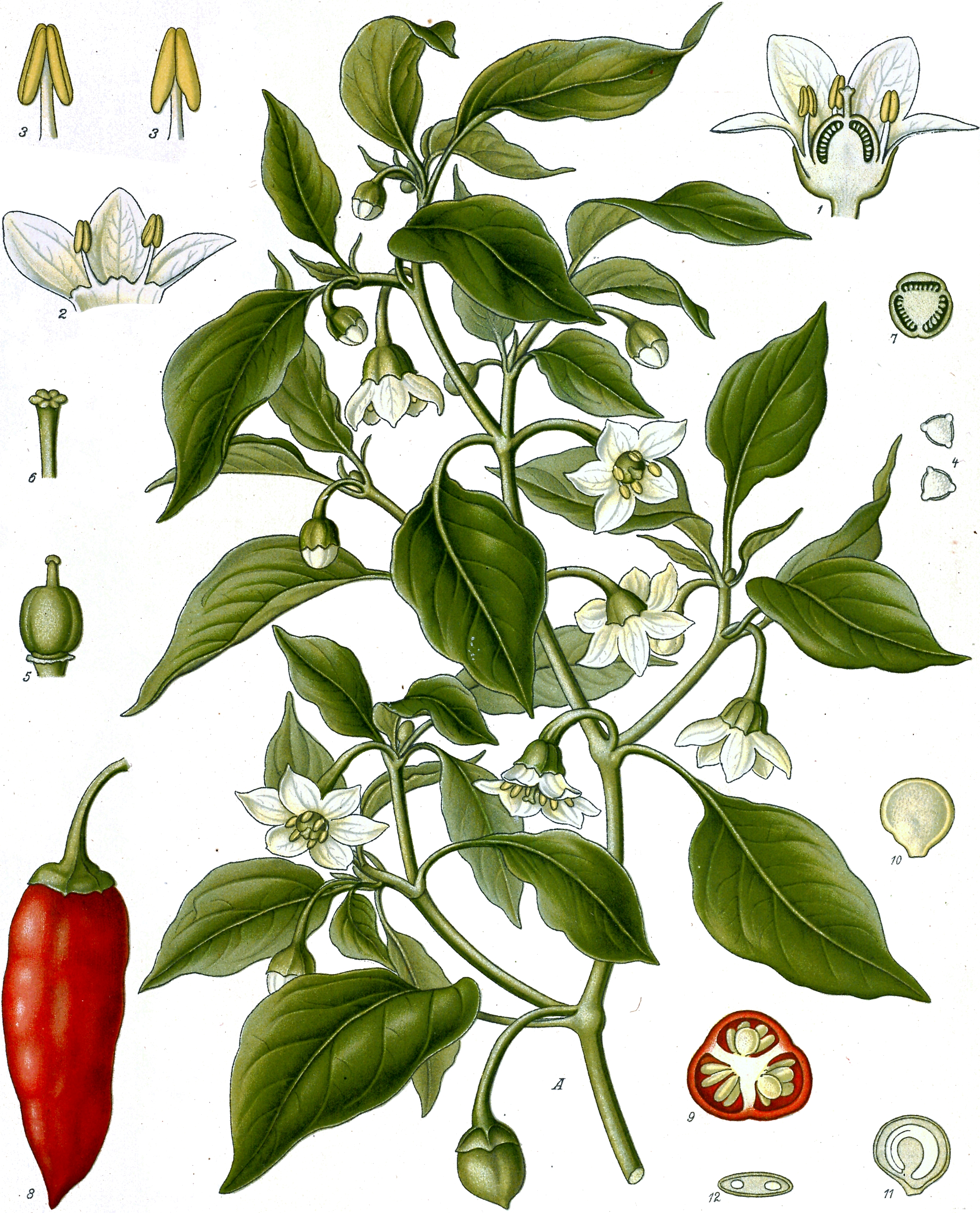

Conservation status
- Least Concern (IUCN 3.1)

Scientific classification
- Kingdom: Plantae
- Clade: Tracheophytes
- Clade: Angiosperms
- Clade: Eudicots
- Clade: Asterids
- Order: Solanales
- Family: Solanaceae
- Genus: Capsicum
- Species: C. annuum

Binomial name
- Capsicum annuum L.

Varieties and Groups
- C. annuum var. annuum; C. annuum var. glabriusculum; C. annuum var. grossum; C. annuum var. longum; C. annuum var. longum grossum; C. annuum var. lycopersiciforme rubrum; Capsicum annuum var. bola (aka var. ñora); Capsicum annuum 'New Mexico Group'

= Capsicum annuum =

Species of flowering plant in the nightshade family

Capsicum annuum is a flowering plant in the family Solanaceae (nightshades), native to the northern regions of South America and to southwestern North America. The plant produces berries of many colors including red, green, and yellow, often with pungent taste. It is one of the oldest cultivated crops, with domestication dating back to around 6,000 years ago in regions of Mexico. The genus Capsicum has over 30 species but Capsicum annuum is the primary species in its genus, as it has been widely cultivated for human consumption for a substantial amount of time and has spread across the world. This species has many uses in culinary and ornamental applications.

== Name ==
The genus name Capsicum derives from a Greek-based derivative of the Latin word capto, meaning 'to grasp, to seize', in reference to the heat or pungency of the species' fruit, although it has also been speculated to derive from the Latin word capsa, 'box', referring to the shape of the fruit in forms of the typical species. Although the species name annuum means 'annual' (from the Latin annus, 'year'), the plant is not an annual but is frost tender. In the absence of winter frosts it can survive several seasons and grow into a large, shrubby perennial herb.

Common names including the word pepper stem from a misconception on the part of Europeans taking part in the Columbian exchange. They mistakenly thought the spicy fruits were a variety of the black pepper plant, which also has spicy fruit. However, these two plants are not closely related. Commonly used names for the fruit of Capsicum annuum in English vary by location and cultivar. The larger, sweeter cultivars are called "capsicum" in Australia and New Zealand. In Great Britain and Ireland, cultivars of the plant are typically discussed in groups of either "sweet" or "hot/chilli" peppers, only rarely providing the specific cultivar. In Canada and the United States it is commonplace to provide the cultivar in most instances, for example "bell", "jalapeño", "cayenne", or "bird's eye" peppers, to convey differences in taste including sweetness or pungency.

== Characteristics ==
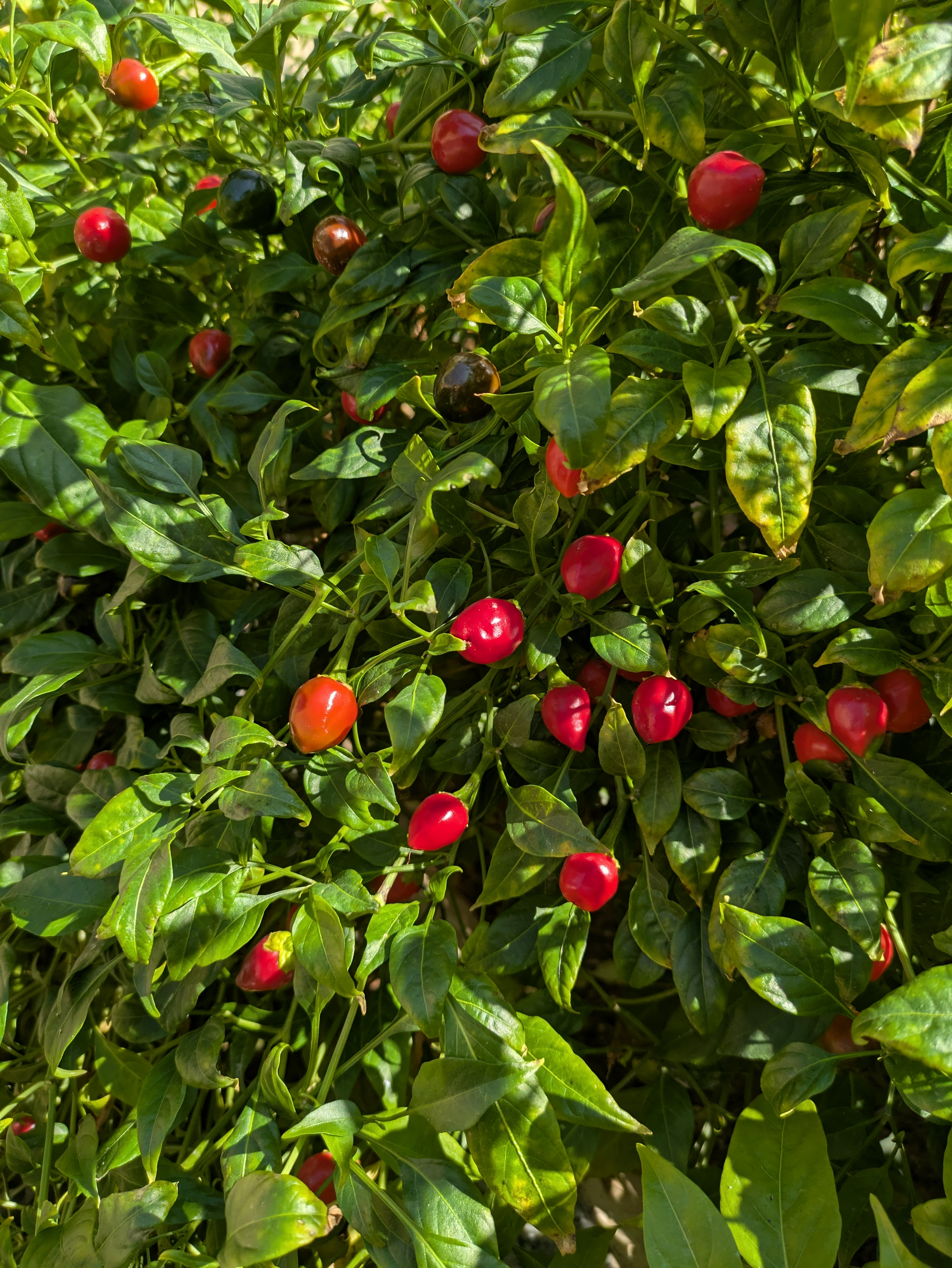
Capsicum annuum fruits

Capsicum annuum cultivars look like small shrubs with many branches and thin stems, with a tendency to climb. Some varieties can grow up to two meters tall (6.56 feet) using others to climb on. The shrub has oval glossy leaves sometimes growing to 7.5 cm (3 inches) in length; while generally green, depending on the cultivar the leaves can turn dark purple or black as the plant ages. Capsicum annuum are annual or biennial herbaceous plants that have a life cycle consisting of four stages (seedling, vegetation, flowering, and fruiting.) Being a flowering plant with variations there are different shapes of flowers and fruits produced on individuals typically having star or bell shaped flowers coming in a range of colors including purple, white, and green. Just as the flowers, the fruits of this species comes in various shapes (berry shape to bell pepper shape), and colors including red, yellow, green, and black.

=== Chiltepin pepper ===
Variants of this species also have the ability to produce and retain capsaicinoid compounds giving their fruits a powerful (spicy) taste which can vary in strengths. One semi-domesticated variation of Capsicum annuum is a variety named Capsicum annuum L. var. glabriusculum (Chiltepin peppers). It grows white flowers and produces berry fruits that are red when mature. Similar to other variants the Chiltepin pepper produces and contains capsaicin which is responsible for its intense heat ranging from 100,000 to 200,000 Scoville heat units making it one of the hottest fruits grown in Mexico.

=== Bell pepper ===
Another variant of Capsicum annuum, the bell pepper, is quite different from Chiltepin peppers, being described as "sweet", as it does not contain high concentrations of capsaicin and is rated a 0 on the Scoville heat scale. Bell peppers grow on shrub body plants, and the fruits are large, quadrangular, and fleshy. They can also grow to a weight of 500 grams and come in many colors, including yellow, orange, red, and green.

== Domestication ==
Capsicum annuum today have many variations of fruits, the origin of which is estimated to be from indigenous peoples of Mesoamerica around 6,000 years ago using selective breeding to domesticate wild forms of the peppers. Scientists have also found remnants of wild peppers ancestral to modern Capsicum annuum varieties in various locations and caves in places such as the Oaxaca Valley in Mexico, which has led researchers to believe that wild chili peppers were consumed before their domestication dating back to more than 8,000 years ago.

Domestication of crops using conscious and unconscious selective methods usually leads to a decrease in the plants natural defensive traits. This has not always held true for Capsicum annuum, as some variants have been bred to increase the defensive compound capsaicin, making the fruit more powerful. Capsicum annuum have also experienced "domestication syndrome" leading to several morphological and phytochemical changes leading to increased fruit and/or seed size, changes in reproductive cycles, and changes in plant structure. However, as a consequence of the cultivation of the wild species, some variants have experienced decreased fitness, leaving them vulnerable (and unlikely to survive) when not being cultivated.

== Pollination ==
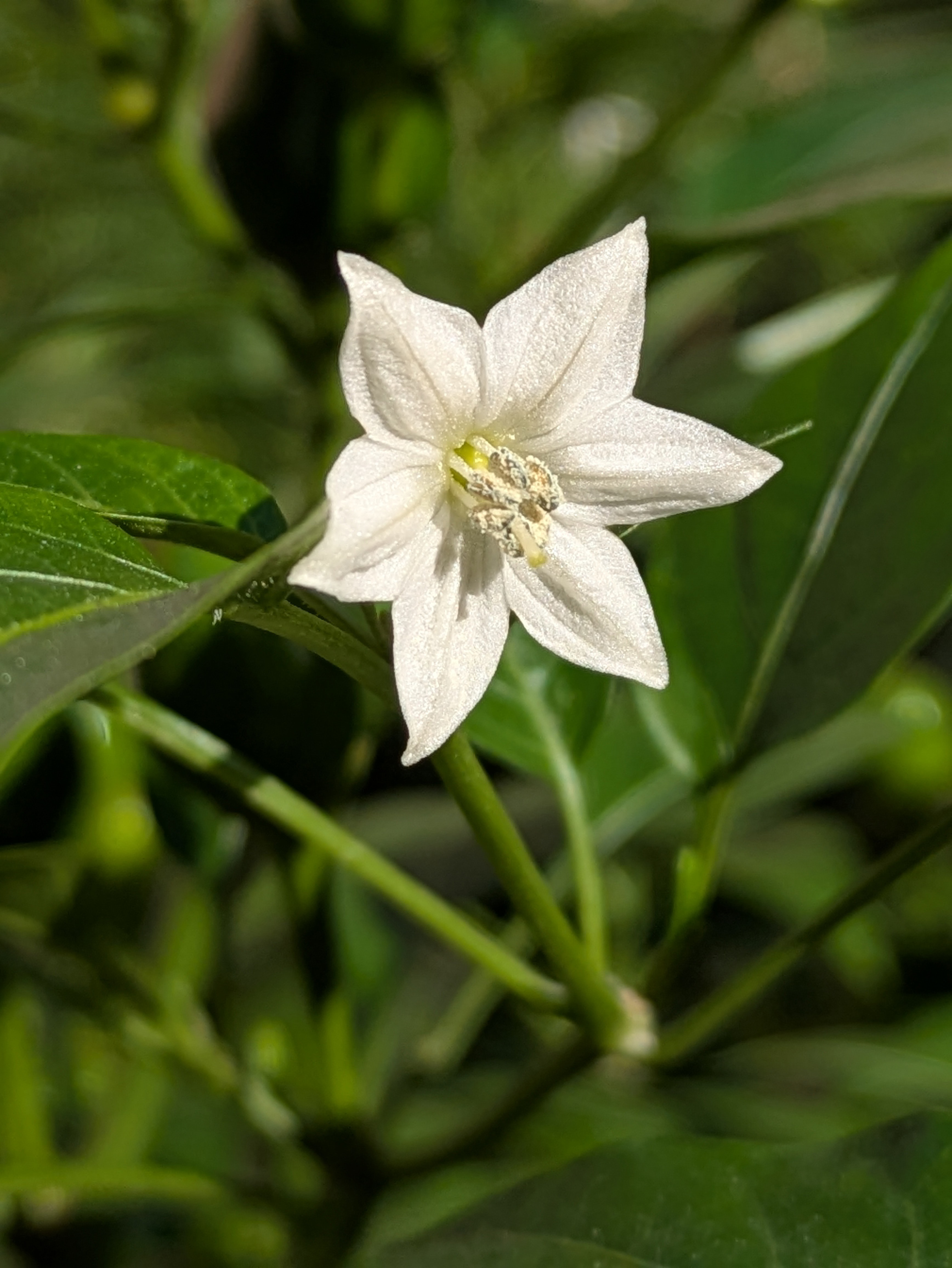
Capsicum annuum flower in Behbahan

Flowers of Capsicum annuum generally consist of 6–7 petals and sepals, have 7 stamens, and contain an ovary that is superior to a single style consisting of 2–3 carpels and a single stamen.

Members are self pollinators, but cross pollination often occurs when plants are grown in large quantities, via bees, wasps, and ants. In commercial production of Capsicum annuum, human pollination is often used to produce hybrid seeds that can grow into new variants of the pepper, which is a form of selective breeding that demonstrates how the pepper was domesticated.

Within the flowers there are several reproductive structures that are used in pollination and fertilization, the two relative include the anthers and the ovary. Anthers are the male organ producing the microgametes (pollen) that will disperse to fertilize the megagamete that is located in the ovary of the female reproductive organ, leading to the development of the propagule (fruit).

After fertilization the fruit of the plant begins to develop which is determined by the specific variety that is being grown. The fruit grows to maturity, then is ready for dispersal of its seeds.

== Seed dispersal ==
The seeds of some varieties of Capsicum annuum are coated in the compound capsaicin. This was a defensive mechanism of wild chilis before their domestication roughly 6,000 years ago. Capsaicin is a compound that can be extremely powerful depending on the concentration, and this was used to protect the seeds from predation, and increase their chance of survival. However, birds are not affected by the presence of capsaicin and are able to eat the fruits and seeds. The seeds are then passed through the birds' digestive system and dispersed to new environments via defecation.

Bird dispersal for seeds has proven to be beneficial for the peppers as they have the ability to spread large distances. One example of this is the wild chiltepin, which has a massive range of habitat from Northern Peru to Southwestern United States.

== Uses ==
Capsicum annuum has been widely cultivated and modified through breeding for certain traits, which allows them to be used in multiple applications. These include in food, traditional medicine, cosmetics, and even self defense (pepper spray).

=== Culinary ===
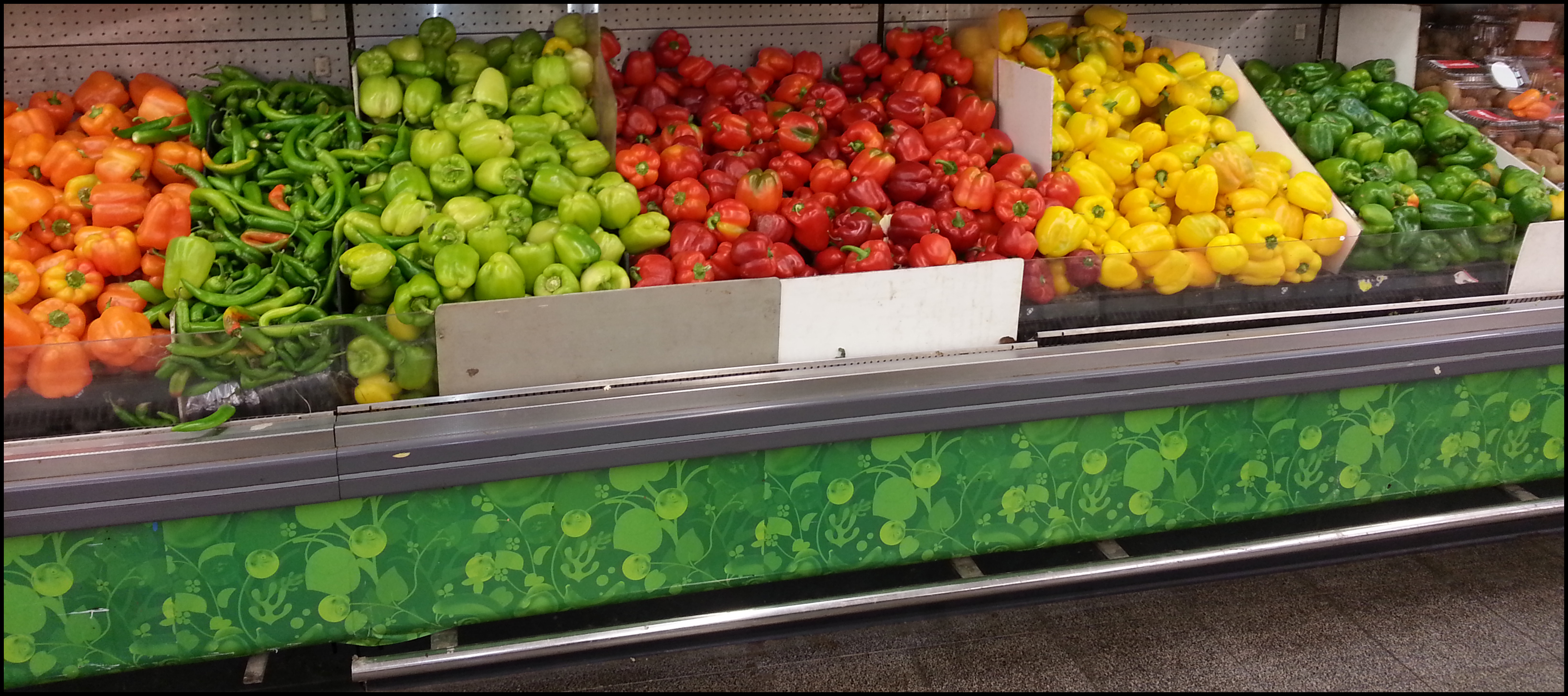
Five colors of peppers in a supermarket

There are multiple ways this species can be used in food, including fresh, dried, pickled, and powdered. Peppers are widely used in traditional Mexican cuisine to create dishes such as Oaxacan black mole. Along with their flavor and coloring properties, the peppers contain micronutrients, including vitamins A and C and B vitamins.

The species is a source of sweet peppers and hot chilis, with numerous varieties cultivated worldwide, and is the source of spices, such as cayenne, chili, pimentón and paprika powders, as well as pimiento (pimento). Capsinoid chemicals provide the distinctive tastes in C. annuum variants. In particular, capsaicin creates a burning sensation ("hotness").

=== Traditional medicine ===
In old civilizations such as the Mayan and Aztec, capsicum species including C. annuum were used with the intent to treat many illnesses, including as a decoction consumed in Caribbean regions during the 20th century.

=== Ornamental ===
Some cultivars grown specifically for their aesthetic value include the U.S. National Arboretum's "Black Pearl".

== Pests ==
Even with its defensive strategies, Capsicum annuum can still fall victim to several pests and viruses. Some can harbor viruses deadly to the species, these include whiteflies and aphids. Another pest which is quite vicious is a weevil (Anthonomus eugenii Cano) which the larva of this pest affects the plants during the flowering and fruiting stages of its life, and can reduce its production rate by up to 90%. Other pests that can cause damage to the plants are the tobacco budworms and thrips. Diseases include phytophthora blight, anthracnose, phytophthora root and basal rot.

== Gallery ==
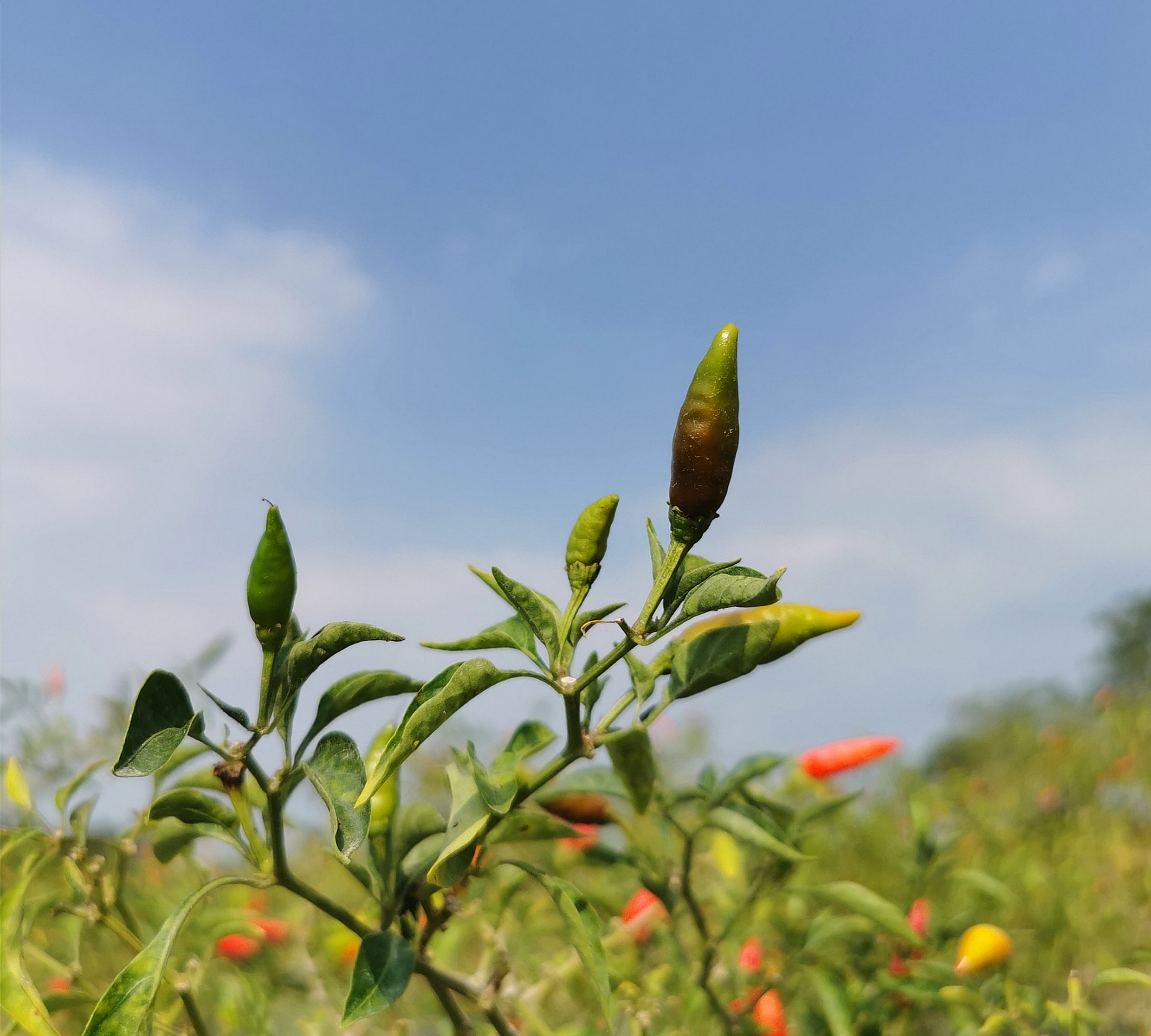
Capsicum annuum L var. fasciculatum Irish

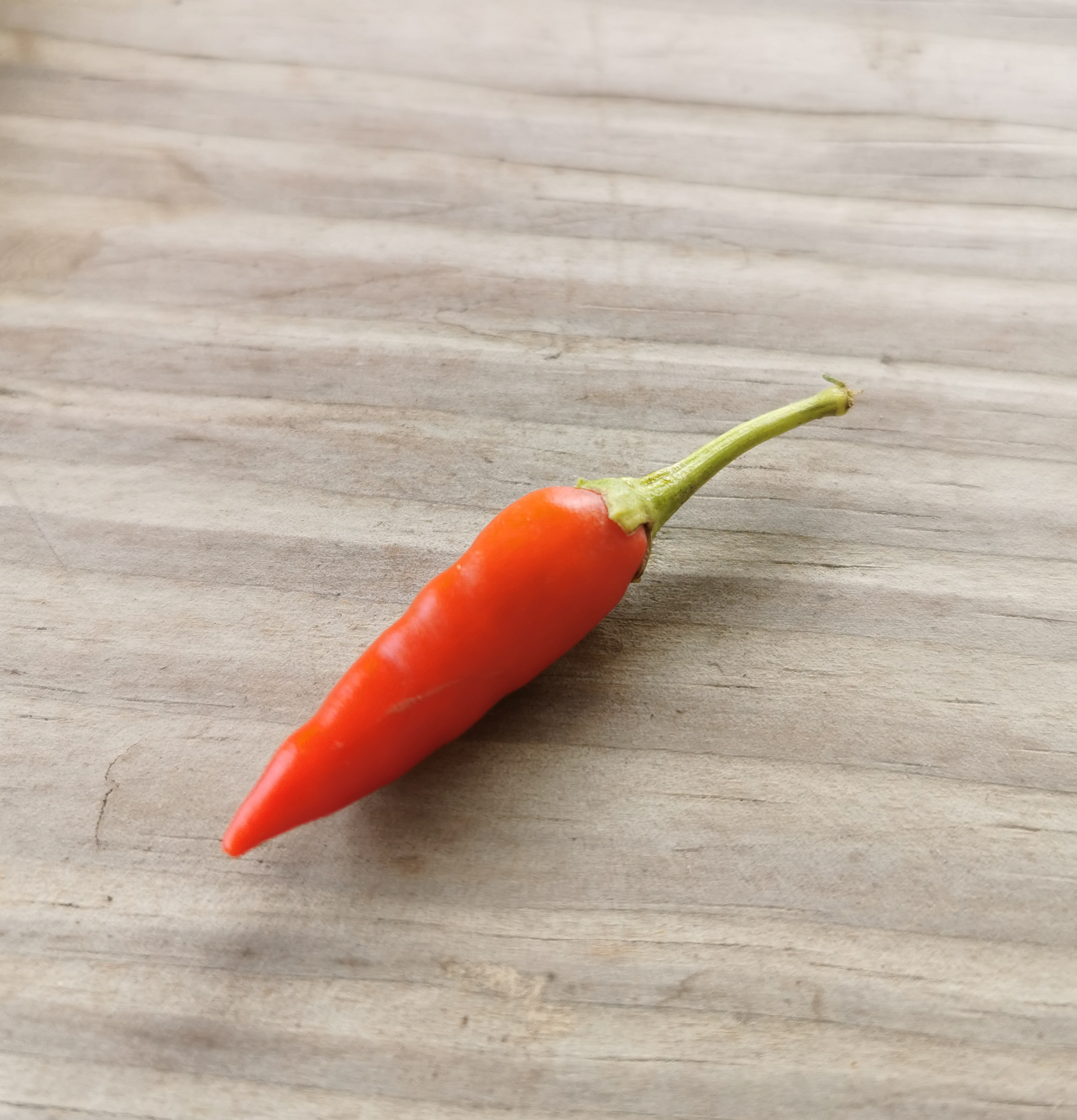
Capsicum annuum L. var. fasciculatum Irish

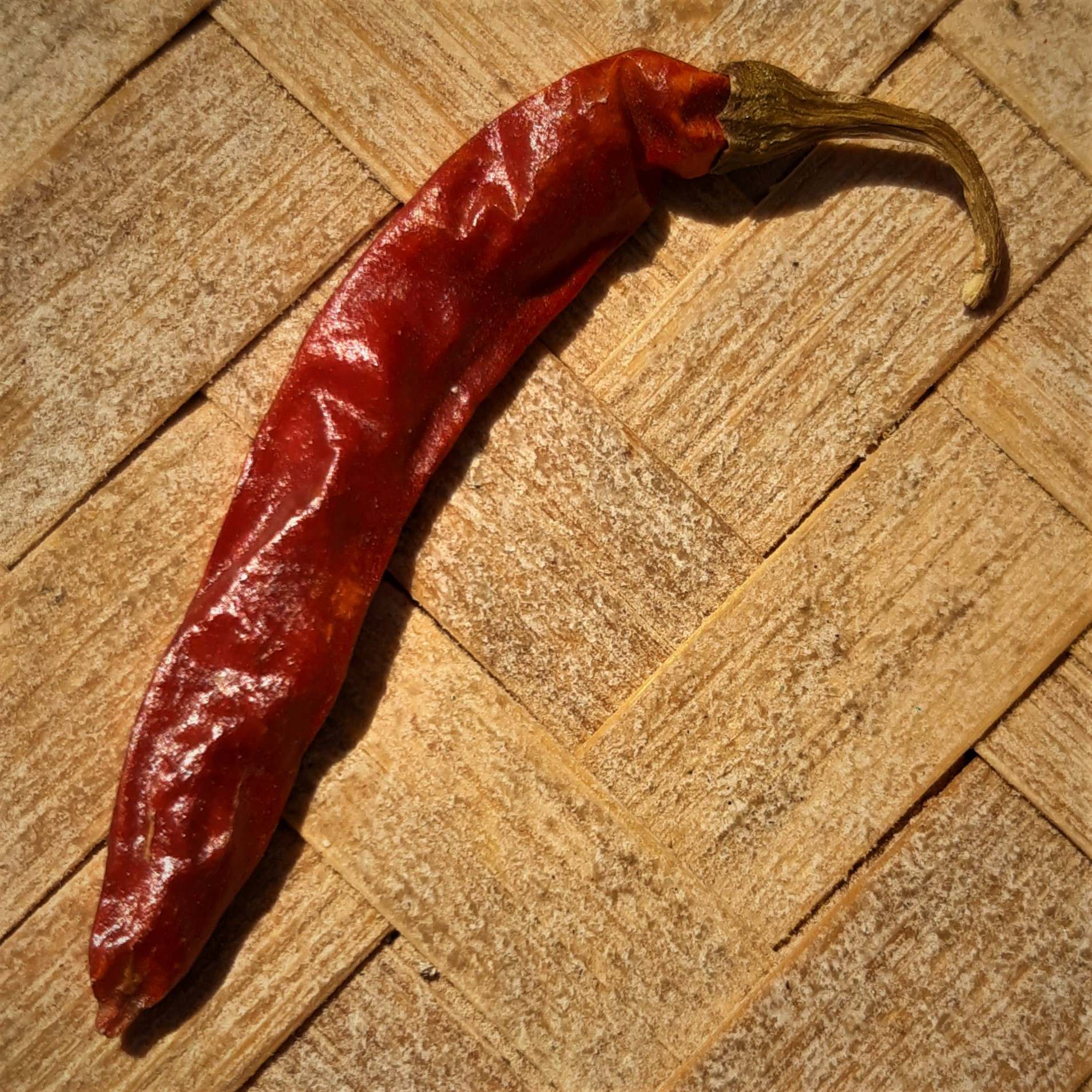
Dried Capsicum annuum Red chili pepper

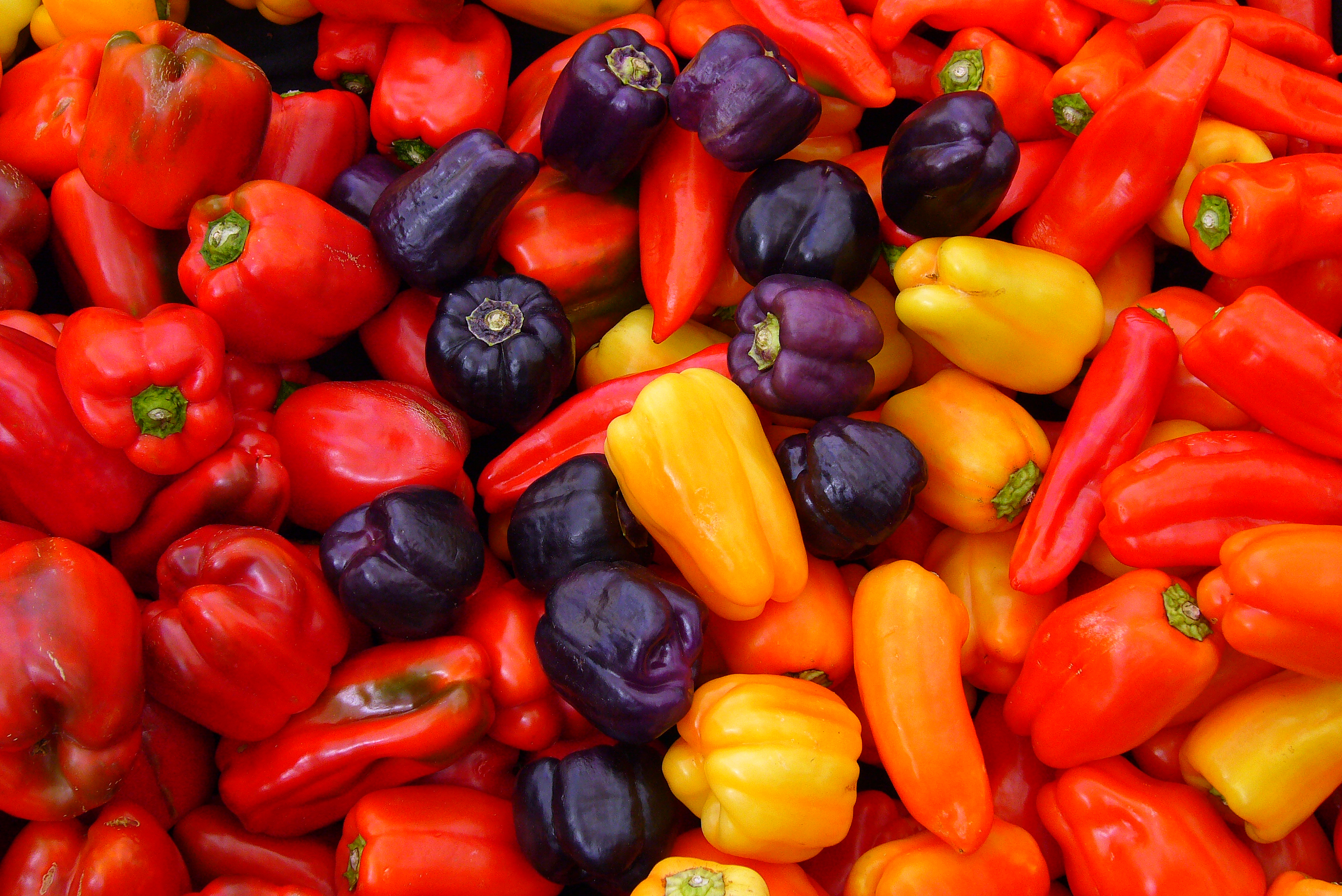
Capsicum annuum cultivars

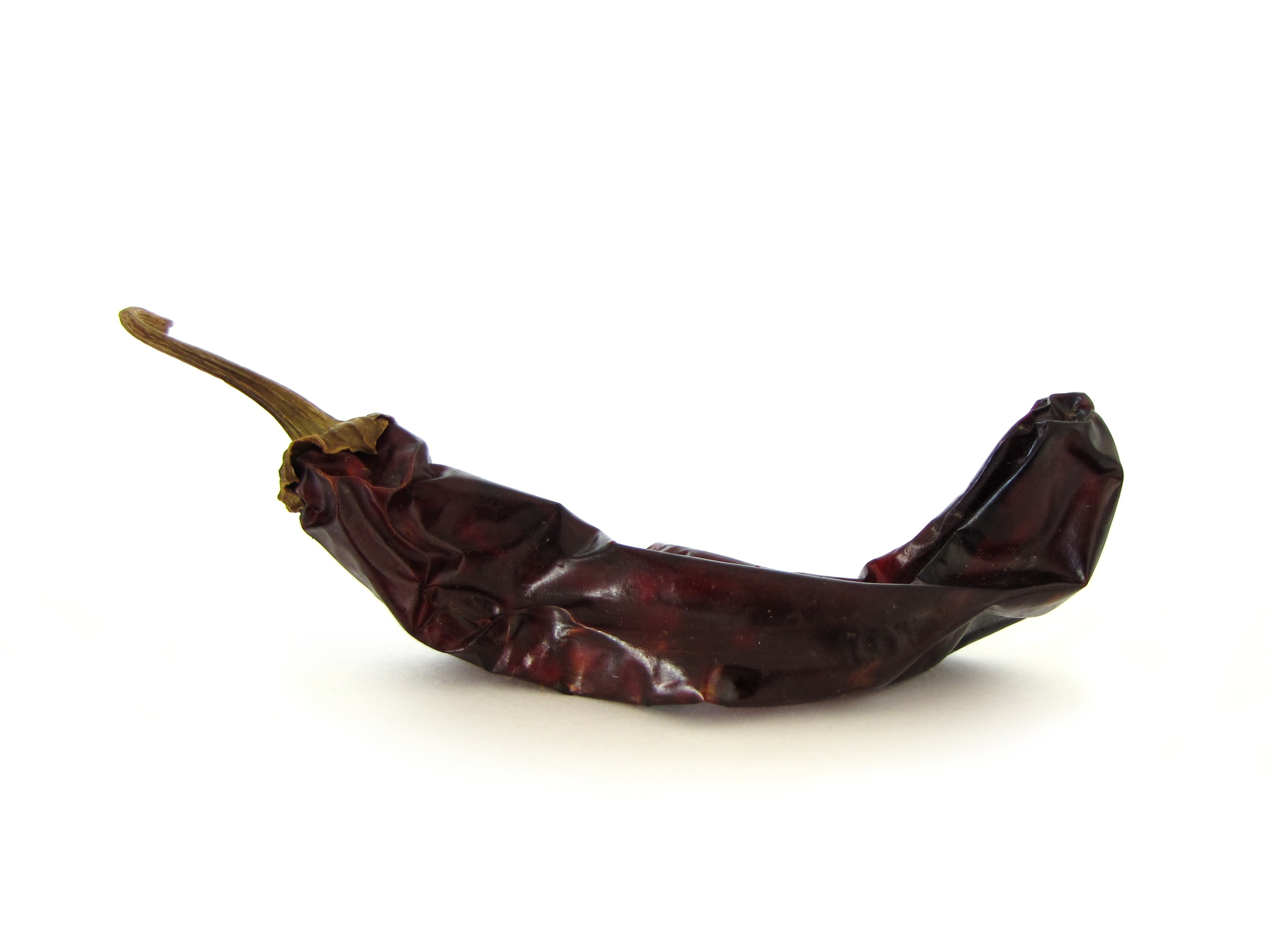
Dried Guajillo chili pod

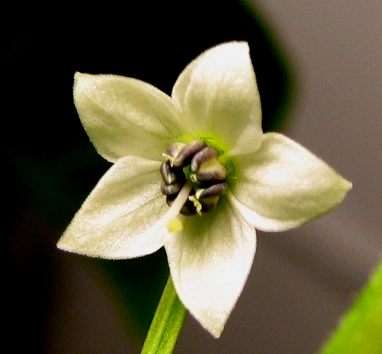
Typical Capsicum annuum flower, Royal Embers

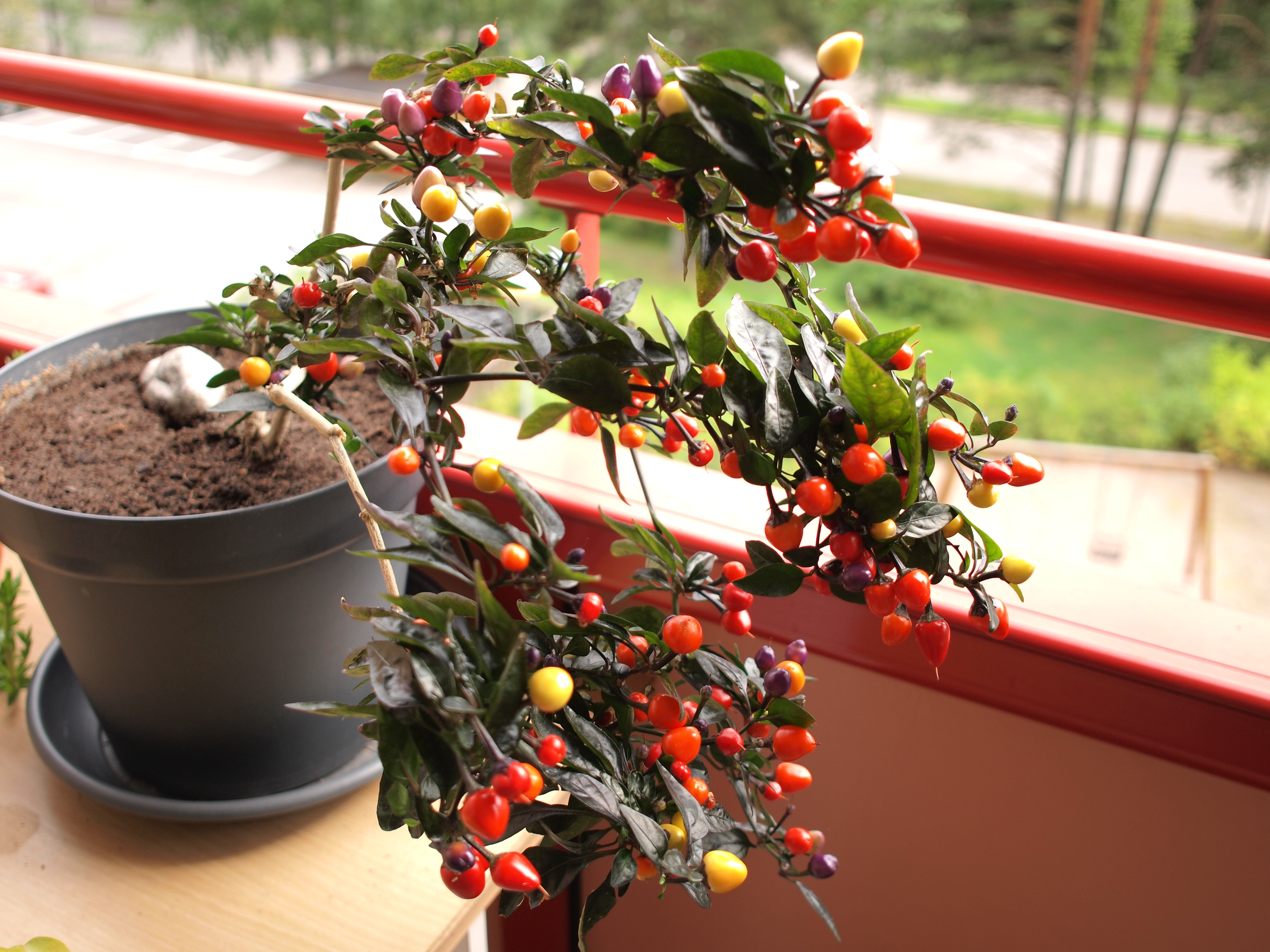
Bolivian Rainbow with its fruits in different stages of ripeness

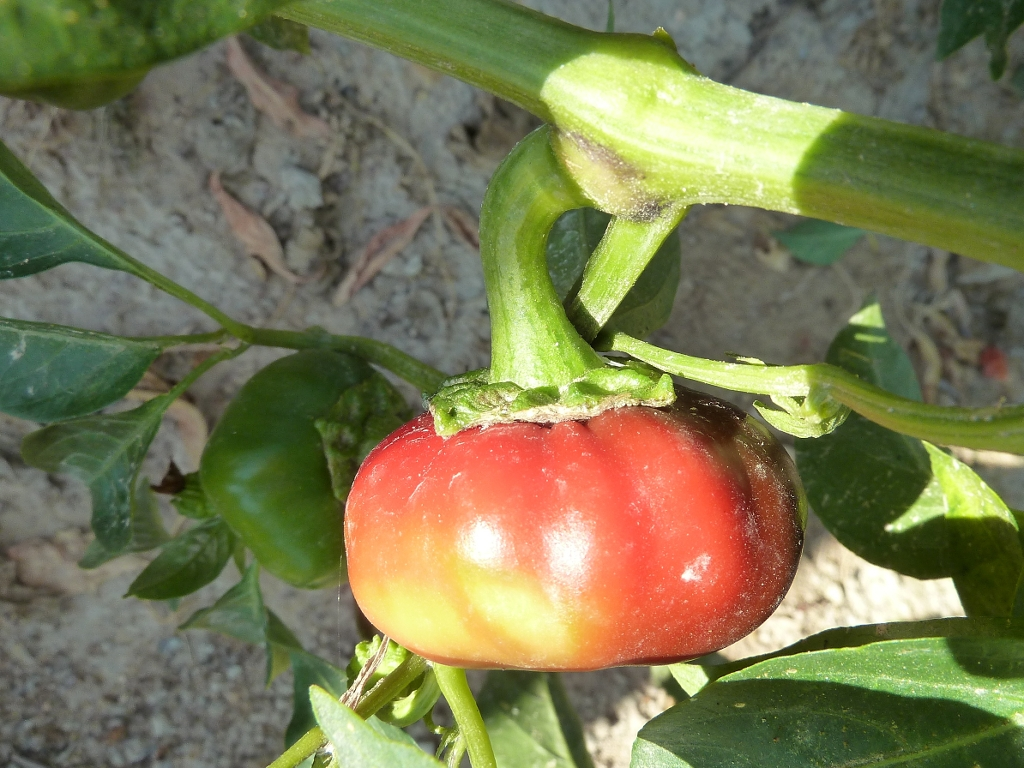
Capsicum annuum var. bola or ñora

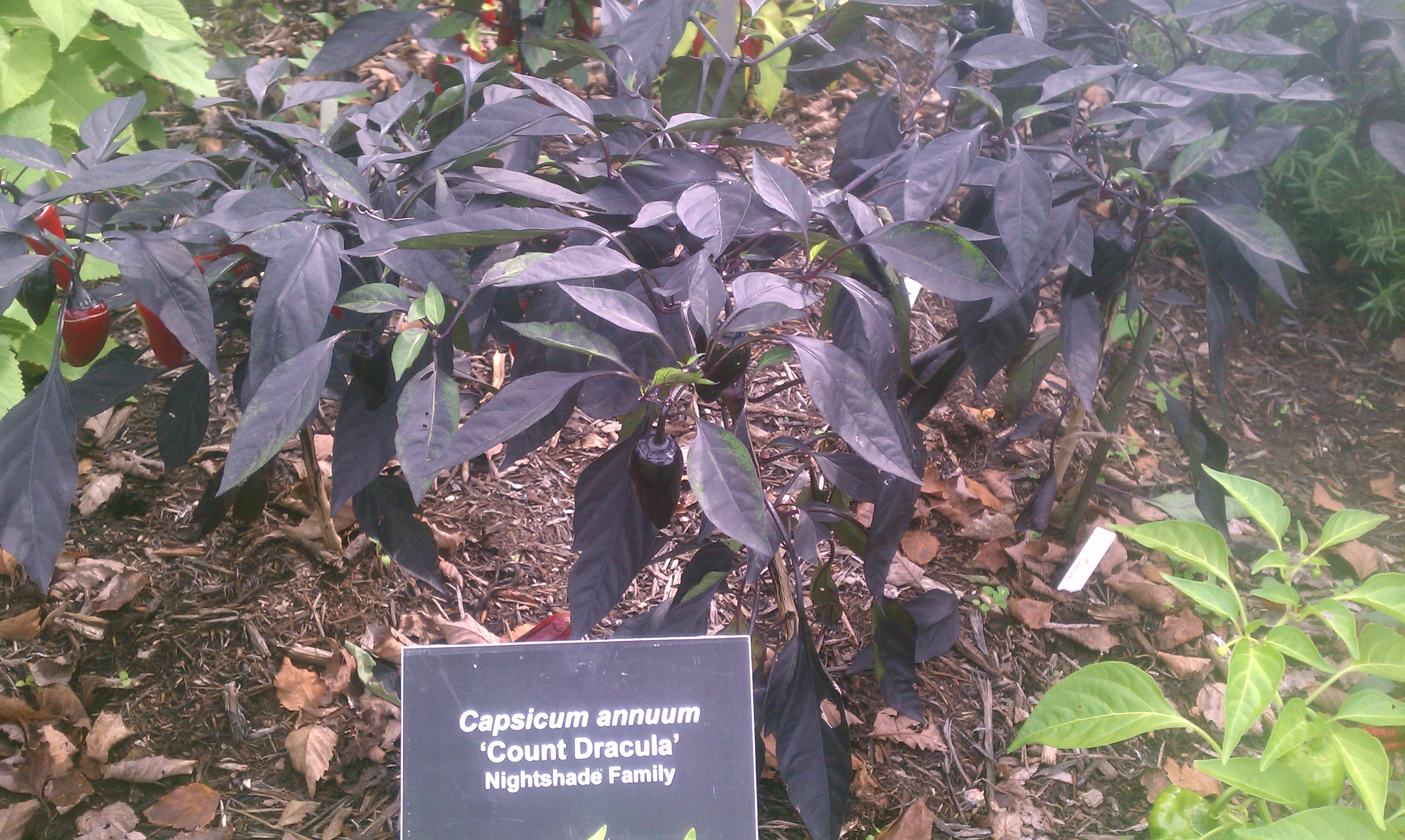
Capsicum annuum Count Dracula

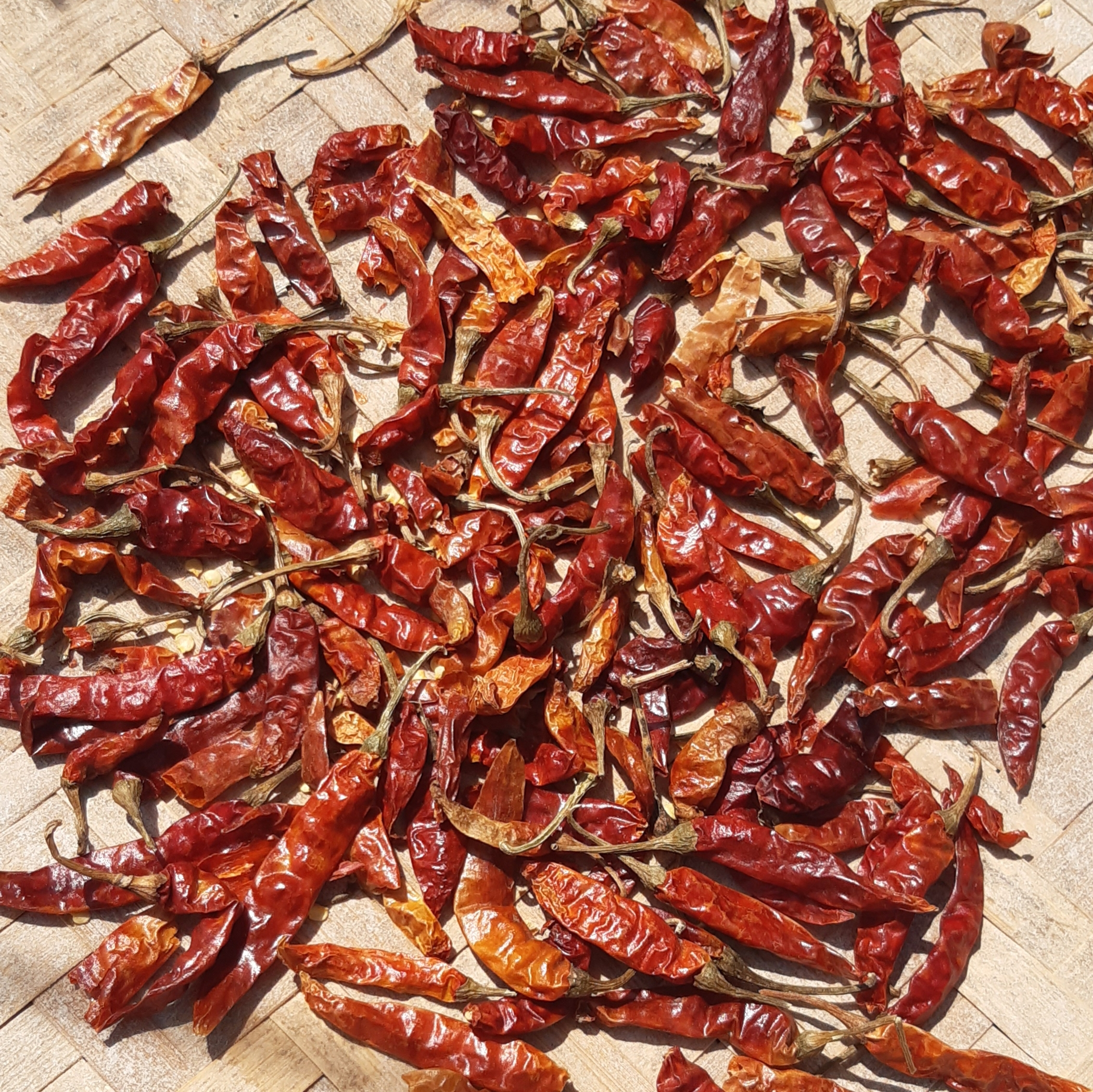
Dried Capsicum annuum Red chili pepper on Nanglo

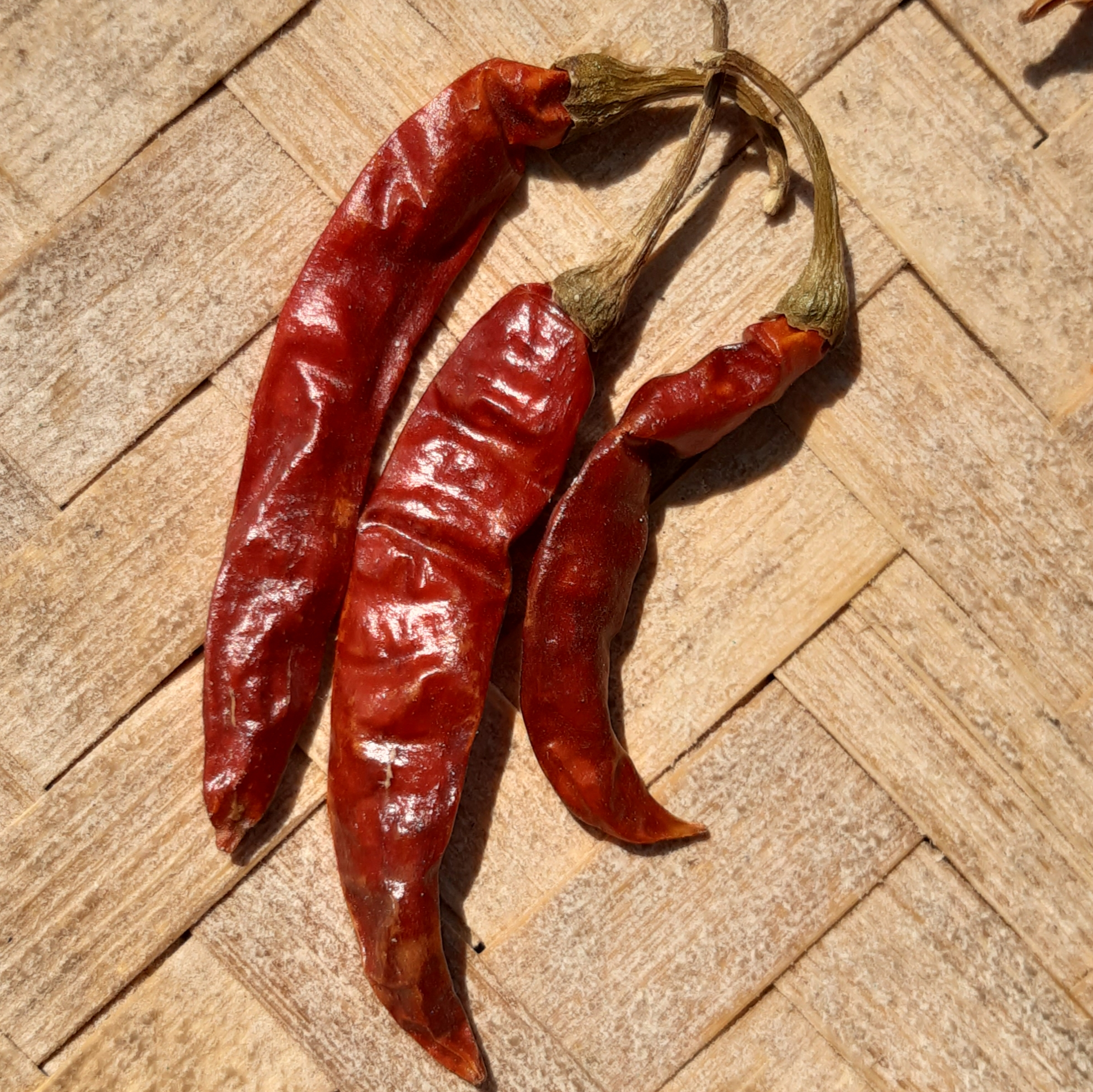
Dried Capsicum annuum Red chili pepper

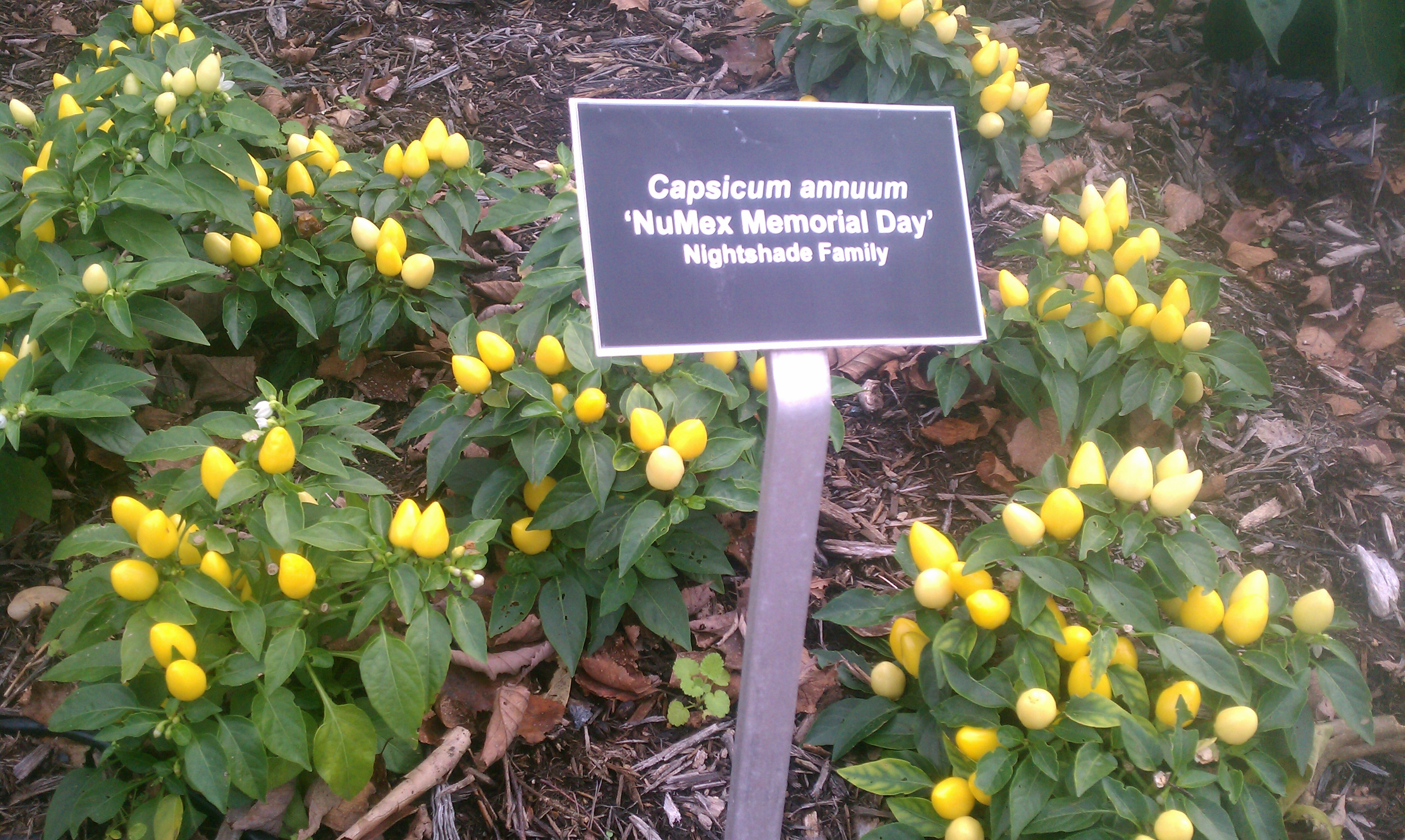
NuMex Memorial Day

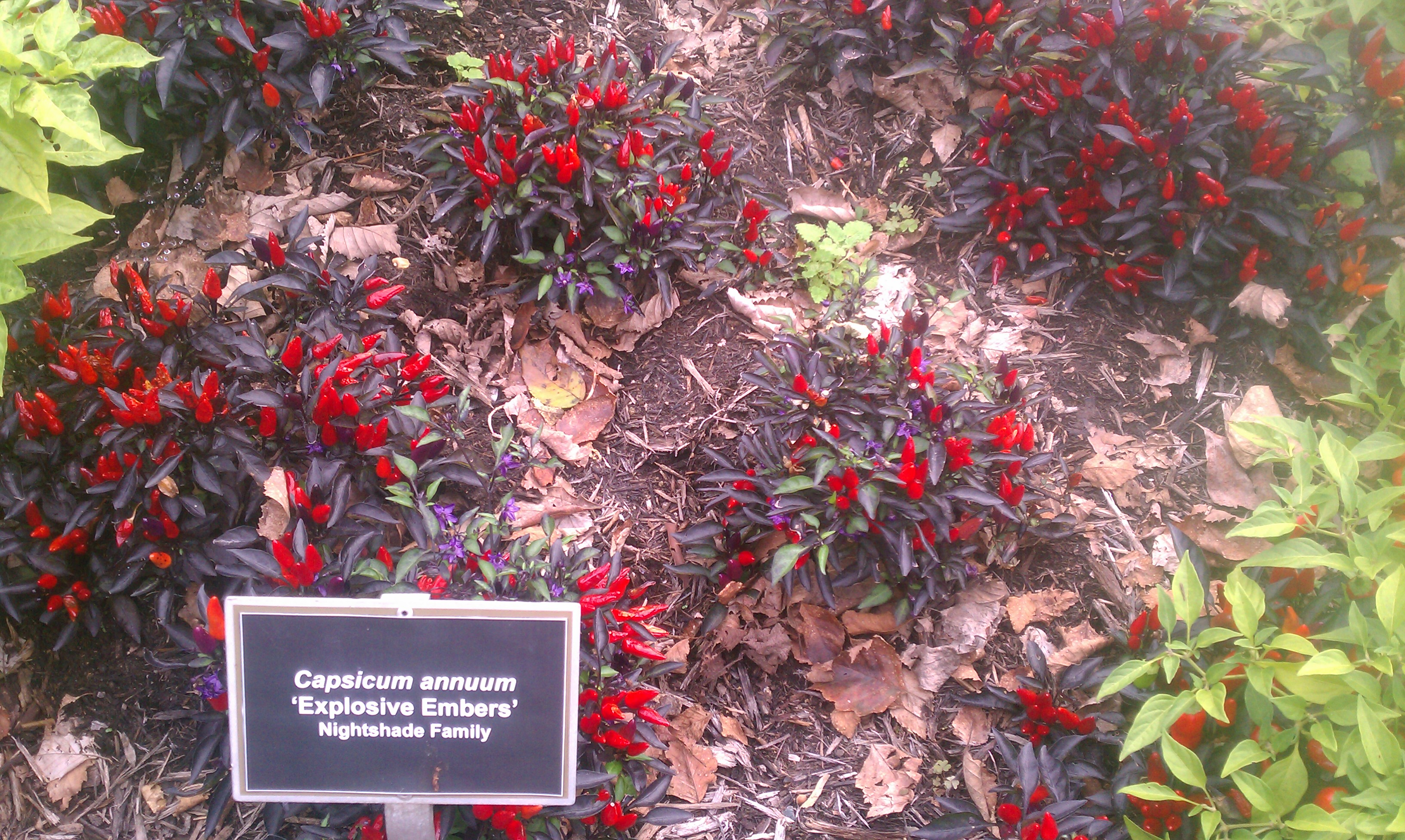
Capsicum annuum Explosive Embers

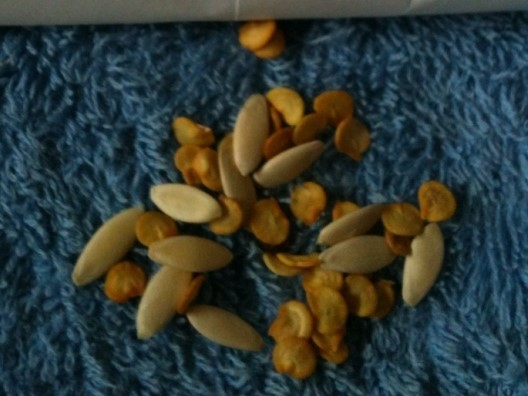
Chili pepper 'subicho' seeds for planting

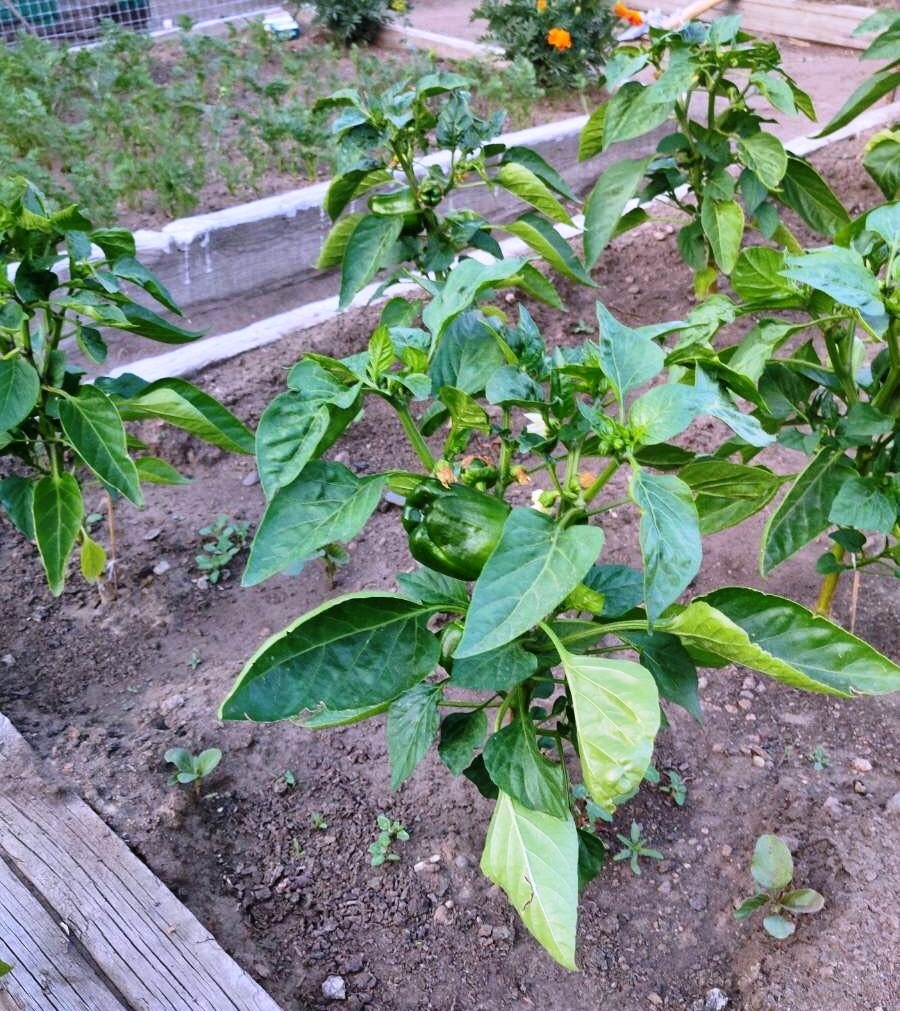
Bell pepper in Eastern Siberia

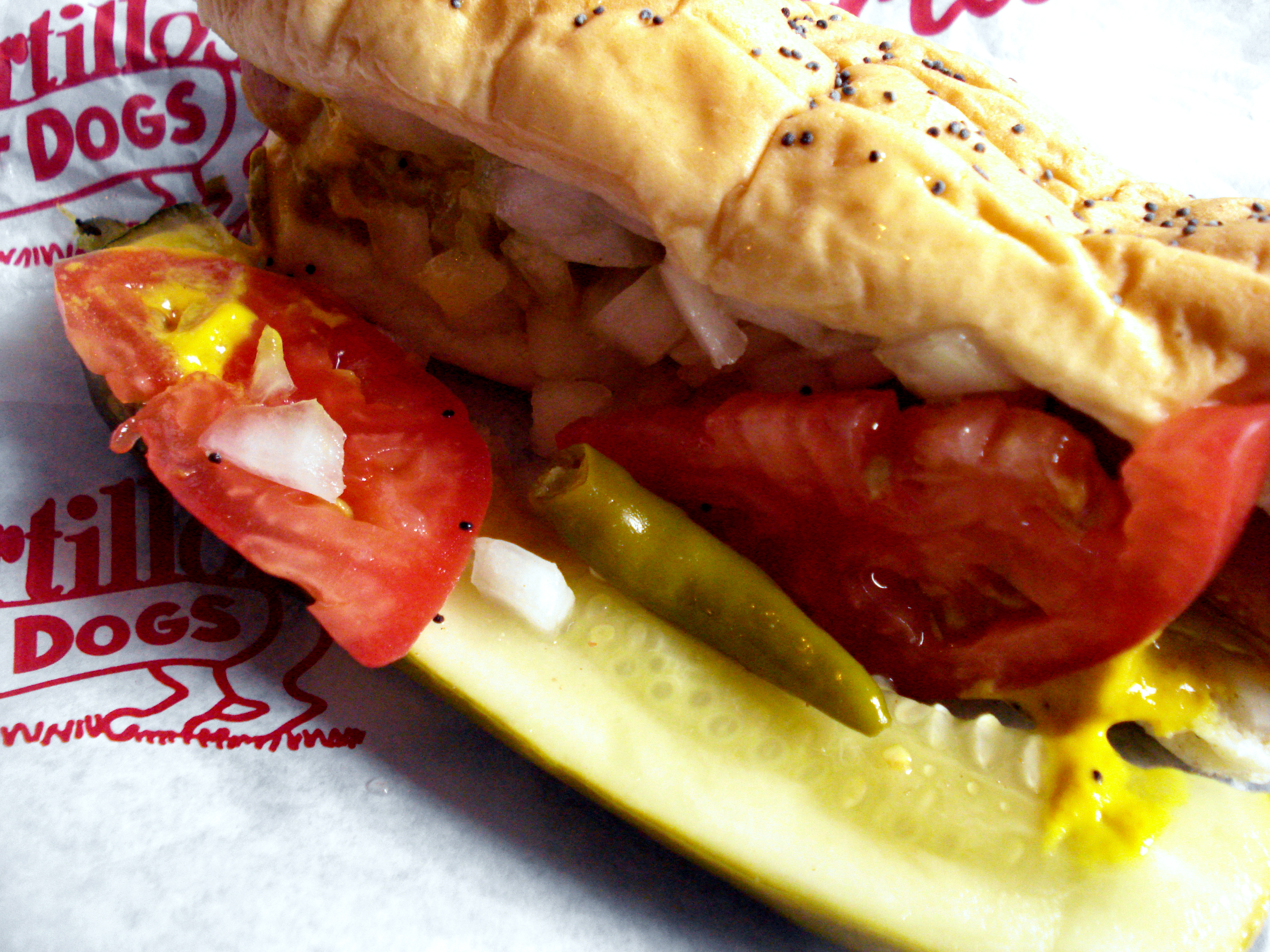
Chicago-style hot dog with sport peppers

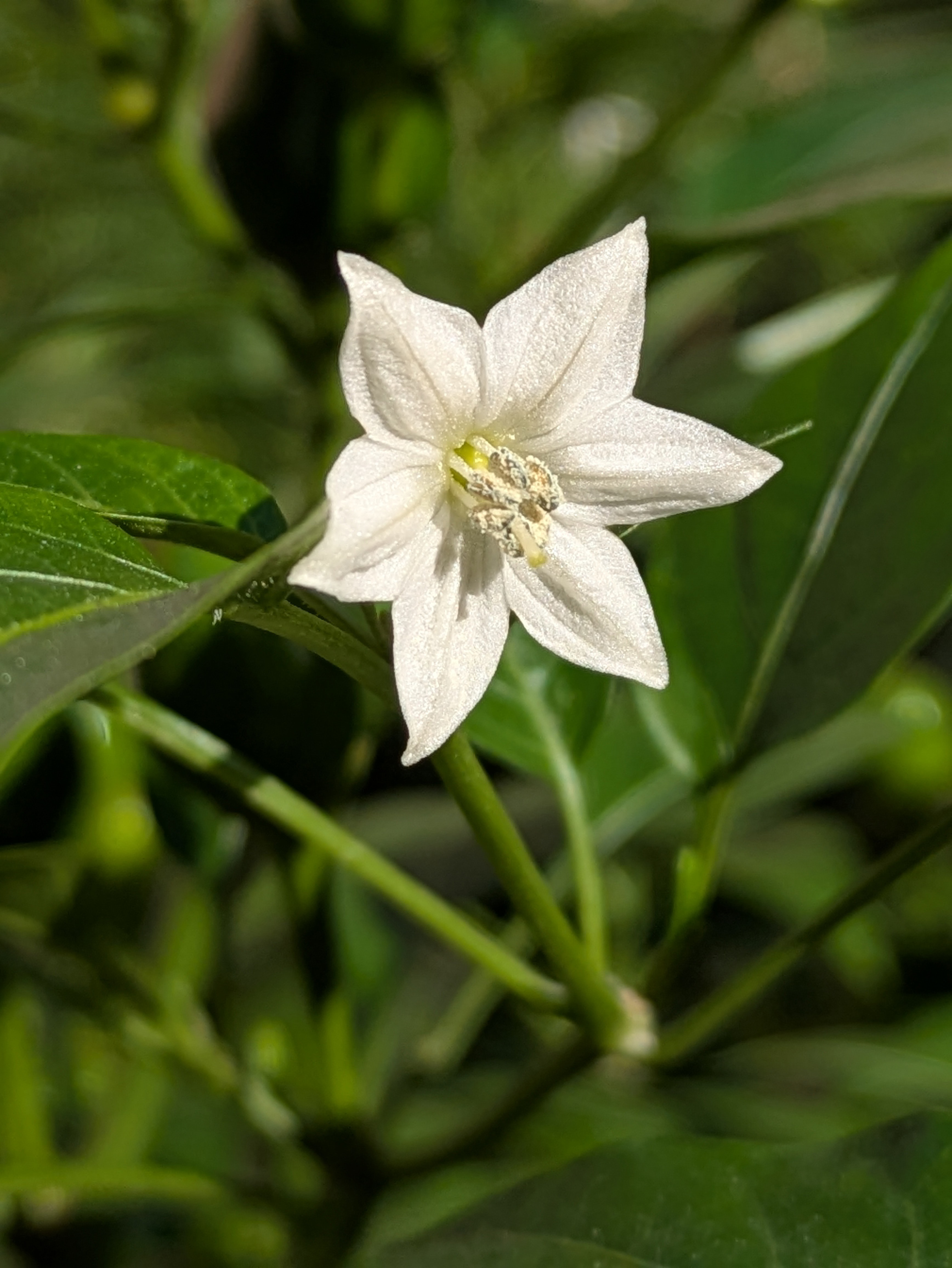
Capsicum annuum flower in Behbahan, Iran

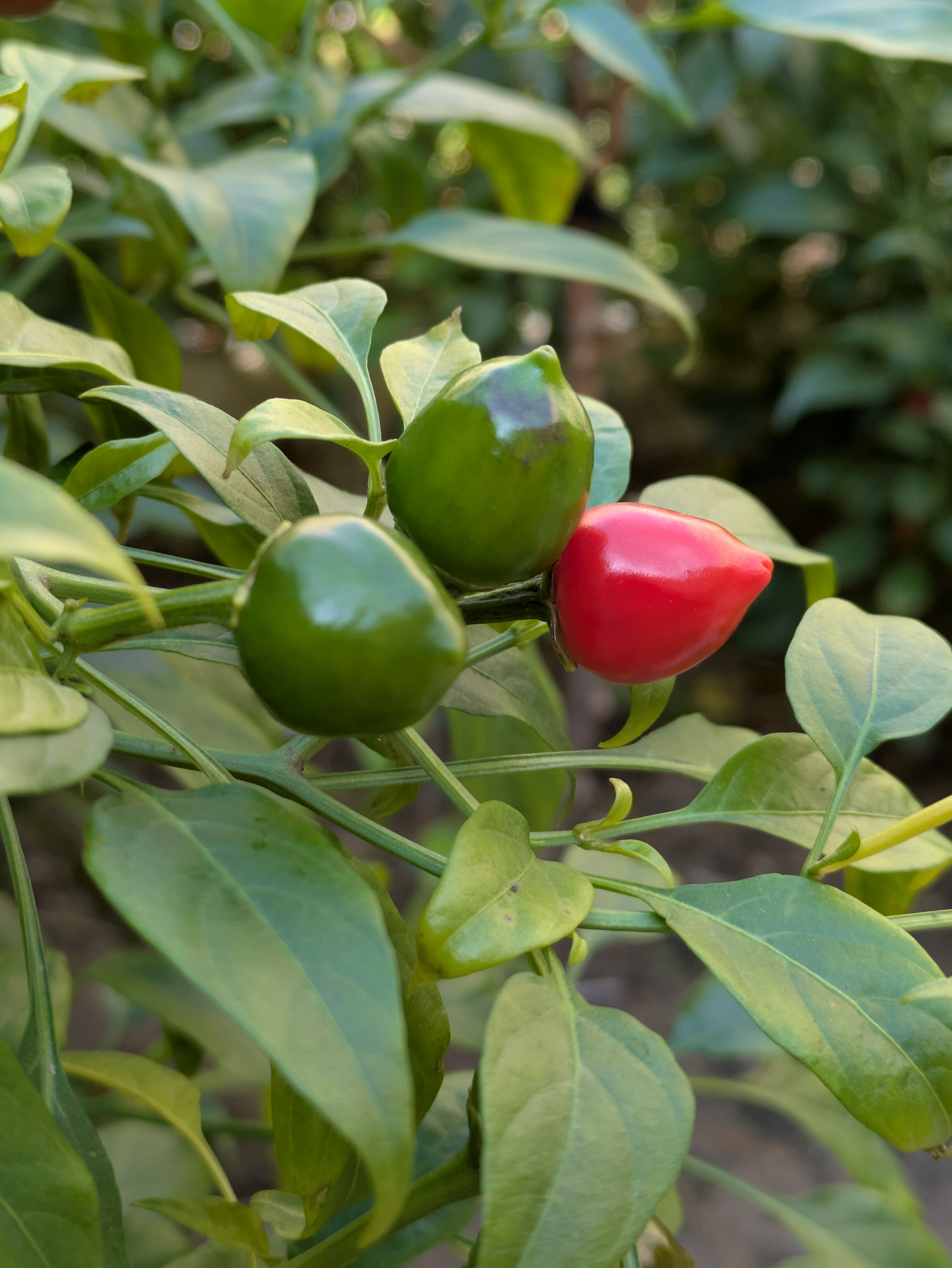
Capsicum annuum fruits in Behbahan

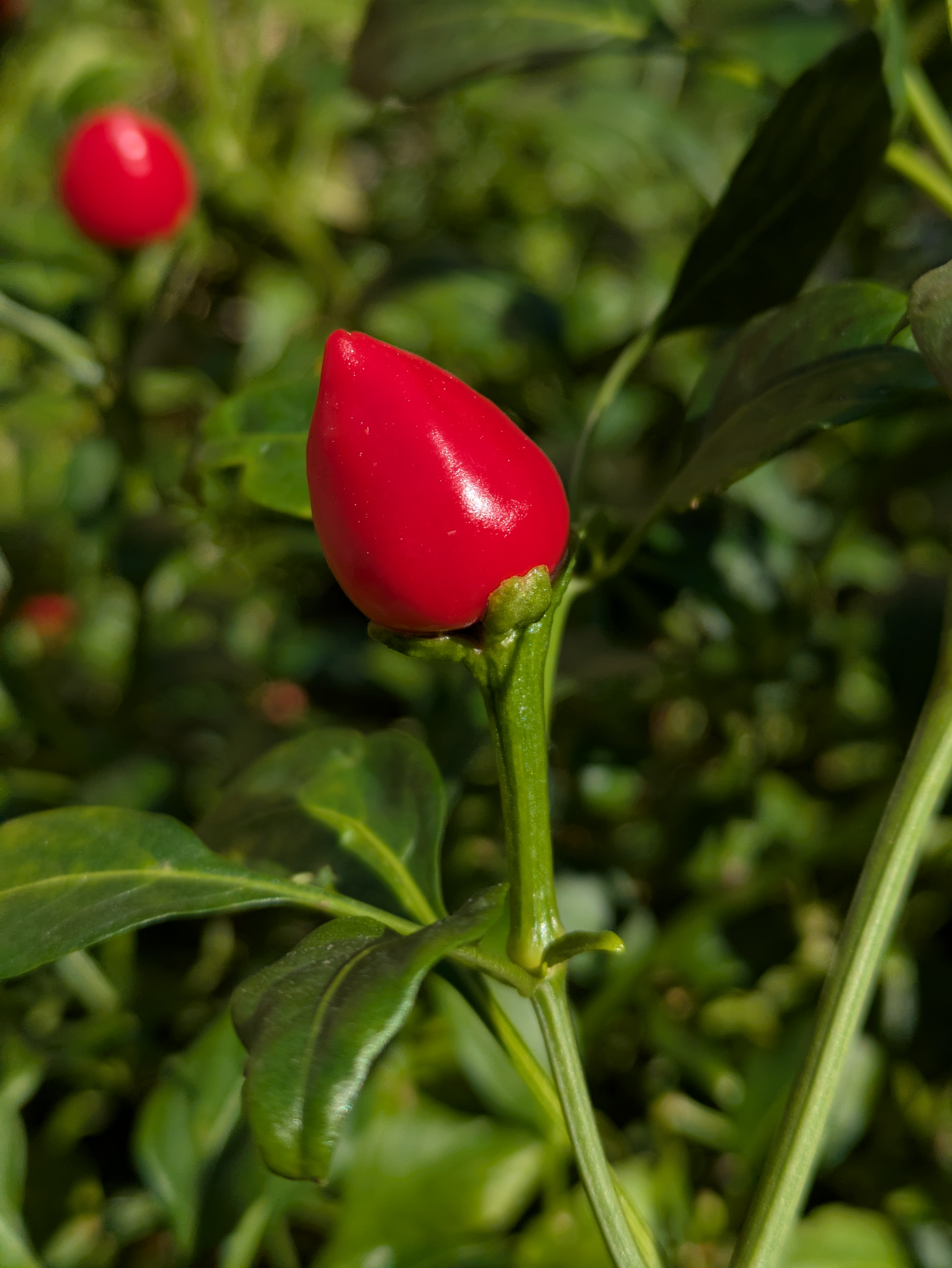
Capsicum annuum fruits

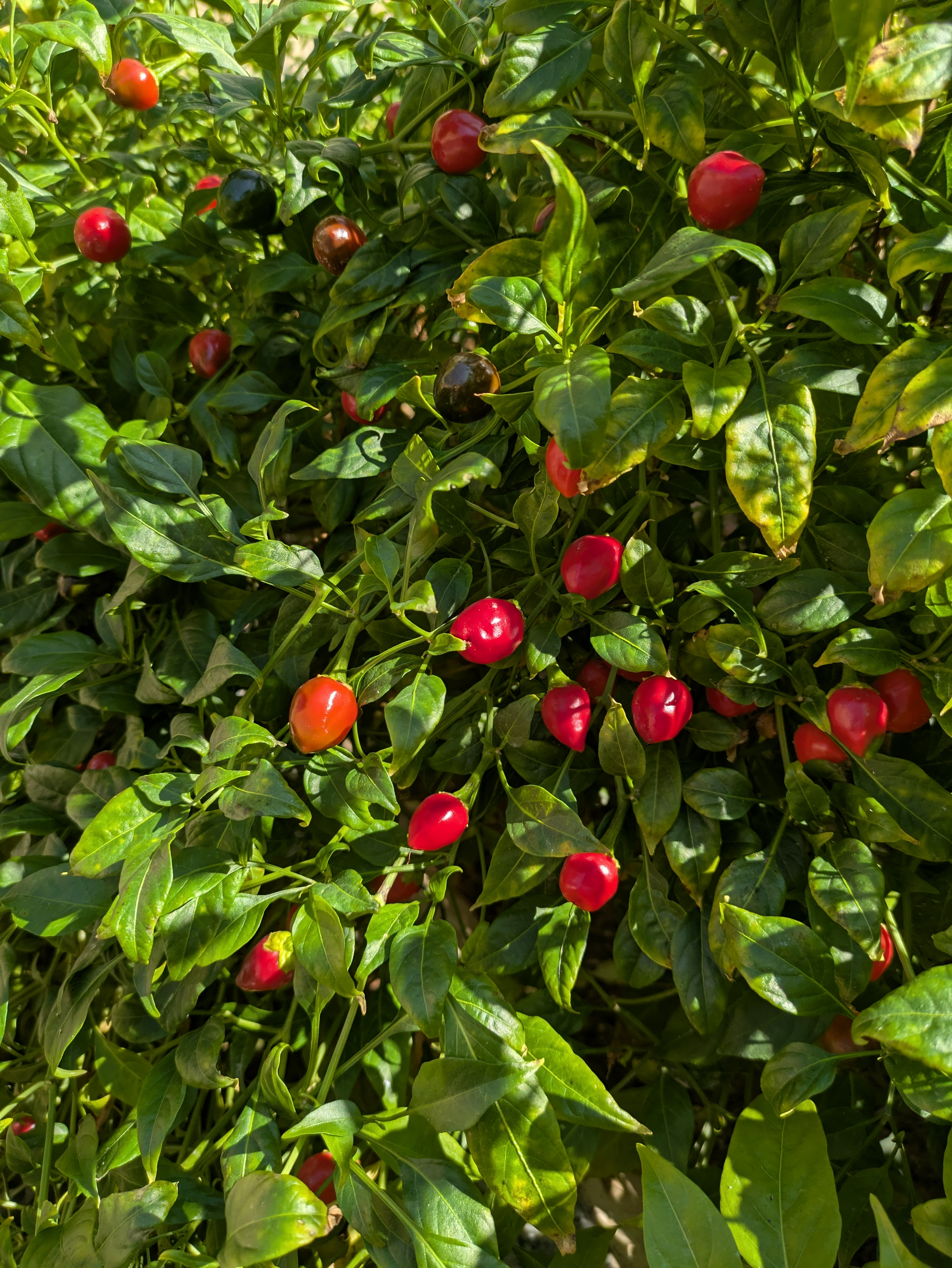
Capsicum annuum fruits in Behbahan, Iran

== See also ==
- List of Capsicum cultivars
- Paprika
- Chili pepper
