= One Chip Challenge =

Spicy snack food challenge

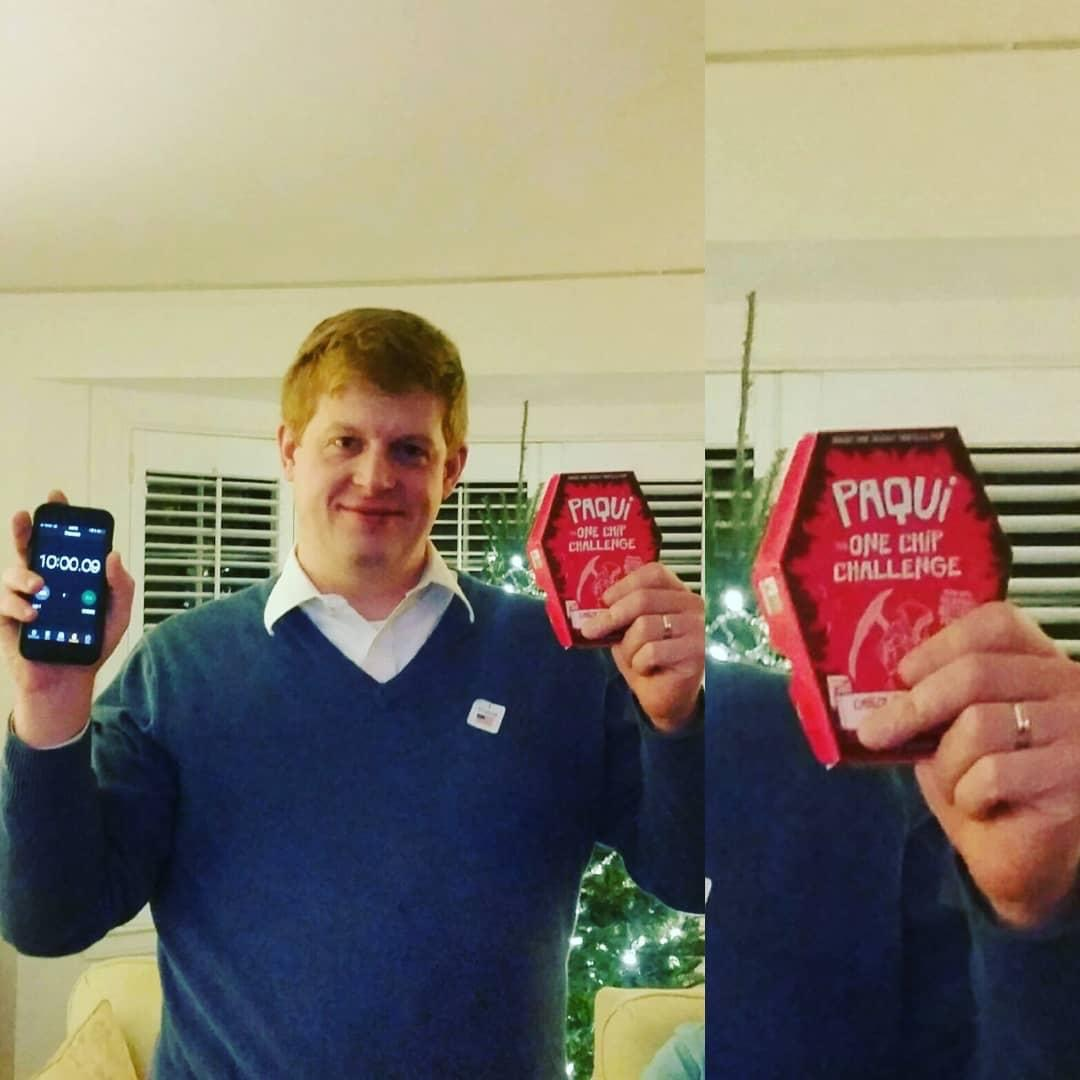
A person celebrating after completing the One Chip Challenge. A closer view of the chip's packaging is visible at right.

The One Chip Challenge was an internet challenge marketed by the tortilla chip brand Paqui, where participants had to eat an extremely spicy chip made with Carolina Reaper chili peppers. After consuming the chip, participants then had to avoid eating or drinking anything afterwards for a set amount of time. Initially marketed under owner Amplify Snack Brands, which was acquired by The Hershey Company in 2017, the chip was sold annually in limited quantities during the fall season from 2016 until 2023, when it was suspended after a customer death. Each year featured unique packaging and a new formulation with additional varieties of peppers, such as Trinidad Moruga scorpion, Sichuan, and Naga Viper peppers. The challenge was tried by celebrities and social media personalities, and received criticism for negative associated health effects.

In September 2023, Paqui's One Chip Challenge was discontinued when Harris Wolobah, a 14-year-old boy from Worcester, Massachusetts, died a few hours after he took the challenge. Paqui immediately withdrew and discontinued the chips from any further sales and indefinitely stopped publicity for the challenge. The teen's death later led to the chip being withdrawn from sale by Paqui and recalled from stores.

In May 2024, an autopsy confirmed that Wolobah died from cardiopulmonary arrest after eating a substance containing a high amount of capsaicin, and had cardiomegaly, a congenital heart defect. Paqui responded by stating that the warning label on their website and packaging clearly said that the challenge was not for children, or those with health risks. The death led to increased scrutiny on capsaicin products and their health risks.

== Background ==
Paqui was an American brand of tortilla chips, founded by Doug Lyon, a veteran of the advertising industry, and Alissa Bassana in Austin in 2008. SkinnyPop acquired Paqui in 2015, after which Lyon became the parent company's vice president of creative and innovation. After SkinnyPop later reincorporated as Amplify Snack Brands, The Hershey Company acquired Amplify, and thus Paqui, in 2017.

Amplify and Hershey both continued selling chips under the Paqui brand. Paqui's Carolina Reaper chips, sold individually wrapped, were known for being among the spiciest flavors sold.

== Challenge ==
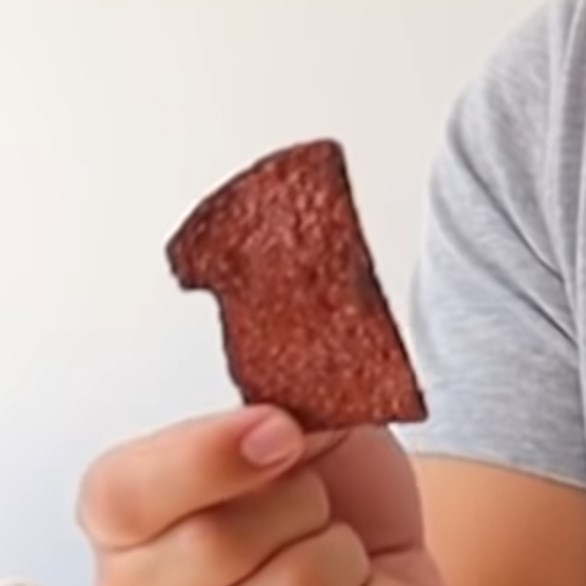
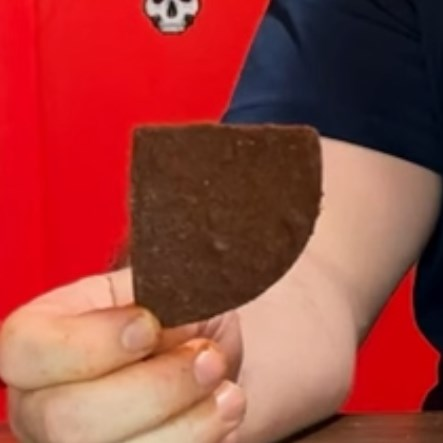
The tortilla chip's formulation was changed on an annual basis.

In 2016, the One Chip Challenge was first promoted by Amplify Snack Brands under the name Carolina Reaper Madness, which at the time was the world's hottest chili pepper. As the Reaper chips quickly sold out, Amplify started a "1-in-10 chance to win the Reaper" offer in October 2017. This offer included a chance to win a year's supply of Paqui chips and a custom "reaper" neon sign for those who posted a video or photo of themselves "enjoying" the Reaper chip to Instagram or Twitter.

After the contest ended on January 31, 2018 a "Wall of Infamy" was posted on Amplify's "Paqui" website, of those who were able to complete the contest. Paqui, now owned by Hershey, repeated this contest towards the end of 2019, which ended in February 2020, with the grand prize including a "Tailgate Party" instead of a neon sign.

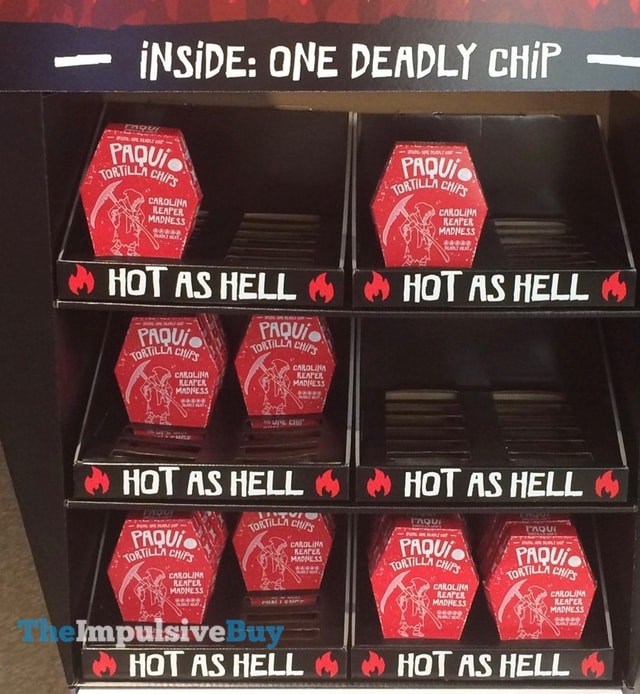
Tortilla chips individually packaged in coffin-shaped boxes

In September 2020, the main focus became the challenge of eating a single chip, marketed inside of a coffin-shaped box. To increase the heat, the Scorpion Pepper and Sichuan pepper were added with the Reaper. In order to qualify for the "Wall of Infamy" participants were required to eat one chip, with video/photo proof, and avoid eating or drinking anything afterwards for up to an hour. A scale was used on Paqui's website that ranged from 5 minutes (Featherweight) to 1 hour (Heavyweight). For the first time, a warning was added to Paqui's "One Chip Challenge" website, which said that children, and people who are sensitive, allergic, and pregnant should not eat the chip.

In September 2021, the challenge returned, and again in September 2022 with mention of the Sichuan pepper dropped from packaging. On Paqui's website, the challenge scale of 5 minutes to 1 hour was changed to read "Powerless" to "Invincible", and included wording such as "How long can you last before getting Owned?", and "How long can you last before you short circuit?".

In 2022, the chips sold for the One Chip Challenge were made with food coloring that turned people's tongues bright blue, to deter cheating. Before the challenge was discontinued in 2023, the challenge was updated to include the Naga Viper pepper with the Carolina Reaper. Now going with a snake theme, the challenge scale of 5 minutes to 1 hour was adjusted to include "Harmless" to "Apex Predator".

As word of the challenge spread it was attempted by various people in the American media. Celebrities including Alexandria Ocasio-Cortez, Shaquille O'Neal, Joel Embiid, Lil Yachty, and Sean Evans all tried the challenge. In 2023, rapper T.I.'s son King Harris controversially offered to pay a homeless man $50 if he completed a One Chip Challenge. Since the man failed the challenge, Harris only paid him $20. An anchor for KWGN-TV in Denver, Colorado, vomited on live television after trying to eat the chip.

== Health concerns ==
=== School incidents ===
Over time, the challenge became more controversial, as some participants required medical attention. While Paqui warned that the One Chip Challenge should have been attempted by adults only, children and teens still accepted the stunt. In September 2022, the challenge was banned by Huerfano School District RE-1 in Huerfano County, Colorado, as many children of their schools were accepting the challenge and being hospitalized.

Other schools later followed suit, including Lodi High School in Lodi, California, and schools in Pearland Independent School District in Pearland, Texas. In November 2022, first responders were called to Dunwoody High School in Dunwoody, Georgia to treat a student who tried to participate in the challenge.

=== Death of Harris Wolobah ===
In September 2023, a 14-year-old boy from Worcester, Massachusetts named Harris Wolobah ate a Paqui chip, complained about a severe stomach ache, and died within a few hours. Shortly afterwards, Paqui removed promotional text reading, "How long can you last before you spiral out?" from its web page about the One Chip Challenge. The company deleted web pages that let customers buy Carolina Reaper chips online and locate stores that sold them. The company asked retailers to withdraw the challenge chips from sale and offered refunds to customers who had purchased them.

A spokeswoman for Paqui said, "We care about all of our consumers and have made the decision to remove the product from shelves. Paqui presently has several representatives visiting retailers to retrieve the recalled product, in effort to prevent further injury through "under the tables" sales." The autopsy report obtained in May 2024, listed the cause of death as cardiopulmonary arrest "in the setting of recent ingestion of food substance with high capsaicin concentration." Harris also had an enlarged heart and a congenital heart defect, according to the report shared by Timothy McGuirk, spokesperson for the Massachusetts Executive Office of Public Safety and Security.

The family of Harris Wolobah subsequently filed a wrongful death lawsuit against Walgreens for selling the chip, and Hershey with its affiliate food manufacturers Paqui and Amplify Snack Brands. While a judge ruled in April 2026 that Walgreens could not be found liable, the case against Hershey was allowed to proceed.

Ed Currie, who originally bred the Carolina Reaper, said "there's a lot more attention" now on capsaicin in his industry. Currie called challenges like these "stupid" and stated that "we don't market our products to children at all." Currie went on to say that "I think, as an industry, we need to inform people of what they're getting into. To me, that's common sense." Dr. Stuart Berger, the head of cardiology at Lurie Children's Heart Center in Chicago, said that this case may "force us to pause and look more closely at capsaicin and its effects."

== See also ==
- Chili pepper
- Hot pepper challenge
- List of Internet challenges
- Scoville scale
