= Robert Steinberg (chocolate maker) =

American chocolatier (1947–2008)

Robert Wayne Steinberg (March 4, 1947 – September 17, 2008) was an American physician who co-founded Scharffen Berger Chocolate Maker in 1996 with John Scharffenberger, his friend and former patient.

== Early life ==
Robert Steinberg was born on March 4, 1947, in Boston, to parents Arthur and Selma Levinson Steinberg. His mother was an elementary school teacher while his father was a clinical psychologist. Steinberg's father died of Hodgkin's disease when he was a child.

Steinberg received his bachelor's degree in 1969 from Harvard University. He later earned his medical degree from the University of Connecticut in 1974. He first moved to San Francisco as part of a medical internship. He remained in the area and ran his own family practice for approximately twenty years in San Francisco and Ukiah, California.

== Scharffen Berger Chocolate Maker ==
Steinberg was diagnosed in 1989 with lymphoma, a disease which he would battle for nearly twenty years. At the time, Steinberg was given a 50% chance of succumbing to the disease within ten years of his diagnosis. He realized that his full-time profession as a physician would be difficult with the necessary medical treatment. As a result of his diagnosis, Steinberg began exploring his own interests and alternative career paths.

A friend of Steinberg's introduced him to chocolate making and gave him a 600-page book on the "science of chocolate making". Steinberg, who was a self-proclaimed foodie, had been interested in food and cooking since he was a child. The concept of making chocolate caught Steinberg's attention. Following his diagnosis, Steinberg travelled to Lyon, France, in 1993, where he became an apprentice at a small family-owned chocolate maker called Bernachon for a few weeks. His new interest in chocolate would later take him to a number of cacao growing nations including Trinidad and Tobago and Venezuela.

Steinberg returned from Lyons to California following the end of his Bernachon internship. He soon ran into his neighbor and former patient, John Scharffenberger. Scharffenberger was in the process of selling his winery, called Scharffenberger Cellars, at the time. Steinberg gave Scharffenberger a sample of the Bernachon French chocolates. The chocolate had been in Steinberg's pocket for a long time, but Scharffenberger declared it, "tasted better than anything I'd ever had." The two soon began talking about joining forces as partners.

Steinberg and Scharffenberger set up a test kitchen in Steinberg's home kitchen to experiment with approximately thirty different varieties of chocolate and their potential recipes. The tools they used in Steinberg's kitchen to develop the future Scharffen Berger brand chocolate included a mortar and pestle, a coffee grinder and a hair dryer, which they used to keep the chocolate's viscosity.

In 1996, Steinberg and Scharffenberger opened a small chocolate factory and factory store in southern San Francisco, where they produced their first chocolate products for sale in the marketplace. They employed several antique German chocolate machines to make their products in small batches The new small business was called Scharffen Berger Chocolate Maker, which took advantage of John Scharffenberger's name recognition in the San Francisco Bay Area.

Scharffen Berger Chocolate hit the San Francisco Bay Area markets at a time when Americans were becoming interested in consuming higher quality, speciality foods such as wine, coffee and chocolate. Scharffen Berger chocolate bars, which were known for a bittersweet chocolate with intense fruity notes, quickly gained a following as their products became available in supermarkets and specialty stores in the Bay Area.

Consumer demand led Scharffen Berger Chocolate Maker to relocate to a larger factory in 2001, complete with a cafe and gift shop, in Berkeley, California. The company also expanded its product portfolio from chocolate bars to include ganache, caramel, mints, hot cocoa and chocolate-dipped fruit.

Scharffen Berger was acquired by The Hershey Company in 2005. Hershey's began marketing and distributing Scharffen Berger Chocolate as its high end product line.

== Death ==
Robert Steinberg died on September 17, 2008, of lymphatic cancer at the age of 61. He was survived by his mother, Selma Levinson Steinberg, sister, Nancy Steinberg, and stepsister, Judith Margolin.
