= Joseph Schmidt Confections =

American chocolatier

Joseph Schmidt Confections was a San Francisco-based chocolatier, which created gourmet confections with imported Belgian chocolate. The line of confections included truffles of various sizes, slicks, and mosaics. Joseph Schmidt confections ceased operations in 2009.

== History ==
=== Early ===
Joseph Schmidt Confections was started in San Francisco during 1983. Joseph Schmidt, a European-trained baker, opened the store with his partner Audrey Ryan, a European-trained confectioner, and together, they sold baked goods and chocolates. Joseph Schmidt's signature egg-shaped truffle was the company's trademark.

In 1985, Joseph and Audrey brought in two partners to grow the business: Jeff Smith, a successful restaurateur and veteran of Nestle, and Duane Papierniak, an engineer. They continued to run the company until 2005, growing the business both nationally and internationally. At different times, Joseph Schmidt products were available in such department stores as Harrods and Selfridges in the London, David Jones in Australia, Takashimaya in Tokyo, and a variety of locations in Canada. Their retail availability in North America included department stores such as Neiman Marcus, Macy's, Bloomingdales, and Saks Fifth Avenue, and gourmet grocery stores such as Whole Foods, Trader Joe's and the Fresh Market, as well as other independent stores.

The company had stores in the Castro neighborhood of San Francisco, and in San Jose.

=== Current ===
In November 2005, Joseph Schmidt Confections was purchased by Artisan Confections Company, a Hershey subsidiary, which had previously purchased Scharffen Berger Chocolate Maker, an artisanal chocolate manufacturer in nearby Berkeley, California. In November 2006 Artisan Confections purchased Dagoba, an Ashland, Oregon-based manufacturer of organic chocolate. Hershey's later began to consolidate the production of Scharffen Berger products in an upgraded factory in Robinson, Illinois. In early 2009 Hershey's announced plans to eliminate the Joseph Schmidt brand. By July 2009 both the production facility and retail store on 16th Street in San Francisco closed, laying off approximately 150 local employees.
