= Scharffen Berger Chocolate Maker =

American chocolate manufacturer

Scharffen Berger

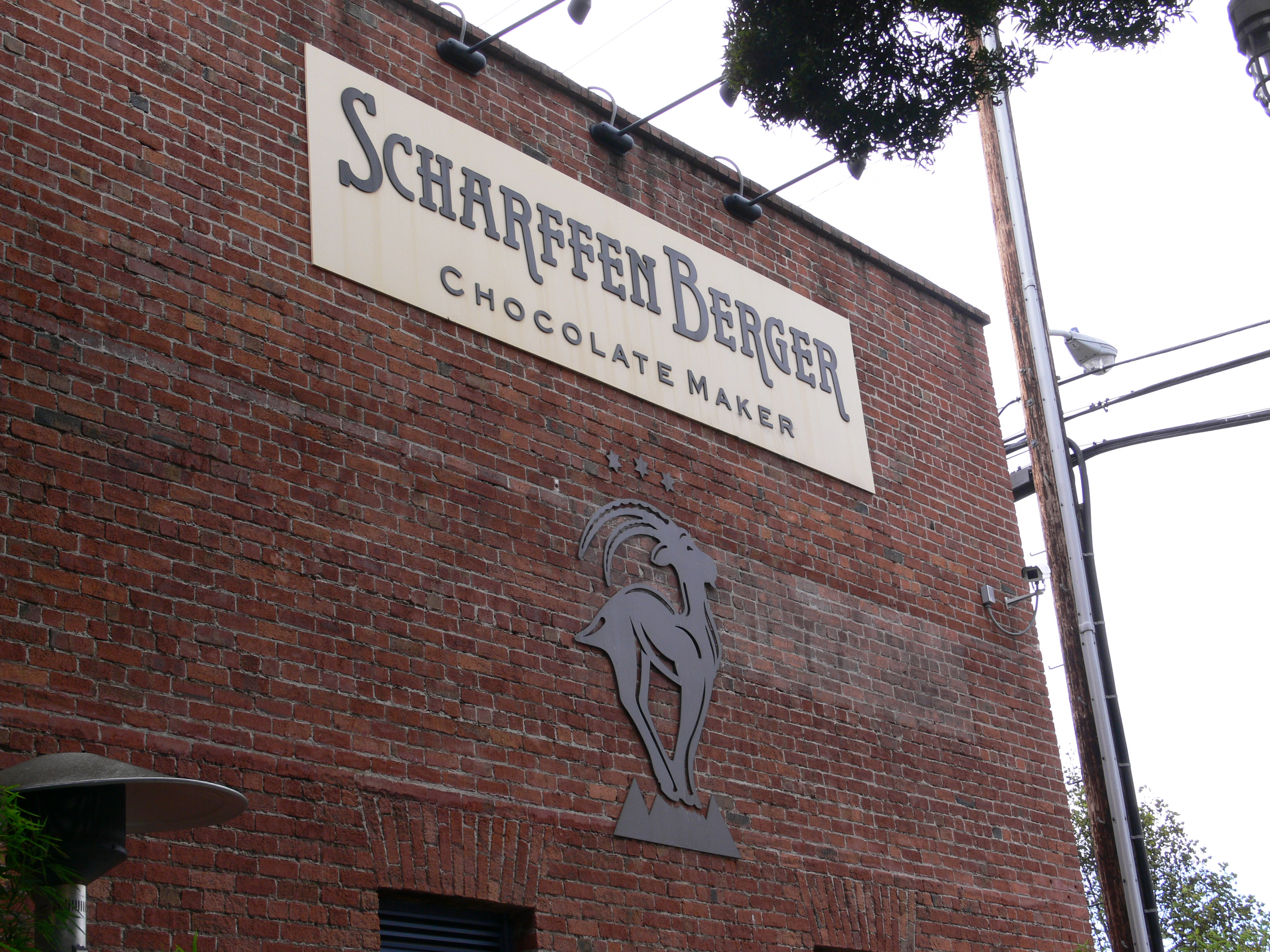
- Scharffen Berger factory in 2008
- Type: Private (1996–2005, 2021–); Subsidiary (2005–21)
- Industry: Food
- Founded: 1996; 30 years ago
- Founder: John Scharffenberger; Robert Steinberg
- Fate: Acquired by Harry & David in 2024,
- Headquarters: Ashland, Oregon, United States
- Products: Chocolate
- Parent: 1-800-Flowers.com, Inc.
- Website: scharffenberger.com

Scharffen Berger is an American chocolate manufacturing company, which was a subsidiary of The Hershey Company after it had been acquired in 2005. Scharffen Berger was established as an independent Berkeley, California-based chocolate maker in 1996 by sparkling wine maker John Scharffenberger and physician Robert Steinberg.

The company manufactures its own chocolate—as opposed to the more common practice of acquiring chocolate from other manufacturers—the first American company founded in the past 50 years to make chocolate "from bean to bar." Scharffen Berger primarily produced chocolate bars, using small-batch processing and focusing on dark chocolate varieties with high cocoa solid content.

== History ==
The company's origins lie with founders John Scharffenberger and Robert Steinberg. In 1989, Steinberg, a physician, was diagnosed with cancer and given a 50% chance of dying within ten years of the diagnosis. Steinberg promptly sold his practice and began exploring other career options. He read through a 600-page chocolate cookbook at the urging of a friend, which sparked Steinberg's interest in chocolate making. He began travelling to study the process of chocolate making. Steinberg toured the Bernachon chocolate company in Lyon, France, in 1993. He soon composed a letter in French asking Bernachon for an internship and was granted a brief two weeks with the small company.

Steinberg returned from his internship in France and soon ran into John Scharffenberger, his former patient and neighbor. Scharffenberger, a winemaker and businessman, was selling his winery, Scharffenberger Cellars, and was exploring potential new business opportunities. Steinberg offered Scharffenberger a piece of French chocolate which he happened to have in his pocket. "Robert had this chunk of chocolate in his pocket that I think he'd been carrying for months. But it tasted better than anything I'd ever had," Scharffenberger later recalled in a 1998 interview with People Magazine.

Scharffenberger and Steinberg soon partnered together to begin making chocolate. They began creating their first experimental batches of chocolate in Steinberg's own home kitchen using over 30 varieties of cacao beans. Their basic chocolate making instruments included a mortar and pestle, coffee grinder and a hair dryer to keep the chocolate viscous.

They decided to name their new company Scharffen Berger Chocolate Maker because Scharffenberger's name was already a known brand in the marketplace due to his winemaking.

By 1997 they made the first batch in a small South San Francisco factory using vintage German equipment and basic ingredients including Venezuelan Criollo beans and whole Tahitian vanilla. The company relocated to a new facility at a historic factory complex in Berkeley, California, within four years.

The company selected its cacao beans from specific growers around the world and then performed every step to transform those beans into chocolate bars itself: from roasting, to conching, to tempering and molding. Scharffen Berger was the first American chocolate maker to prominently feature a chocolate bar's cacao content on the label, the higher the number the darker and more bitter the chocolate bar. Cacao content on labels is now common in the industry.

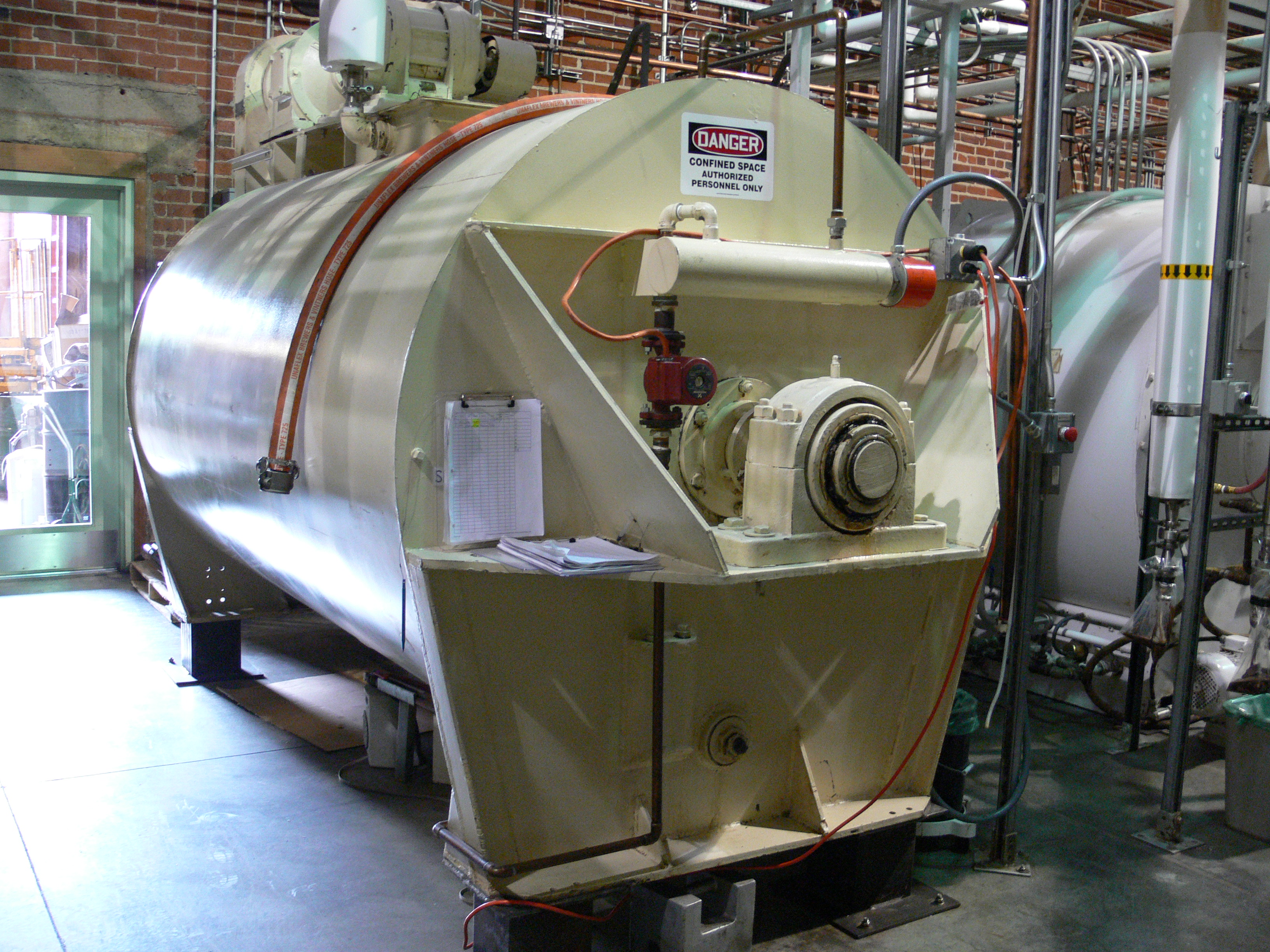
Interior of the Scharffen Berger factory, 2008

On 25 July 2005, Scharffen Berger announced that it was being bought by The Hershey Company On 2005 August 15, Hershey announced the completion of the acquisition. Hershey purchased Scharffen Berger for about two times the company's annual revenue, which was approximately $10 million a year at the time of the 2005 acquisition. The same year Hershey also bought another San Francisco company, Joseph Schmidt Confections, and combined the two smaller companies into a wholly owned subsidiary, Artisan Confections Company.

Hershey subsequently began manufacturing the Scharffen Berger and Joseph Schmidt products in a factory in Robinson, Illinois. In early 2009 Hershey announced plans to close both Bay Area factories, lay off approximately 150 local employees, and transfer remaining production to Illinois.

Scharffen Berger founder Robert Steinberg died on 17 September 2008, in San Francisco, California.

After more than 15 years of joint operations, in 2020 The Hershey Company divested some of its business, including the Scharffen Berger and Dagoba chocolate brands and Krave Pure Foods in order to focus on the salty snacks and nutrition bars markets. In June 2021, Scharffen Berger again became a privately held company.

The company was purchased by Harry & David in 2024.

== Child labor and fair trade ==
Hershey has been criticized for not having programs to ensure sustainable and ethical cocoa purchase, lagging behind its competitors in addressing child labor in its cocoa supply and other fair trade issues. "The Raise the Bar, Hershey! Campaign" was launched in September 2010 by Global Exchange, Green America, the Oasis Trust, and the International Labor Rights Forum. The purpose of the Raise the Bar Campaign is to pressure Hershey to commit "to take immediate action to eliminate forced and child labor … from Hershey's cocoa supply"; "to sourcing 100% Fair Trade Certified cocoa beans by 2012 for at least one of its top five selling chocolate bars … making at least one additional top five selling bar 100% Fair Trade Certified every two years thereafter"; and that "the majority of Hershey's cocoa across all products will be Fair Trade Certified by 2022." Pressure was particularly directed at Whole Foods Market to cease carrying Hershey's high-end products, which included Scharffen Berger and Dagoba. Whole Foods announced on 3 October 2012 that it would cease carrying Hershey's Scharffen Berger line. The Campaign stated that "Whole Foods' decision follows more than 40 natural food retailers and coops publicly expressing concern about carrying Scharffen Berger and Dagoba products as a consequence of the giant chocolate maker's refusal to address child labor in its supply chain." The same day, Hershey's announced that "it will source 100 percent certified cocoa for its global chocolate product lines by 2020 and accelerate its programs to help eliminate child labor in the cocoa regions of West Africa."

== Reviews ==
Chef Julia Child reportedly said that Scharffen Berger was the best chocolate she had tasted in the United States.

== See also ==
- List of bean-to-bar chocolate manufacturers
