= The Emperors of Chocolate =

Book by Joël Glenn Brenner

The Emperors of Chocolate: Inside the Secret World of Hershey and Mars
- Paperback edition
- Author: Joël Glenn Brenner
- Language: English
- Subject: Business history
- Genre: Non-fiction
- Publisher: Random House, Inc. (New York)
- Publication date: December 22, 1998
- Publication place: United States
- Media type: Hardcover, Paperback
- Pages: 366 pp.
- ISBN: 0-679-42190-4

The Emperors of Chocolate: Inside the Secret World of Hershey and Mars is a book by Joël Glenn Brenner published on December 22, 1998, by Random House, Inc. The book chronicles the stories of the history of Mars, Incorporated and The Hershey Company.

In a review for the St. Louis Post-Dispatch, Joseph Losos criticized the book's "naive" analysis of comparing periods, and said the book would be a disappointment to readers looking for a "serious, deeply analytical history" of chocolate companies during the 20th century. However, he praised the book as a journalistic comparison between Milton S. Hershey and Forrest Mars Sr., describing it overall as a "highly researched, fast-moving" text.
