= SkinnyPop =

American snack brand owned by the Hershey Salty Snacks Company

- Product type: Popcorn
- Current owner: The Hershey Salty Snacks Company
- Produced by: The Hershey Salty Snacks Company
- Country: United States
- Introduced: 2010; 16 years ago
- Related brands: Hershey’s Popped Snack Mix
- Markets: United States
- Previous owners: Amplify Snack Brands
- Tagline: Simple Tastes Better
- Website: skinnypop.com

SkinnyPop is an American brand of popcorn, mainly flavored with dairy-free ingredients, currently owned by Hershey Co. (through its subsidiary the Hershey Salty Snacks Company) after Hershey acquired its former owner, Amplify Snack Brands Inc. in 2017.

== History ==
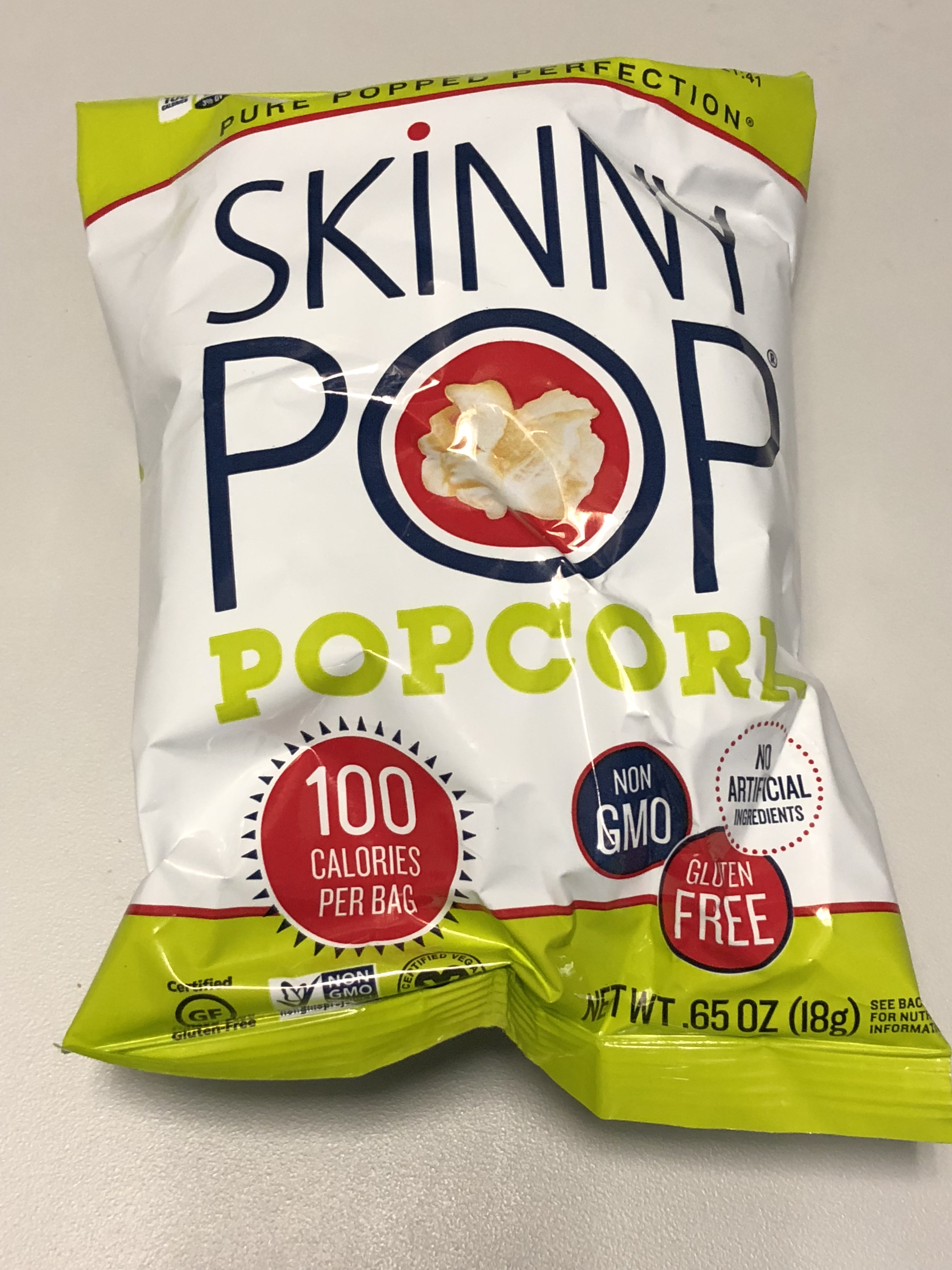
Pack of SkinnyPop popcorn

SkinnyPop was founded in 2010 in Skokie, Illinois by Andy Friedman and Pam Netzky, with investments from Jeffrey and Michael Eiserman. Friedman and Netzky had previously founded Wells Street Popcorn in 2007, which sold popcorn in grocery stores and theaters near Chicago. In 2010, Friedman and Netzky founded SkinnyPop Popcorn, which used a different recipe than Wells Street Popcorn. Their first pre-popped popcorn was launched in 2010 and was made with sunflower oil and salt. Different flavors were later introduced. The company released a microwave popcorn product in 2017, and later began selling popcorn puffs and rice cakes.

The first thousand bags of SkinnyPop were hand-produced by the company's founders and sold locally in Chicago stores. In October 2010, SkinnyPop signed with a distributor. Due to time constraints from managing two brands, Friedman and Netzky franchised Wells Street Popcorn to Netzky's cousin at the end of 2010.

By 2012, SkinnyPop was being manufactured in Chicago and distributed to 4,500 retail stores. In 2013, SkinnyPop partnered with Jason Cohen and recorded $44 million in sales. By August 2014, SkinnyPop was being sold in 25,000 retail stores internationally. That same year, Friedman and Netzky sold their majority stake in the company to TA Associates for $320 million. TA Associates hired Tom Ennis, former president of Oberto Brands, as the company's CEO and reincorporated SkinnyPop as Amplify Snack Brands.

=== Initial public offering and sale to Hershey ===
Amplify Snack Brands went public in 2015 with an initial public offering of $18 per share. That year, the company's sales were $176.9 million. Amplify shares hit a low in January 2016. They recovered later that year, but did not reach the initial IPO. In 2016, sales grew to $326.9 million. In December 2017, Hershey Co. purchased Amplify Snack Brands for $1.6 billion at $12 a share.
