= Hot pepper challenge =

Internet challenge

The hot pepper challenge (also ghost pepper challenge or chili pepper challenge) is an Internet viral video fad, consisting of a food challenge that involves filming oneself while eating and swallowing a chili pepper that is high on the Scoville scale and known for its piquant (spicy-hot) qualities, in particular the cayenne pepper, Thai pepper, habanero, ghost pepper, and the Trinidad moruga scorpion pepper; the video is then uploaded to the Internet. Hot pepper challenges have been featured on television series, including Man v. Food.

The Internet videos generally show the different stages the participant goes through. In the introduction, the challenger introduces themselves and states the proposed challenge, shows the pepper, and discusses its qualities. The challenger often takes precautionary measures like setting out a large quantity of milk to drink after consuming the pepper, which helps relieve and cope with the burning sensation in the mouth and throat. Then the pepper (or food item containing it) is eaten. After a short while, an extreme burning sensation and profuse sweating are experienced by the challenger, caused by the pepper's capsaicin and related capsaicinoids. Sometimes vomiting and hallucinations (e.g., reduced vision) are induced by eating the pepper.

The challenge has resulted in a small number of reported cases of problems or health scares. In one such instance, in September 2016, five 11- to 14-year-old school students from West Milton, Ohio, were hospitalized after 40 of them ate ghost peppers as part of a challenge and suffered apparently allergic reactions. There is also an account of a 47-year-old California man who was sent to an emergency department after consuming a hamburger topped with ghost pepper puree in an eating contest; doctors found that he had ruptured his esophagus (Boerhaave syndrome) from excessive vomiting, and that his left lung had collapsed from the pressure of stomach fluid and food material entering his abdominal cavity through the tear in his throat.

Even the hottest peppers are not literally toxic in reasonable quantities; research has suggested that it would take around 3 pounds (1.36 kg) of the highest-Scoville peppers, like ghost pepper, to kill a 150-pound (68 kg) adult. However, there are documented fatalities from cardiac arrest caused by the pain and panic induced by pepper spray, the main ingredient of which is oleoresin capsicum, a concentrated capsaicin wax extracted from chili peppers. Allergic reactions to the substance itself, especially asthma attacks, are more common. These were also reported in the Ohio school's ghost pepper incident.

== See also ==
- Food challenge
- Ice bucket challenge
- List of Internet challenges § Food and drink
