= Dagoba Organic Chocolate =

American chocolate brand

Dagoba
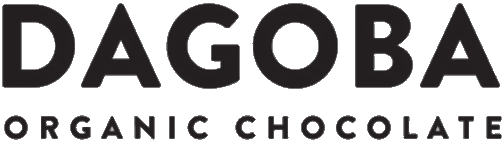
- Company type: Private (2001–2006, 2021–); Subsidiary (2006–2021)
- Industry: Food
- Founded: 2001; 25 years ago
- Founder: Frederick Schilling
- Fate: Acquired by Hershey in 2006, returned to private ownership in 2021
- Headquarters: Ashland, Oregon, United States
- Products: Organic chocolate
- Parent: Hershey (2006–21)
- Website: dagobachocolate.com

Dagoba Organic Chocolate was a brand of chocolate founded in 2001 by Frederick Schilling. The Hershey Company acquired Dagoba in 2006 but in June 2021 Dagoba again became a privately held company. Hershey divested the Dagoba chocolate brand along with Krave Pure Foods and Scharffen Berger in order to focus on the salty snacks and nutrition bars markets. After the divestiture, Scharffen Berger moved production and its headquarters to the Dagoba factory in Ashland, Oregon and registered in 2021 as an LLC with the Oregon Secretary of State. However, Dagoba did not re-register in Oregon as a business entity and the Dagoba home page redirects to the Hershey site (though Dagoba is no longer a brand on the Hershey site).

The name Dagoba is Sinhalese from dhatu-garbha, Sanskrit words for "hemispherical dome" i.e.stupa.

== Products ==
Dagoba currently sells specialty chocolate bars, baking chocolate, cacao powder, chocodrops, and drinking chocolate.

As of August 2012, all products are Rainforest Alliance Certified, and the company has dropped fair trade certification, which used to apply to the cacao powder, drinking chocolates, and the discontinued Conacado bar, 73% ChocoDrops and syrup. 100% of the cacao beans used to produce Dagoba Chocolate products are Rainforest Alliance Certified.

=== Chocolate bars ===
Here is a list of the current product line of Dagoba chocolate bars. Percentages indicate the total cocoa content derived from cocoa beans.

- 84% Pure extra Bittersweet
- Rich Dark 74% Bittersweet
- Picante 74%: Spicy chocolate containing chilies, cacao nibs, nutmeg, orange and vanilla.
- Dark 59% Semisweet
- Lavender Blueberry 59%: Contains wild blueberries and flavored with lavender essential oil.
- Ginger Lime 37%: Milk flavored with crystallized ginger and lime essential oil.
- Milk 37%
- White Chocolate 37%: Contains raspberries, vanilla and peppermint essential oil.

Dagoba Chocolate also produces a line of Drinking Chocolates:

- Unsweetened: Non-dutched cacao powder with bits of 100% dark chocolate.
- Authentic: Non-dutched cacao powder with bits of 100% dark chocolate, and cane sugar.
- Xocolatl: Non-dutched cacao powder, 100% chocolate bits, cane sugar, chiles and cinnamon.

Dagoba Chocolate also produces the following items:

- Cacao powder, non-dutched
- Chocolate Drops, 74% bittersweet
- Baking Bars in 59% and 100%
