= The Hershey Company =

American food company

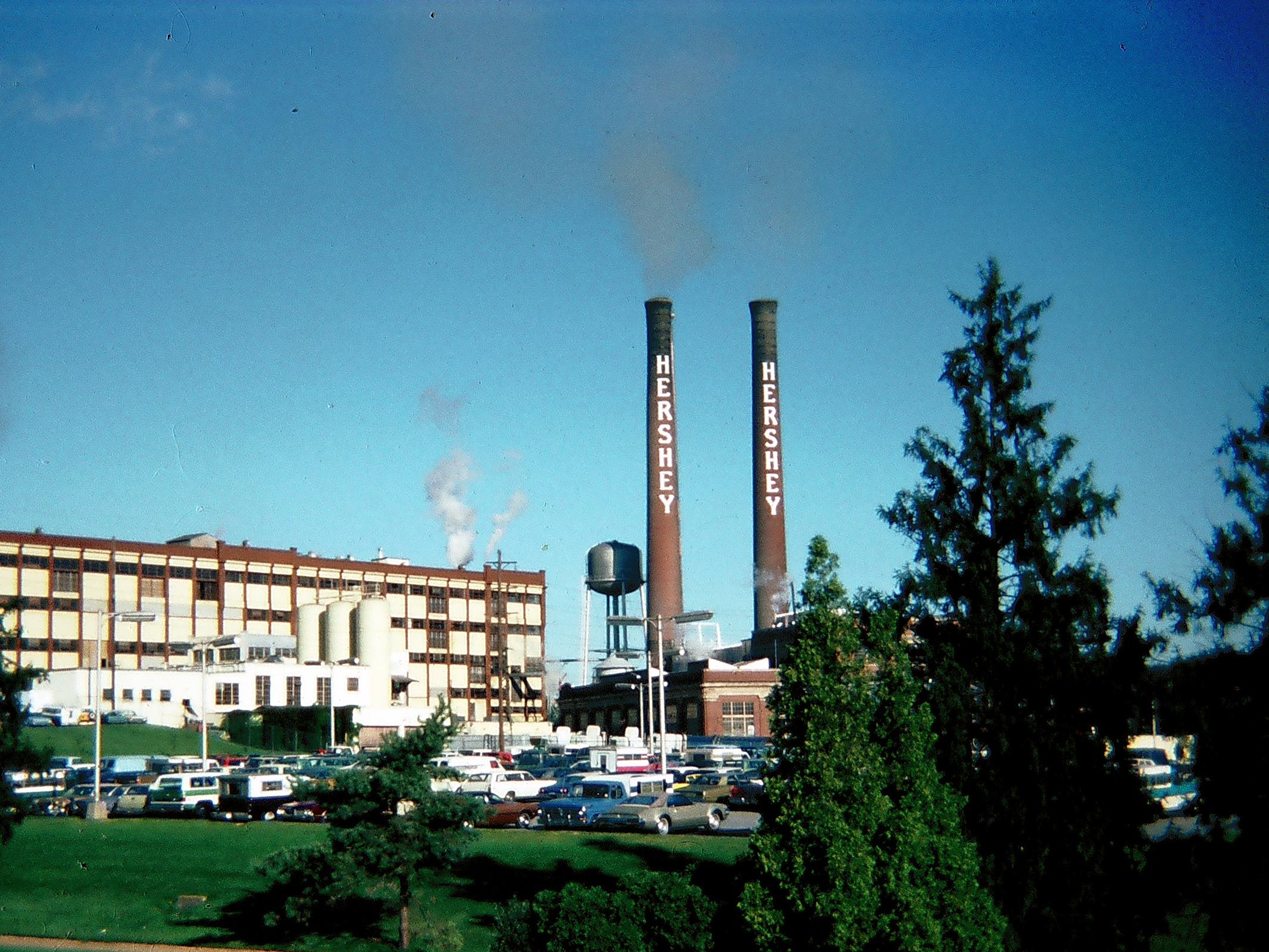
- The original Hershey's factory in 1976
- Trade name: Hershey's
- Formerly: Hershey Chocolate Co. (1894–1927); Hershey Chocolate Corporation (1927–68); Hershey Foods Corporation (1968–2005)
- Type: Public
- Traded as: NYSE: HSY; S&P 500 component
- ISIN: US4278661081
- Industry: Confectionery
- Predecessor: Lancaster Caramel Company
- Founded: February 8, 1894; 132 years ago (as Hershey Chocolate Company) in Lancaster, Pennsylvania, U.S.
- Founder: Milton S. Hershey
- Headquarters: Hershey, Pennsylvania, U.S.
- Number of locations: 19 plants (2022)
- Area served: Worldwide
- Key people: Kirk Tanner (president and CEO); Steven Voskuil (CFO)
- Brands: List of the Hershey Company brands
- Revenue: ▲US$11.7 billion (2025)
- Operating income: ▼US$1.44 billion (2025)
- Net income: ▼US$883 million (2025)
- Total assets: ▲US$13.7 billion (2025)
- Total equity: ▼US$4.64 billion (2025)
- Owner: Hershey Trust Company (minority equity; majority vote share)
- Number of employees: 17,550 (2025)
- Subsidiaries: The Hershey Salty Snacks Company
- Website: thehersheycompany.com

The Hershey Company, often called Hershey or Hershey's, is an American multinational confectionery company headquartered in Hershey, Pennsylvania, which is also home to Hersheypark and Hershey's Chocolate World. The Hershey Company is one of the largest chocolate manufacturers in the world; it also manufactures baked products, such as cookies and cakes and beverages like milkshakes, as well as other products (through mergers and acquisitions). The Hershey Company was founded by Milton S. Hershey in 1894 as the Hershey Chocolate Company, originally established as a subsidiary of his Lancaster Caramel Company. The Hershey Trust Company owns a minority stake but retains a majority of the voting power within the company.

Hershey's chocolate is available in 60 countries. It has three large distribution centers with modern labor management systems. In addition, Hershey is a member of the World Cocoa Foundation. It is also associated with the Hersheypark Stadium and the Giant Center.

The Hershey Company has no affiliation to Hershey Creamery Company, though both companies were founded in Lancaster County, Pennsylvania, in the same year. The companies have had a tumultuous relationship marked by multiple legal battles over trademark issues. In the mid-1990s, the companies settled their most recent legal battles out of court, with Hershey Creamery Company agreeing to add a disclaimer to its ice cream products to note that it is not affiliated with the Hershey Company.

== History ==
=== 19th century ===
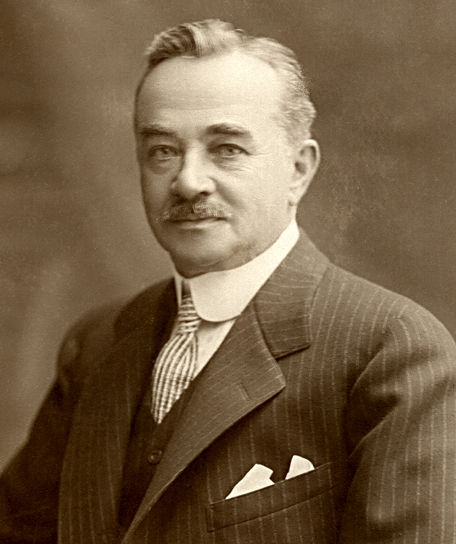
Milton S. Hershey, the company's founder

After an apprenticeship to a Lancaster confectioner in 1873, Milton S. Hershey opened a candy shop in Philadelphia. The venture failed, and so did a subsequent one in Chicago. After a third failed business attempt in New York City, Hershey returned to Pennsylvania, where he founded the Lancaster Caramel Company in 1883. The Hershey Chocolate Company was founded in 1894 as a subsidiary of Lancaster Caramel Company.

In 1896, Hershey built a milk-processing plant so he could create and refine a recipe for his milk chocolate candies. In 1899, he developed the Hershey process, which is less sensitive to milk quality than traditional methods. In 1900, he began manufacturing the Hershey's Milk Chocolate bar.

=== 20th century ===
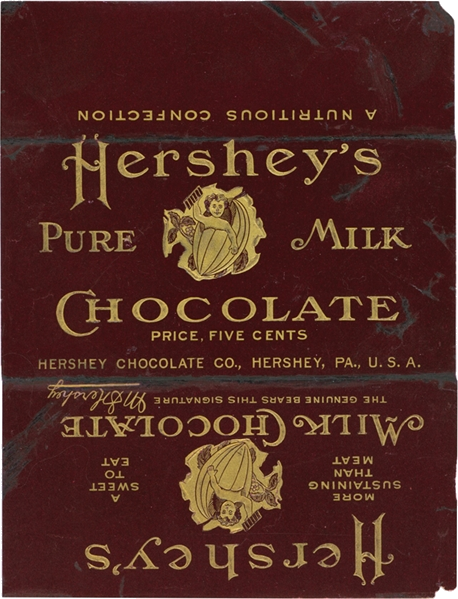
Hershey's chocolate wrapper in 1903

The use of fresh milk in caramels proved successful, and in 1900, after seeing chocolate-making machines for the first time at the 1893 World's Columbian Exposition in Chicago, Hershey sold his caramel company for $1,000,000 (equal to $38,700,000 today), and concentrated on chocolate. To people who questioned him, he said, "Caramels are just a fad, but chocolate is a permanent thing."

In 1902, the distinctive brown wrapper was introduced, replacing an earlier white wrapper. Gold lettering was initially used, but was later replaced by silver lettering following complaints from the Peter's Chocolate company, which already used a brown wrapper and gold lettering for its milk chocolate bars.

In 1903, Hershey began construction of a chocolate plant in his hometown of Derry Church, Pennsylvania, later known as Hershey, Pennsylvania. The town was an inexpensive place for the workers and their families to live, though the factory was built without windows, so that employees would not be distracted. To increase employee morale, Hershey provided leisure activities and created what would later become Hersheypark. The milk chocolate bars from this plant proved popular, and the company grew rapidly.

In 1905, the Hershey Chocolate Company relocated from Lancaster, Pennsylvania to Hershey, Pennsylvania when the original chocolate factory in Hershey was completed.

In 1907, he introduced a new candy: bite-sized, flat-bottomed, conical pieces of chocolate that he named Hershey's Kiss. At first, each was wrapped by hand in a square of aluminum foil. The introduction of machine wrapping in 1921 sped up the process and added a small paper ribbon to the top of the package, indicating that it was a genuine Hershey product. Today, over 70 million candies are produced daily.

Other products introduced included Mr. Goodbar (peanuts in milk chocolate) in 1925, Hershey's Syrup in 1926, semi-sweet chocolate chips (a mixture of milk and dark chocolate) in 1928, and the Krackel bar with crisped rice in 1938.

=== Milton Hershey School (MHS) ===
Unable to have children of his own, Milton S. Hershey, founder of the Hershey Company, founded the Hershey Industrial School in 1909 for white orphaned boys. In 1918, three years after the death of his wife, Milton Hershey donated around $90 million to the boarding school in trust, as well as 40% of the Hershey Company's common stock. The school's initial purpose was to train young men in trades but eventually shifted to focus on preparation for college. The Hershey Trust Company has exercised voting rights for the school and has been a trustee since its founding.

Many of its designs resemble Hershey chocolate products, such as the Hershey Kisses street lights. Milton Hershey was involved in the school's operations until his death in 1945. The Hershey Industrial School was renamed the Milton Hershey School in 1951.

==== Reese's Peanut Butter Cups ====
Harry Burnett Reese invented Reese's Peanut Butter Cups after founding the H. B. Reese Candy Company in 1923. Reese died on May 16, 1956, in West Palm Beach, Florida, leaving the company to his six sons. On July 2, 1963, the H. B. Reese Candy Company merged with the Hershey Chocolate Corporation in a tax-free stock-for-stock merger. In 1969, only six years after the Reese/Hershey merger, Reese's Peanut Butter Cups became the Hershey Company's top seller. As of September 20, 2012, Reese's was the best-selling candy brand in the United States, with sales of $2.603 billion, and the fourth-best-selling brand globally, with sales of $2.679 billion. In 2026, after 63 years of stock splits, the original 666,316 shares of Hershey common stock received by the Reese family represent 16 million Hershey shares valued at more than $4.4 billion, paying annual cash dividends of $92.9 million.

==== Unionization ====
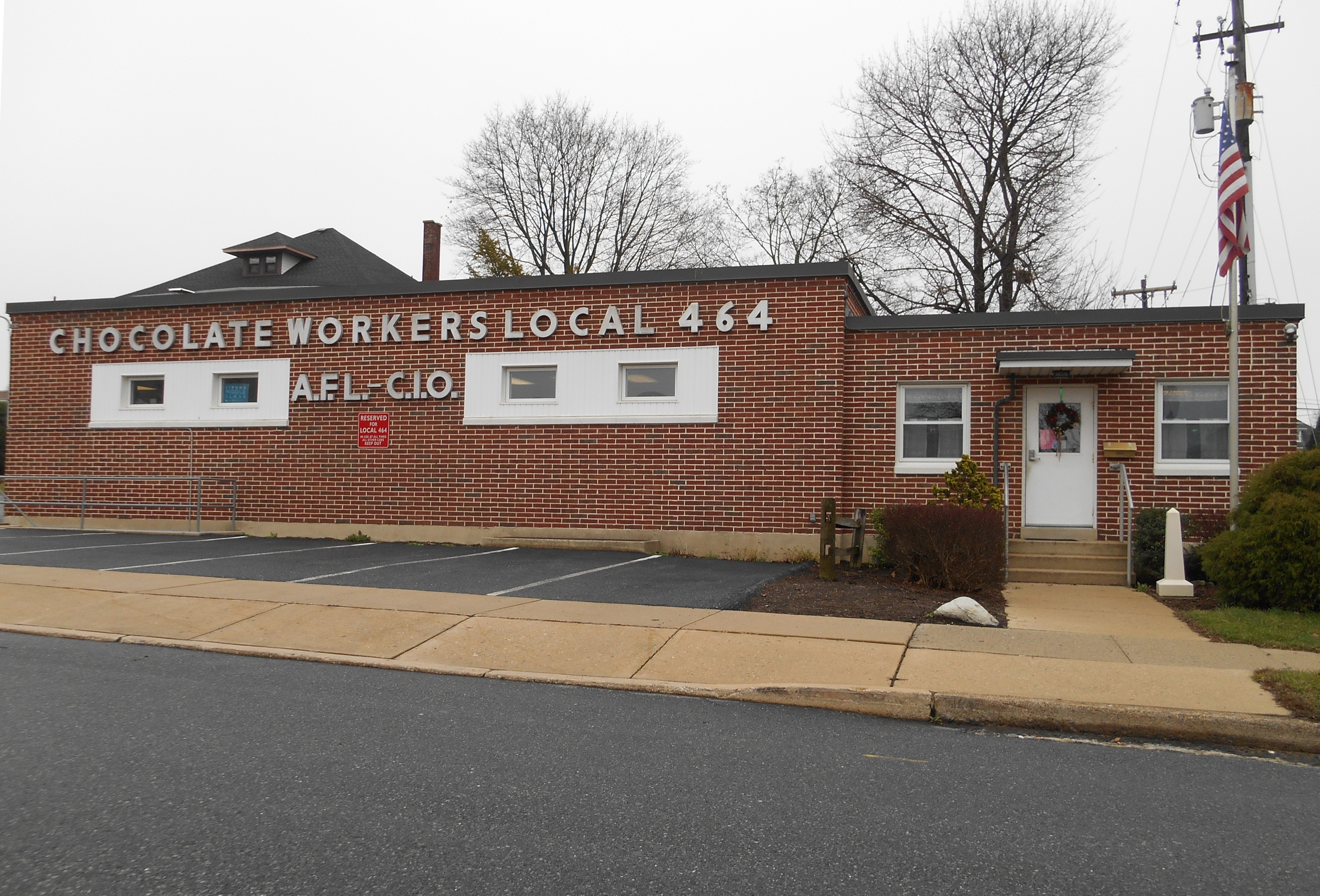
Hershey Union Hall

In the late 1930s, Hershey confronted labor unrest as a Congress of Industrial Organizations-backed union attempted to organize the factory workers. A failed sit-down strike in 1937 ended in violence; loyalist workers and local dairy farmers beat many of the strikers as they attempted to leave the plant. By 1940, an affiliate of the American Federation of Labor successfully organized Hershey's workers under the leadership of John Shearer, who became the first president of Local Chapter Number 464 of the Bakery, Confectionery, Tobacco Workers and Grain Millers' International Union. Local 464 now represents the Hershey workforce.

==== Atlantic City soap venture ====
From around 1938 to 1952, Milton Hershey tried to make toilet soap, which saw a big boom after the Great Depression as well as other hygiene-related items such as shampoo, toothpaste and perfume. Hershey took this opportunity to try to open a store on the Atlantic City Boardwalk, which sold cocoa butter scented toilet soap. The shop was a success for several decades, and the soap's production was sourced from Hershey Estates. Other soaps such as keystone soap, tar soap and shaving soap were also sold at the shop. Product distribution extended from New York City to Baltimore by 1953, when the shop closed down.

==== M&M's ====
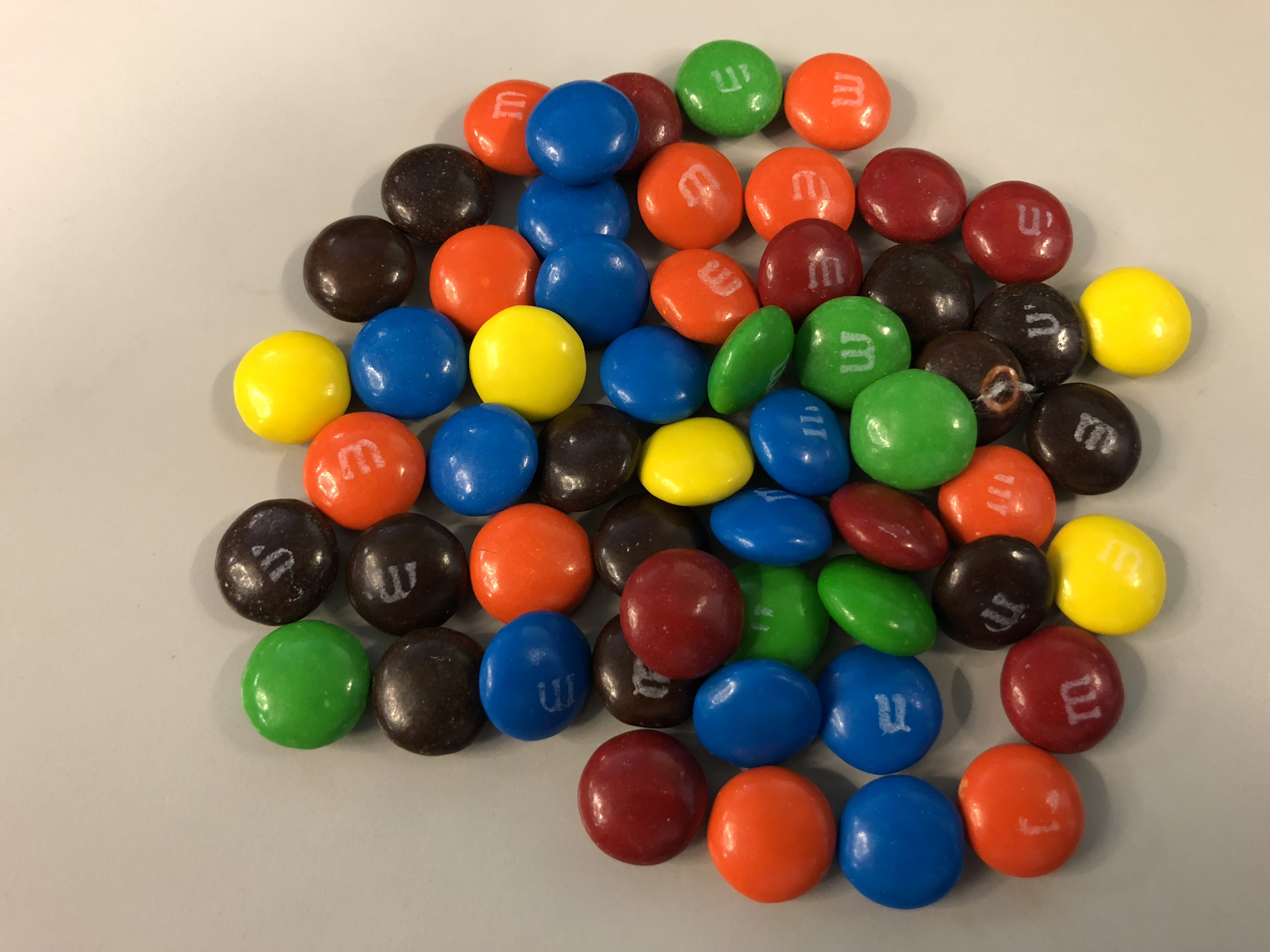
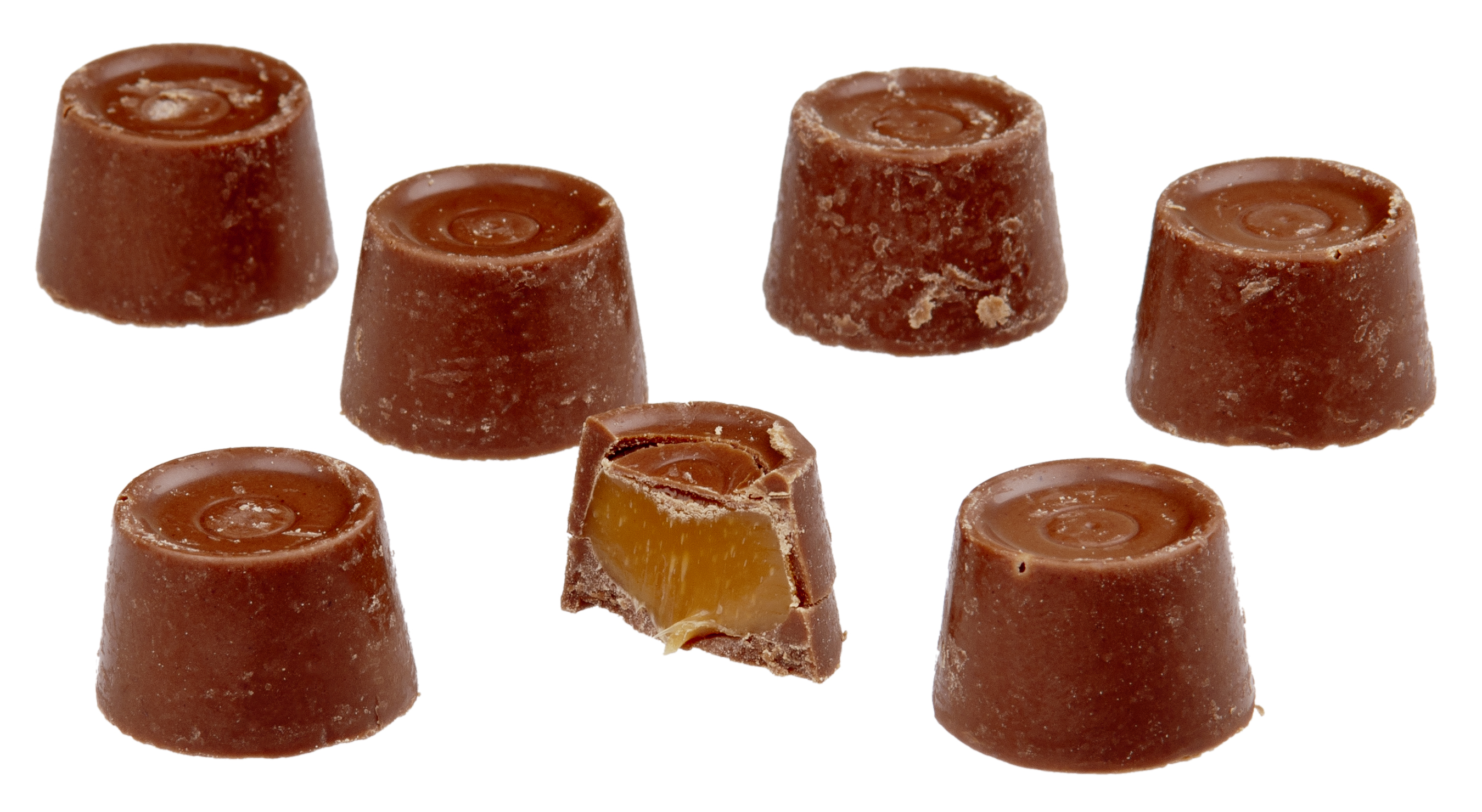
M&M's button-shaped chocolates (left) were developed by Hershey and Mars in the 1930s, while Rolo bonbons (right) were produced by Hershey under license.

Shortly before World War II, Bruce Murrie, son of long-time Hershey's president William F.R. Murrie, struck a deal with Forrest Mars to create hard sugar-coated chocolates that would be called M&M's (for Mars and Murrie). Murrie had a 20% interest in the product, which used Hershey chocolate during World War II rationing. In 1948, Mars bought out Murrie and became one of Hershey's main competitors.

==== Kit Kat and Rolo ====
In 1969, Hershey received a perpetual license from UK-based Rowntree's to manufacture and market Kit Kat and Rolo in the United States. After Hershey's competitor Nestlé acquired Rowntree's in 1988, it was still required to honor the agreement, and so Hershey continues to make and market the products in the U.S. under a "change of control" clause, the license would revert to Nestlé if Hershey were sold. This became a sticking point in Hershey's failed attempt to attract a serious buyer in 2002, and even Nestlé rejected Hershey's asking price, feeling that the economics would not work.

==== Cadbury ====
In 1988, Hershey's acquired the rights to manufacture and distribute many Cadbury-branded products in the United States (except gum and mints, which are part of Mondelēz International). In 2015, they sued a British importer to halt imports of British Cadbury chocolate, which reportedly angered consumers. A merger between Mondelēz and Hershey's was considered but abandoned in 2016 after Hershey's turned down a $23 billion cash-and-stock bid.

=== 20th century sales and acquisitions ===
In 1977, Hershey acquired Y&S Candies (based in nearby Lancaster), makers of Twizzlers licorice candies, founded in 1845.

In 1986, Hershey's made a brief foray into cough drops when it acquired the Luden's cough drops brand. In 2001, the brand was sold to Pharmacia, now part of Pfizer, and Luden's later was acquired by Prestige Brands. Hershey's kept Luden's 5th Avenue bar.

In 1996, Hershey purchased the American operations of the Leaf Candy Company from Huhtamäki. In 1999, the Hershey Pasta Group was divested to several equity partners to form the New World Pasta company, which is now part of Ebro Foods.

=== 21st century ===
On July 25, 2002, Hershey Trust Company announced that it sought to sell its controlling interest in the Hershey Foods Corporation. The value of Hershey stock rose 25% in a single day, with over 19 million shares traded. Over the following 55 days, criticism of the intended sale from media, the Pennsylvania Attorney General, the Hershey, and Dauphin County Orphans' Court senior judge, led the company to abandon its attempt to sell the company. Seven Hershey trustees who voted to sell Hershey Foods on September 17, 2002, for US$12.5 billion to the Wrigley Company, which is now part of Mars, Incorporated, were removed by Pennsylvania's Attorney and the Dauphin County Orphans' Court judge. Ten of the 17 trustees were forced to resign and four new members who lived locally were appointed. Former Pennsylvania Attorney General LeRoy S. Zimmerman became the new chairman of the reconstituted Milton Hershey School Trustees. Zimmerman publicly committed to having the Milton Hershey School Trust always maintain its ownership of the Hershey Company.

In December 2004, Hershey acquired the Mauna Loa Macadamia Nut Corp. from The Shansby Group.

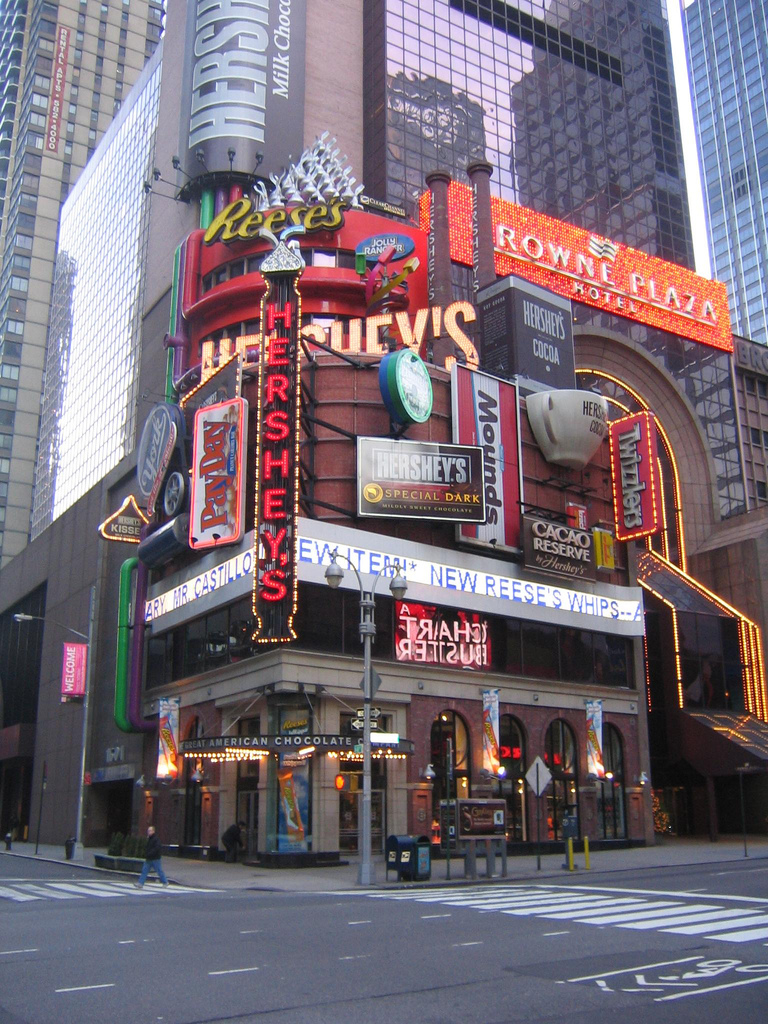
The Hershey's Chocolate World store in Times Square in Manhattan in 2008

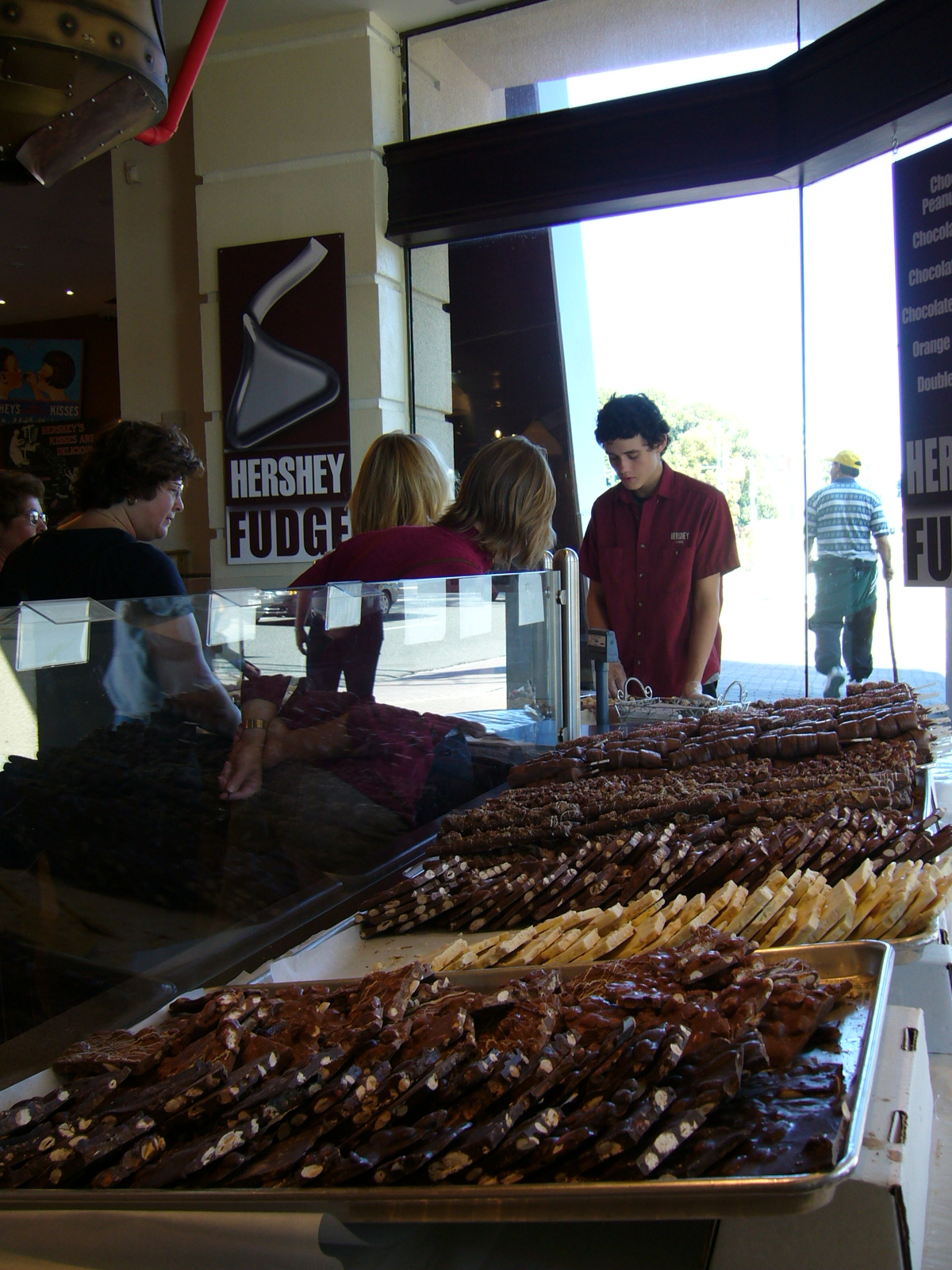
Hershey Store located in the Falls Avenue Entertainment Complex in Niagara Falls, Canada in 2005

In 2005, Krave Jerky was founded by Jon Sebastiani after he trained for a marathon and looked for a healthy source of energy. Alliance Consumer Growth, a private equity group, invested in Krave Jerky in 2012. Hershey's purchased the company in 2015 for $240 million. Hershey would later in 2020 sell Krave Jerky to Sonoma Brands, the food industry incubator founded by Sebastiani in 2016.

In July 2005, Hershey acquired the Berkeley, California-based boutique chocolate-maker Scharffen Berger Chocolate Maker. In November 2005, Hershey acquired Joseph Schmidt Confections, the San Francisco-based chocolatier, and in November 2006, Hershey acquired Dagoba Organic Chocolate, a boutique chocolate maker based in Ashland, Oregon.

In June 2006, Philadelphia city councilman Juan Ramos called for Hershey's to stop marketing "Ice Breakers Pacs", a kind of mint, due to the resemblance of its packaging to a kind that was used for illegal street drugs.

In September 2006, ABC News reported that several Hershey chocolate products were reformulated to replace cocoa butter with vegetable oil as an emulsifier. According to the company, this change was made to reduce the costs of producing the products instead of raising their prices or decreasing the sizes. Some consumers complained that the taste was different, but the company stated that in the company-sponsored blind taste tests, about half of consumers preferred the new versions. As the new versions no longer met the Food and Drug Administration's official definition of "milk chocolate", the changed items were relabeled from stating they were "milk chocolate" and "made with chocolate" to "chocolate candy" and "chocolatey."

In November 2006, the Smiths Falls production plant in Ontario temporarily shut down and several products were voluntarily recalled after concerns over Salmonella contamination possibly found in soy lecithin within their production line. It was believed that most of the products involved in the recall never made it to the retail level.

In December 2011, Hershey reached an agreement to acquire Brookside Foods Ltd., a privately held confectionery company based in Abbotsford, British Columbia.

In 2015, Hershey committed to source 100% cage-free eggs in their global supply chain by 2025.

In 2016, Hershey acquired barkTHINS, a New York-based chocolate snack foods company for $290 million.

An August 2016 attempt to sell Hershey to Mondelez International was abandoned following objections by the Hershey Trust.

Amplify Snack Brands, Inc.
- Type: Public
- Traded as: NYSE: BETR (2016–2017)
- Industry: Food processing
- Founded: 2010; 16 years ago
- Defunct: 2017; 9 years ago
- Headquarters: Austin, Texas, U.S.
- Brands: SkinnyPop; Paqui
- Revenue: 10,419,294,000 United States dollar (2022)
- Operating income: 2,260,787,000 United States dollar (2022)
- Net income: 1,644,817,000 United States dollar (2022)

In 2017, Hershey acquired Amplify Snack Brands, the Austin, Texas-based manufacturer of SkinnyPop in an all-cash transaction valued at approximately $1.6 billion. In September 2018, Hershey announced the purchase of Pirate Brands from B&G Foods for $420 million in an all-cash deal. These acquisitions marked Hershey's expansion into non-confectionery products.

In August 2019, Hershey announced it would purchase protein bar maker One Brands LLC for $397 million. In October 2019, Hershey announced a collaboration with Yuengling to produce a limited release collaboration beer titled Yuengling Hershey's Chocolate Porter, becoming Hershey's first licensed beer partnership. In June 2021, Hershey acquired Lily's for $425 million. In November 2021, Hershey announced plans to acquire Dot’s Homestyle Pretzels, and their co-packer, Pretzel INC for $1.2B.

In 2019, Hershey announced that they could not guarantee that their chocolate products were free from child slave labor, as they could trace only about 50% of their purchasing back to the farm level. According to The Washington Post, the commitment made in 2001 to eradicate such practices within four years had not been kept, neither at the due deadline of 2005, nor within the revised deadlines of 2008 and 2010, and that the result was not likely to be achieved for 2020.

In 2021, Hershey and six other food multinationals were named in a class action lawsuit filed by eight former child slaves from Mali who alleged that the company aided and abetted their enslavement on cocoa plantations in Ivory Coast. The suit accused Hershey, Nestlé, Cargill, Mars, Incorporated, Olam International, Barry Callebaut, and Mondelez International of knowingly engaging in forced labor, and the plaintiffs sought damages for unjust enrichment, negligent supervision, and intentional infliction of emotional distress. The case was dismissed by U.S. District Judge Dabney Friedrich in 2022.

In December 2022, Hershey was subjected to a lawsuit over the amount of lead and cadmium in the company's products, especially the Special Dark bar, the 70% Lily Bar, and the 85% Lily Bar. The lawsuit alleged that the company failed to warn consumers about the amount of metal in the bars and was based on findings published by the Consumer Reports magazine in the United States.

In 2023, the company entered the field of plant-based chocolate concocted with dairy alternatives. The snacks are marketed as Plant Based Extra Creamy and Plant Based Reese's Peanut Butter Cups.

== Brands ==
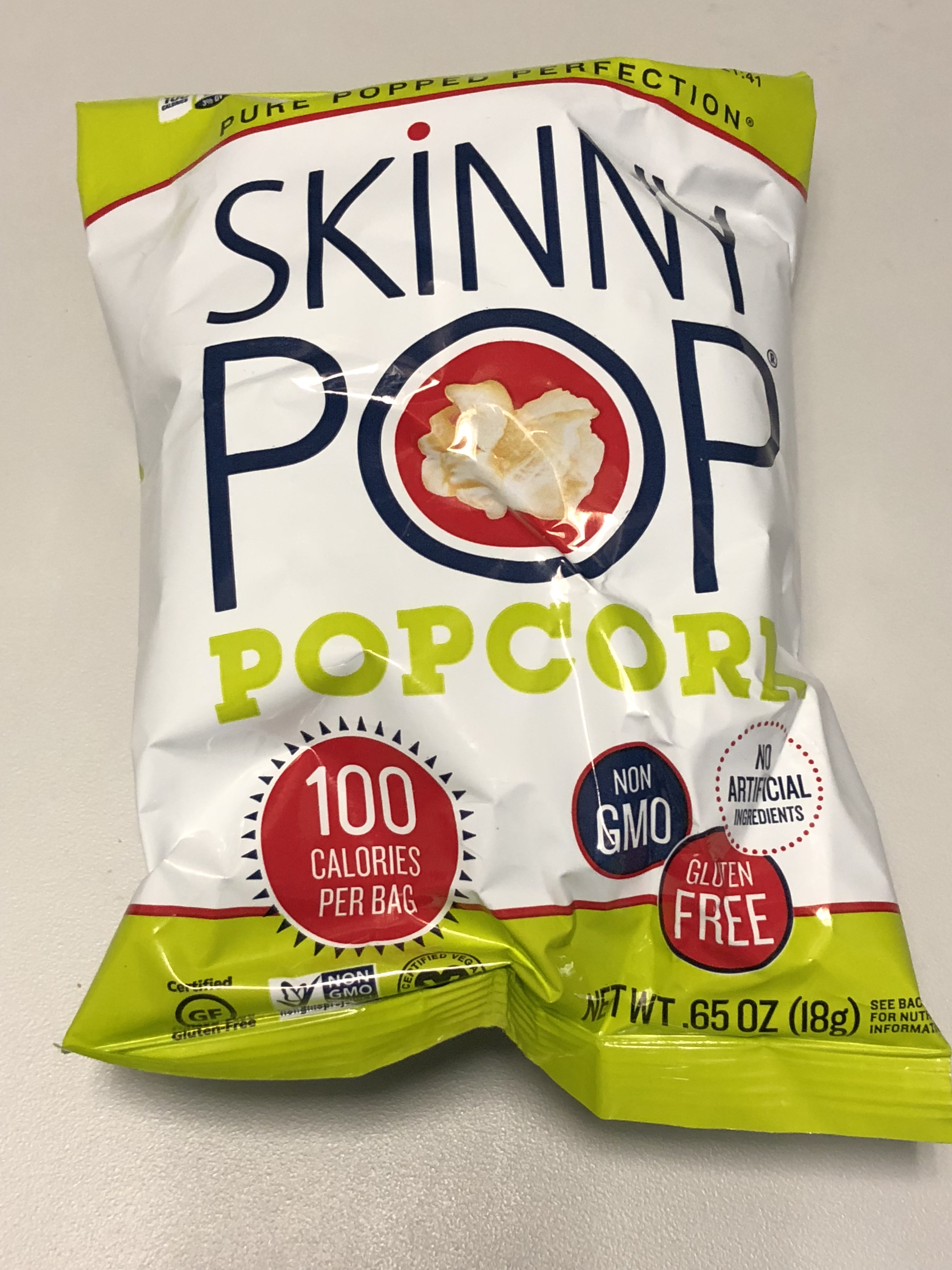
The Hershey Company acquired Skinny Pop Popcorn in 2018 after entering agreements with the Weaver Popcorn Company.

While Hershey brands are mostly chocolate or candy based, they also have gum manufacturing brands, as well as a variety of salty snacks offered on its product list to customers. Its main markets are the U.S. and Canada.

The Hershey Company is continuously offering new innovations to previously made products by adding new ingredients. Other products outside of chocolate have been added to its product lists such as Pirate's Booty, Skinny Pop, and Dots Pretzels.

== Consumer insights ==
The Hershey Company uses consumer insights to better understand the wants and needs of its target market. This can be seen through patterns of buyers in retail environments. What is called the "Hershey Intelligence Engine" approaches consumer behavior by collaboration with industry leading data with retail insights.

== Manufacturing plants ==
The first plant outside Hershey opened on June 15, 1963, in Smiths Falls, Ontario, with Joseph Miller as the manager, and the third opened on May 22, 1965, in Oakdale, California. In February and April 2007, Hershey's announced that the Smiths Falls and Oakdale plants would close in 2008, being replaced in part by a new facility in Monterrey, Mexico. The Oakdale factory closed on February 1, 2008. Hershey chocolate factory in São Roque, Brazil, was opened in August 2002. Hershey's Asia operations were largely supplied by their plant in Mandideep, India.

Hershey also has plants in Stuarts Draft, Virginia, Lancaster, Pennsylvania, Hazleton, Pennsylvania, Memphis, Tennessee, Robinson, Illinois, and Guadalajara, Mexico.

Visitors to Hershey can experience Hershey's Chocolate World visitors center and its simulated tour ride. Public tours were once operated in the Pennsylvania and California factories, which ended in Pennsylvania in 1973 as soon as Hershey's Chocolate World opened, and later in California following the September 11, 2001, attacks, due to security concerns.

On September 18, 2012, Hershey opened a new and expanded West Hershey plant. The plant was completed at a budget of $300 million.

On March 9, 2018, Hershey broke ground to expand its Kit Kat manufacturing facility in Hazle Township, Pennsylvania. The expansion project has a $60 million budget and is expected to create an additional 111 jobs at the facility.

On August 17, 2023, it was announced that Hershey repurchased their plant in Smiths Falls, Ontario for $53 million. The plant was previously owned by cannabis company Canopy Growth.

== Perception outside the U.S. ==
The presence of butyric acid in Hershey's chocolate, due to the use of controlled lipolysis in the production process, results in a flavor considered unpleasant to those accustomed to chocolate made in this manner.

== Gallery ==
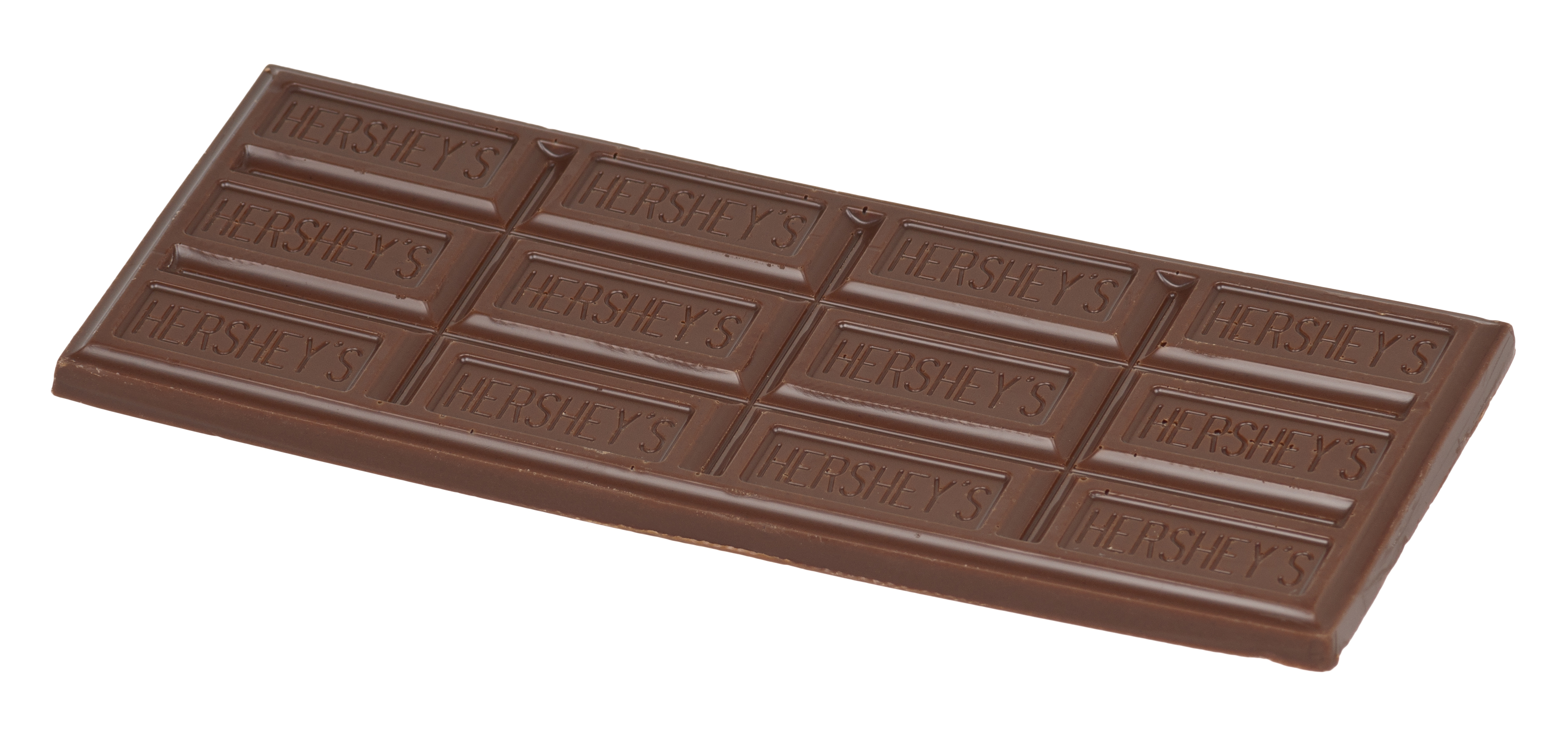
Hershey Chocolate bar

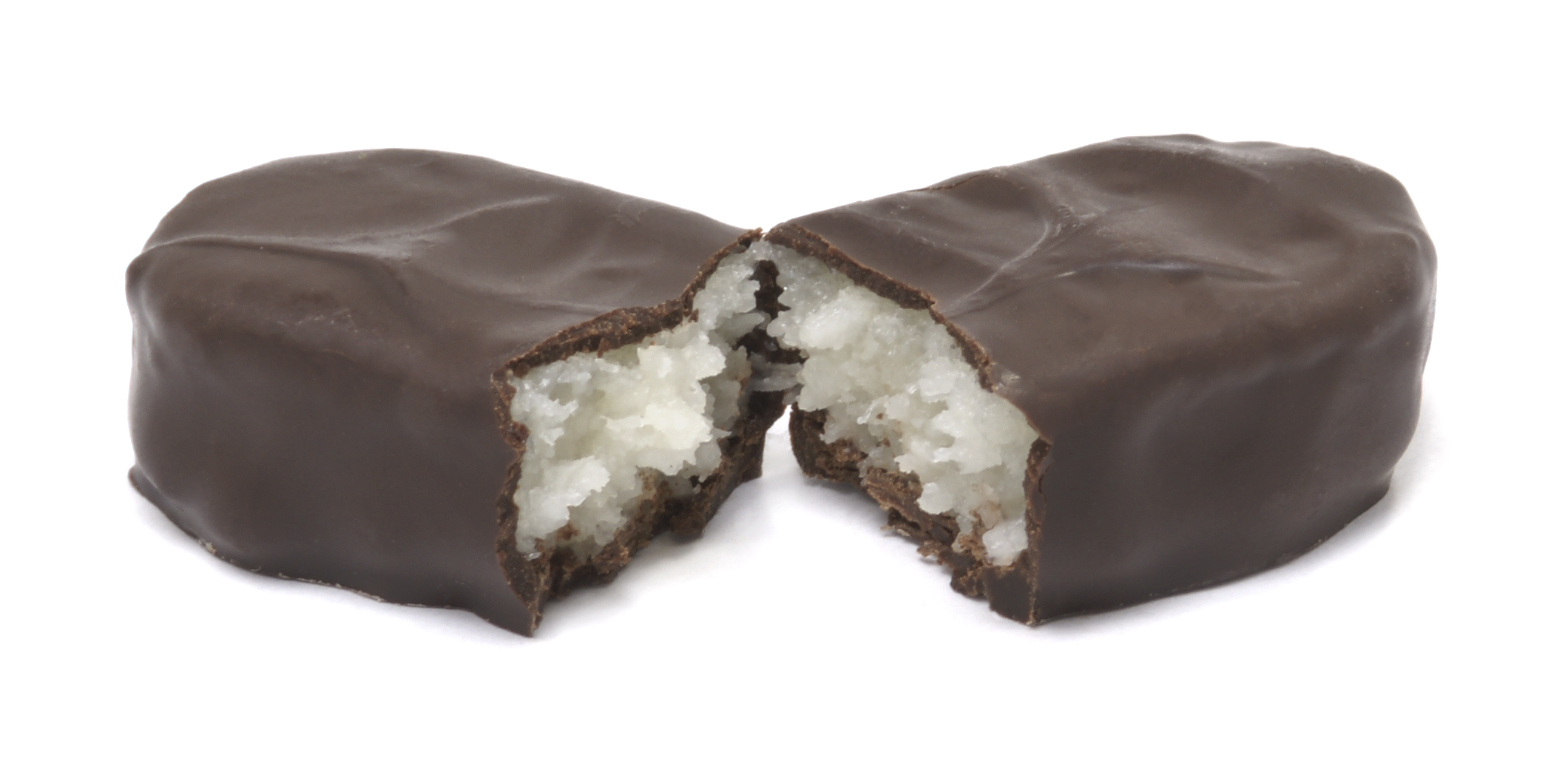
Mounds candy bar

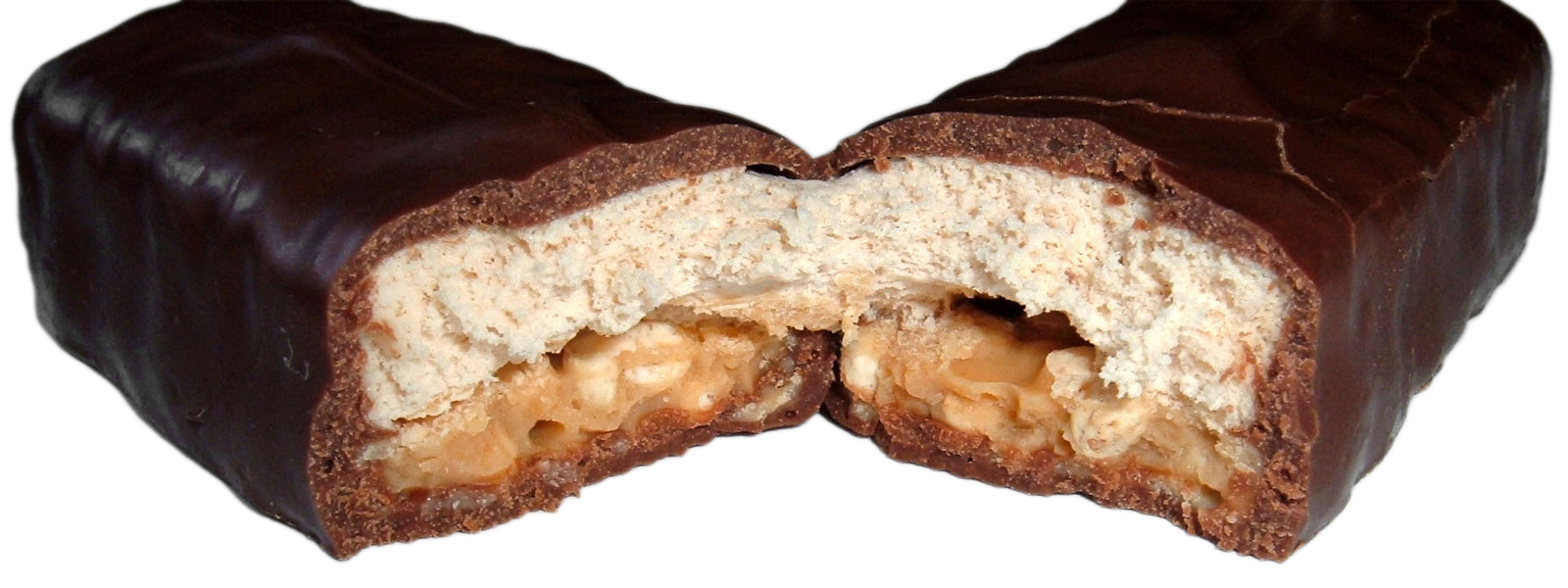
Caramel candy bar

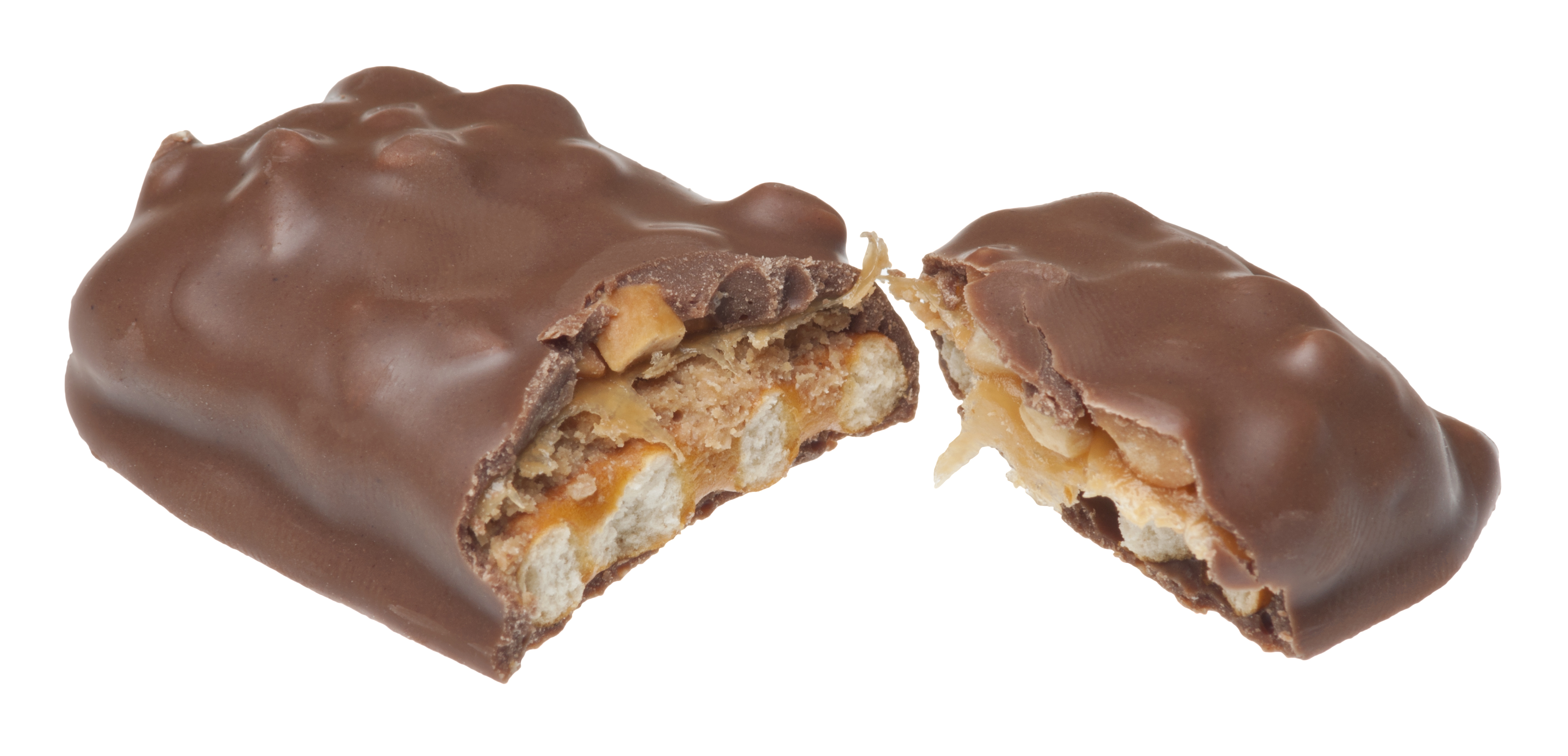
Take5 candy bar

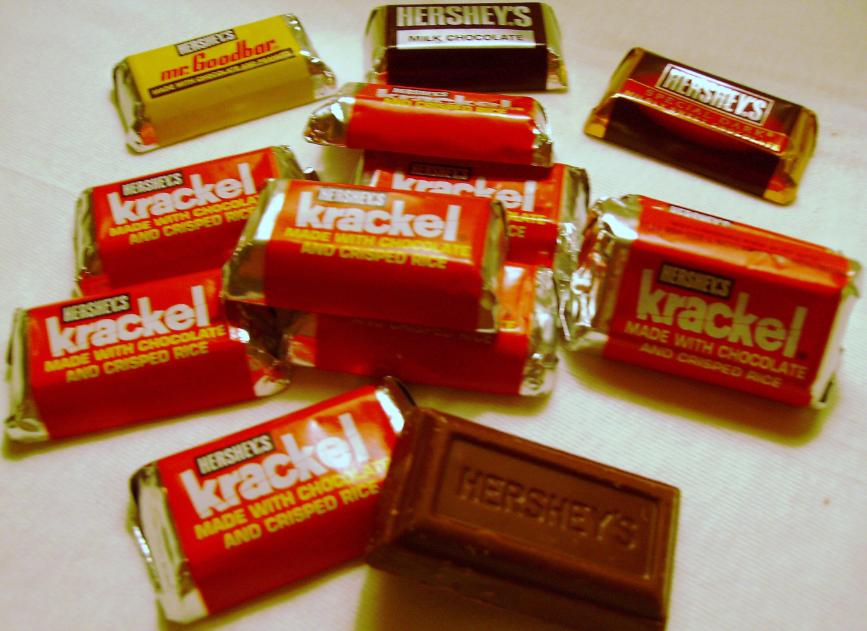
Krackel bars

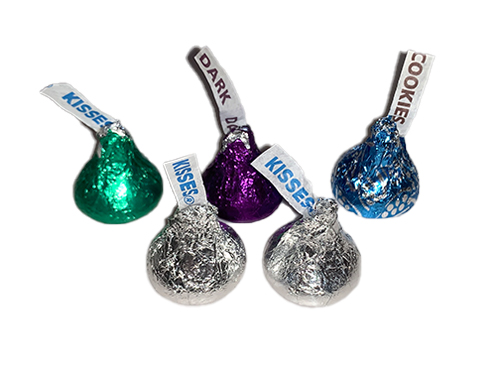
Kisses bonbons

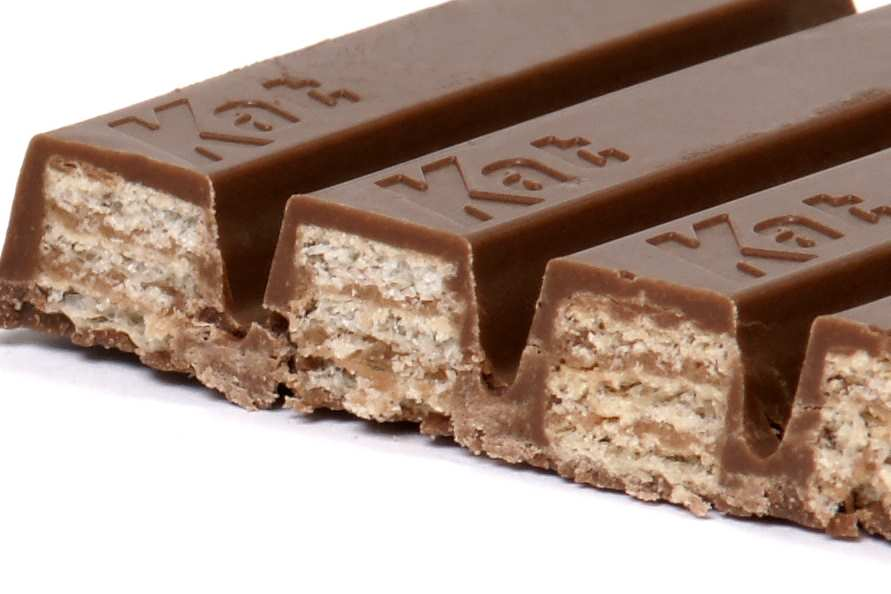
Kit Kat bar

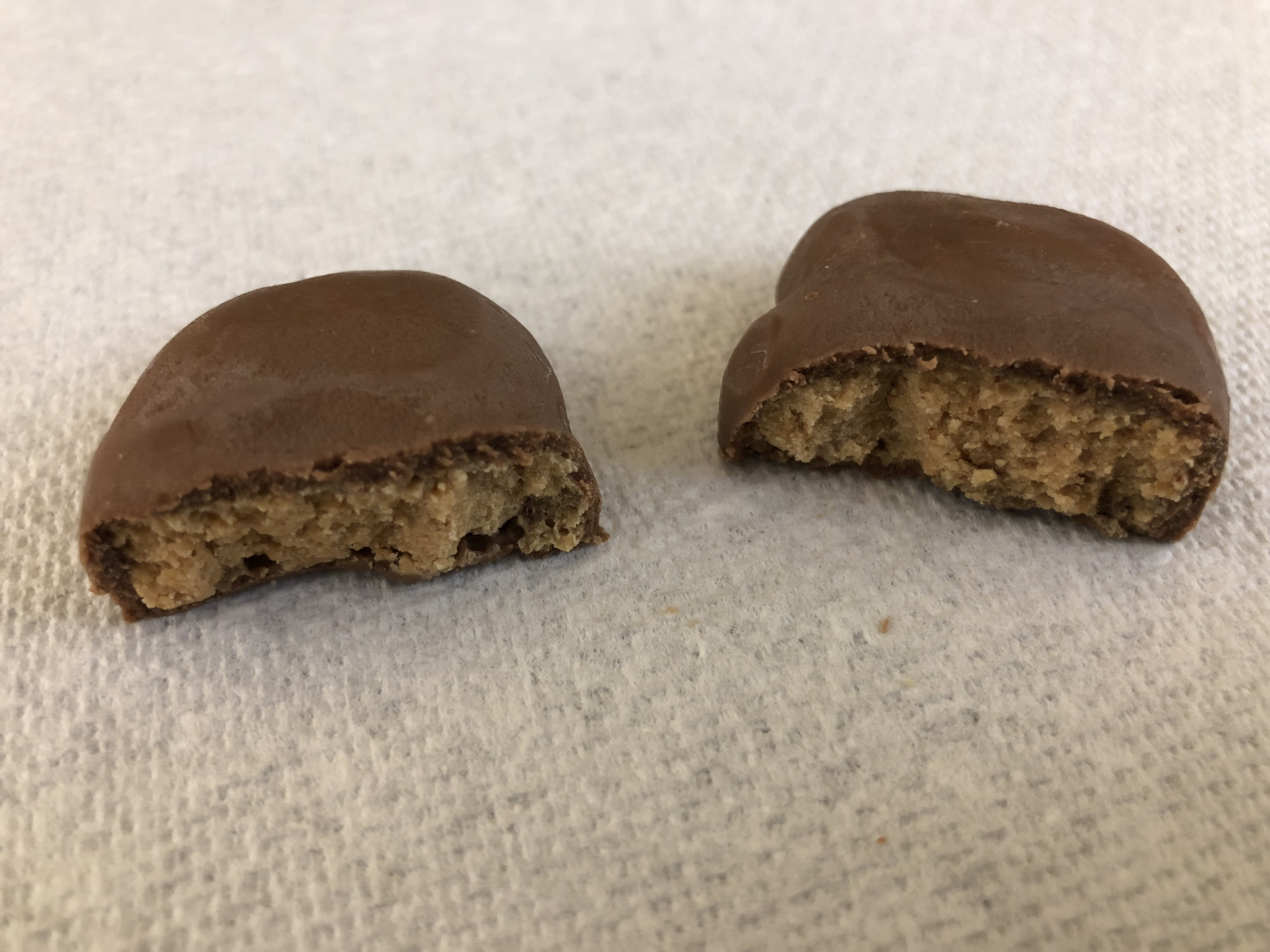
A Reese's Peanut Butter Pumpkin split in half

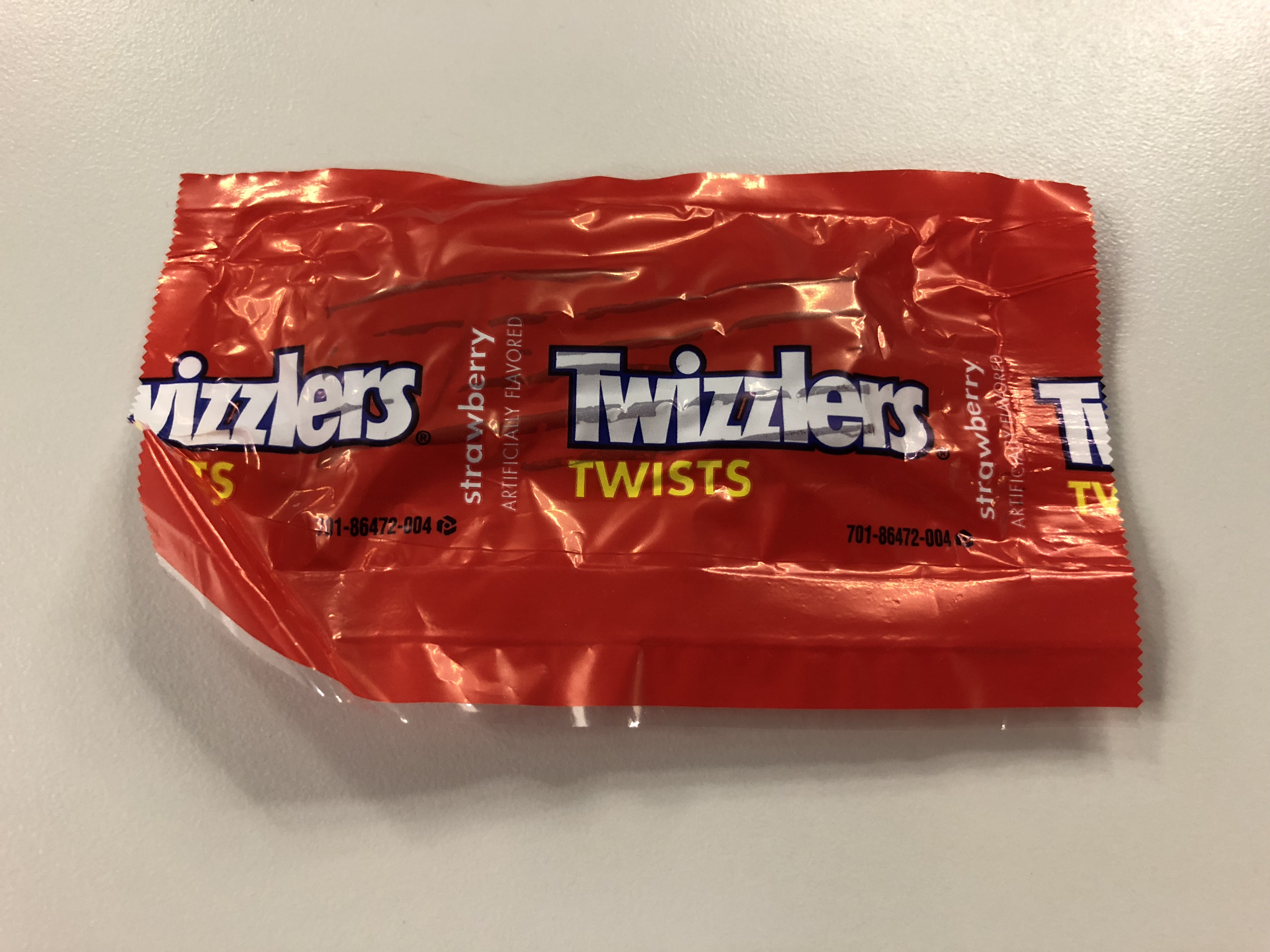
Twizzlers fun size

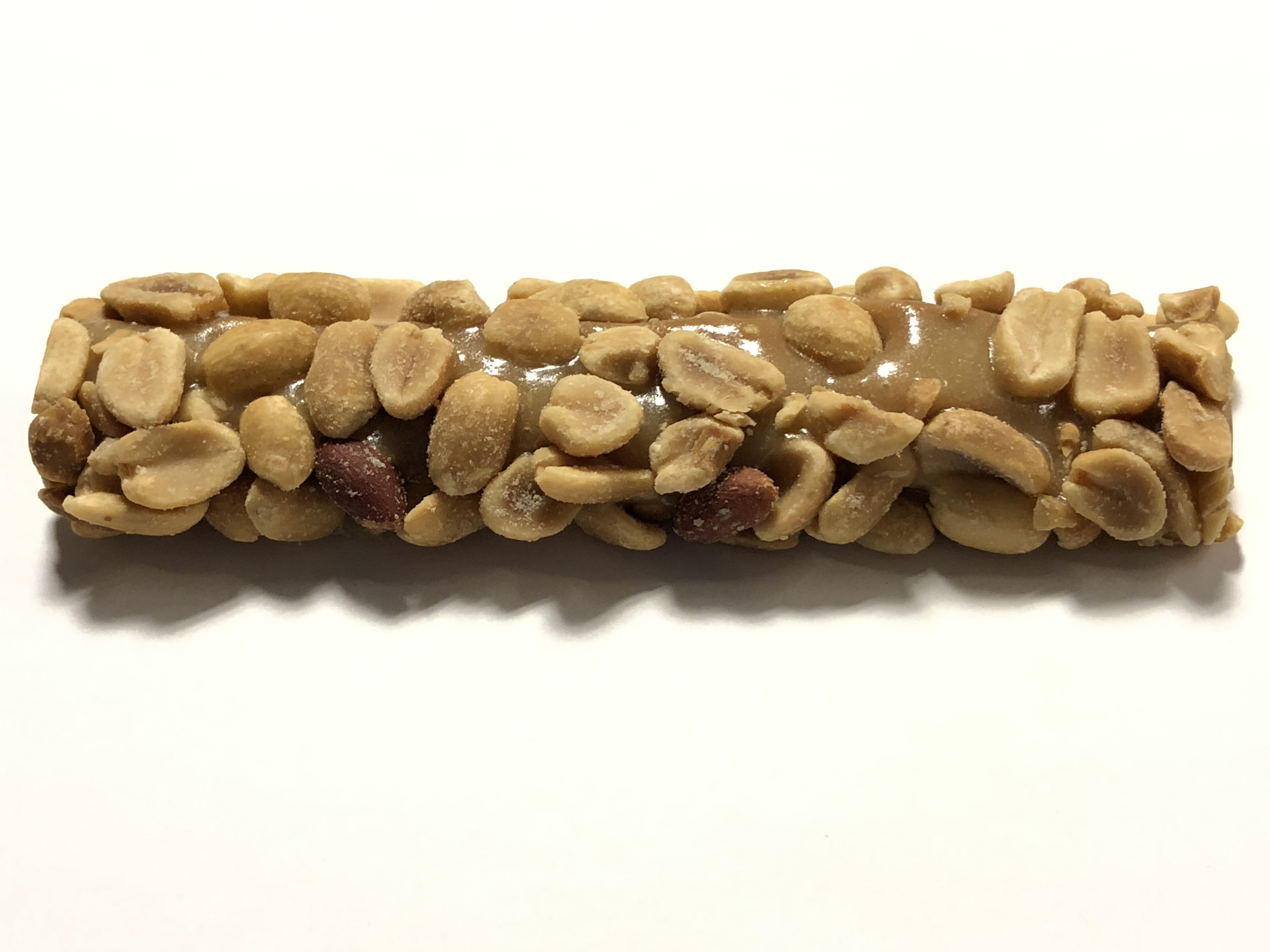
PayDay Peanut Caramel Bar

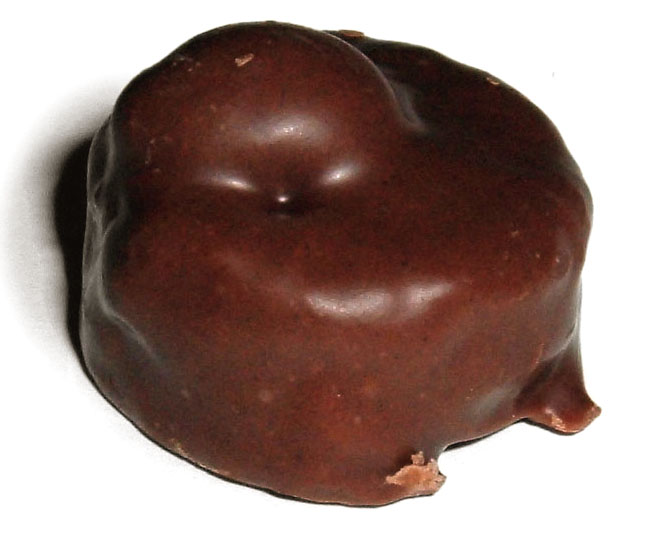
Mini Almond Joy chocolate

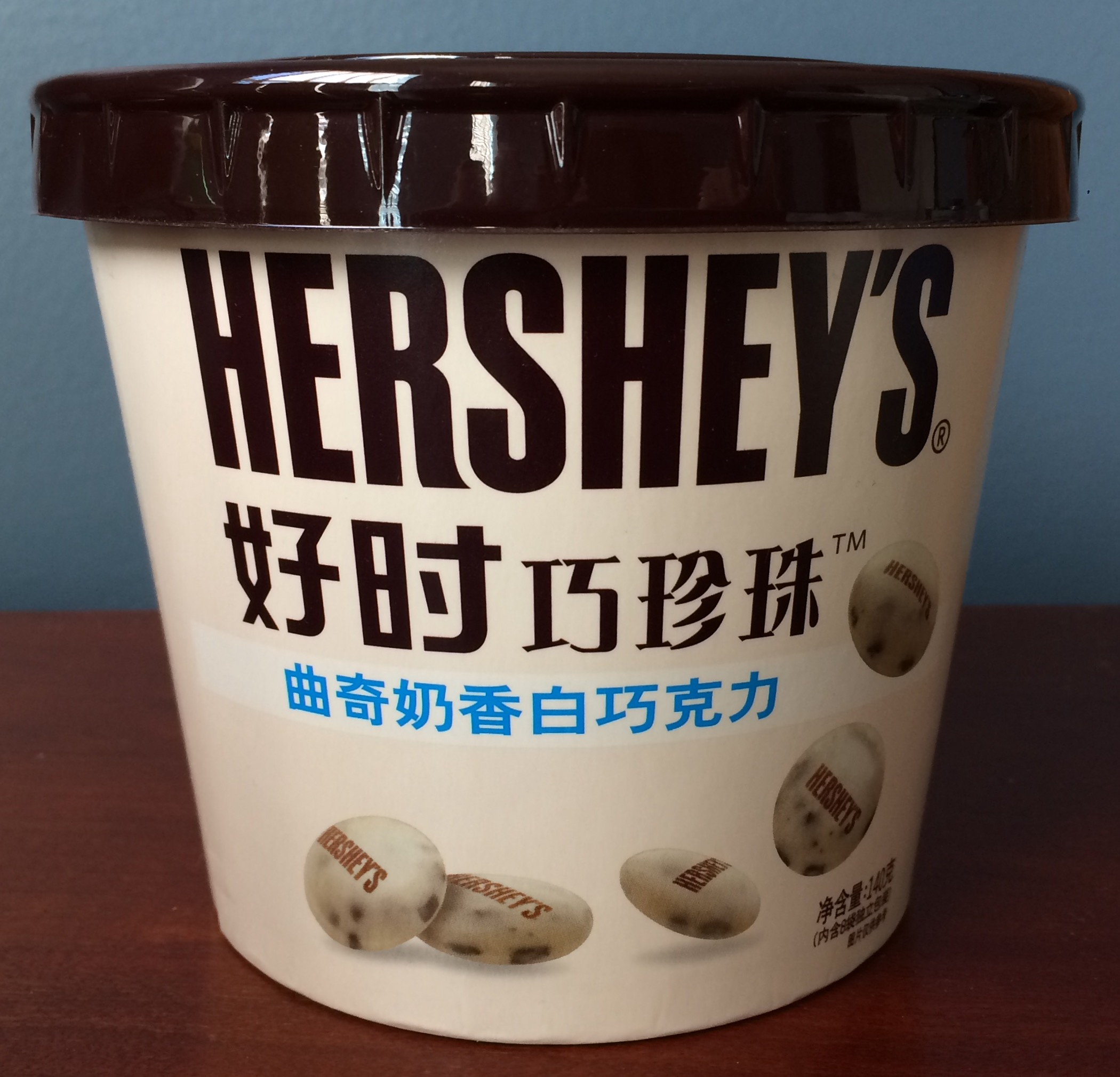
Chinese Cookies 'n' Creme tub

== Additional sources ==
- Brenner, Joël Glenn (2000). The Emperors of Chocolate: Inside the Secret World of Hershey & Mars. Broadway Books. ISBN 0-7679-0457-5.*Our History | HERSHEY'S
- History | The Hotel Hershey
- Official Hershey's chocolate and candy site

== See also ==
- Milton S. Hershey
- List of the Hershey Company brands
- List of food companies
- Pennsylvania chocolate workers' strike, 1937
