= Full-course dinner =

Dinner consisting of multiple dishes

A full-course dinner in much of the Western world is a meal served in multiple courses. Since the 19th century, dinner has generally been served in the evening, but other times ranging from late morning to late afternoon have been historically common.

The dishes served at a multi-course meal often follow a sequence of dishes influenced by French gastronomic principles, generally called the "Classical Order" of table service, which emerged in France in the mid-17th century. The Classical meal includes five stages: potage, entrée (including hors d’œuvres and relevés), roast, entremets (savory and sweet), and dessert.

The idea of ritualized, multi-course meals dates back to at least Ancient Rome, where the midday meal (the cena) began with a gustatio (a variety of herbs and hors d'oeuvres), then continued through three main courses and finished with a dessert.

There are many styles of multi-course table service throughout the world, and the above styles are not a comprehensive list of all such practices.

== Presentation ==
=== Service à la française ===
In service à la française, several stages of the meal, corresponding to the stages of "Classical Service", are placed on the table at the same time. Each stage can be presented in its own course, or the stages can be grouped together to produce a meal of fewer courses. Regardless of the presentation on the table, the stages of the meal were consumed in the "Classical" order, known to those attending the meal but rarely evident in contemporaneous menus or descriptions of meals.

The number of dishes served at the meal depended on the number of guests. Multiple dishes were served for each stage, for example, multiple potages, multiple entrées, multiple roasts, and so on. For a large assembly, the variety of dishes could be staggeringly large, but the guests could sample only some of the dishes.

Meals could range from one to five courses, but from the beginning of the 19th century, the most common arrangement in France was service in 3 courses:

1. Potages + hors d’œuvres + entrées + relevés
2. Roasts + salads + entremets (sweet and savory)
3. Desserts (ices and ice creams, fresh and preserved fruits, and cheese)

=== Service à la russe ===
In service à la russe, individual dishes are brought to the table sequentially and served separately to each guest. Elaborate meals served à la russe generally include 6 or 7 courses, but they may have a dozen or more. The same dish or choice of dishes is offered to each guest at each course. All guests take the soup, but they may decline any other course.

The underlying sequence of dishes corresponds to the "Classical Order" established in service à la française, but there were some changes over time, including oysters or cold hors d’œuvres to start the meal, a separate fish course before the entrées, the loss of the savory entremets course, the emphasis on ices and ice cream in the dessert course, and the loss of the fruit course. After the 1950s, at dinners in the American style, salad became popular as a first course cold hors d’œuvre, an innovation criticized by Louis Diat.

In the late 19th century, Charles Ranhofer outlined in detail the dishes necessary for restaurant dinners ranging from five to fourteen courses. His five-course dinner includes soup, fish, a choice of two entrées, one roast with a salad, and dessert. Longer dinners are created by adding to the menu additional courses of side dishes (the hors d’œuvres of Classical Service), removes (relevés), entrées, frozen punch, cold dishes, and hot and cold sweet desserts (sweet entremets). Some courses include a choice of dishes, as in the soup, side dish, fish, roast, salad, and dessert courses; other courses are presented as multiple dishes in succession, as in the entrée courses. Ranhofer also gives instructions for the appropriate wines at each course. His extensive menu of 14 courses is as follows:

1. Oysters.
2. 2 Soups.
3. S.D. ["side dishes"] hot and cold.
4. 2 Fish, potatoes.
5. 1 Remove, vegetables.
6. 1 Entrée, vegetables.
7. 1 Entrée, vegetables.
8. 1 Entrée, vegetables.
9. 1 Punch.
10. 1 or 2 Roasts.
11. 1 or 2 Colds, salad.
12. 1 Hot sweet dessert.
13. 1 or 2 Cold sweet des'rts.
14. 1 or 2 Ices. Dessert [the last dessert is fruit, served with the ices].

In 1922, Emily Post, arguably the most influential 20th-century writer on American social customs, recommends menus of seven courses for formal meals—cold hors-d’œuvres, soup, fish, entrée, roast, salad, and dessert, followed by after-dinner coffee. "The menu for an informal dinner would leave out the entrée, and possibly either the hors-d’oeuvre or the soup." By 1945, Post writes that the shorter "informal" meal of five courses and after-dinner coffee in the first edition of her book had become the norm for formal dinners at private homes—soup or oysters or melon or clams; fish or entrée; roast; salad; and dessert; followed by after-dinner coffee in the library or drawing room. Wine service could include a separate wine for each course, or champagne may be the only wine after the sherry served with the soup.

In the 1960s, Jackie Kennedy reduced the menus at White House dinners from the seven courses typical of mid-century formal occasions to a mere four courses—fish, meat, salad, and dessert or, on lean days, (Note: In accordance with church regulations in force from the Middle Ages to the 19th century, the ingredients for every stage of the meal varied between "meat days" (jours gras, literally "fat days"), when all foods were allowed, and "lean days" (jours maigres), when the church forbade consumption of meat and fowl but not fish. Until the 16th century, white meats (milk, cream, butter, and cheese) and eggs were additionally forbidden in Lent. Beginning in the 17th century, white meats were allowed in Lent. Beginning in the 19th century, eggs were also allowed in Lent.) soup, fish, salad, and dessert. Dinners of only four courses were not new, but Kennedy’s influence set the style for White House state dinners and other formal dinners through the end of the 20th century.

==== Table setting for Service à la russe ====
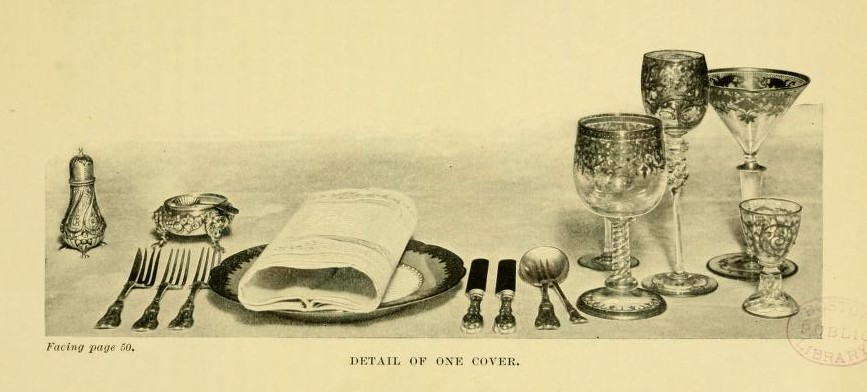
Cover (place setting) for a formal or semi-formal dinner of 6 courses served à la russe: oysters, soup, fish, entrée, roast, and dessert. The entrée served in this meal does not require a knife and is eaten with a fork only. Dessert flatware is brought to the table with the dessert plate. For a meal with more courses, additional flatware would be brought to the table at the time the dish is served. (Lida Seely. Mrs. Seely’s Cook Book, 1902.)

The details of presentation and table setting in service à la russe are variously described by culinary writers from the late 19th to the 20th centuries, including Urbain Dubois and Émile Bernard, Charles Pierce, S. O. Johnson (‘Daisy Eyebright’), Mrs. Van Koert Schuyler, Lida Seely, Emily Post, and Amy Vanderbilt.

The table is set with candles, flowers, and cold foods. In the late 19th century, sweet entremets, cakes, pastries, fruit, nuts, and bonbons were typical. In the 20th century, nuts, olives, celery, and radishes, or only nuts, were more common.

The cover (place setting) for each guest is laid with a service plate (also called a place plate), napkin, flatware, and stemware. The cover may also include a roll or other piece of bread, a place card, and a menu. Salt cellars and pepper pots are placed between guests.

Forks are laid to the left of the service plate and knives to the right, placed in the order they will be used, going from the outermost fork and knife to the innermost. A tablespoon for the soup is laid to the right of the knives, and a small fork for oysters or other cold hors d’œuvres is laid to the right of the spoon. No more than three forks and three knives are laid with the cover (apart from the oyster fork), enough to accommodate the first three courses after the soup (typically fish, entrée, and roast; or fish, roast, and vegetable entremets). If there are more courses, additional flatware is brought to the table at the time the course is served.

Seely notes that service plates are not always used in British table service. Culinary writers generally agree that the flatware for the cover is limited to three forks and three knives, but Schuyler states that the table can be set with all the flatware needed for the meal, a practice Post criticizes.

=== Other styles of presentation ===
Compromise Service is characterized by serving each course separately, as in service à la russe; but the soup, roasts, and some other dishes are placed on the table in their turn to be ladled out or carved and apportioned by the hostess or host, similar to service à la française.

Silver service is a style of service à la russe in which the servants, not the guests, serve the food from the platter, moving the food to each guest’s plate with a fork and spoon held in one hand like tongs.

Service à l’assiette (service au guéridon, direct Service, banquet service, restaurant service) is a style of service in which the food is apportioned onto individual plates at the sideboard or in the kitchen, and the servants set the filled plates in front of each guest. This type of service is characteristic of restaurant service. In France, service à l’assiette is particularly associated with service au gueridon, where plates are prepared by the waiters on a moveable table, and with late-20th-century nouvelle cuisine, where plates are given an elaborate presentation in the kitchen.

== Notes, references, and sources ==
=== Sources ===
- Brisse, Baron (1867). Le Calendrier gastronomique pour l'année 1867. Paris: Bureau de ‘’La Liberté’’.
- Diat, Louis (1953). "Menu Classique". Gourmet. 13 (10).
- Dubois, Urbain; Bernard, Émile (1856). La Cuisine Classique. Paris: Chez les auteurs.
- Fields, Alonzo (1960). My 21 Years in the White House. New York: Coward-McCann, Inc.
- Filippini, Alessandro (1889). The Table: How to Buy Food, How to Cook It, How to Serve It. New York: Charles L. Webster & Company.
- Flanders, Judith (2003). The Victorian House: Domestic Life from Childbirth to Deathbed. London: Harper Perennial. ISBN 0007131895.
- Flandrin, Jean-Louis (2007) [2001]. Arranging the Meal: A History of Table Service in France [L’Ordre des mets]. Translated by Julie E. Johnson. Berkeley: University of California Press. ISBN 978-0520238855.
- Gouffé, Jules (1867). Le Livre de cuisine. Paris: L. Hachette et Cie.
- Henderson, Mary F. (1876). Practical Cooking and Dinner Giving. New York: Harper & Brothers.
- Johnson, S. O. (1873). A Manual of Etiquette. Philadelphia: David McKay.
- Leospo, Louis (1918). Traité d’industrie hotelière. Paris-Nice: L. Andrau.
- Manuel de Gastronomie. Paris: Levrault. 1825.
- Pierce, Charles (1857). The Household Manager. London: George Routledge & Co.
- Post, Emily (1922). Etiquette in Society, in Business, in Politics, and at Home. New York: Funk & Wagnalls Company.
- Post, Emily (1945). Etiquette: The Blue Book of Social Usage, new edition. New York: Funk & Wagnalls Company.
- Ranhofer, Charles (1894). The Epicurean. New York: Charles Ranhofer.
- Schuyler, Mrs. Van Koert (1893). "Correct Service at Table". The Ladies' Home Journal. 10 (2): 26.
- Seely, Lida (1902). Mrs. Seely's Cook Book. New York: The Macmillan Company.
- Senn, C. Herman (1892). Practical Gastronomy and Culinary Dictionary. London: Spottiswoode & Co.
- The Servants Practical Guide. London: Frederick Warne and Co. 1880.
- "Service à la russe". Dictionnaire des cultures gastronomiques (2 ed.). Paris: Presses Universitaires de France. 2018. p. 1340.
- Smith, Marie (1967). Entertaining in the White House. Washington, DC: Acropolis Books.
- Strong, Roy (2002). Feast: A History of Grand Eating. London: Jonathan Cape. ISBN 978-0151007585.
- Vanderbilt, Amy (1952). Amy Vanderbilt's Complete Book of Etiquette. Garden City, New York: Doubleday & Company, Inc.

== See also ==
- Table d'hôte
- Kaiseki
- Italian meal structure
- Hanjeongsik
