= Course (food) =

Set of foods served together during a meal

A course is a group of dishes served together during a meal.

A course may include many different dishes served at the same time, as in Service à la française (lit. 'Service in the French style'). The first "course", for example, could include potages, hors d’œuvres, and entrées all set out together. Meals served à la française can include from one to five courses, depending on the way the stages of the meal are grouped together. Beginning in the early 19th century, meals of three courses were the most common arrangement in service à la française.

In contrast, a course may include individual dishes brought to the table sequentially and served separately to each guest, as in Service à la russe (lit. 'Service in the Russian style'). For example, a meal could have a first course of potage, a second course or a third course of entrées, and so on. The number of courses in meals served à la russe has changed over time, but an underlying sequence of dishes—based on the stages of the meal in the older service à la française—persisted from the 19th century to World War II and continued for formal meals in a much-reduced form into the 21st century.

== Etymology ==
The word "course" is derived from the French word cours (run), which came into English in the 14th century. It may have come into use because the food for a banquet had to be brought at speed from a remote kitchen. In the 1420 cookbook Du fait de cuisine, the word "course" is used interchangeably with the word for serving.

== References and sources ==
=== Sources ===
Flandrin, Jean-Louis (2007) [2001]. Arranging the Meal: A History of Table Service in France [L’Ordre des mets]. Translated by Julie E. Johnson. Berkeley: University of California Press. ISBN 978-0520238855.

Flanders, Judith (2003). The Victorian House: Domestic Life from Childbirth to Deathbed. New York: HarperCollins. ISBN 0007131895.

Manuel de Gastronomie. Paris: Levrault. 1825.

Morton, Mark (2004). Cupboard Love 2: A Dictionary of Culinary Curiosities. Toronto: Insomniac Press. ISBN 978-1897415931.

Scully, Terence (1995). The Art of Cookery in the Middle Ages. Woodbridge: Boydell Press. ISBN 978-0851154305.

Strong, Roy (2002). Feast: A History of Grand Eating. London: Jonathan Cape. ISBN 978-0151007585.

== See also ==
- Cookbook
- Culinary arts
- Full course dinner
- hRecipe – a microformat for marking-up recipes in web pages
- Italian meal structure
- List of desserts
- Lists of foods
- Main course
- Recipe
- Sadhya
