= Main course =

Phase of a meal

A main course is the featured or primary dish in a meal consisting of several courses. The nature of what qualifies as a main course, and how and when it is served, varies cross-culturally. In the "Classical Order" of service à la française, the main course generally follows the entrée (lit. 'entry') course.

== History ==
For the Romans, the main course was the mensa prima, preceded by a starter gustatio and followed by the dessert mensa secunda. A three course meal is also attributed to Ziryab in 9th century Al-Andalus.

In 17th century service à la française, food was loaded onto the table and people served themselves. This buffet-like service was replaced by service à la russe which used waiters.

== Usage ==
In the United States and some parts of Canada the main course is traditionally called an "entrée". The modern French use of the term entrée refers to a dish served before the main course.

According to linguist Dan Jurafsky, North American usage ("entrée") comes from the original French meaning of the first of many meat courses. The first written use of the term 'entree' was in Petit traicté, which was published by Pierre Sargent in Paris between 1534 and 1536. In this book, the first course of the whole meal was named 'entree de table'.

== See also ==
- Full course dinner

== Bibliography ==
- Vergé, Roger (1996). The Main Course. Weidenfeld & Nicolson. ISBN 0-297-83638-2.
