= Service à la russe =

Type of formal dining

Service à la russe (French: [sɛʁvis a la ʁys]; 'service in the Russian style', Russian: русская сервировка) is a style of serving food in which dishes are brought to the table sequentially and served separately to each guest. Service à la russe was developed in France in the 19th century by adapting traditional Russian table service to existing French gastronomic principles. The new service slowly displaced the older service à la française ('service in the French style'), in which a variety of dishes are placed on the table in an impressive display of tureens, platters, and other serving dishes.

In service à la russe, each dish is arranged in the kitchen and immediately brought to the table, where guests choose what they want from each platter as it is presented to them. In service à la française, many platters are placed together on the table, where the dishes often grow cold and lose their freshness before the guests can eat them; and in practice, guests can choose from only a few of the dishes on the table. Service à la russe, which includes only flowers and cold dishes on the table, is less magnificent than service à la française, with its elaborate display of many dishes. Service à la russe also reduces the time spent at the table.

== Early descriptions of Russian table service ==
In 1553, Richard Chancellor, the first Englishman to visit Moscow, recorded his impressions of an elaborate banquet at the court of Tsar Ivan the Terrible. Chancellor described the Russian practice of serving the dishes of the meal in succession, with individual plates prepared and presented to each guest.

Later writers in the 17th century, including Adam Olearius and Grigory Kotoshikhin, describe serving the bowls or platters (Note: German: Schüsseln, "bowls"; Russian: блюда, "platters". The word блюдo, often translated "dish"’, means a "large plate" or "platter", and by metonymy, can also refer to the food that the platter contains. (Slovar' 1985, p. 71)) in succession, but they describe them as being set on the table for guests to help themselves to the food. The early-18th-century Honorable Mirror for Youth implies a similar arrangement.

Also in the 18th century, Johann-Georg Korb describes a variety of dishes with no mention of table service. Just Juel and Friedrich Christian Weber describe a variety of dishes presented in several courses, also with no discussion of table service—a first course of cold, salted and pickled food set out in abundance on the table (an early version of zakuski); a second course of hot soups, roasts, and other hot dishes; and a third course of sweets. That arrangement derives from the reforms of Peter the Great and differs from the practices described in older accounts.

In the late 18th and early 19th centuries, Denis Fonvizin and Marie-Antoine Carême, both writing in France, compare Russian and French table service. Fonvizin prefers the Russian style of presenting the food sequentially, but Carême prefers the French style of arranging a variety of dishes on the table.

== Development of service à la russe in France and England ==
Alternatives to a strict observance of service à la française were already evident in France in the early 19th century without direct reliance on Russian table practices.

As early as 1804, Grimod de La Reynière roundly criticizes the display of many dishes on the table, encouraging instead serving dishes in succession.

Later authors, including Carême, Élisabeth-Félicie Bayle-Mouillard ("Mme Celnart"), Bernardi, Urbain Dubois and Émile Bernard, and Isabella Beeton, recommend presenting certain dishes as assiettes volantes ("flying plates") (Note: Before the 19th century, the term assiettes volantes referred to plates placed on the table between the platters. (Guyot et al. 1768, p. 176) In the 18th century, the term referred to dishes presented directly to each guest and not placed on the table.) for foods that must be served "straight from the oven", like soufflés, fritters, beignets, and various pastries. Celnart also writes that at large dinners, the soup tureen and large joints are not set on the table, but instead are placed on a sideboard where the servants portion the soup and carve the joints and serve them individually to the guests. That sort of presentation was unknown in the 18th century and earlier.

In 1810, the first dinners à la russe were served in France by Russian Ambassador Alexander Kurakin at his residence in Clichy. All of Paris was abuzz with the novelty. Others claim that service à la russe was introduced to France and England at the Peace of 1814, as a compliment to the Tsar of Russia. By 1829, “the style termed à la Russe” was already popular among some noblemen. Even so, the transition from service à la française to service à la russe took place over decades, and the differences between the two services were not always clear.

By the 1850s and '60s, culinary writers, including Dubois and Bernard, Charles Pierce, Isabella Beeton, and Jules Gouffé, began to describe the distinctions between the two services in detail, and they wrote that both were commonly used and that each had supporters and detractors. The principal difference between the styles is the presentation of the food, not the sequence of dishes, which in both styles is the "Classical Order" used in service à la française since the early 17th century.

== Courses in a dinner served à la russe ==
The details of the courses (Note: The "courses" in service à la française are the various presentations of multiple dishes on the table. The first "course", for example, could include potages, hors d’œuvre, and entrées all set out together. In contrast, the "courses" in service à la russe refer to each stage of the meal served in succession. For example, a meal could have a course of potages, a separate course of hors d’œuvre, a separate course of entrées, and so on.) in a dinner à la russe are variously described by prominent culinary writers from the late 19th and 20th centuries, including Dubois and Bernard, Charles Pierce, Baron Brisse, S. O. Johnson (‘Daisy Eyebright’), Sarah Tyson Rorer, C. Herman Senn, Mrs. Van Koert Schuyler, Charles Ranhofer, Oscar Tschirky Lida Seely, Emily Post, Prosper Montagné, and Amy Vanderbilt.

The number of courses has changed over time, but an underlying sequence of dishes—potage (soup), entrée (including hors d’œuvres and relevés), roast, entremets (savory and sweet), and dessert—persisted from the 19th century to World War II and continued for formal meals in a much-reduced form into the 21st century. The sequence of dishes descends directly from the much older service à la française. The growing popularity of service à la russe, though, led to some changes in the sequence of dishes.

In some styles of service, oysters or cold hors d’œuvres were served before the potages. Hot hors d’œuvres might also be served after the potages, but they were increasingly omitted from dinner menus in the 20th century. (Note: The meaning of “hors d’œuvres” has changed over time, from undefined extra dishes in the 16th century, to small extra entrées and entremets in the early 18th century, to a distinct stage of the meal between the soup and entrées in the late 18th and 19th centuries, to a cold first course in the late 19th century, to a small plate of celery, olives, radishes, and nuts in the 20th century. (Flandrin 2007, pp. 99–101))

Beginning in the early 19th-century, fish was a common relevé in service à la française. In the later 19th century service à la russe, fish was often the only relevé, served as a distinct “fish course”.

The coup du milieu, a glass of frozen punch taken at the midpoint of the meal, was introduced in the early 19th century and remained popular in service à la russe.

By the late 19th century, vegetable entremets (entremets de legumes) had largely ceased to be a separate course. They often appeared on menus as if they were, but they were served as accompaniments to the various meat or fish courses. Only certain vegetables continued to be served separately after the roast, such as salads, asparagus, sweet corn, cauliflower, artichokes, and fresh tomatoes.

By the mid-20th century, the dessert course, which formerly included only foods from the storeroom (de l'office), came to include dishes that were formerly served as sweet entremets. In the United States, dessert came to include only ices, ice cream, and other chilled or frozen sweets, and fruit came to be served in a distinct course of its own.

In French-style meals, cheese is served before the sweet entremets or fruit. In English-style meals, cheese or a “savoury” (a salty or piquant sort of hors d’œuvres, often made with cheese, eggs, or smoked fish) is served after the fruit. Escoffier considered the savoury to be a gastronomic absurdity.

Menus of the 19th and early 20th centuries typically include at least potage, fish or other relevé, entrée, roast, vegetable entremets, and sweet entremets, as in the six-course menus of the prominent mid-19th-century culinary writer Baron Brisse. Brisse and some other writers do not include dessert (fruit, dairy dishes, and ices) on their menus, but dessert is always assumed to be the last course.

Other 19th-century writers typically recommend more courses, including oysters or a cold hors d’œuvres before the potage, a hot hors d’œuvres after the potage, punch at the mid-point of the meal, a separate game course, and cheese or savouries before or after the dessert.

By offering multiple entrées, relevés, and roasts, menus could grow to a dozen courses or more. Charles Ranhofer outlines in detail the dishes necessary for restaurant dinners ranging from five to fourteen courses. His five-course dinner includes soup, fish, a choice of two entrées, one roast with a salad, and dessert. Longer dinners are created by adding to the menu ever more hors d’œuvres (which Ranhofer calls “side dishes”), relevés, entrées, frozen punch, cold dishes, and hot and cold sweet entremets. Ranhofer also gives extensive instructions for serving wines.

Emily Post, arguably the most influential 20th-century writer on American social customs, recommends in her early books menus of seven courses—cold hors-d’œuvres, soup, fish, entrée, roast, salad, and dessert, followed by after-dinner coffee. “The menu for an informal dinner would leave out the entrée, and possibly either the hors-d’oeuvre or the soup.”

Post writes disparagingly of the lengthy dinners of the previous century.

As a matter of fact, the marked shortening of the menu is in informal dinners and at the home table of the well-to-do. Formal dinners have been as short as the above schedule for twenty-five years. [c. 1900.] A dinner interlarded with a row of extra entrées, Roman punch, and hot dessert is unknown except at a public dinner, or in the dining-room of a parvenu. About thirty-five years ago [c.1890] such dinners are said to have been in fashion!

After the 1920s, dinners were further curtailed. As Post writes in the 1945 edition of her book, the shorter "informal" meal of five courses and after-dinner coffee in the first edition of her book had become the norm for formal dinners at private homes—soup or oysters or melon or clams; fish or entrée; roast; salad; and dessert; followed by after-dinner coffee in the library or drawing room. Wine service could include a separate wine for each course, or champagne could be the only wine after the sherry served with the soup.

In the 1960s, Jackie Kennedy reduced the menus at White House dinners from the seven courses typical of mid-century formal occasions to a mere four courses—fish, meat, salad, and dessert or, on lean days, (Note: In accordance with church regulations in force from the Middle Ages to the 19th century, the ingredients for every stage of the meal varied between "meat days" (jours gras, literally "fat days"), when all foods were allowed, and "lean days" (jours maigres), when the church forbade consumption of meat and fowl but not fish. Until the 16th century, white meats (milk, cream, butter, and cheese) and eggs were additionally forbidden in Lent. Beginning in the 17th century, white meats were allowed in Lent. Beginning in the 19th century, eggs were also allowed in Lent.) soup, fish, salad, and dessert. Dinners of only four courses were not new, but Kennedy’s influence set the style for White House state dinners and other formal dinners through the end of the 20th century.

== Presentation and table setting ==
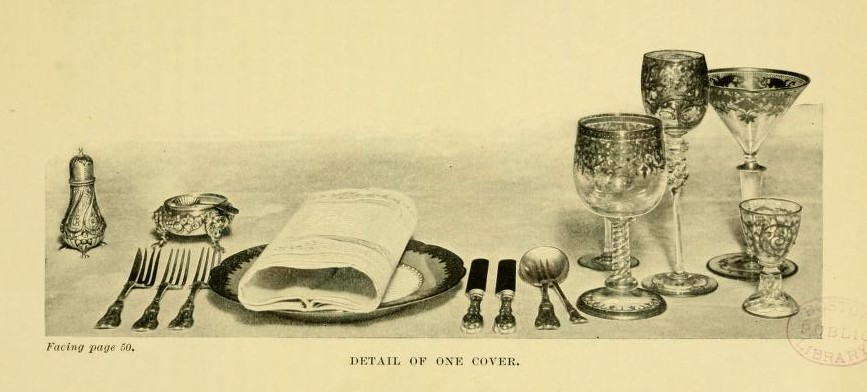
Cover (place setting) for a formal or semi-formal dinner of 6 courses served à la russe: oysters, soup, fish, entrée, roast, and dessert. The entrée served in this meal does not require a knife and is eaten with a fork only. Dessert flatware is brought to the table with the dessert plate. For a meal with more courses, additional flatware would be brought to the table at the time the dish is served. (Lida Seely. Mrs. Seely’s Cook Book, 1902.)

The details of presentation and table setting in service à la russe are variously described by culinary writers from the late 19th to the early 20th centuries, including Dubois and Bernard, Pierce, Johnson, Schuyler, Seely, Post, and Vanderbilt.

The table is set with candles, flowers, and cold foods. In the late 19th century, sweet entremets, cakes, pastries, fruit, nuts, and bonbons were typical. In the 20th century, nuts, olives, celery, and radishes, or only nuts, were more common.

The cover (place setting) for each guest is laid with a service plate (also called a place plate), napkin, flatware, and stemware. The cover may also include a roll or other piece of bread, a place card, and a menu. Salt cellars and pepper pots are placed between guests.

Forks are laid to the left of the service plate and knives to the right, placed in the order they will be used, going from the outermost fork and knife to the innermost. A tablespoon for the soup is laid to the right of the knives, and a small fork for oysters or other cold hors d’œuvres is laid to the right of the spoon. No more than three forks and three knives are laid with the cover (apart from the oyster fork), enough to accommodate the first three courses after the soup (typically fish, entrée, and roast; or fish, roast, and vegetable entremets). If there are more courses, additional flatware is brought to the table at the time the course is served.

If the first course is oysters or a cold hors d’œuvres, it is typically prepared on separate plates that are placed on the service plates. Johnson and Schuyler suggest placing the first course on the table before the guests enter the dining room; Post considers the practice old-fashioned. After the hors d’œuvres are consumed, the servants remove the soiled plates and any glasses associated with the course, leaving the service plates on the table.

The soup is apportioned by the servants at a side table or in the pantry or kitchen. The servants set the plates of soup on the service plates. After the soup is consumed, the soup plate and service plate are removed together with the sherry glass.

A clean plate is laid for the next and each subsequent course. For each course, the servants present platters to the guests, who serve themselves from the dish. Foods that are easily portioned or divided, like entrées and entremets, are presented as they come from the kitchen. Large joints, like relevés and roasts, are carved at the sideboard or in the kitchen and arranged on the platters before the servants present them to the guests. Servants may also present vegetables, sauces, and condiments to accompany the course being served. Servants remove the soiled plates, flatware, and glasses after each course and lay a clean plate for the next course.

The table is cleared before the dessert course, leaving only the water and wine glasses needed for dessert. The servants place a dessert plate in front of each guest with the dessert fork and spoon on the plate, and the guests move their own flatware to the sides of the dessert plate.

If a fruit course follows, the servants remove the dessert plates and flatware and place a fruit plate in front of each guest, arranged with a fruit fork and knife on the plate, as in the dessert course.

If finger bowls are used, they are typically placed on the dessert plate (or the fruit plate, if fruit is the last course) with the flatware on either side of the bowl. The bowls are sometimes set on a cloth doily (never paper) or an underplate. The guests move the finger bowl with the doily or underplate to the upper left of the dessert plate and move the flatware to the sides of the plate in the usual way. After dessert (or after the fruit, if that forms the last course), guests lightly dip their fingertips into the water, one hand at a time, and then wipe them on the napkin in their laps.

The guests usually leave the table after dessert or fruit and take coffee and liqueurs in another room, but they are sometimes served at the table. The English and American custom is for women to go to another room and leave the men at the table or in a separate room to enjoy whisky and cigars.

=== Variations in presentation ===
Seely notes that service plates are not always used in British table service. Culinary writers generally agree that the flatware for the cover is limited to three forks and three knives, but Schuyler states that the table can be set with all the flatware needed for the meal, a practice Post criticizes.

A first course of cold hors d’œuvres is typically prepared on separate plates that are placed on the service plates, but it can be presented on a platter for guests to serve themselves. In that style of service, the guests must use the service plate for their portion, and the servants must then remove the soiled service plates and replace them with clean plates, often called "exchange plates", for the soup course.

The entrée can also be prepared on separate plates instead of being presented on a platter. In that style of service, an exchange plate first takes the place of the soup plate and service plate; but the servants must then remove the clean exchange plate when they set down the entrée, since only the cold hors d’œuvres and the soup plate are placed on the service plate.

Dinners in the American style sometimes include a salad as the first course before or instead of soup, an innovation that appeared before World War I and became popular in the 1950s. Escoffier and Louis Diat disapprove of the practice. Vanderbilt notes that first-course salads were popular in California, but none of her menus include them as a first course.

The soup and fish courses often include a choice between two soups (usually clear or cream) and two or three fish (usually poached, broiled, or fried). Other courses are presented sequentially, not as a choice, but guests can refuse any dish.

In some styles of service, salad plates for the roast course are placed to the left of the dinner plate when the roast is served. Special crescent-shaped salad plates are sometimes used for that purpose. Post disapproves of the practice.

At informal luncheons and dinners, the dessert fork and spoon may be set at the top of the plate throughout the meal. When the waiters set down the dessert plates, the guests move their own flatware to either side of the plate. That arrangement is not used at formal meals.

In presenting most dishes, the platters include a large spoon and fork for lifting the food. Guests place the spoon under their portion and use the fork to steady the food as they lift it and move it to their plate. Vegetables and some other dishes include only a spoon.

=== Compromise Service, Mixed Service ===
Compromise Service is characterized by serving each course separately, as in service à la russe; but the soup, roasts, and some other dishes are placed on the table in their turn to be ladled out or carved and apportioned by the hostess or host, similar to service à la française. In general, after each plate is filled, a servant takes it and sets it in front of each guest.

=== Service à l’anglaise, Service à la pince, "Silver Service" ===
The term service à l'anglaise has historically been used in different ways.

In the mid- to late-19th century, service à l’anglaise or "English Service" described a regional variation of service à la française, differing somewhat in its selection of dishes and in the arrangement of the tureens and platters on the table.

By the early 20th century, though, the term had come to refer to a style of service à la russe in which the servants, not the guests, serve the food from the platter, moving the food to each guest’s plate with a fork and spoon held in one hand like tongs. In England, this style of service is generally called "silver service".

=== Service à l’assiette, Service au guéridon, Direct Service, Banquet service, Restaurant service ===
Service à l’assiette is a style of service in which the food is apportioned onto individual plates at the sideboard or in the kitchen, and the servants set the filled plates in front of each guest.

A dinner served à la russe often includes some dishes served à l’assiette, particularly oysters, cold hors d’œuvres, and soup at the beginning of the meal. The rest of the dishes are presented on a platter in the usual way.

In restaurant service, service à l’assiette is common for every course. Plates are prepared in the kitchen and the waiters place them in front of each guest. In France, service à l’assiette is particularly associated with service au guéridon, where plates are prepared by the waiters on a moveable table, and with late-20th-century nouvelle cuisine, where plates are given an elaborate presentation in the kitchen. In the early 20th century, some restaurateurs confusingly called this style service à la russe to the exclusion of the older style of serving the courses on platters.

In the late 20th century, tasting menus, the service of many small dishes in succession, became popular in many restaurants. The dishes are served à l’assiette, but the meal is not arranged according the principals of Classical Service.

== Notes, references, and sources ==
=== Sources ===
- Bayle-Mouillard, Élisabeth-Félicie (1839). Nouveau manuel complet de la bonne compagnie. Paris: Roret Libraire.
- Beeton, Isabella (1861). Household Management. London: S. O. Beeton.
- Bernardi (1845). L'Écuyer trenchant ou l'art de découper et servir à table. Paris: Gustave Barba.
- Brisse, Baron (1867). Le Calendrier gastronomique pour l'année 1867. Paris: Bureau de ‘’La Liberté’’.
- Carême, Marie-Antoine (1822). Le Maître d'hôtel français. Vol. 1. Paris: Firmin Didot.
- Carême, Marie-Antoine (1822). Le Maître d'hôtel français. Vol. 2. Paris: Firmin Didot.
- Diat, Louis (1953). "Menu Classique". Gourmet. 13 (10).
- Dubois, Urbain; Bernard, Émile (1856). La Cuisine Classique. Paris: Chez les auteurs.
- Escoffier, Auguste (1912). Le Livre des menus. Paris: E. Grevin.
- Fields, Alonzo (1960). My 21 Years in the White House. New York: Coward-McCann, Inc.
- Filippini, Alessandro (1889). The Table: How to Buy Food, How to Cook It, How to Serve It. New York: Charles L. Webster & Company.
- Flanders, Judith (2003). The Victorian House: Domestic Life from Childbirth to Deathbed. London: Harper Perennial. ISBN 0007131895.
- Flandrin, Jean-Louis (2007) [2001]. Arranging the Meal: A History of Table Service in France [L’Ordre des mets]. Translated by Johnson, Julie E. Berkeley: University of California Press. ISBN 978-0520238855.
- Fonvizin, Denis (1959). Sobraniye sochineniy Собрание сочинений [Collected Works]. Vol. 2. Moscow: State Publishing House.
- Gisslen, Wayne (2007). Professional Cooking (6 ed.). Hoboken: John Wiley and Sons. ISBN 978-0471663744.
- Goldstein, Darra (2000). "Gastronomic Reforms under Peter the Great: Toward a Cultural History of Russian Food". Jahrbücher für Geschichte Osteuropas. 48 (4): 481–510. JSTOR 41050633.
- Gouffé, Jules (1867). Le Livre de cuisine. Paris: L. Hachette et Cie.
- Grimod de La Reynière, Alexandre-Balthazar-Laurent (1804). Almanach des Gourmands, seconde année. Paris: Maradan.
- Guyot, Pierre-Jean-Jacques-Guillaume; Chamfort, Sébastien-Roch-Nicolas de; Duchemin de la Chênaye (1768). Le Grand vocabulaire françois. Vol. 3. Paris: C. Panckoucke.
- Hakluyt, Richard (1589). The Principall Navigations, Voiages, and Discoveries of the English Nation. London: George Bishop.
- Henderson, Mary F. (1876). Practical Cooking and Dinner Giving. New York: Harper & Brothers.
- Hill, Janet McKenzie (1906). The Up-to-Date Waitress. Boston: Little, Brown, and Company.
- Johnson, S. O. (1873). A Manual of Etiquette. Philadelphia: David McKay.
- Juel, Just (1893) [1709–11]. En Rejse til Rusland under Tsar Peter. Copenhagen: Gyldendalske Boghandels Forlag (F. Hegel & Son).
- Kenney-Herbert, A. (1894). Common-Sense Cookery for English Households. London: Edward Arnold.
- Kollmann, Nancy S. (2008). "Etiquette for Peter's Time: 'The Honorable Mirror for Youth'". Russian History. 35 (1/2): 63–83. doi:10.1163/187633108X00175. JSTOR 24661671.
- Korb, Johann-Georg (1863) [1698]. Diary of an Austrian Secretary of Legation [Diarium itineris in Moscoviam]. Vol. 1. Translated by MacDonnell, Count. London: Bradbury & Evans.
- Kotoshikhin, Grigorii Karpovich (2014) [1666–67]. Poe, Marshall (ed.). Russia in the Reign of Aleksei Mickailovich [О России в царствование Алексея Михайловича]. Translated by Uroff, Benjamin Phillip. Warsaw: De Gruyter Open Ltd. doi:10.2478/9788376560656. ISBN 978-8376560649.
- Leospo, Louis (1918). Traité d’industrie hotelière. Paris-Nice: L. Andrau.
- Masson, Frédéric (1893). "La journée de Napoléon aux Tuileries. III. Le travail. – Le dîner. – La soirée". Revue de famille. 6 (2): 92–113.
- Milon, Marie (1873). Guide pratique, manuel et complet des domestiques (2 ed.). Pernes: by the author.
- Montagné, Prosper (1938). Larousse Gastronomique. Paris: Librairie Larousse.
- Olearius, Adam (1967) [1656]. Travels of Olearius in Seventeenth-Century Russia [Vermehrte Newe Beschreibung der Muscowitischen und Persischen Reyse]. Translated by Baron, Samuel H. Stanford: Stanford University Press.
- Parker, Eliza R. (1885). "Dining Room Talk II: Dinner". Good Housekeeping. 2 (4).
- Pierce, Charles (1857). The Household Manager. London: George Routledge & Co.
- Post, Emily (1922). Etiquette in Society, in Business, in Politics, and at Home. New York: Funk & Wagnalls Company.
- Post, Emily (1945). Etiquette: The Blue Book of Social Usage, new edition. New York: Funk & Wagnalls Company.
- Ranhofer, Charles (1894). The Epicurean. New York: Charles Ranhofer.
- Rorer, Sarah Tyson (1886). Mrs. Rorer's Philadelphia Cookbook. Philadelphia: Arnold and Company.
- Schuyler, Mrs. Van Koert (1893). "Correct Service at Table". The Ladies' Home Journal. 10 (2): 26.
- Seely, Lida (1902). Mrs. Seely's Cook Book. New York: The Macmillan Company.
- Senn, C. Herman (1892). Practical Gastronomy and Culinary Dictionary. London: Spottiswoode & Co.
- The Servants Practical Guide. London: Frederick Warne and Co. 1880.
- "Service à la russe". Dictionnaire des cultures gastronomiques (2 ed.). Paris: Presses Universitaires de France. 2018. p. 1340.
- Slovar' russkogo âzyka XVIII veka Словарь русского языка XVIII века [Russian Dictionary of the 18th Century]. Vol. 2. Leningrad: Nauka Publishing House. 1984.
- Smith, Marie (1967). Entertaining in the White House. Washington, DC: Acropolis Books.
- Tschirky, Oscar (1901). Serving a Course Dinner, by Oscar of the Waldorf-Astoria. New York: Higgins & Seiter.
- Vanderbilt, Amy (1952). Amy Vanderbilt's Complete Book of Etiquette. Garden City, New York: Doubleday & Company, Inc.
- Weber, Friedrich Christian (1721). Das Veränderte Russland. Frankfurt: Nicolaus Förster.

== See also ==
- Degustation
- Full-course dinner
- Boston Cooking-School Cook Book
