= Tureen =

Serving dish for soups and stews

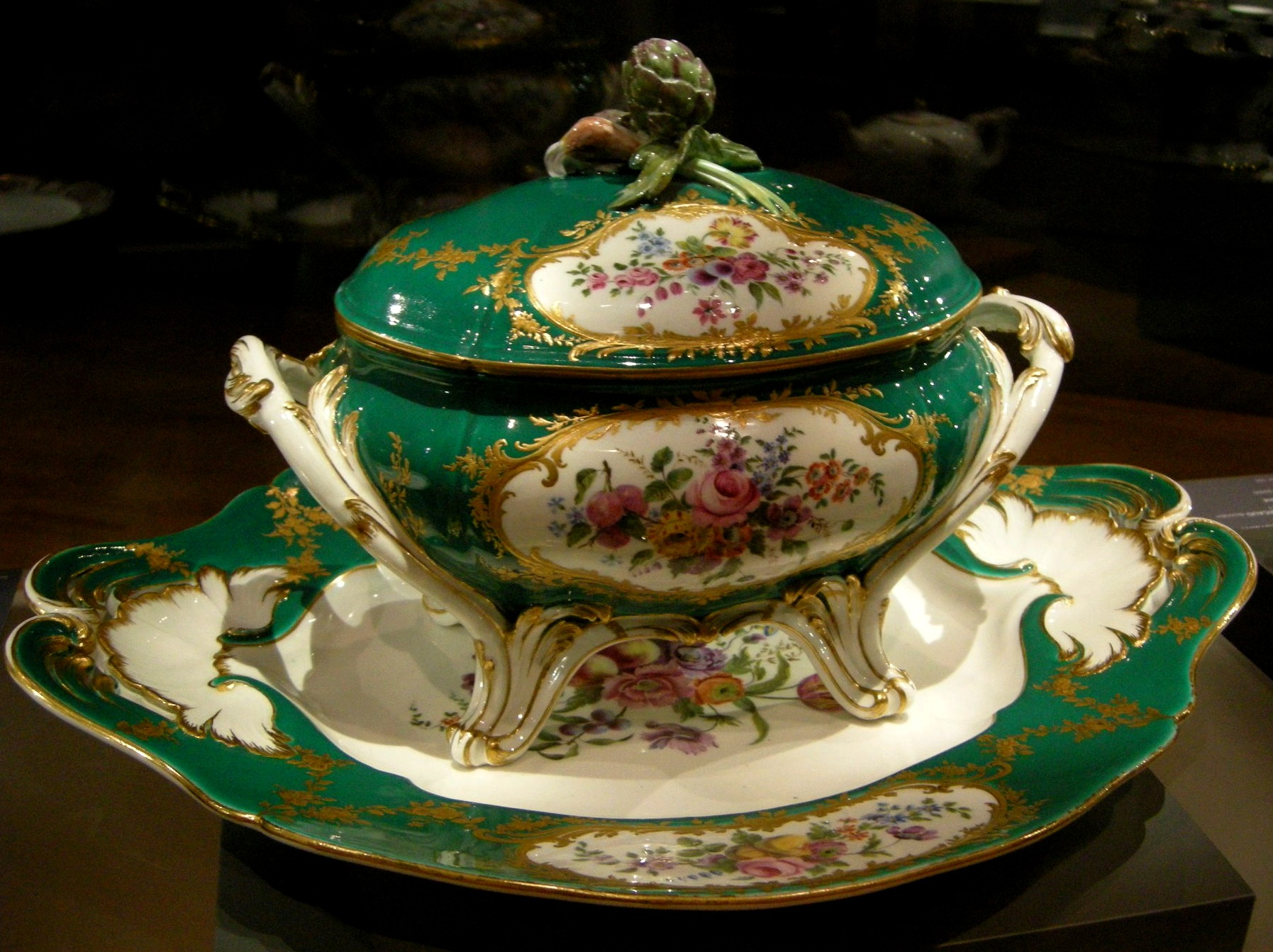
A Sèvres soup tureen and tray. Sèvres porcelain, National Gallery of Victoria, Australia

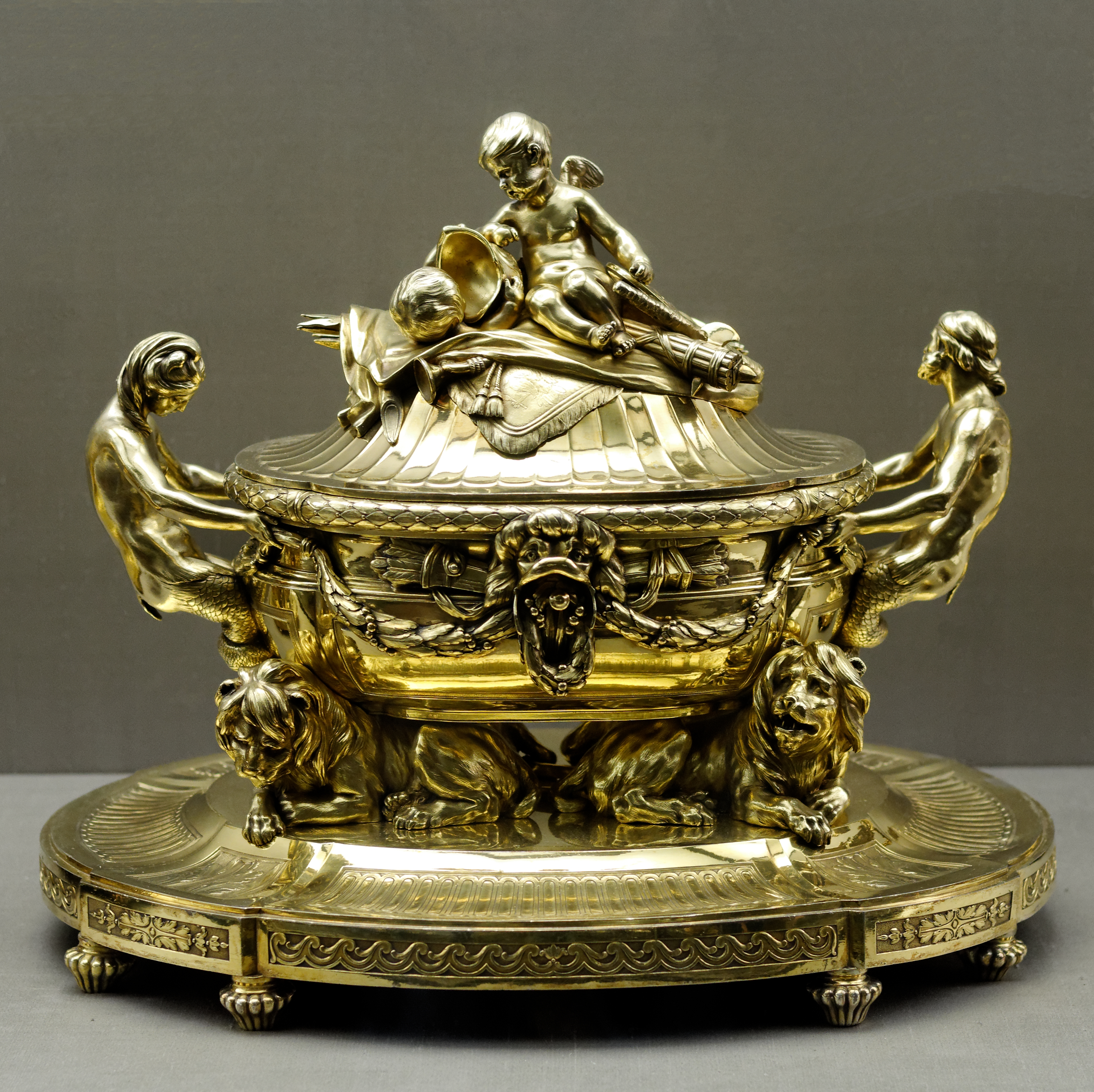
Silver-gilt tureen, Paris, 1769–70

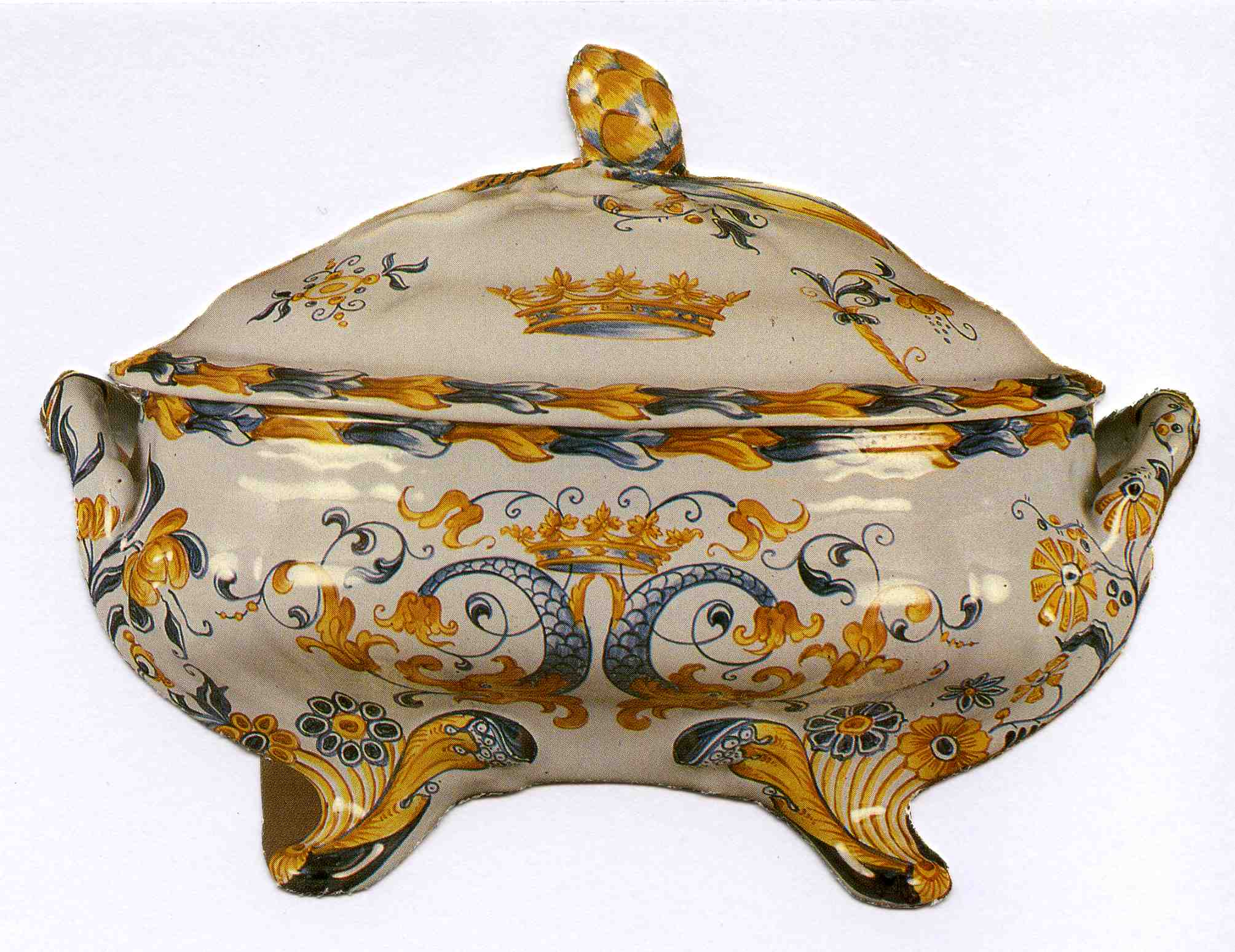
An Émile Gallé (1846–1904) tureen

A tureen is a serving dish for foods such as soups or stews, often shaped as a broad, deep, oval vessel with fixed handles and a low domed cover with a knob or handle. Over the centuries, tureens have appeared in many different forms: round, rectangular, or made into fanciful shapes such as animals or wildfowl. Tureens may be ceramic—either the glazed earthenware called faience, or porcelain—or silver, and customarily they stand on an undertray or platter made en suite. (Note: "as part of a set")

== Etymology ==
Still Life (The Silver Tureen), Chardin, 1728 (Metropolitan Museum of Art)

The tureen as a piece of tableware called a pot à oille—a Catalan-Provençal soup—came into use in late seventeenth-century France. Alternative explanations for the etymology are that it is related to the earlier word terrine, a borrowing from the French for 'a large, circular, earthenware dish' or that it is named to honour the French military hero Marshal Turenne.

== History ==
The tureen's prehistory may be traced to the use of the communal bowl, but during the reign of Louis XIV it was developed from a practical covered serving vessel into one of the most richly ornamented centerpieces of the formal apparatus of dining. This period also saw the old practice of dressing the dinner table with every dish at once (service à la française) superseded by the new practice of separate courses at meal time (service à la russe), each entrée entering from the kitchens with an air of ceremony. Soup remained the first course of most meals, from the king's table to the peasant's, and the soup tureen on its serving platter provided the opening ceremony. Tureens naturally tended towards the impressive; the world's record auction price fetched for a single piece of silver was achieved by a silver tureen made in 1733 by the Parisian silversmith Thomas Germain, sold at Sotheby's New York, 13 November 1996: at US$10,287,500, tripling the former record.

=== Silver tureens ===
Most seventeenth-century French silver tureens were melted down to finance the wars of Louis' late years and may be glimpsed only in paintings. The ornate silver tureens of that period figure in buffets—still life of silver and game—by artists such as Alexandre-François Desportes, or in more modest still life, such as the painting by Jean-Baptiste-Siméon Chardin (illustration), which is dated 1728 but depicts a silver tureen of Baroque form of the first decade of the century.

=== Eighteenth century ===
During the mid-eighteenth century, tureens in appropriate naturalistic shapes, such as tureens in the form of a head of cabbage, were popular. The Chelsea porcelain manufactory produced tureens in the form of rabbits: a Chelsea sale catalogue of 1755 advertised a "Fine tureen in the form of a rabbit as big as life."

== Écuelles and saucières ==
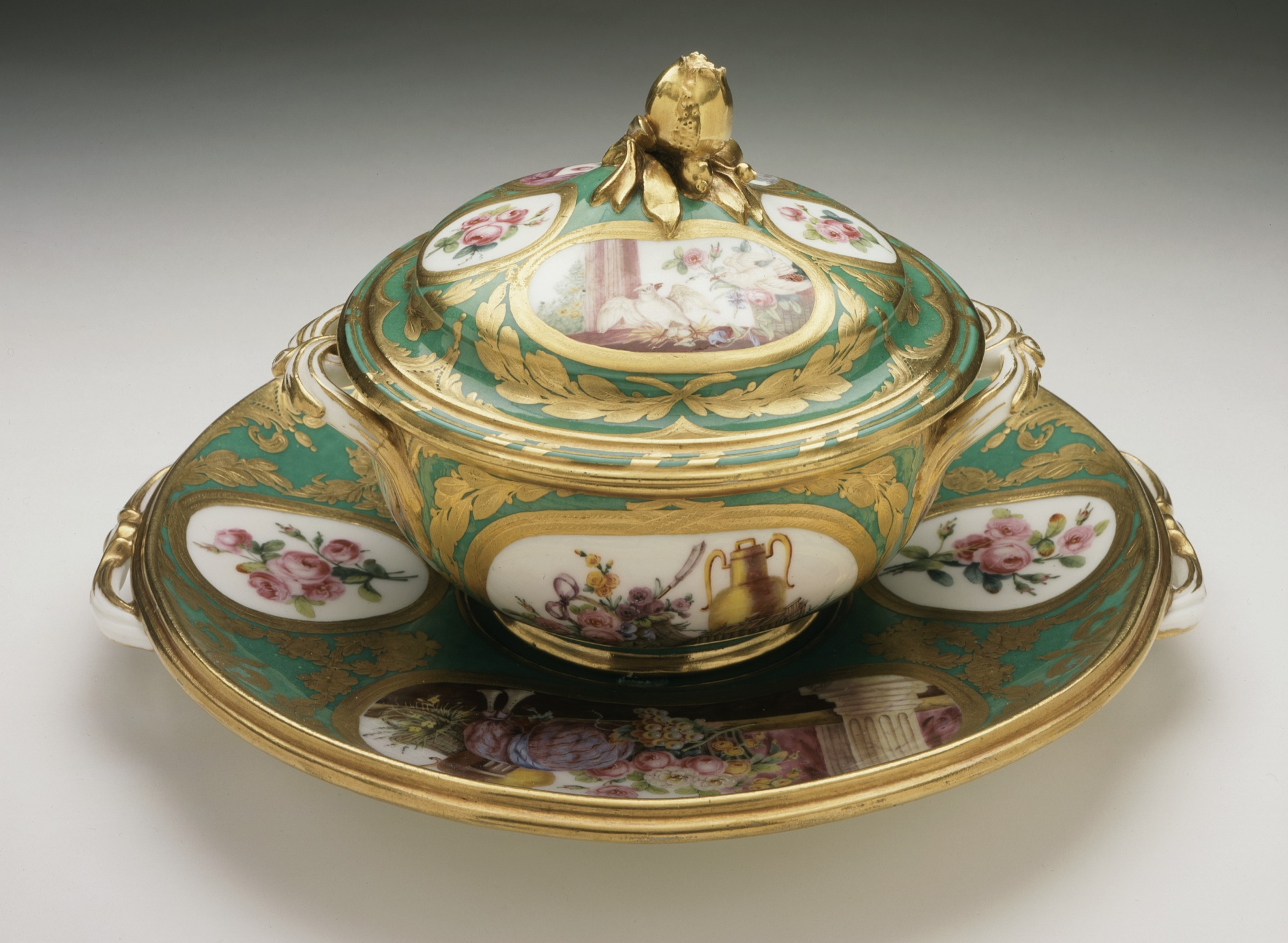
Écuelle and stand, Sèvres porcelain, 1776

Tureens are most practical for serving about six people. In eighteenth-century France, a small individual covered standing bowl on a small platter, essentially an individual tureen, was called an écuelle (also anglicised to ecuelle). It could be lifted by its twin handles and drunk from directly. The shape was used for other purposes; it is often found in toilet services, where its purpose is uncertain. Its modern descendant in tableware is the two-handled cream soup bowl on matching plate. A small covered dish for sauce, called a saucière, could also take the form of a small tureen; it might be integral with its platter (illustration right), for ease in handling and to contain drips.

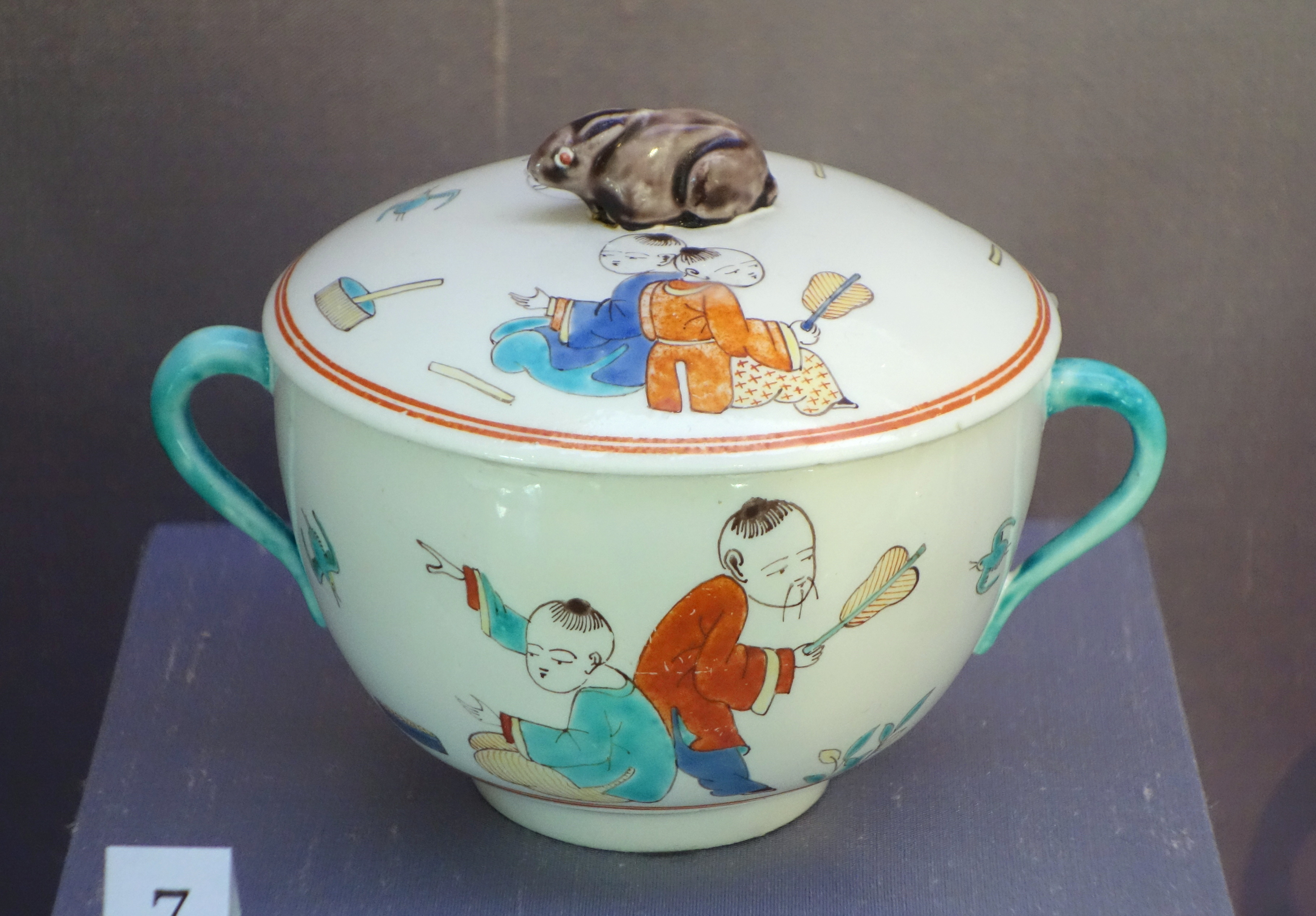
Chinoiserie ecuelle (matching saucer not shown), France, Chantilly porcelain, c. 1735–1740, soft-paste porcelain

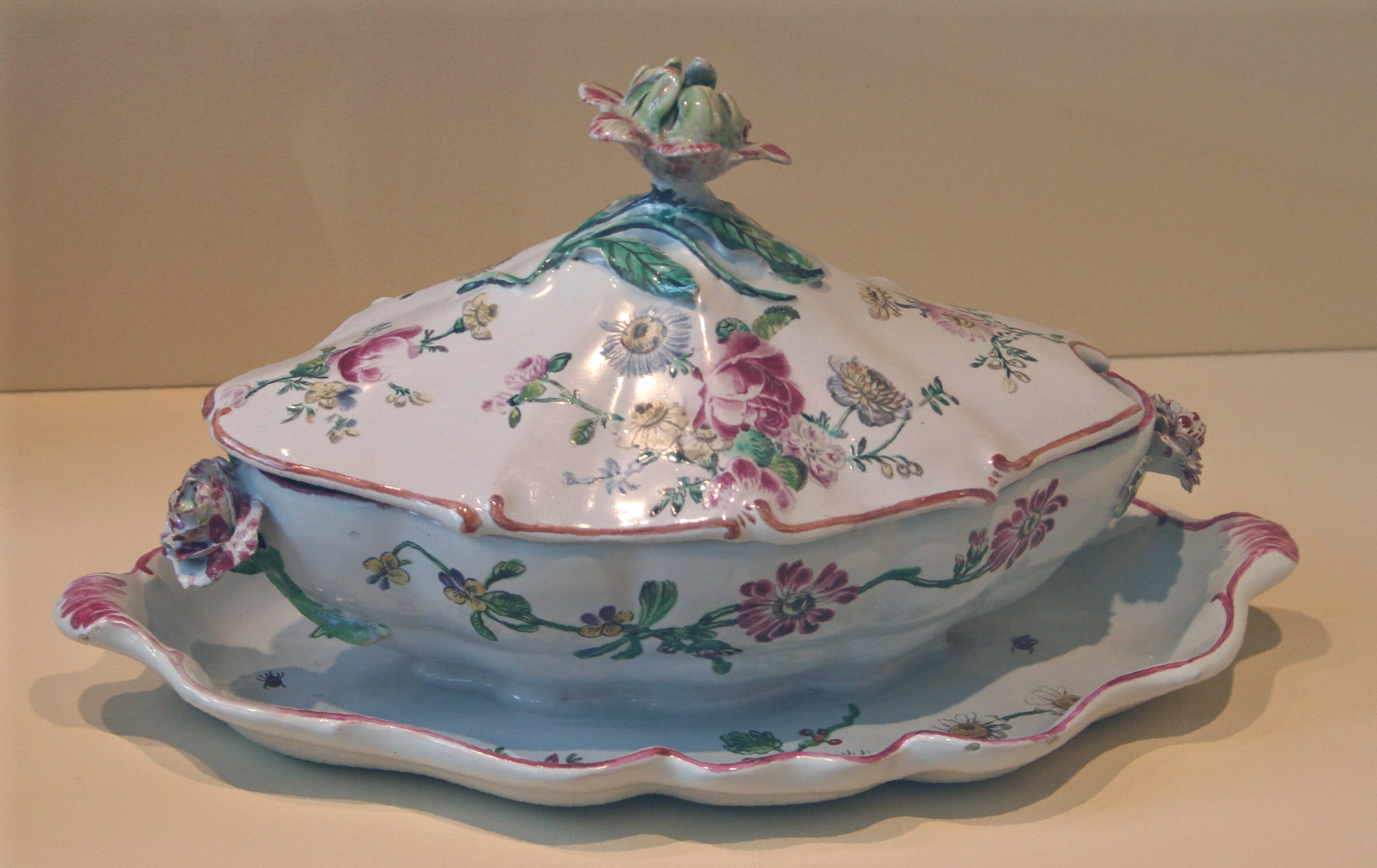
A faience saucière in Rococo taste, factory of the Veuve Perrin, Marseille, c. 1760–80

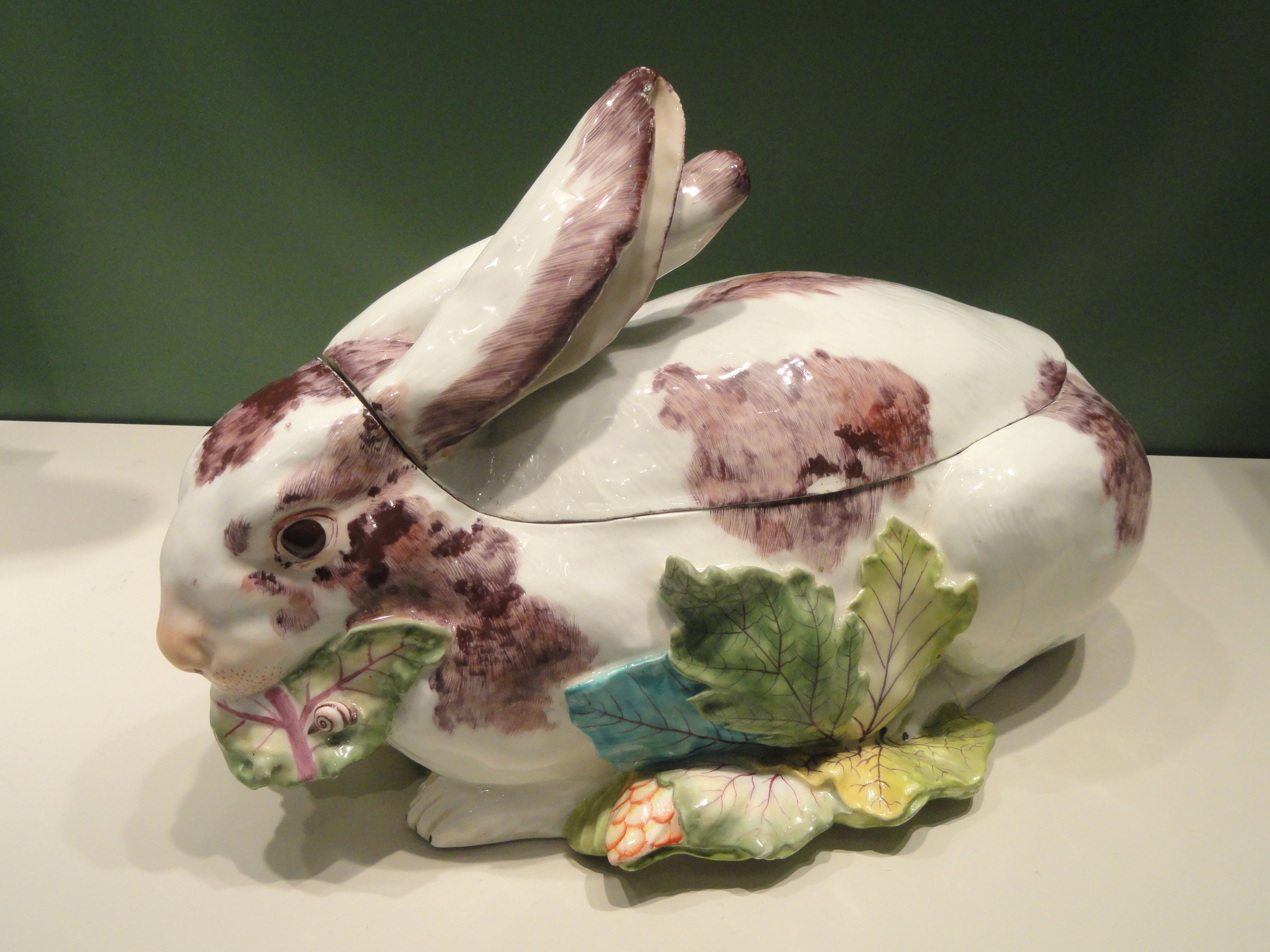
Tureen, depicting a rabbit, Chelsea porcelain, England, porcelain with enamel

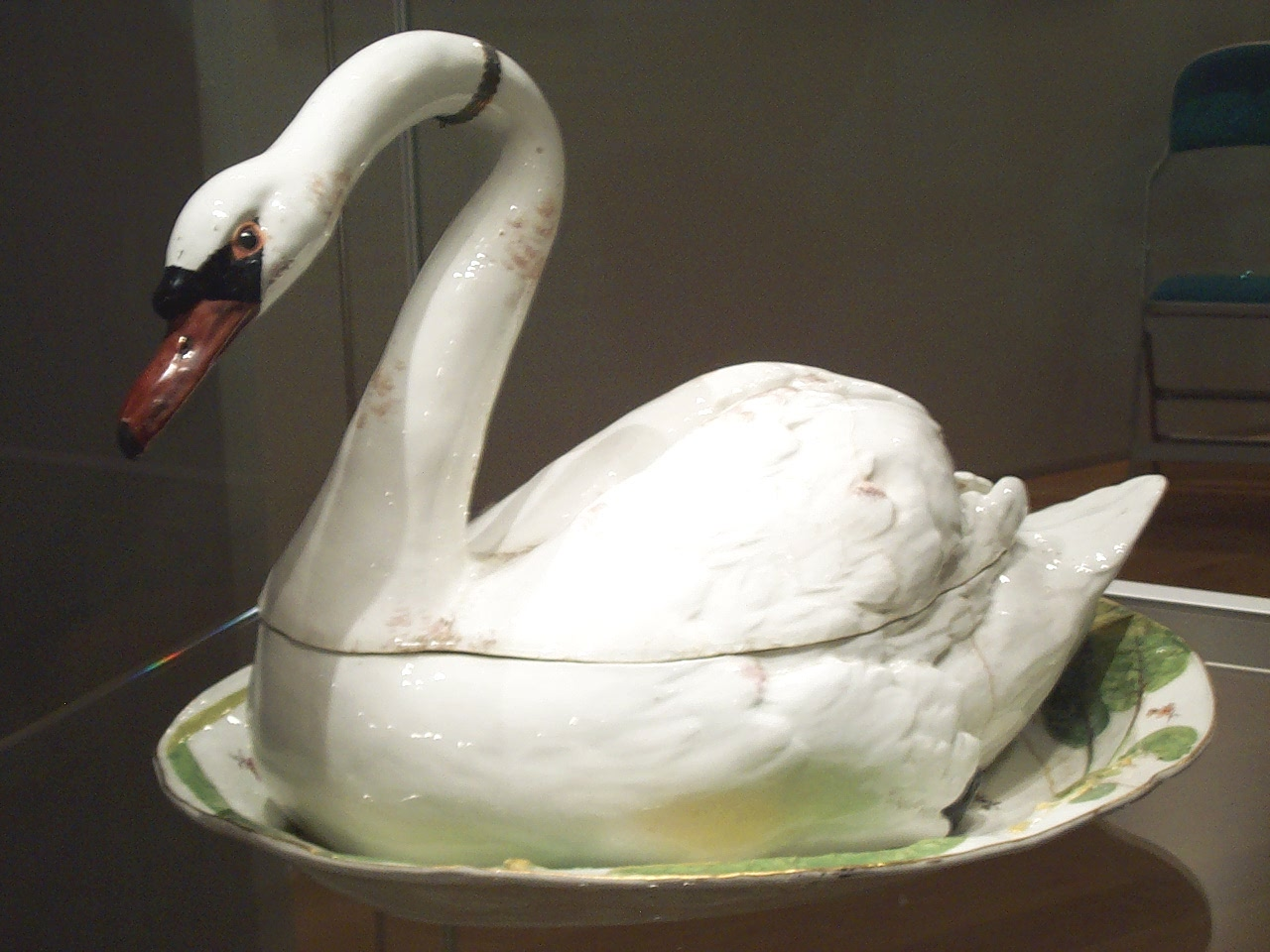
A swan tureen, Chelsea porcelain, England

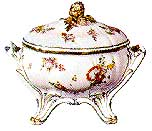
A Sèvres porcelain tureen, 1782, once owned by John and Abigail Adams

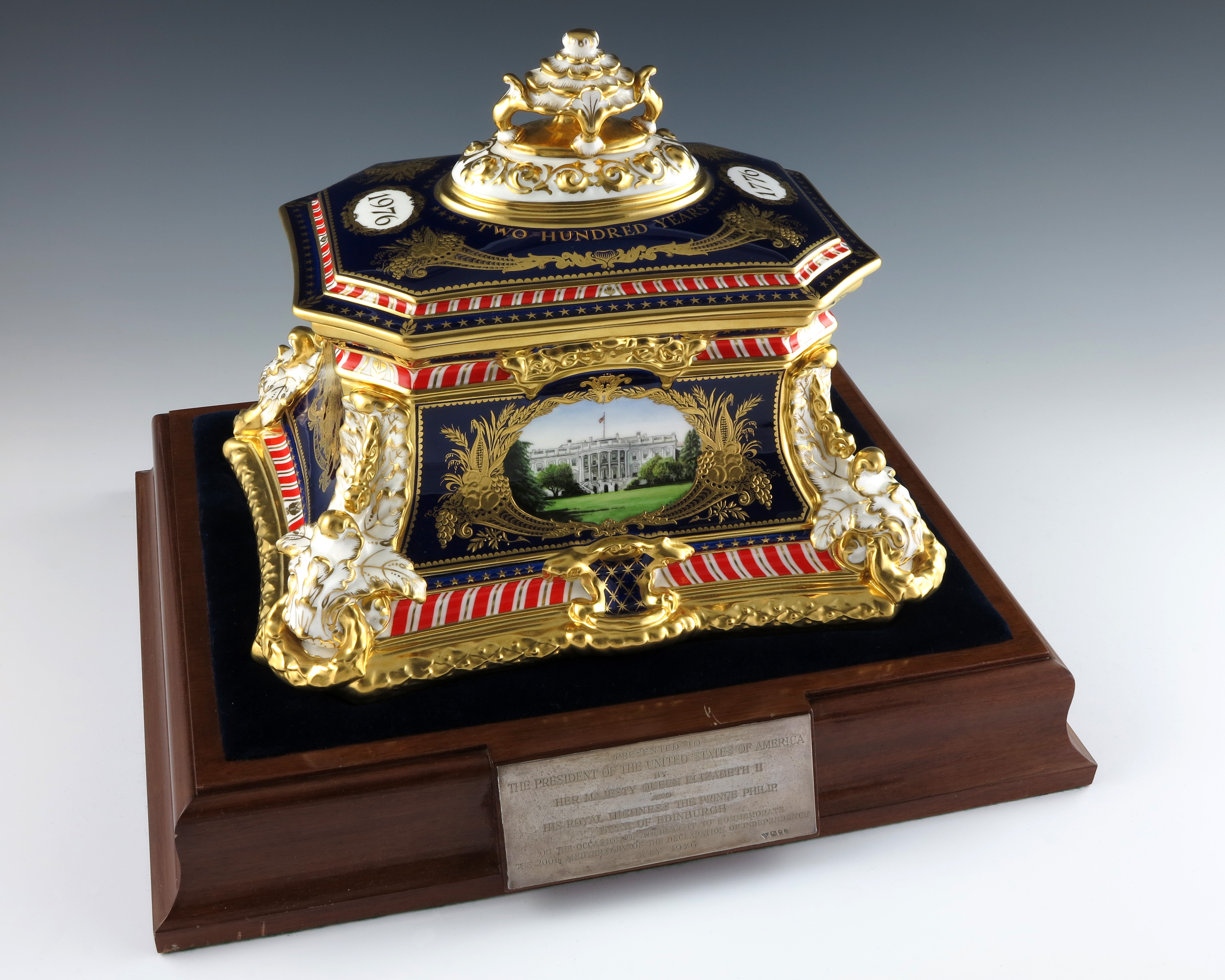
Bicentennial Commemorative tureen painted with red, blue, and gold. Gift of Queen Elizabeth II and Prince Philip of the United Kingdom, 1976

== Collections ==
John T. Dorrance, a member of the family owners of Campbell's Soup, assembled, starting in 1966, the largest representative collection of soup tureens, which has been donated to the Henry Francis DuPont Winterthur Museum.

== See also ==
- Terrine (cookware)
