= Boutehors =

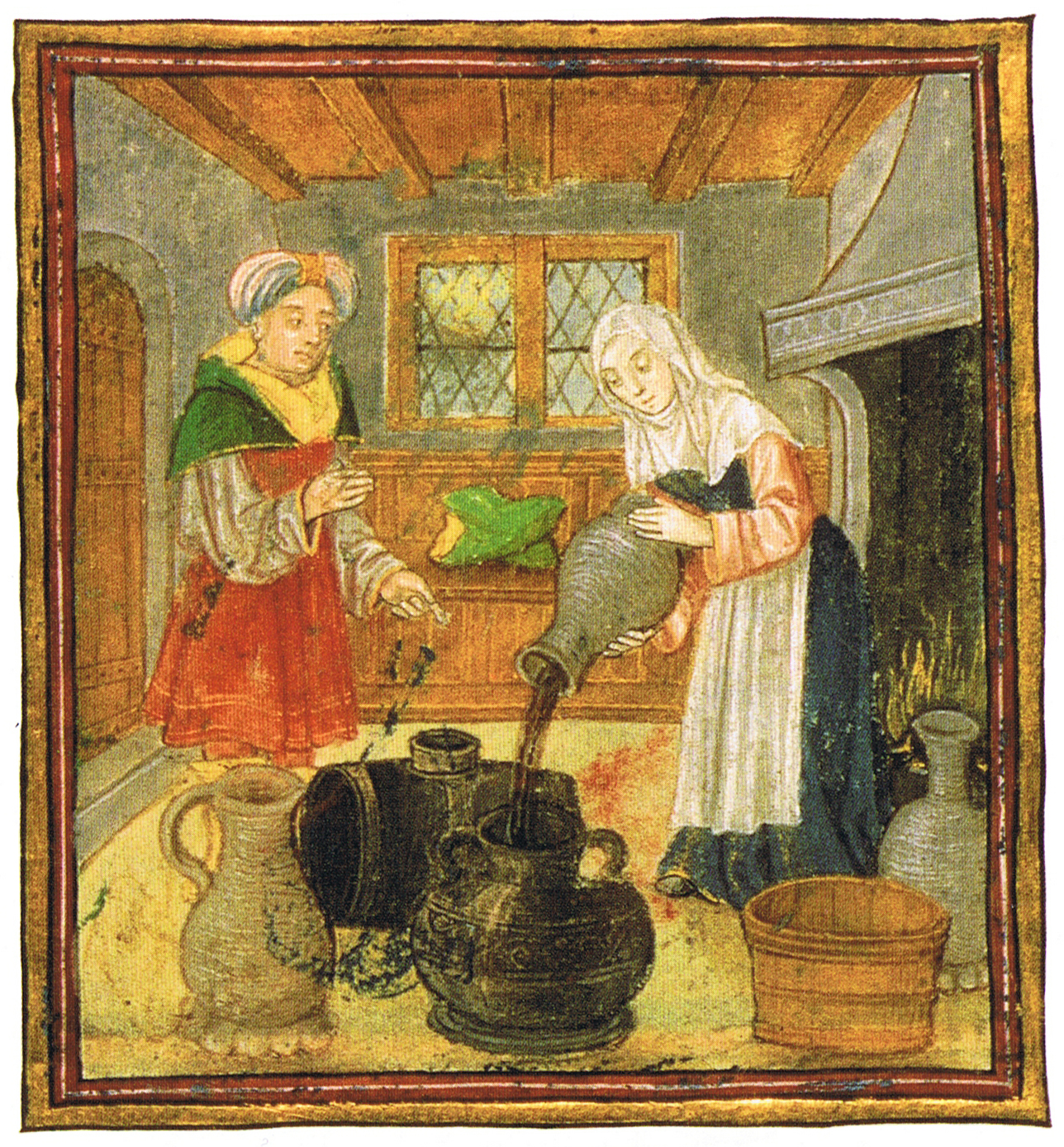
Medieval cuisine

Boutehors (/butor/) was a term pertaining to table practices during the Middle Ages. It refers to the last element of a meal, which was frequently served in another room. Before the boutehors came the serving. It was preceded by the services of the first plate, second plate, the pies, glazing of the desserts, pudding, and clearing of the table.

== Composition ==
Boutehors was used after the table had been cleared off and taken away. It was composed of wine and room spices (the name of which — came from the fact that they were savoured in a separate room). These could be spices or candied fruit, with sugar or honey: ginger, coriander, fennel or candied aniseed, pine nut nougat, quince pastry, hazelnuts or sweetened pistachios.

Room spices were held to facilitate digestion: sugared almonds and jams were considered medicine just as much as sweets. Candied spices were often prepared by apothecaries and brought to patients.

== Status ==
Boutehors was served after saying grace; It was therefore not an integral part of the meal. It was not compulsory, but rather viewed as an extra.

== See also ==
- Service à la française
- Service à la russe

== Notes ==
1. Danielle Jacquart, La Médecine médiévale dans le cadre parisien, XIVe-XVe siècles, Fayard, coll. « Penser la médecine », 1998, 587 p. (ISBN 2-213-59923-8).
