= Tureen with cover (Metropolitan Museum of Art) =

19th-century Chinese porcelain tureen

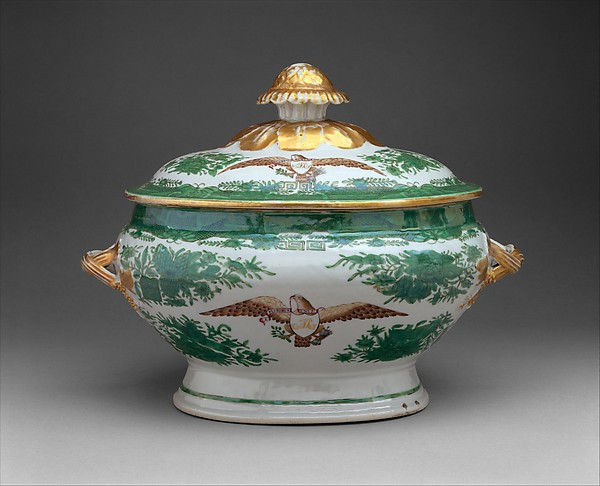
- Year: Early 19th century
- Medium: Hard-paste porcelain
- Location: Metropolitan Museum of Art; New York

Metropolitan Museum of Art has an early 19th century Chinese export porcelain tureen in its collection. The porcelain tureen was produced in Qing dynasty china for export to the United States as part of the Old China Trade; as such, the work features both Chinese depictions of leaves, greenery and an eagle (a symbol of the United States) bearing a shield, olive branch, and arrows. The tureen was originally part of a service.
