= Eyebright (disambiguation) =

Eyebright is the common name for Euphrasia, a flowering plant.

Eyebright may also refer to:

- HMCS Eyebright (previously HMS Eyebright), a corvette of the Canadian navy
- Daisy Eyebright, a pen name of American writer S. O. Johnson (1826–1899)
