= Service à la française =

Type of formal dining

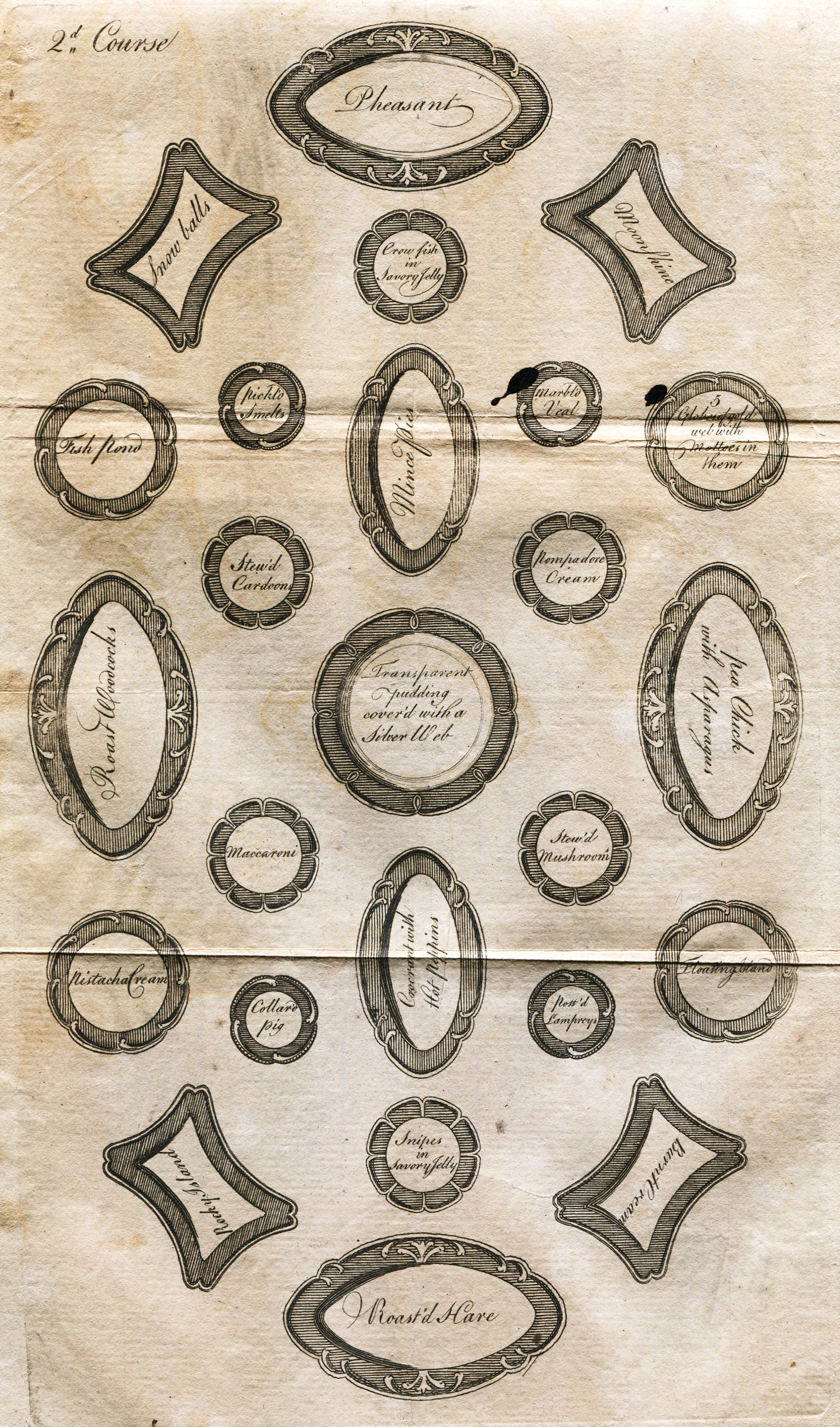
Table layout for the second course, in Elizabeth Raffald's The Experienced English Housekeeper, 4th Edition, 1775. Identifiable dishes include three mammal species, four birds, and four of fishes and seafood.

Service à la française (French: [sɛʁvis a la fʁɑ̃sɛːz], lit. 'service in the French style') is the practice of serving various dishes of a meal at the same time, with the diners helping themselves from the serving dishes. That contrasts to service à la russe ("service in the Russian style") in which dishes are brought to the table sequentially and served individually, portioned by servants.

Formal dinners were served à la française from the Middle Ages to the 19th century, but in the modern era it has been largely supplanted by service à la russe in restaurants. Service à la française remains popular for small and large gatherings in homes, companies, hotels, and other group settings. It is also similar to the Chinese style of serving large groups in many Chinese restaurants.

== History ==
The formalized service à la française was a creation of the Baroque period, helped by the growth of published cookbooks setting out grand dining as it was practiced at the French court, led by François Pierre de la Varenne's Le Cuisinier françois (1651). As in other matters of taste and fashion, France took over from Italy as the leader of Europe, and by the 18th century the French style was diffused across the rest of Europe, and those who could afford them hired French chefs.

Over the course of the 19th century, service à la française was replaced by service à la russe in grand dining. This had the advantage of making the food much hotter when it reached the diner, and reducing the huge number of dishes and condiments previously found on the table at the same time. It also ensured that everybody could taste everything they wanted, which in practice the old system often did not allow. On the other hand, the effect of magnificent profusion was reduced, and many more footmen and more tableware were required, making it an option only the rich could afford. It also reduced the time spent at the table, and the amount of food needed.

== Organization of the meal ==
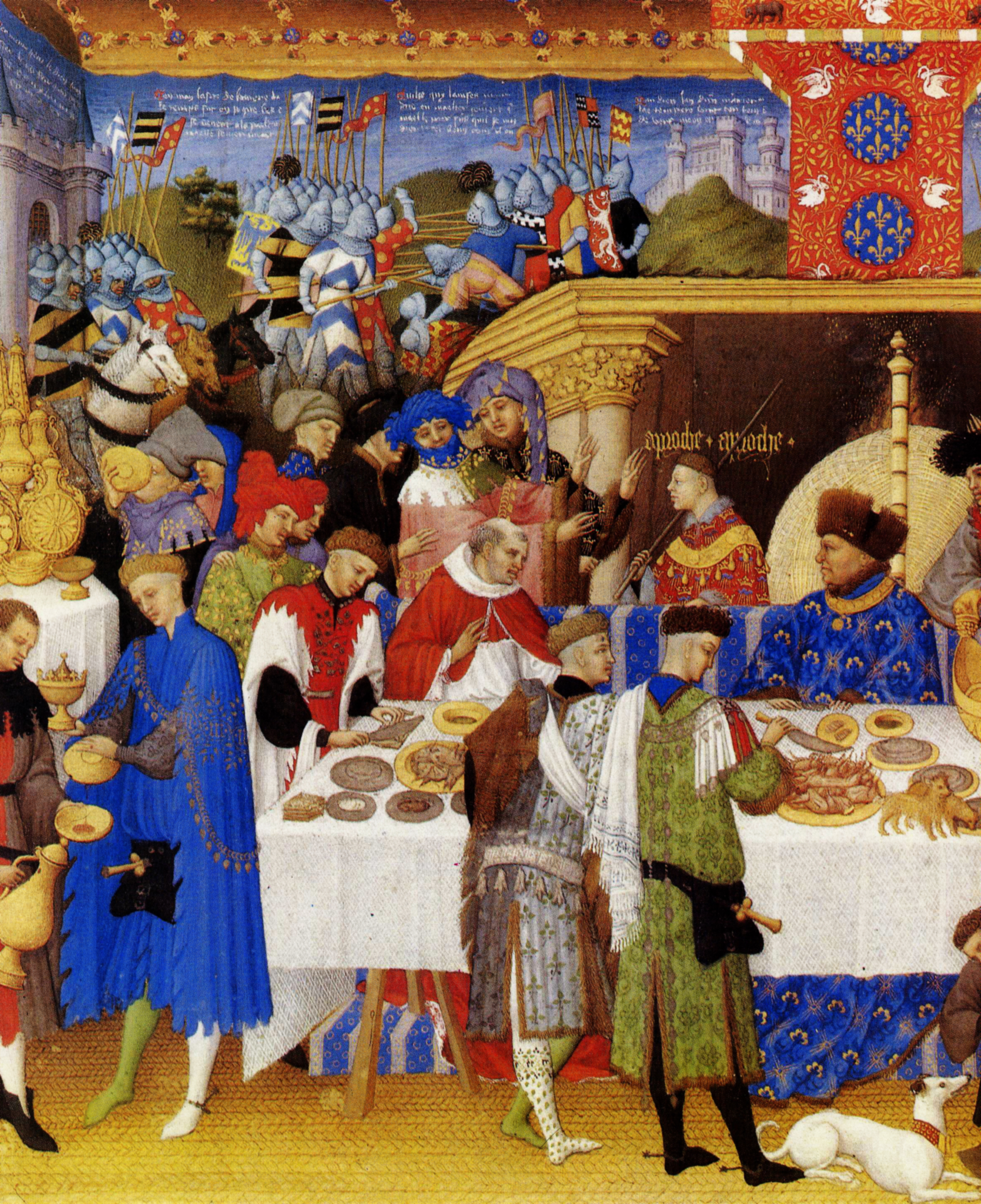
The medieval predecessor of service à la française in the 1410s, Très Riches Heures du Duc de Berry

In service à la française, several stages of the meal, corresponding to the stages of the "Classical Order" of table service, are placed on the table at the same time. Each stage can be presented in its own course, or the stages can be grouped together to produce a meal of fewer courses. Regardless of the presentation on the table, the stages of the meal are consumed in the "Classical" order, known to those attending the meal but rarely evident in contemporaneous menus or descriptions of meals.

The table is set with all the dishes of the first course before the guests enter the dining room. The hostess or host apportions some of the dishes, ladling the soup into individual soup plates and carving the fish and roasts and placing them on platters or individual plates. Servants pass the plates or platters to the guests, or the guests pass the plates themselves from hand to hand. Guests then serve themselves and their neighbours from the other dishes on the table; men are generally expected to serve the women seated next to them.

Some of the tureens and platters may be replaced with other dishes during a given course. Then at the end of each course, all the dishes are removed and the next course is brought to the table. Generally, the same number of dishes is served at every course. The table is cleared for the last time before setting out the dessert, at which time the servants typically leave the dining room.

Cookery books indicate that there should be about four different dishes per guest at each course. Unlike today, when doubling the number of diners, for example, from 12 to 24, would normally mean doubling the quantity prepared of each type of food, in service à la française, the variety of dishes is doubled, in this case leading to over 90 different dishes for a table of 24 guests. At a large dinner, guests could not taste everything on the table, and two guests at different places around the table might well have a full meal without tasting any of the same foods.

Guests might not even be aware of what the many dishes on the table were or be able to see or obtain them. The long account in a letter from a young American lady of a dinner for 18 people on New Year's Day 1852 at an aristocratic English country house (Note: Oakly Park, Bromfield, Shropshire) states, "I cannot tell you how many kinds of soup there were. Suffice it, that mine was most delicious".

Service à la française sometimes required so much food to be set out that it was the custom of some hosts to have a second dinner party the following day, using what was left over for a slightly smaller number of less-important guests. William Makepeace Thackeray's character Major Pendennis (1850) is "indignant at being invited to a 'second-day dinner'".

In the Middle Ages and Renaissance, the best food was placed near the most important guests and the less impressive dishes were placed near the less important guests. By the 17th century, tables were set with similar types of food for every guest.

Until about 1800, no glasses or drinks were on the table at the start of the meal. Footmen were beckoned and brought a salver with a glass of wine, and a decanter of water to dilute it if desired.

== The "Classical Order" of table service ==
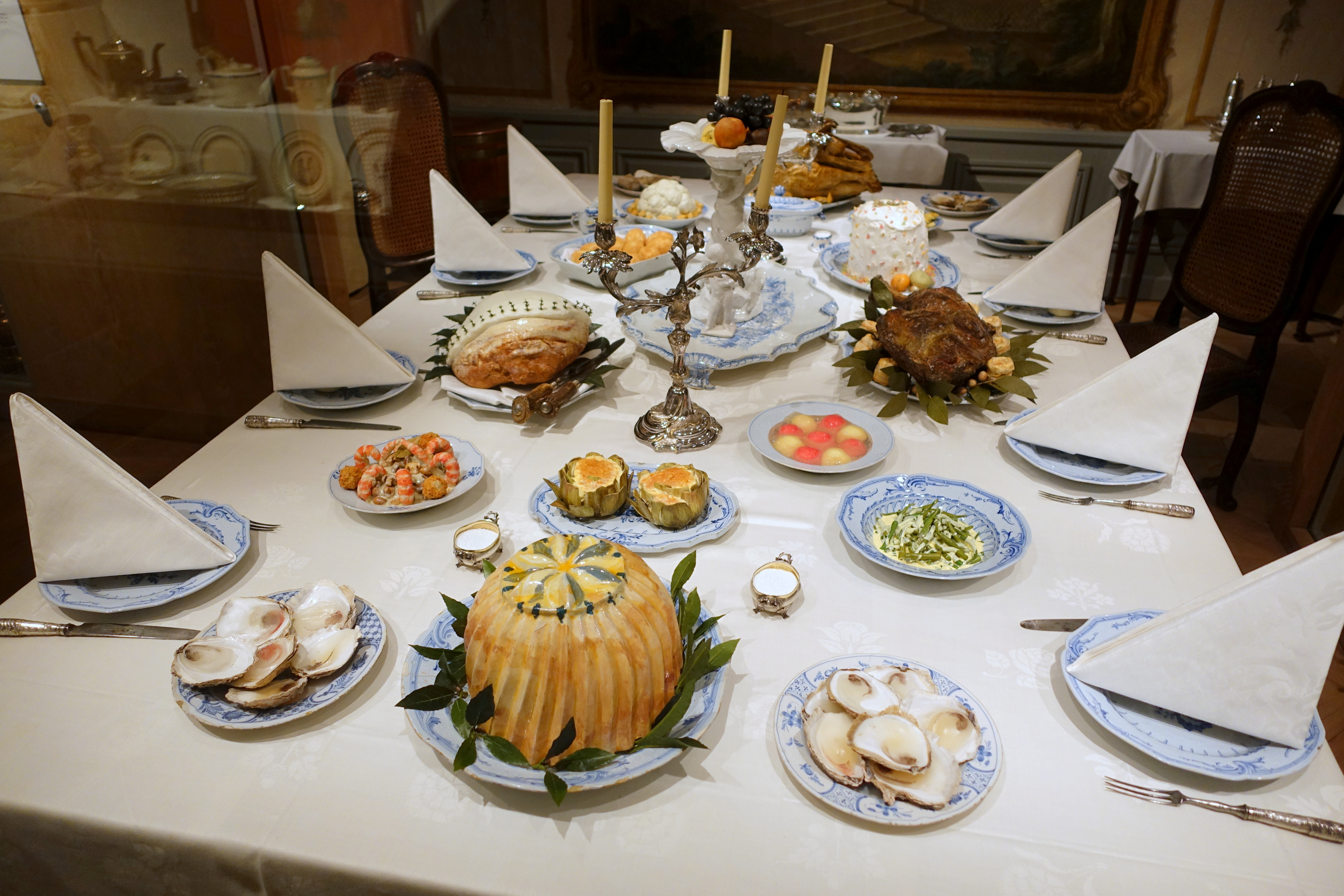
Reconstruction of middle-class table set for eight, around 1800

The "Classical Order" of table service emerged in France in the early 17th century and first appeared in print in 1651 in La Varenne’s Le Cuisinier françois. The Classical meal is composed of five stages: potage, entrée (including hors d’œuvres and relevés), roast, entremets (savory and sweet), and dessert. Each stage is characterized by certain types of dishes largely unique to that stage, each distinguished from the other by their ingredients, cooking methods, and serving temperatures. The distinctions between the stages were at first loosely observed, or perhaps more accurately, the "rules" were in a formative stage for several decades. By the early 18th century, though, the stages of the meal were increasingly rigid.

Each stage could be presented in a separate course, or the stages could be grouped together to produce a meal of fewer courses. Regardless of the presentation on the table, the stages of the meal were consumed in the same order, known to those attending the meal but rarely evident in contemporaneous menus or descriptions of meals.

The meal consistently began with potages.

Entrées on meat days (Note: In accordance with church regulations in force from the Middle Ages to the 19th century, the ingredients for every stage of the meal varied between "meat days" (jours gras, literally "fat days"), when all foods were allowed, and "lean days" (jours maigres), when the church forbade consumption of meat and fowl but not fish. Until the 16th century, white meats (milk, cream, butter, and cheese) and eggs were additionally forbidden in Lent. Beginning in the 17th century, white meats were allowed in Lent. Beginning in the 19th century, eggs were also allowed in Lent.) included butchers' meats (but not ham), suckling pig, domestic fowl, furred and feathered game, and offal. Entrées were typically cooked in moist heat in preparations such as sautés, ragoûts, and fricassées. Meat or fowl might be roasted, but they were always finished in a sauce. Other common entrées were meat pies and fritters. On lean days, fish and eggs replaced meat and fowl in every course. In Lent, though, eggs were not served at any meal until the 19th century, when eggs became increasingly common in Lent. Vegetables were used only in sauces or garnishes; they were not served as a separate dish in the entrée stage of the meal, even on lean days. All entrées were served hot, which was a salient feature of entrées until the 19th century.

In the 18th century, the bouilli, a joint of boiled beef, was the first entrée consumed at the meal after the potages. By the 1820s, the bouilli was no longer routinely served at fine dinners.

The relevé was in origin an entrée, a spit-roasted joint served in a sauce and consumed after the other entrées. By the late 18th century, relevés had come to be considered a distinct stage of the meal consisting of any large joint consumed after the other entrées. On lean days, relevés were typically whole fish served in a sauce, and in the 19th century, whole fish became a classic relevé, even on meat days. Also in the 19th century, relevés came to be served before the other entrées rather than after, essentially replacing the bouilli formerly consumed at that point in the meal.

In the late 17th and 18th centuries, hors d’œuvres were little extra dishes served alongside both entrées and entremets, typically consumed at the end of the given course. They were at first considered to be small entrées or entremets; but by the early 19th century, hors d’œuvre had come to be considered a distinct stage of the meal that was consumed immediately after the potages and before the entrées and relevés.

Roasts on meat days included domestic fowl, feathered game, and small furred game. The fowl and game were spit-roasted and nicely browned, served "dry" and not in a sauce or ragoût, although sauces might be served separately. In the 18th and early 19th centuries, large cuts of roasted butcher's meat and furred game were not considered appropriate for the roast course and they were instead served as relevés; but in the late 19th century, large joints in the roast course became common. On lean days, whole fish replaced meat-day roasts, but the fish were poached or fried, not roasted. The fish were substitutions or counterparts to the roasts served on meat days, corresponding to their position in the meal but not their cooking method. The fish for the roast course were served "dry", often with the scales still attached, and sauces might be served on the side, as for roasts on meat days.

Salads were served with the roast. Salads were often considered to be a sort of entremets, but they were usually mentioned separately from the other entremets.

Entremets were the last dishes served from the kitchen. They were a varied selection of chilled meats, hot vegetables, hot and cold sweet dishes, and other dishes like vegetable and cheese fritters.

Dessert consisted of items "from the storeroom" (de l'office), including fresh, stewed, preserved, and dried fruits; fruit jellies; cheese and other dairy dishes; dry biscuits (cookies) and wafers; and, beginning in the mid-18th century, ices and petits fours. Because the dishes in the dessert course were not prepared in the kitchen, dessert was often not included on menus or in descriptions of meals, and the stated number of courses was thus often fewer by one than the actual number of courses served.

Beginning in the early 19th century, the meal often included a small glass of chilled spirits or frozen punch between courses at the midpoint of the meal. In a 4-course meal, it was typically served after the roast, and in a 3-course meal, before the roast. The drink, the coup du milieu, was not considered a distinct stage of the meal and was not often included on menus.

The stages of the meal could be presented in 5, 4, or 3 courses. Some meals, particularly meals other than dinner, were presented in a single course, a distinct type of service called an ambigu.

While there are many variations in the details, the following arrangements are characteristic of meals from the mid-17th century to the late 19th-century. Note that hors d'œuvres and relevés in the descriptions were not distinct stages of the meal in the 17th century. Note also that in the 19th century, relevés were increasingly served before the other entrées, not after them.

Meals with five courses are attested from the mid-17th to the mid-18th century by La Varenne (1651), Pierre de Lune (1662), Louis Liger (1711), François Marin (1739), and Menon (1739).

1. Potage + hors d'œuvre
2. Entrée + relevé
3. Roast + salad
4. Entremets
5. Dessert

Meals with four courses are attested from the mid-17th to the early-19th century by L.S.R (1674), Jean Ribou (1708), Menon (1739), Menon (1746), Dictionnaire portatif de cuisine, d’office, et de distillation (1767), and Grimod de La Reynière (1805).

1. Potage + hors d’œuvre + entrée + relevé
2. Roast + salad
3. Entremets
4. Dessert

Meals with three courses are attested from the late-17th to the mid-19th century by François Massialot (1691), Nicolas Audiger (1692), Menon (1746), Manuel de Gastronomie (1825), Urbain Dubois (1856), and Dictionnaire universel de la Vie pratique à la ville et à la campagne (1882). Beginning in the early 19th century, meals of three courses were the most common type of table service.

1. Potage + hors d’œuvre + entrée + relevé
2. Roast + salad + entremets
3. Dessert

== See also ==
- Buffet
- Degustation
- Silver service
- Small plates
- Tasting menu

== Notes, references, and sources ==
=== Sources ===
- Audiger, Nicolas (1692). La Maison reglée. Paris: Michel Brunet.
- Bonnefons, Nicolas de (1654). Les Délices de la Campagne. Paris: Pierre Des-Hayes.
- Brillat-Savarin, Jean Anthelme (1826). Physiologie du goût, ou Méditations de Gastronomie transcendante. Vol. 1. Paris: A. Sautelet et Cie.
- Cosnett, Thomas (1823). The Footman's Directory and Butler's Remembrancer. London: for the author.
- Dictionnaire portatif de cuisine, d’office, et de distillation. Paris: Vincent. 1767.
- Dictionnaire universel de la Vie pratique à la ville et à la campagne (6 ed.). Paris: Librairie Hachette et Cie. 1882.
- Dubois, Urbain (1856). Cuisine classique. Paris: Les Auteur.
- Flanders, Judith (2003). The Victorian House: Domestic Life from Childbirth to Deathbed. New York: HarperCollins. ISBN 0007131895.
- Flandrin, Jean-Louis (2007) [2001]. Arranging the Meal: A History of Table Service in France [L’Ordre des mets]. Translated by Johnson, Julie E. Berkeley: University of California Press. ISBN 978-0520238855.
- Grimod de La Reynière, Alexandre-Balthazar-Laurent (1805). Almanach des Gourmands, troisième année. Paris: Maradan.
- L.S.R. (1674). L’Art de bien traiter divisé en trois parties. Paris: Jean du Puis.
- La Varenne, François Pierre (1651). Le Cuisinier françois. Paris: Pierre David.
- Liger, Louis (1711). Le Ménage des champs, et le jardinier françois. Paris: Michel David.
- Lune, Pierre de (1662). Le Nouveau et parfait maistre d’hostel royal. Paris: Estienne Loyson.
- Manuel de Gastronomie. Paris: Levrault. 1825.
- Marin, François (1739). Les Dons de Comus, ou les Délices de la Table. Paris: Prault.
- Massialot, François (1691). Le cuisinier roïal et bourgeois. Paris: Charles de Sercy.
- Menon, Joseph (1739). Nouveau traité de la cuisine. Paris: Paulus-du-Mesnil.
- Menon, Joseph (1746). La Cuisinière bourgeoise. Paris: Guillyn.
- Ribou, Jean, ed. (1708). L’École parfaite des officiers de bouche. Paris: Jean Ribou.
- Strong, Roy (2002). Feast: A History of Grand Eating. London: Jonathan Cape. ISBN 978-0151007585.
