= Louis Liger =

French agronomist

Louis Liger (1658–1717) was a French agronomist and prolific writer on flora and fauna. He was born in Auxerre, Province of Burgundy in January 1658 and died at Guerchi near his birthplace on 6 November 1717 at age 59.
