= Menon (cookbook author) =

18th-century French cookbook writer

Menon was the most prolific cookbook author in 18th-century France. Very little is known of his life as a whole. The National Library of France (Bibliothèque Nationale de France) lists his name as Joseph Menon. His numerous works were often reprinted, sometimes anonymously.

The best-known of his books is probably La Cuisinière bourgeoise, which was first published in 1746 and every year after for the next century, even during the French Revolution. It was the most reprinted French cookbook and the only one written before the French Revolution to be reprinted after 1800. Before the publication of La Cuisinière bourgeoise, French cookbooks claimed to make a royal and elite cuisine available to all budgets. Menon's book took the opposite approach, presenting a cuisine with "modest origins" that would be sought after by elites. "Bourgeois" or middle-class cuisine was women's cooking, hence the feminine cook in the book's title.

== Principal works ==
- Nouveau Traité de la Cuisine, Paris, 1739, 3 vol. in-12;
- La Cuisinière bourgeoise, Paris, 1746, 2 vol. in-12;
- La Science du Maître d’Hôtel cuisinier, avec des Observations sur la connaissance et la propriété des aliments, Paris, 1749, in-12;
- Les Soupers de la Cour, ou l’art de travailler toutes sortes d’aliments pour servir les meilleures tables, Paris, 1758, 4 vol. in-12;
- Traité historique et pratique de la Cuisine, Paris, 1758, 2 vol. in-12;
- Le Nouveau Cuisinier français, 3 vol. in-12;
- Cuisine et Office de Sante, Paris, 1758, in-12;
- Manuel des Officiers de bouche, Paris, 1759, in-12;
- La Science du Maître d’hôtel confiseur, Paris, 1768, in-12

== Bibliography & Further reading ==
- Hoefer, Ferdinand (1861). Nouvelle Biographie générale, t. 34. Paris: Firmin-Didot, p. 998.
- Rambourg, Patrick (2010). Histoire de la cuisine et de la gastronomie françaises. Paris: Ed. Perrin (coll. tempus n° 359), 381 pages. ISBN 978-2-262-03318-7
- Takats, Sean (2011). The Expert Cook in Enlightenment France. Baltimore: The Johns Hopkins University Press.
