= Silver service =

Method of food service

Silver service (in British English) is a method of food service at the table, with the waiter transferring food from a serving dish to the guest's plate, always from the left. It is performed by a waiter using service forks and spoons from the diner's left. In France, it is now known as service à l'anglaise ("English service"), although historically that meant something else, with the hostess serving out the soup at one end of the table, and later the host carving a joint of meat at the other end, and diners serving themselves with other dishes present.

A modification of silver service is known as the butler service.

== Features ==
- Silver service food is served from the left. Gravy is served from the left.
- Meals are served to the diner from platters, not plated in the kitchen.
- The guest to the host's right is served first, usually a female guest.
- Service continues anti-clockwise ending with the host.
- Plates are cleared from the right, glasses from the right, again by starting with the guest to the host's right.
- Glasses are positioned above the knife blade and stacked in a diagonal to the right and away, with wine (by course) in order and then water glass in front. This is dependent on the size of the glasses used, as a smaller glass sometimes goes in front so it can be filled easily and the diner can reach it.
- At a wedding, the bride is served first, followed by the bride's mother, then the bridegroom, then to the left of the "top table" with the bridal party, restarting again at the other side of the table, with the best man first, then any other member of the bridegroom's party.

Silver service, like all formal food service, is oriented for a right-handed waiter. Left-handed waiters may use their right hand; to serve the food, the waiter stands behind the guest and to the guest's left, holds or supports the platter with their left hand and serves the food with their right hand. It is common for the waiter to hold the serving fork above the serving spoon both in the right hand, and use the fingers to manipulate the two as a pincer for picking up, holding and transferring the food. This technique or form requires much practice and dexterity.

In butler service, the diner helps themselves from a serving plate held by the butler. Traditionally, this type of service was used on Sunday evenings, when the waiting staff had the evening off and the butler helped out at dinner. In France, this kind of service is known as service à la française ("French service"), having again a very different meaning from the historical one.

== See also ==
- Household silver
- Table setting
- Service à la russe
- Service à la française
