= Friedrich Christian Weber =

German diplomat (died 1739)

Friedrich Christian Weber (died 1739) was an 18th-century German diplomat and writer.

He was born in Hanover and, after the succession of fellow Hanoverian George I of Great Britain to the throne of the Kingdom of Great Britain in 1714, represented English interests at the Russian court of Peter the Great. He did not excel as a diplomat, but published one of the most important accounts of the period during and immediately after Peter's reign. His account, entitled "Das veraenderte Russland", appeared in three volumes in 1721, 1739 and 1740.

Weber returned from Russia in 1719. "Das veraenderte Russland" was translated into English and published in 1722-1723 as "The Present State of Russia", the second volume of which comprised Lorenz Lange's account of his first journey to China.

== Literature ==
- Das Veränderte Russland, in welchem die ietzige Verfassung Des Geist- und Weltlichen Regiments; der Krieges-Staat zu Lande und zu Wasser; Wahre Zustand der Rußischen Finantzen; die geöffneten Berg-Wercke; die eingeführte Academien, Künste, Manufacturen, ergangene Verordnungen, Geschäfte mit denen Asiatischen Nachbahren und Vasallen, nebst der allerneuesten Nachricht von diesen Völckern, Die Begebenheiten des Czarewitzen, und was sich sonst merckwürdiges in Rußland zugetragen, Nebst verschiedenen andern bißher unbekannten Nachrichten In einem Biß 1720. gehenden JOURNAL vorgestellet werden, Mit einer accuraten Land-Carte und Kupfferstichen versehen. Nicolaus Förster, Frankfurt 1721 (Online version at the LOC)

== Sources ==
- "Вебер, Христиан-Фридрих" . Brockhaus and Efron Encyclopedic Dictionary (in Russian). 1906.
