= Oyster fork =

Specialized fork for eating oysters

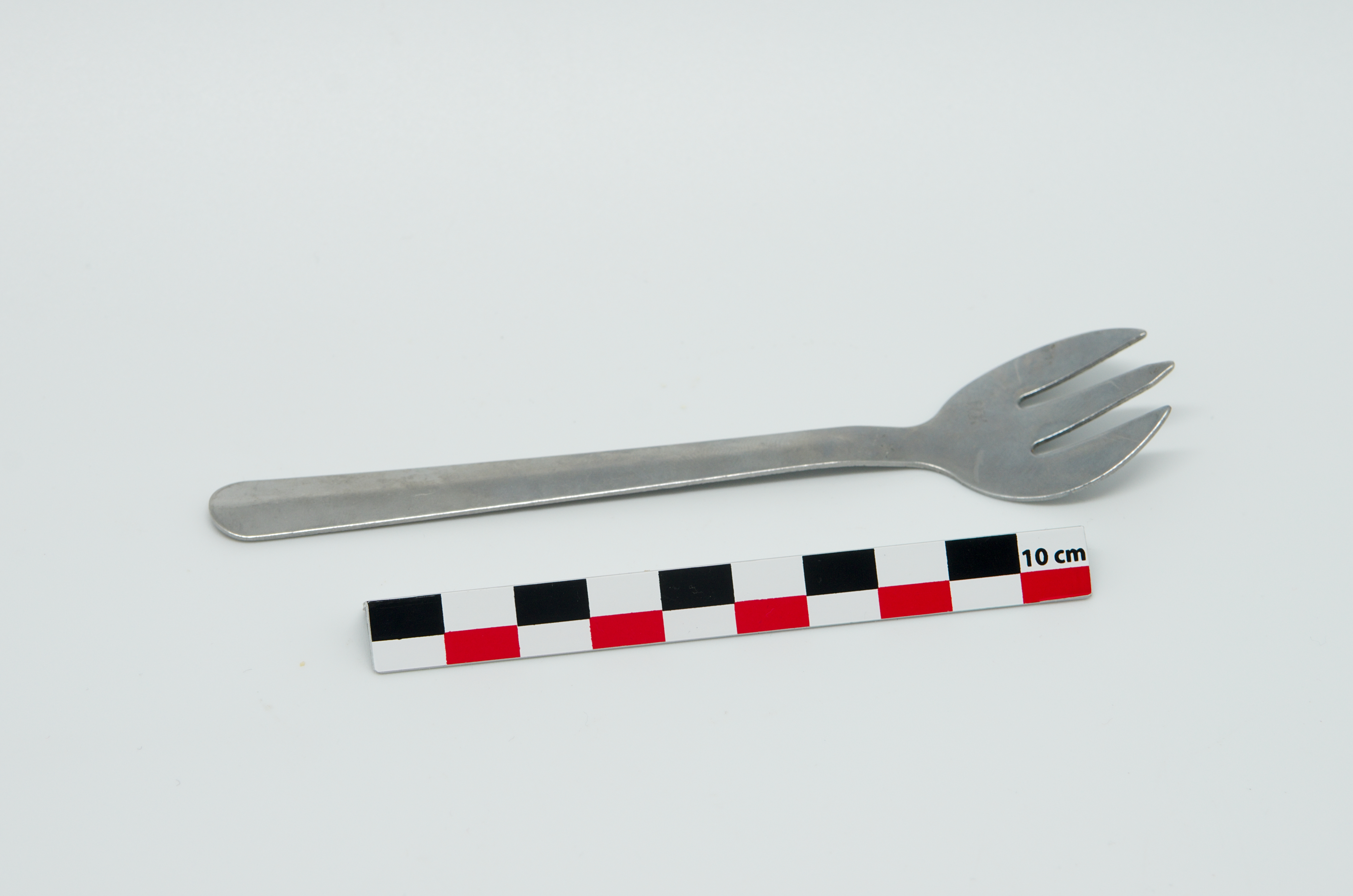
Oyster fork

An oyster fork, also known as a cocktail fork or seafood fork, is a small, specialized fork used for eating an oyster (and other appetizers like shrimp cocktail). It is the smallest fork in a traditional set of silverware. If this specialized fork is absent from the place setting, the smallest fork is used instead.

Oyster forks typically have three short, broad tines. The left tine is often wider than the others and may have a sharpened or notched edge, designed to help cut the adductor muscle that attaches the oyster to its shell.

In a table setting, the oyster fork is the only fork placed to the right of the dinner plate. It is typically set to the right of the soup spoon, or sometimes laid in the bowl of the soup spoon itself. Von Drachenfels opines that this utensil is only used for informal dining.

== History ==
The oyster fork is a relatively modern invention (produced in England since 1790) that gained popularity in the Victorian era, around the 1840s. The small two- and three-tined forks were used since antiquity, but the somewhat curved outer tines shaped like blades to release oyster from the shell were new.

This period saw an explosion in the creation of specialized silverware for every conceivable food, driven by both elaborate dining customs and new manufacturing techniques. The immense popularity of oysters in both Europe and North America during the 19th century—often referred to as an "oyster craze"—created a specific need for a dedicated utensil.

== Design ==
Oyster forks are typically 4.5 to 5.5 inches (11 to 14 cm) in length. While the three-tine design is most common, some patterns feature four tines. The tines are often slightly curved to cradle the oyster as it is lifted from the shell.

Materials vary from sterling silver and silverplate in antique or high-end sets to stainless steel in modern flatware. The handle designs vary widely by manufacturer and pattern, from simple and functional to highly ornate.

== Etiquette ==
According to Western dining etiquette, the oyster fork is placed to the far right of the dinner plate, beyond the knives and the soup spoon. It is the only fork placed on the right side. This placement is because oysters are typically served as the first course, and utensils are arranged in the order of use from the outside in.

== Alternative names and uses ==
The primary purpose of the oyster fork was to handle oysters served on the half-shell, so in the Victorian era this utensil was only known as "oyster fork". The terms cocktail fork and seafood fork got into use as other seafood became popular.

== Sources ==
- Baldrige, Letitia (2009-11-24). Letitia Baldrige's New Manners for New Times: A Complete Guide to Etiquette. Simon and Schuster. ISBN 978-1-4391-8854-5.
- Coffin, Sarah (2006). Feeding Desire: Design and the tools of the table, 1500-2005. New York: Cooper-Hewitt Museum. ISBN 2-84323-845-5.
- Schollander, Wendell; Schollander, Wes (2002). Forgotten Elegance: The Art, Artifacts, and Peculiar History of Victorian and Edwardian Entertaining in America. Bloomsbury Academic. ISBN 978-0-313-31685-2.
- Von Drachenfels, Susanne (2000). The Art of the Table: A Complete Guide to Table Setting, Table Manners, and Tableware. Simon & Schuster. ISBN 978-0-684-84732-0.
- Young, Carolin C. (2013). "Silverware". In Smith, Andrew F. (ed.). The Oxford Encyclopedia of Food and Drink in America. New York, NY: Oxford University Press, USA. ISBN 978-0-19-973922-6.
