= Baron Brisse =

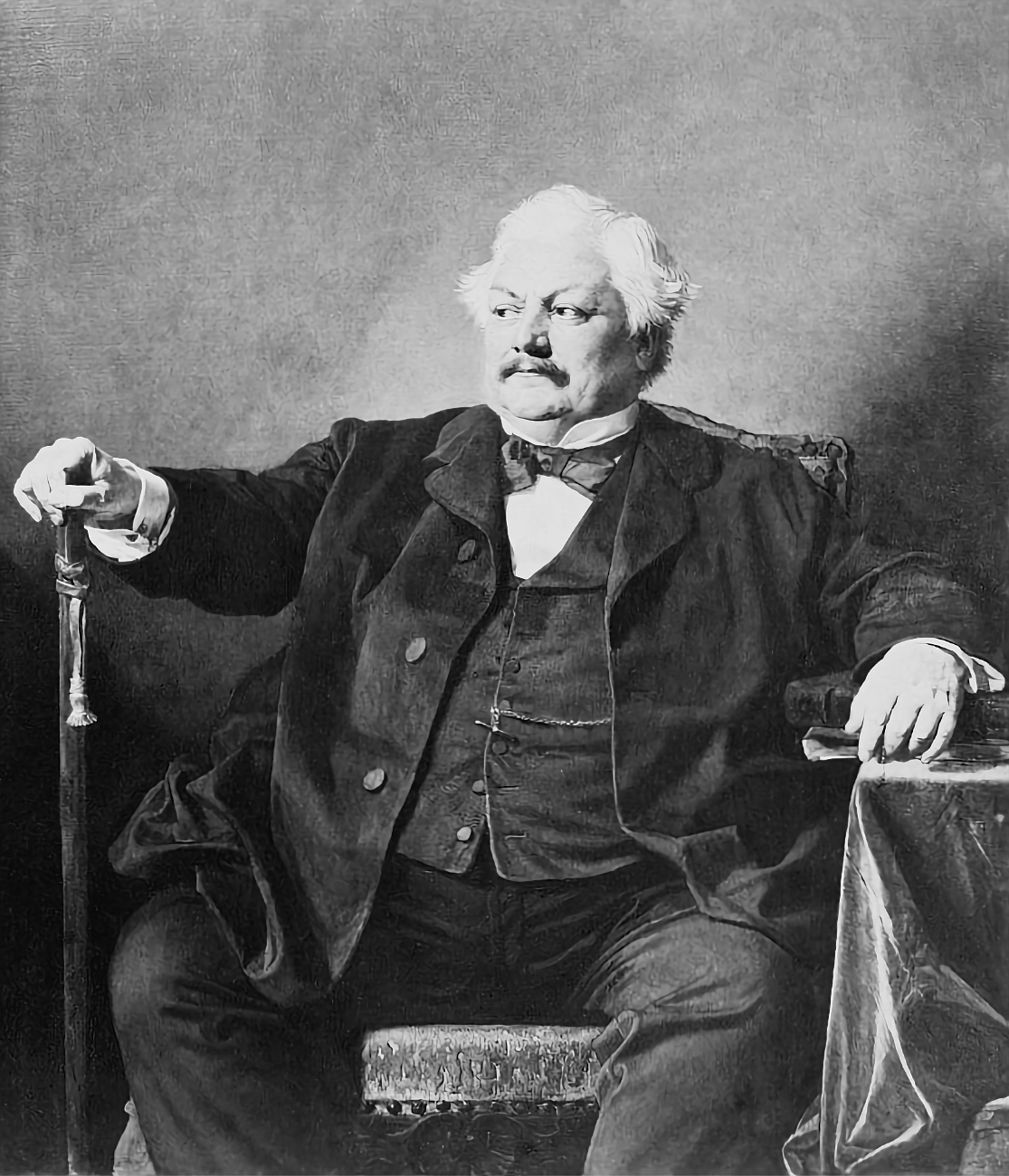
Brisse in his later years

Ildéfonse-Léon Brisse (20 September 1807 – 1 June 1876), known as Baron Brisse, was a French gourmet and journalist. He has been described in a biographical sketch as one of the founders of culinary journalism, being to the Second French Empire what Grimod de La Reynière was to the First.

== Life and career ==
Ildéfonse-Léon Brisse was born in Gémenos, near Marseille, on 20 September 1803. He entered the public service in the Department of Water and Forestry under Louis-Philippe I but left after the 1848 revolution. He turned to journalism, specialising in articles on gastronomy. He was initially a freelancer at the Abeille impériale for a small salary that forced him to eat in the cheap restaurants of the Boulevard des Batignolles. In 1864 he founded a gastronomic journal, Salle à manger, chronique de la table, but it was a not a success and quickly folded.

Success came with the collaboration with Émile de Girardin who offered him a daily column in his newspaper La Liberté, which he had bought in 1866. Brisse wrote a daily gastronomic chronicle that included a suggested seasonal menu per day. The column was a great success, increased the circulation of the paper and was imitated by many newspapers. Brisse incorporated his daily columns into a book published in 1867, Le calendrier gastronomique pour l'année 1867. He published Les 365 menus du baron Brisse in 1868, La petite cuisine du baron Brisse in 1870 and Les 366 menus du baron Brisse in 1872 (a leap year).

According to one food historian, Brisse had neither the erudition of Grimod de La Reynière nor the philosophy of Brillat-Savarin, but he was "a master in the Art of the Table". In a biographical sketch published in 2013 Jean Vitaux described Brisse as "one of the founders of culinary journalism, [who] was to the Second Empire what Grimod de La Reynière was to the First ... a caricature, pleasant, whimsical, Rabelaisian character".

In 1872 Brisse moved from Paris to Fontenay-aux-Roses, living at the famous auberge Gigout, where he entertained his friends. He died there on 1 June 1876, aged 62.

== Dishes named after him ==
Several dishes have been named in Baron Brisse's honour:

- Consommé Baron Brisse: beef consommé garnished with rice and cubes of egg custard in three colours: cream, spinach and truffle.
- Rouget Baron Brisse: red mullet coated with flour, brushed with oil, grilled, garnished with pommes parisienne (small spheres of potato, fried in butter and oil) and herb butter.
- Saumon Baron Brisse: salmon cut in slices, grilled, covered with Madeira sauce, garnished with poached oysters and shrimp dumplings.
- Sole Baron Brisse: Dover sole fillets stuffed with pike forcemeat mixed with purée of crayfish, folded, poached in white wine and mushroom sauce, covered with sliced truffles, mushrooms and crayfish tails, coated with cream sauce flavoured with sherry and glazed.
- Tournedos Baron Brisse: Beef fillet steaks with chopped tomatoes on top; garnished with soufflé potatoes and artichoke hearts filled with small truffle balls; served with demi-glace with truffle essence.
- Cotelette de mouton Baron Brisse: Mutton chop browned and casseroled with diced celery, garnished with an artichoke heart filled with mushroom purée and pommes Parisienne.

== Sources ==
- Bickel, Walter (1989). Hering's Dictionary of Classical and Modern Cookery (eleventh ed.). London: Virtue. ISBN 978-3-8057-0307-9.
- Christian, Guy (1962). An Illustrated History of French Cuisine, from Charlemagne to Charles de Gaulle. New York: Bramhall House. OCLC 3264517.
