= Amy Vanderbilt =

American Author and Socialite

- Vanderbilt in 1972
- Born: July 22, 1908; New York City, U.S.
- Died: December 27, 1974 (aged 66); New York City, U.S.
- Occupation: Writer
- Spouses: Robert S. Brinkerhoff (m. 1929; div. 1932) Morton G. Clark (m. 1935) Hans Knopf (m. 1945) Curtis B. Kellar (m. 1968)
- Children: 3

Amy Osborne Vanderbilt (July 22, 1908 – December 27, 1974) was an American authority on etiquette. In 1952 she published the best-selling book Amy Vanderbilt's Complete Book of Etiquette. The book, later retitled Amy Vanderbilt's Etiquette, has been updated and is still in circulation. Its longtime popularity has led to it being considered a standard of etiquette writing.

She is also the author or collector of cooking materials, including the 1961 book Amy Vanderbilt's Complete Cook Book illustrated by Andy Warhol. This cookbook's illustrations are attributed to "Andrew Warhol", and predate Andy Warhol's first New York solo pop art exhibition. His illustrations are simple line drawings in pen and ink.

== Biography ==
Amy Vanderbilt claimed descent from Jan Aertson van der Bilt, who immigrated to the Dutch colony of New Netherland in 1650 and was also the ancestor of Commodore Cornelius Vanderbilt, the 19th-century railroad magnate and millionaire, a distant cousin of Amy's.

She was born in Staten Island, the daughter of Joseph Mortimer Vanderbilt, an insurance broker, and Mary Estelle Brooks Vanderbilt, and worked as a part-time reporter for the Staten Island Advance when she was 16 while attending Curtis High School. She was educated in Switzerland and at the Packer Collegiate Institute in Brooklyn before attending New York University. She worked in advertising and public relations, and published her book after five years of research. From 1954 to 1960, she hosted the television program It's in Good Taste and from 1960 to 1962, she hosted the radio program The Right Thing to Do. She also worked as a consultant for several agencies and organizations, including the U.S. Department of State.

Vanderbilt was married four times and divorced three times. From 1929 to 1932, she was married to Robert S. Brinkerhoff. In 1935, she married Morton G. Clark. In 1945, she married Hans Knopf, a noted magazine photographer. In 1968, she married Curtis B. Kellar, a lawyer for Mobil Oil. Vanderbilt had three sons: Lincoln Gill Clark, Paul Vanderbilt Knopf, and Stephen John Knopf.

On December 27, 1974, she died from multiple fractures of the skull after falling or jumping from a second-floor window in her townhouse at 438 East 87th Street in New York. It remains unclear whether her fall was accidental (perhaps due to her hypertension medication, which friends and relatives said caused severe dizzy spells) or suicide. She was buried at the Cemetery of the Evergreens in Brooklyn, New York.
