= S. O. Johnson =

American writer

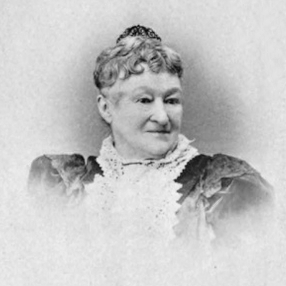
- Born: June 1, 1826; Springfield, Massachusetts, U.S.
- Died: October 26, 1899 (aged 73); Holliston, Massachusetts, U.S.
- Occupation: author
- Spouse: James H. Johnson (m. 1847; died 1887)
- Writing career
- Pen name: "Daisy Eyebright", "Cousin Daisy", "Mrs. S. O. Johnson"
- Subjects: etiquette, gardening, household hints, recipes

S. O. Johnson (née, Edwards; pen names, Daisy Eyebright, Cousin Daisy; June 1, 1826 – October 26, 1899) was an American writer. She wrote books on etiquette, gardening, household hints, and recipes as well as thousands of newspaper articles. She made multiple press trips around the country, which increased her press connections.

== Biography ==
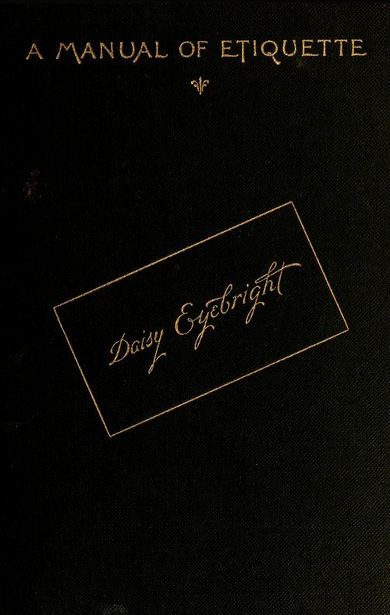
A Manual of Etiquette

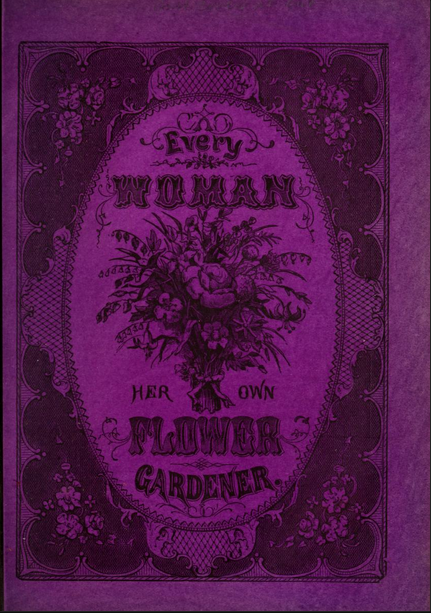
Every Woman Her Own Flower Gardener

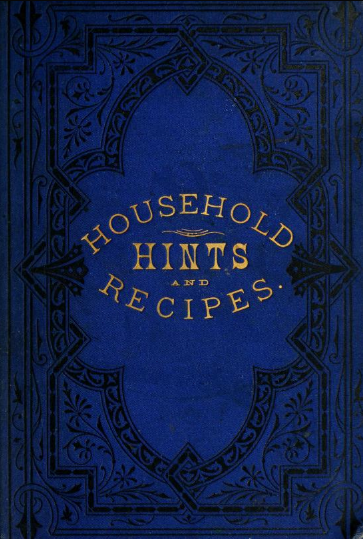
Household Hints and Recipes

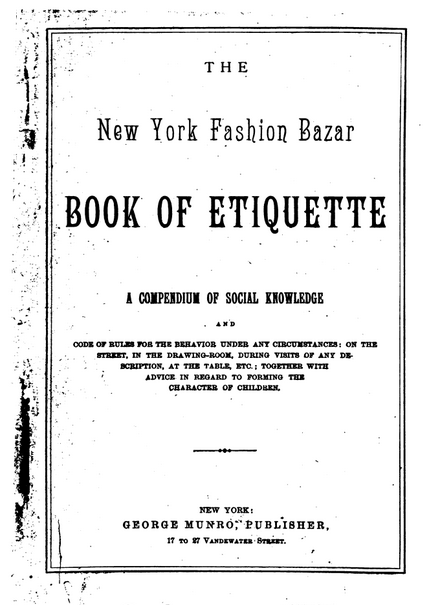
The New York Fashion Bazar Book of Etiquette

Sophia Orne Edwards was born at Springfield, Massachusetts, June 1, 1826. Her parents were Elisha (1795-1840) and Eunice (Lombard) Edwards. Johnson had eight siblings, four brother and four sisters, including Caroline, Charlotte, William, Julia, Oliver, and Mary.

Johnson was educated at Prof. William Wells' School at Cambridge, Massachusetts, and early in life showed a great fondness for literature.

In November, 1847, she married Col. James H. Johnson, of Bath, New Hampshire, who was a member of the twenty-ninth and thirtieth congresses. A large part of the first two years of her married life was passed at Washington, D.C. where she met fine society. Mr. Johnson had important business interests in Bath, and there they established their home. Subsequently, her husband built a residence in Springfield, and for many years, the latter city was the winter home of the family.

In 1869, a severe freshet in northern New Hampshire carried away in ten minutes all the lumber mills of Colonel Johnson, destroying his chief income. Mrs. Johnson began to write for the Springfield, Massachusetts Republican, the Country Gentleman, Albany, New York, and the New England Farmer, Boston, Massachusetts. In 1871, she began a serial, "Daisy Eyebright's Journal,” for the Country Gentleman, which ran sixteen months. She was known for many years to a large circle of readers as "Daisy Eyebright", and her work was very remunerative.

In July, 1872, Johnson joined a press party going across the United States. In this way, she became connected with many new papers, the Prairie Farmer of Chicago, the Horticulturist, Hearth and Home, Independent and Tribune of New York City, and the Saturday Evening Journal, of Philadelphia. For the Prairie Farmer, she wrote a serial, "Letters of Sophie Homespun", and for the Country Gentleman, "Horace and I". The year after her return from San Francisco, she earned US$1,200 through her writing, which was of great help in educating her children. In 1873, she joined another press party, visiting the Mammoth Cave and Pike's Peak, and in 1889, she again visited Colorado. She wrote thousands of newspaper articles, and her published books are Every Woman Her Own Flower Gardener, A Manual of Etiquette (Putnam's), and Household Hints and Recipes. She wrote nearly half of Window Gardening, edited by Henry T. Williams. She also wrote as "Cousin Daisy" and "Mrs. S. O. Johnson".

After her husband's death in 1887, Johnson made Bath her summer home. Her health had been failing rapidly for six months before she died at the home of her son-in-law, N. R. Haverland, M.D., in Holliston, Massachusetts, October 26, 1899.

== Selected works ==
- A Manual of Etiquette, 1868
- Every Woman Her Own Flower Gardener, 1871
- Household Hints and Recipes, 1877
- The New York Fashion Bazar Book of Etiquette, 1887
