= Entrée =

Dish served before the main course

An entrée (/ˈɒ̃treɪ/, US also /ɒnˈtreɪ/; French: [ɑ̃tʁe]), in modern French table service and that of much of the English-speaking world, is a dish served before the main course of a meal. Outside North America, it is generally synonymous with the terms hors d'oeuvre, appetiser, or starter. It may be the first dish served, or it may follow a soup or other small dish or dishes.

In the United States and parts of English-speaking Canada, the term entrée instead refers to the main course or the only course of a meal. (Note: "entrée". Trésor de la langue française informatisé (in French).; "entrée". Oxford English Dictionary (online ed.). Oxford University Press. doi:10.1093/OED/2174380319. (Subscription or participating institution membership required.))

== Early use of the term ==
The word entrée as a culinary term first appears in print around 1536 in a collection of menus (Note: The word "menus" appropriately describes this section of the Petit traicté, but the first appearance of "menu" with that culinary meaning is in the much later Nouveau Dictionnaire de l'Académie françoise, 1718, p. II:50.) at the end of the Petit traicté auquel verrez la maniere de faire cuisine, more widely known from a later edition titled Livre fort excellent de cuisine (Note: The Petit traicté was published by Pierre Sargent in Paris between 1534 and 1536. Philip and Mary Hyman have identified 27 editions of this book published between 1536 and 1627, under numerous titles, including the Livre fort excellent de cuisine.). There, the first stage of each meal is called the entree de table (entrance to the table); the second stage consists of potaiges (foods boiled or simmered "in pots"); the third consists of one or more services de rost (meat or fowl "roasted" in dry heat); and the last is the issue de table (departure from the table). These four stages of the meal appear consistently in this order in all the books that derive from the Petit traicté.

The terms entree de table and issue de table are organizing words, "describing the structure of a meal rather than the food itself". The terms potaiges and rost indicate cooking methods but not ingredients. The menus, though, give some idea of both the ingredients and the cooking methods that were characteristic of each stage of the meal.

Sausages, offal, and raw watery fruits (oranges, plums, peaches, apricots, and grapes) were apparently considered uniquely appropriate for starting the meal, as those foods appear only in the entree de table. (Note: Raw "dry" fruits (apples, pears, and medlars) are characteristic of the issue de table in the Petit traicté.) Other dishes considered appropriate for the entree stage also appear in later stages of the meal, such as venison cooked in various ways (in the entree, potaiges, and rost services) and savory pies and sauced meats (in the entree and rost services). The distribution of dishes is very similar to that of the menus in the Ménagier de Paris, written 150 years before the Petit traicté. (Note: In the menus of the Ménagier, sausages and raw watery fruits are characteristic of the "premiere assiette" served at the start of the meal, either before the potages and sauced meats or, sometimes, alongside them in a large first service. Roasted meats, fowl, game, and additional potages follow, presented in a single service or, more often, in several separate services. The meal is concluded with wafers, dried and preserved fruits, and spiced wine.)

== The entrée in the "Classical Order" of table service ==
The stages of the meal underwent several significant changes between the mid-16th and mid-17th century. Notably, by 1650, potage had become the first stage of the meal and the entrée had become the second stage, followed by the roast, entremets, and dessert. The term "entrée" thus lost its literal meaning. Over time, the term also came to refer to the dishes served in the entrée stage, and not just to the stage itself.

While cookbooks and dictionaries of the 17th and 18th centuries rarely discuss the type of dishes appropriate to each stage of the meal with any specificity, entrées and the dishes of the other stages of the meal can be distinguished from each other by certain characteristics, such as their ingredients, cooking methods, and serving temperatures. The distinct characteristics of the entrée were at first loosely observed, or perhaps more accurately, the "rules" were in a formative stage for several decades. By the early 18th century, though, certain ingredients and cooking methods were increasingly confined to the entrée stage of the meal.

In the 17th, 18th, and 19th centuries, entrées on meat days (Note: In accordance with church regulations in force from the Middle Ages to the 19th century, the ingredients for every stage of the meal varied between "meat days" (jours gras, literally "fat days"), when all foods were allowed, and "lean days" (jours maigres), when the church forbade consumption of meat and fowl but not fish. Until the 16th century, white meats (milk, cream, butter, and cheese) and eggs were additionally forbidden in Lent. Beginning in the 17th century, white meats were allowed in Lent. Beginning in the 19th century, eggs were also allowed in Lent.) included butchers' meats (but not ham), suckling pig, fowl, furred and feathered game, and offal. Eggs were never served as entrées on meat days; they were served only as entremets. Vegetables often made up part of the sauce or garnish, but entrées on meat days were always meat dishes; separate dishes of vegetables were served only as entremets.

On lean days, fish replaced meat and fowl in every stage of the meal. Entrées included a wide range of fish, shellfish, crustaceans, turtles, and frogs. Entrées on lean days were rarely composed only of vegetables, except during Lent, when vegetable entrées ("entrées en racines", encompassing all vegetables, not just "roots") were sometimes served. Eggs were commonly served as entrées on lean days out of Lent; in Lent, eggs were never served at any meal.

Moist cooking methods were characteristic of the entrée stage of the meal, typical preparations being sautés, ragoûts, and fricassées. Meat or fowl (but not fish) might be roasted, but it was first wrapped in paper, or stuffed with a forcemeat, or barded with herbs or anchovies, or finished in a sauce, or prepared in some other way to keep the dish from browning and crisping like a true roast. Savory pies and pastries were baked in dry heat, but the enclosed meat cooked in its own steam and juices. Meat fritters and, on lean days, fish fritters were also served as entrées.

All entrées were served hot, which was a salient feature of entrées until the 19th century.

=== Large entrées ===
Large joints of meat (usually beef or veal) and large whole fowl (turkey and geese) were the grandes or grosses entrées of the meal. When roasted, whole joints and fowl were called "spit-roasted entrées" (entrées de broche), always served in a sauce or ragoût to distinguish them from true roasts.

=== Le Bouilli ===
When boiled, a joint of beef was "le bouilli", the first of the entrées consumed in the meal.

=== Relevés ===
In the late 18th century, the practice arose of removing the empty soup tureens and replacing them with entrées de broche or other grosses entrées. The replacement dishes were commonly called "relevés", or in English, "removes". They were the last of the entrées consumed at the meal, although they were brought to the table immediately after the potages.

=== Small entrées ===
The most numerous of the entrées at any meal were the "ordinary entrées" (entrées ordinaires), consumed after the bouilli and before other grosses entrées. In composition, they were distinguished from the grosses entrées by the small size of their ingredients, not the size of the dish itself. Small fowl could be served whole, but large fowl and large joints of meat were cut into pieces or fillets. Despite the designation "ordinary", these entrées were much more elaborate and refined than grosses entrées.

=== Hors d'œuvre ===
In the late 17th century, "hors d'œuvre" were served in both the entrée and entremets stages of the meal as little "extra" dishes, always served hot and always consumed as the last of the entrées or entremets.

== Changes in the 19th century ==
In the 19th century, hors d'œuvre became a distinct stage of the meal. They were no longer considered to be entrées or entremets, and, in a marked change from earlier practice, they were consumed immediately after the potage and before the other entrées. Over the course of the century, cold hors d'œuvre became increasingly common.

Relevés also became a distinct stage of the meal, often consumed before the other entrées rather than after them. Relevés came to include not just spit-roasted joints, but all large joints and bulky cuts of butchers' meats and whole fish cooked in any way. Entrées, in the new sense of the term, included less bulky foods, like sliced meats and fillets of fish, fowl cooked in any way other than roasting, foie gras, and pies and pastries of poultry and game.

Due at least in part to the collapse of the church's authority in France, rules governing meat and lean days were followed irregularly. In particular, fish was commonly served on meat days, and whole fish became a classic relevé. Some styles of service even included a "fish course".

After the 1820s, the bouilli was no longer routinely served at fine dinners, having been replaced by a wider variety of relevés. Also, in a marked change from earlier practices, cold entrées became increasingly common.

Over the course of the 19th century, entrées and relevés were sometimes considered to be the principal part of the meal.

== Changes in the 20th century ==
Distinctions between the various types of entrées (grosses, grandes, de broche, relevés) had largely fallen out of use by the end of the 19th century. Menus of the first half of the 20th century routinely include entrées but not relevés.

In France, the entrée slowly came to be associated primarily with its position in the meal rather than the composition of its dishes. Despite the objections of various food authorities who insisted on retaining the classical meaning of the word, the term entrée came to refer to the first course of the meal, a small dish that precedes the main course (plat principal) in a three-course meal. The "new" use of the term, now common almost worldwide, is a return to the literal meaning of the word and a partial return to the medieval arrangement of the meal.

In the United States and parts of English-speaking Canada, though, the older understanding of the entrée as a substantial meat course persisted, and the word came to refer to the principal dish of the meal. In the 21st century, the use of the word entrée in North American menus began to decline, being replaced by terms like "main course" or other terms appropriate to the culinary tradition of a given restaurant or cookbook.

== Notes, references, and sources ==
=== Sources ===
- Albala, Ken; Tomasik, Timothy, eds. (2014). The Most Excellent Book of Cookery, Livre fort excellent de cuysine. Totnes, Devon: Prospect Books. ISBN 978-1903018965.
- Blot, Pierre (1868). Hand-Book of Practical Cookery, for Ladies and Professional Cooks. New York: D. Appleton and Company.
- Brillat-Savarin, Jean Anthelme (1826). Physiologie du goût, ou Méditations de Gastronomie transcendante. Vol. 1. Paris: A. Sautelet et Cie.
- Dubois, Urbain (1856). Cuisine Classique. Vol. 2. Paris: Les Auteurs.
- "Entrée". Encyclopédie des gens du monde. Vol. 9.2. Paris: Treuttel et Würtz. 1837. p. 581.
- "Entrée". La Grande Encyclopédie. Vol. 15. Paris: H. Lamirault et Cie. 1885. p. 1183.
- Escoffier, Auguste (1907). A Guide to Modern Cookery. London: William Heinemann.
- Escoffier, Auguste (1912). Le Livre des menus. Paris: E. Grevin.
- Flandrin, Jean-Louis (2007) [2001]. Arranging the Meal: A History of Table Service in France [L'Ordre des mets]. Translated by Johnson, Julie E. Berkeley: University of California Press. ISBN 978-0520238855.
- Grimod de La Reynière, Alexandre-Balthazar-Laurent (1804). Almanach des Gourmands, seconde année. Paris: Maradan.
- Grimod de La Reynière, Alexandre-Balthazar-Laurent (1806). Almanach des Gourmands, quatrième année. Paris: Maradan.
- Hill, Janet McKenzie (1911). The Book of Entrées. Boston: Little, Brown and Company.
- Hyman, Philip; Hyman, Mary (1992). "Les livres de cuisine et le commerce des recettes en France aux 15e et 16e siècles". In Carole Lambert (ed.). Du manuscrit à la table. Paris, Montréal: Champion-Slatkin—Les Presses de l'Université de Montréal. ISBN 978-2852037076.
- Jurafsky, Dan (2014). The Language of Food. New York and London: W.W. Norton & Company. ISBN 978-0393240832.
- Montagné, Prosper (1938). Larousse Gastronomique. Paris: Librairie Larousse.
- Raskin, Xavier (1922). The French Chef in Private American Families. Chicago: Rand McNally & Company.
- Tomasik, Timothy J. (May 2016). "Cuisine by the Cut of One's Trousers: Cookbook Marketing in Early Modern France". Food and History. 14 (2–3): 223–247. doi:10.1484/J.FOOD.5.115341. ISSN 1780-3187.

== See also ==
- Full course dinner
- Food presentation
