= Jean-Louis Flandrin =

French historian

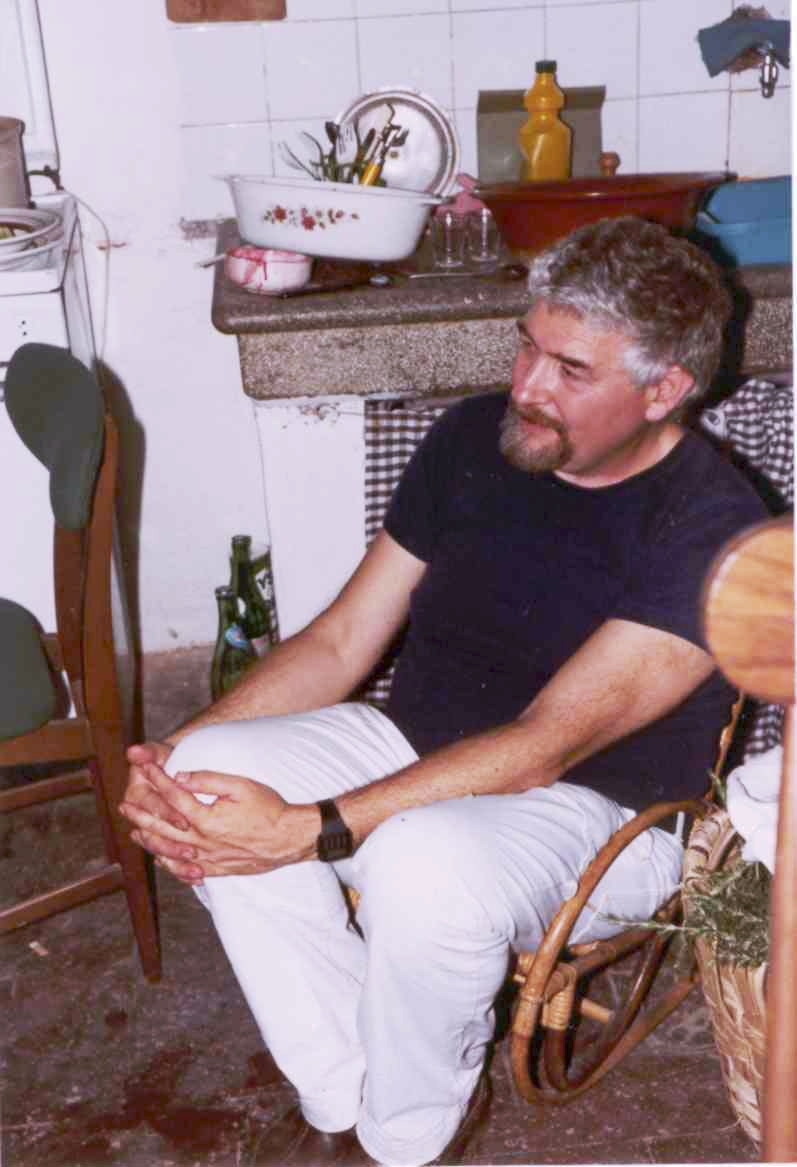
- Born: Jean-Louis Flandrin; July 4, 1931; Grenoble, France
- Died: August 8, 2001 (aged 70); Paris, France
- Education: Doctorat d'État (1979); Agrégation d'histoire (1956)
- Occupations: Historian, writer

Jean-Louis Flandrin (July 4, 1931 – August 8, 2001) was a French historian. His fields of study were family, sexuality, and, in particular, food. He introduced new analytical methods and examined a range of sources including church penitentials, cookbooks, and even traditional proverbs over a wide historical time-frame, from the High Middle Ages to the 20th century. At the time of his death, Flandrin was Professor Emeritus at the University of Paris VIII and Head of Research at the École des hautes études en sciences sociales.

== Works ==
- L’Église et le contrôle des naissances (1970), rééd. L’Église et la contraception (2006)
- Les Amours paysannes (xvie – xixe siècles) (1975)
- Familles: Parenté, maison, sexualité dans l'ancienne société (1976)
- Le Sexe et l'Occident: Évolution des attitudes et des comportements (1981)
- Un temps pour embrasser (1983)
- Histoire de l'alimentation (1996), ouvrage collectif de quarante signatures codirigé avec Massimo Montanari
- Tables d’hier, tables d’ailleurs
- Fêtes gourmandes au Moyen Âge, avec Carole Lambert (1998)
- Histoire et ethnologie du repas (1999)
- L’Ordre des mets (2002)

His personal papers are preserved at the Archives nationales under the document code 624AP.
