= Index of breakfast-related articles =

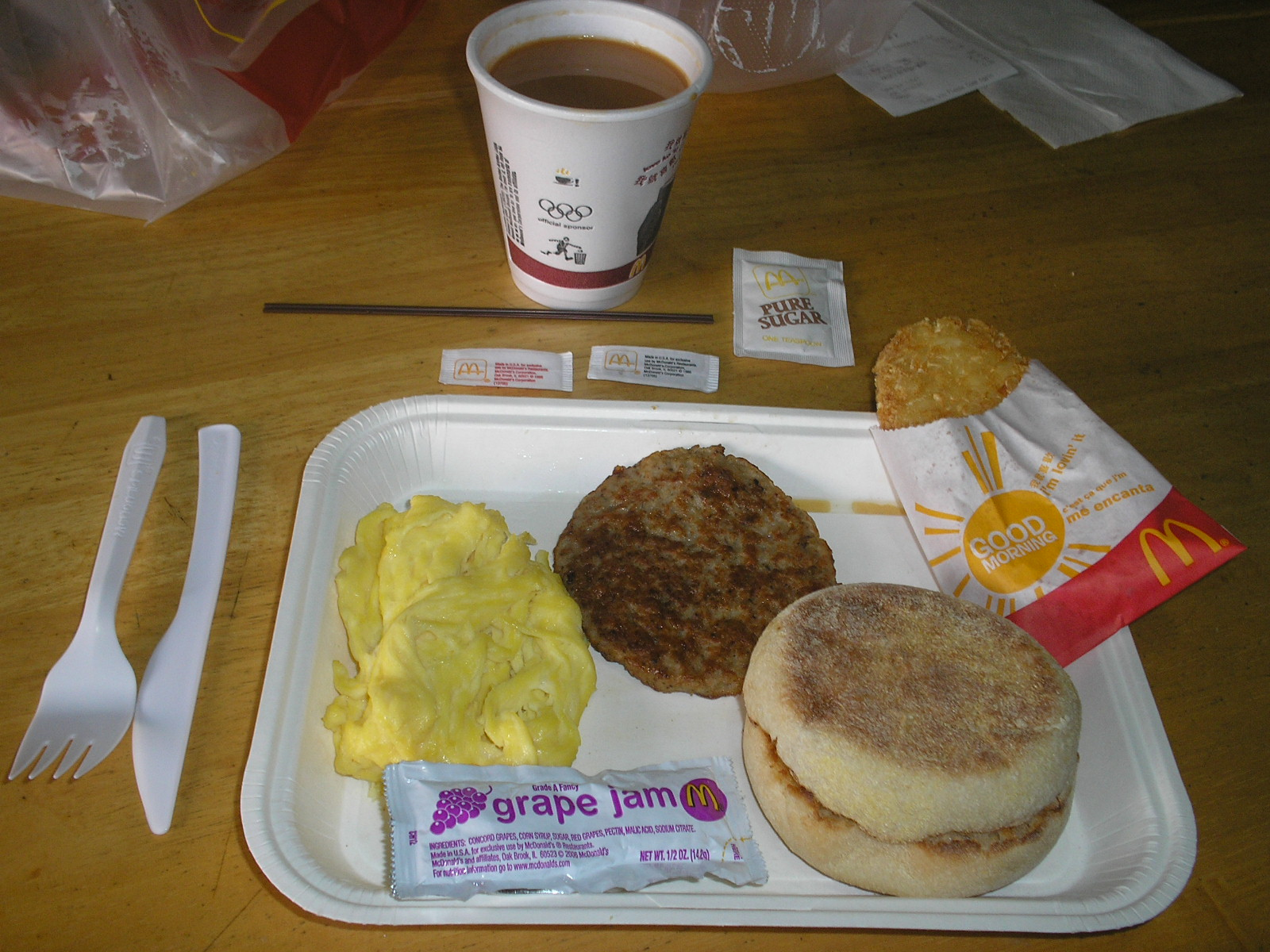
A "big breakfast" meal at McDonald's

This is an index of breakfast-related articles. Breakfast is the first meal taken after rising from a night's sleep, most often eaten in the early morning before undertaking the day's work. Among English speakers, "breakfast" can be used to refer to this meal, or to a meal composed of traditional breakfast foods (such as eggs, oatmeal and sausage) served at any time of day.

== B ==
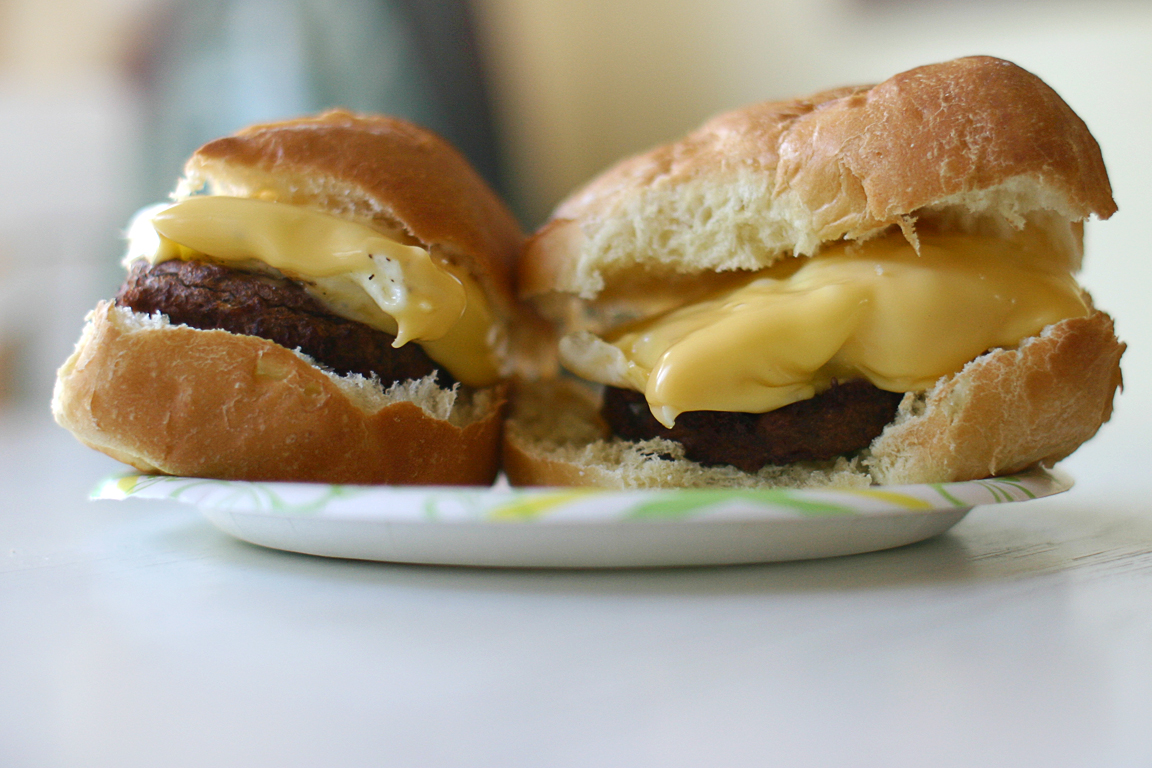
Breakfast rolls

- Bed and breakfast
- Beer soup
- Breakfast
- Breakfast cereal
- Breakfast roll
- Breakfast sausage
- Breakfast tea

- English breakfast tea
- Irish breakfast tea

- Brunch

== C ==
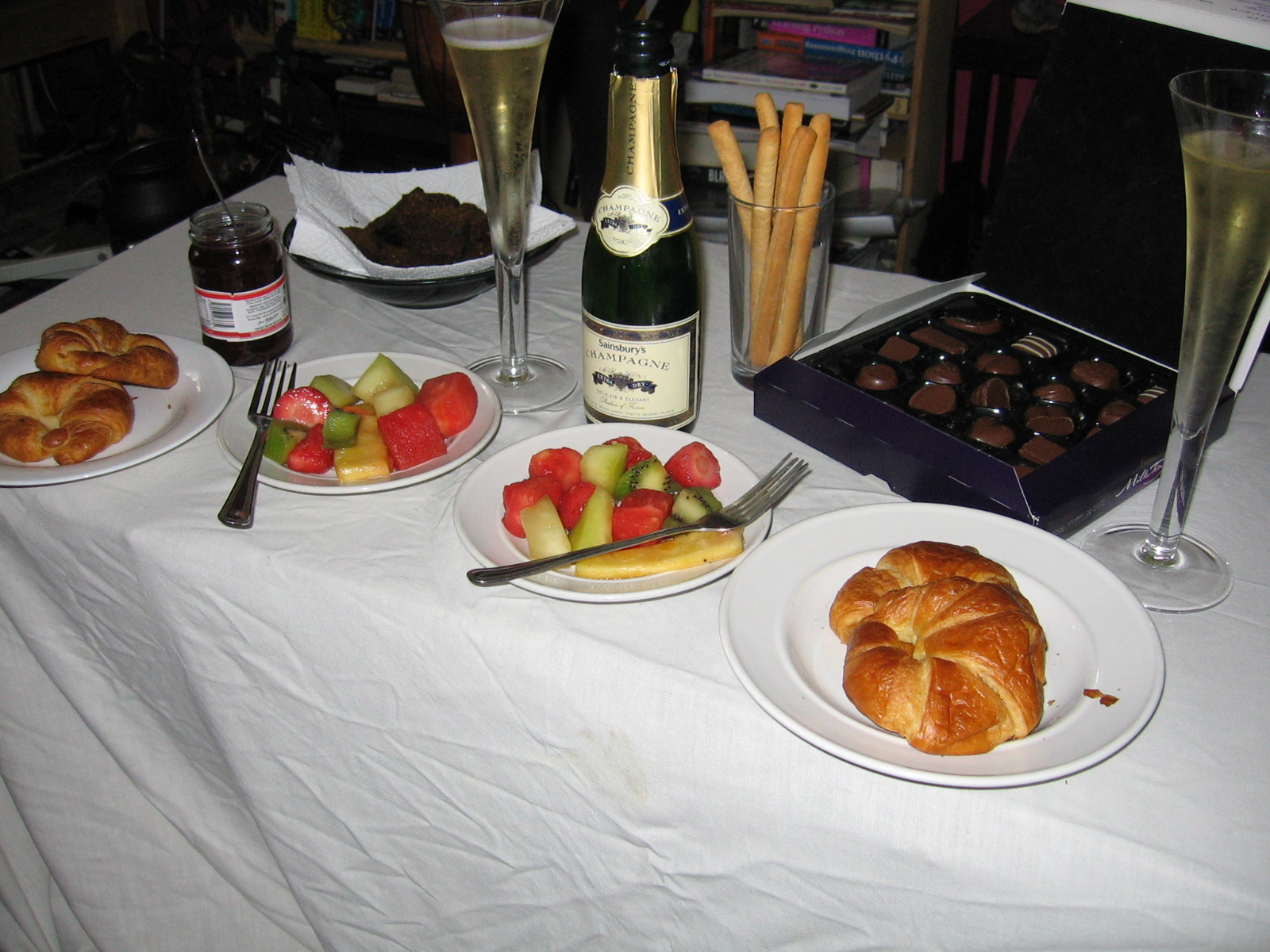
A champagne breakfast

- Champagne breakfast

== D ==
- Dim sum

== E ==
- Elevenses

== F ==
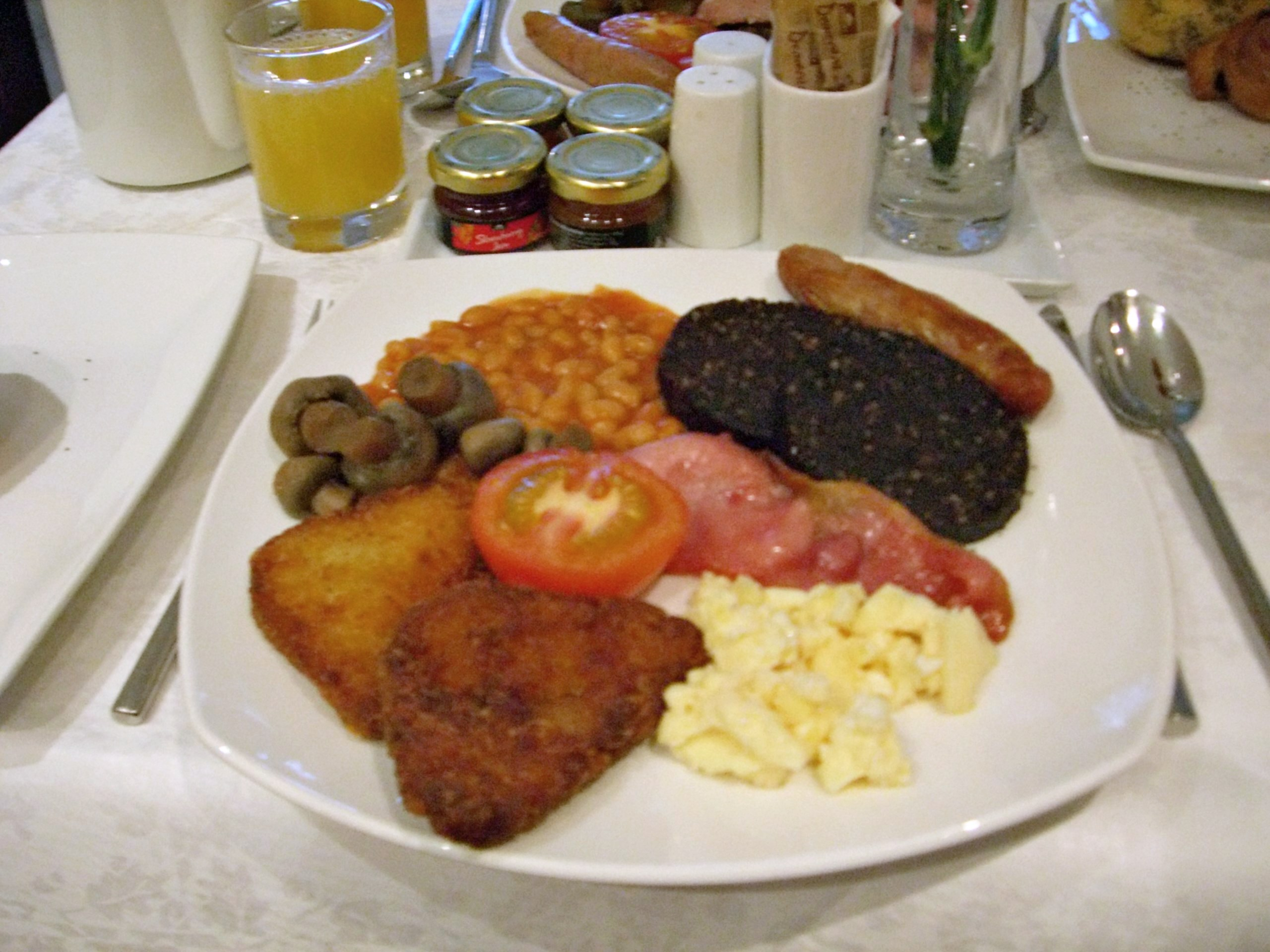
A full English breakfast with scrambled eggs, sausage, black pudding, bacon, mushrooms, baked beans, hash browns, and tomato

- Free Breakfast for Children
- Frühschoppen
- Full breakfast

== G ==
- General Mills monster-themed breakfast cereals

== H ==
- History of breakfast

== I ==
- Instant breakfast
- Israeli breakfast

== L ==
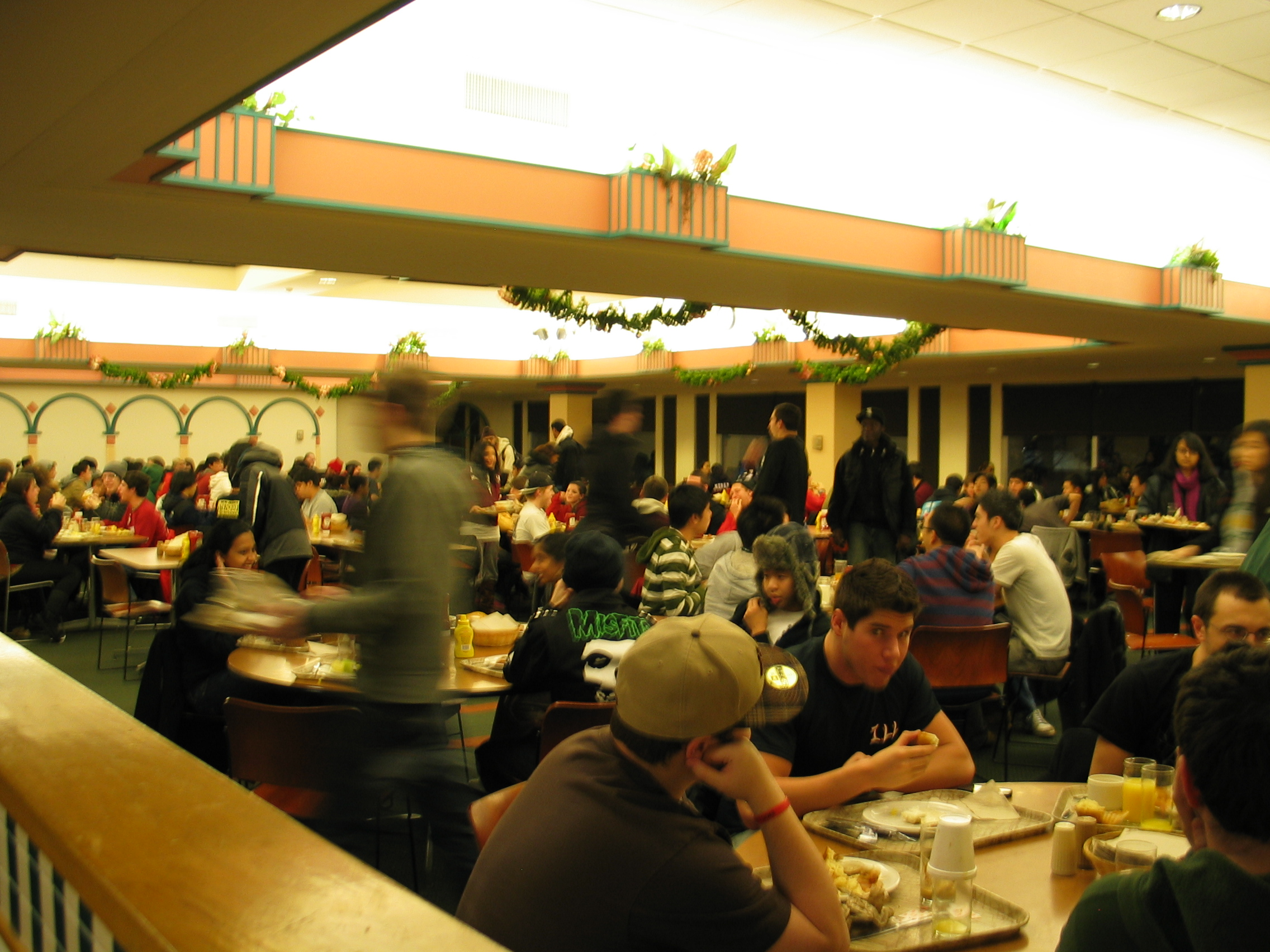
Students eating midnight breakfast at Tillett Dining Hall, Livingston Campus, Rutgers University

- List of breakfast beverages
- List of breakfast cereal advertising characters
- List of breakfast cereals
- List of breakfast foods

== M ==
- Midnight breakfast

== N ==
- North Melbourne Grand Final Breakfast
- NRL Grand Final Breakfast

== P ==
- Pancake house
  - List of pancake houses

== S ==
- School breakfast club
- Second breakfast
- Suhoor

== T ==
- Turkish breakfast

== W ==
- Wedding breakfast

== Y ==
- Yum cha

== See also ==
- Breakfast by country
- Breakfast television
- List of brunch foods
