= Wedding banquet =

Wedding banquet may refer to:

- The Wedding Banquet, a 1993 Taiwanese-American film
- The Wedding Banquet, a 2025 American remake of the 1993 film
- the actual banquet (meal) at a wedding. This may include:
  - rehearsal dinner, a pre-wedding ceremony in North American tradition
  - wedding breakfast, in English tradition
  - wedding reception, a party held after the completion of a marriage ceremony
