= Grand final =

Final match of a championship which determines the ultimate winner

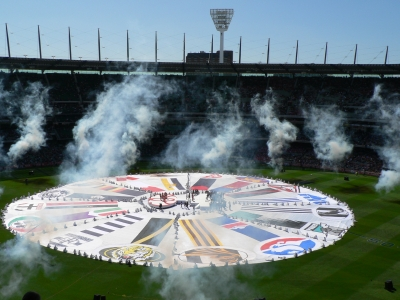
Part of the pre-match celebrations at the 2006 Australian Football League Grand Final, (Sydney vs West Coast) unfurling of the banners of every club in the competition

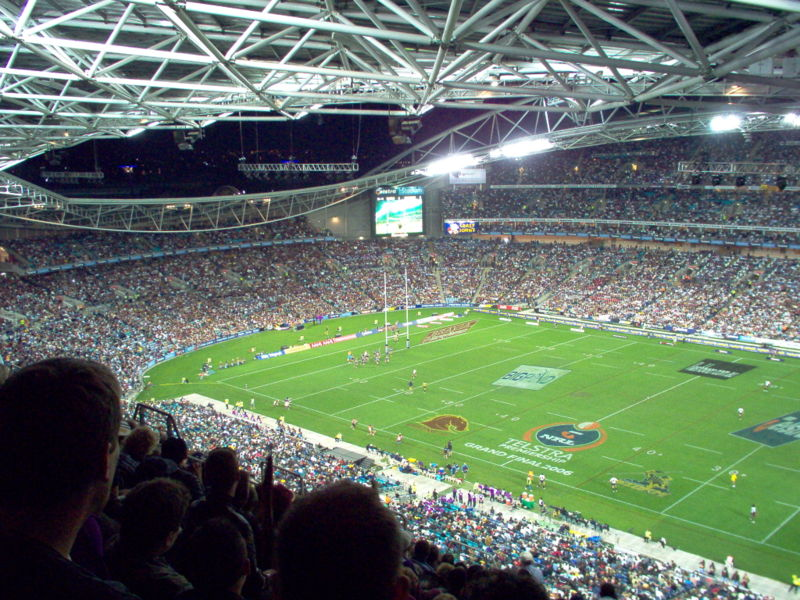
2006 National Rugby League Grand Final (Brisbane Broncos vs Melbourne Storm)

Primarily in Australian sports, a grand final is a game that decides a sports league's premiership (or championship) winning team, i.e. the conclusive game of a finals (or play-off) series. Synonymous with a championship game in North American sports, grand finals have become a significant part of Australian culture. The earliest leagues to feature a grand final were in Australian rules football, followed soon after by rugby league. Currently the largest grand finals are in the Australian Football League (AFL) and National Rugby League (NRL). Their popularity influenced other competitions such as soccer's A-League Men and A-League Women, the National Basketball League, Super Netball and European rugby league's Super League to adopt grand finals as well. Most grand finals involve a prestigious award for the player voted best on field.

== History ==
The Anglo-Norman term "grand" to describe a sporting event, documented in England as "grand match" in 1836, was used in Australia from the 1850s. A steeplechase in England has been called the "Grand National Steeple Chase" ("Grand National" alone for short) since at least 1839.

Use of the term in Australian Football dates back to the first organised and widely publicised match between Melbourne Grammar School and Scotch College on 7 August 1858 at Yarra Park (formerly Richmond Park). The game was advertised as the "grand football match" in the Melbourne Morning Herald and several other local newspapers.

In 1859, a "grand football match" was advertised in Richmond, Tasmania for St Patrick's Day on Friday 18 March.

In The Argus of 1861, the Royal Caledonian Society of Melbourne invited clubs to compete in a "grand football-match" which was to be football's first ever trophy, the Caledonian Challenge Cup, however the match did not proceed until the following year.

The earliest known event described as "grand" in Sydney was a cricket match in 1862.

In the 1871 South Yarra Challenge Cup, Carlton and Melbourne drew their three matches, but both clubs had won their remaining matches against the other clubs, Albert Park and South Yarra, meaning the Challenge Cup's only tiebreaker, head-to-head record, was unable to separate them. Both teams' captains and the Cup organisers subsequently arranged a "grand match" (as advertised in The Argus) at Albert Park to decide the premiership and permanent and undisputed ownership of the Challenge Cup on October 7, a week after the season had finished: Carlton won the match by two goals to nil.

Initially, a football premiership final appeared to be called a "grand final" only when the losers of a final were the minor premiers and they exercised the "right to challenge" the winners to a second premiership decider.

=== Victorian Football Association ===
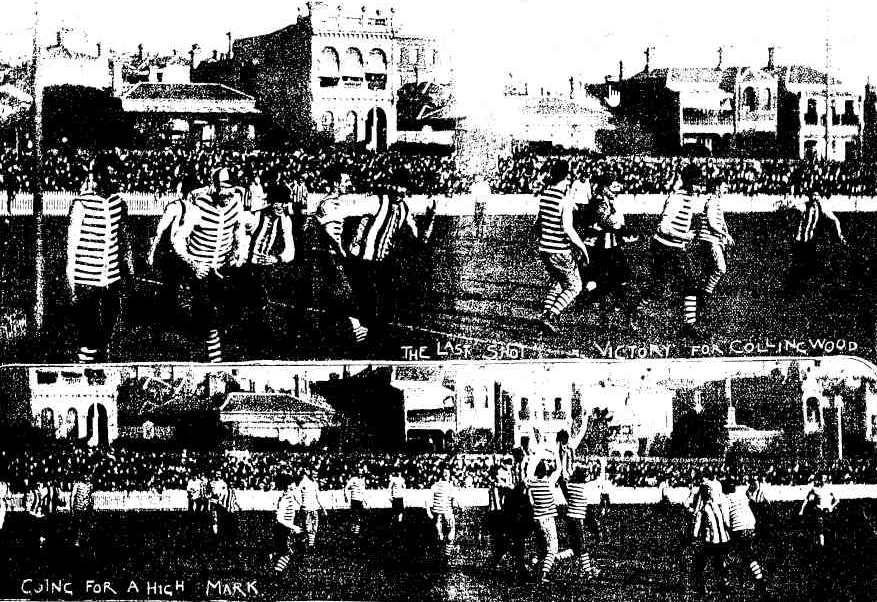
Action from the 1896 VFA Grand Final

In the Victorian Football Association, which was Victoria's top level of senior football from 1877 until 1896, the premiership was typically awarded solely on the basis of the rostered premiership matches (known today as the home-and-away season). However, the VFA's rules stipulated that where two or more teams finished equal on premiership points, a playoff match or matches would be scheduled amongst those teams to decide the premiership.

This was required in 1896, when South Melbourne and Collingwood finished level on top of the ladder with records of 14 wins and one draw. The playoff match between them, which is retrospectively treated as Victoria's first Grand Final (it was actually the first match referred to as such), saw Collingwood defeat South Melbourne by 6.9 – 5.10 to win the club's first ever premiership.

There had been one previous premiership playoff match during this time in the VFA, between Melbourne and Geelong in 1878, but this match did not break a tie for first place, as Geelong had a superior win–loss record to Melbourne: the match was organised to resolve a dispute between the two clubs. Geelong defeated Melbourne by 5.12 – 1.4 to win the premiership.

=== Victorian Football League and Australian Football League ===
In 1897, when eight teams broke away from the VFA to form the VFL, the concept of finals football was high on the agenda, with teams buoyed by the success and attendance from the 1896 Grand Final. Over the following ten years, all top-level Australian football leagues adopted a finals structure.

In 1931, the VFL adopted a system, the Page–McIntyre system, which ensured a Grand Final, and the concept became entrenched.

=== South Australian Football Association ===
Prior to 1889, the South Australian Football Association (SAFA, now SANFL) premiership was awarded to the team that finished top of the end-of-season ladder placings.

In 1889, Norwood and Port Adelaide finished equal first with 14 wins and one draw, meaning a play-off was required to determine the premiership. In promoting the play-off, the local press referred to it as a "premiership match". This was played on October 5, and Norwood won the match 7.4 to 5.9.

In 1894, Norwood and South Adelaide finished with a 13–5 record from their 18 matches. The play-off match was fixed for October 6, and despite a provision for 20 minute periods of extra time in the event of a draw at full time, the match was abandoned due to darkness with the scores level at 4.8 apiece.

The SAFA fixed a replay for October 10, Labor Day: this was the first of seven grand final replays in elite Australian football history. Norwood won the replay 4.7 to South Adelaide 3.5, with Anthony "Bos" Daly kicking the winning goal as the final bell rang.

=== New South Wales Rugby Football League ===
The New South Wales Rugby Football League (NSWRFL) experimented with a finals system in 1908, its inaugural year, but abandoned it the following season. Finals were reintroduced in 1926, and the premiership decider appeared to only be called a "grand final" if it involved the minor premiers.

By the 1930s, the NSWRFL adopted the term "grand final" to describe the premiership decider. Up until 1954 a 'grand final' match was only held if the minor premiers were beaten. The adoption of the VFL's Page–McIntyre system for the 1954 NSWRFL season meant for the first time grand finals would become necessary every season, so the term grand final has become used to describe all premiership deciders.

The tradition is maintained by the present-day NRL National Rugby League.

=== Europe ===
The term "Grand Final" was introduced to Europe in 1995 in a completely different sport—golf. In that year, the Challenge Tour, the official developmental tour for the European Tour, launched its season-ending Challenge Tour Grand Final. British rugby league would adopt the term in 1998, two years after the start of Super League. The Super League Grand Final has now become an accepted part of the British scene, and the term 'grand final' is used to describe the final of leagues below Super League as well, such as the Championship, Championship 1 and the Conference. Prior to this, a Championship Final was introduced to determine the winner of the British Rugby Football League Championship in 1904, though it only became a regular fixture from 1906 onwards. In 1973, the competition format was changed so that the championship was won by the team finishing top of the league table, with an end of season knock-out competition for the top teams that became known as the Premiership being created.

Starting in 2009–10, the rugby union competition historically known as the Celtic League, at the time involving teams from Ireland, Scotland and Wales, introduced a playoff system to determine its champion. (Although the league conducted a knockout competition in its early years, it was a parallel cup competition instead of a championship tournament.) The final match was branded as a grand final. This usage continued for the 2010–11 season, the first that included teams from Italy. Starting with the 2011–12 season, the league's first as Pro12, the "Grand Final" terminology was scrapped; the final match of the competition now known as the United Rugby Championship is simply called the "Final".

=== Philippines ===
In the Philippines, the term "grand finals" (pluralized) usually refer to a final of TV series competition. Notable series that had a "grand finals" are The Voice of the Philippines and Idol Philippines. It was used as early as 1994 for the Battle of the Brains quiz show.

== List of current notable competitions with grand finals ==
=== Sport ===
League (Region)	Sport	Event	Year first used	Record Attendance
Super League (Europe)	Rugby league	Super League Grand Final	1998	73,512
Women's Super League (Europe)	Women's rugby league	RFL Women's Super League Grand Final	2017	
National Rugby League (Australasia)	Rugby league	NRL Grand Final	1930 (1908 if Minor Premiers were challenged)	107,999
NRL Women's Premiership (Australasia)	Women's rugby league	NRL Women's Grand Final	2018	
Super Rugby	Rugby union	Super Rugby Grand Final	1996	62,567
Super W	Women's rugby union	Super W Grand Final	2018	
Victorian/Australian Football League (Australia)	Australian football	AFL Grand Final	1898	121,696
AFL Women's (Australia)	Women's Australian rules football	AFL Women's Grand Final	2017	53,034
National Basketball League (Australasia)	Basketball	NBL Championship	1979	15,064
Women's National Basketball League (Australia)	Women's basketball	WNBL Grand Final	1981	
A-League Men (Australasia)	Association football	A-League Men Grand Final	2004	56,371
A-League Women (Australasia)	Women's association football	A-League Women Grand Final	2009	6,127
South Australian National Football League (Australia)	Australian football	SANFL Grand Final	1889	66,897
Victorian Football Association/League (Australia)	Australian football	VFL Grand Final	1896 (1878 was the first to have one. But there was no other grand final until 1896)	23,816
West Australian Football League (Australia)	Australian football	WAFL Grand Final	1904	52,781
Celtic League (Europe)	Rugby union	Magners League Grand Final	2010; term abandoned in 2012	44,558
Super Netball (Australia)	Netball	Suncorp Super Netball grand final	2016	8,999
Challenge Tour (Europe)	Golf	Challenge Tour Grand Final	1995	
Australian Ice Hockey League (Australia)	Ice hockey	AIHL Grand Final	2000	
Indian Premier League(India)	Cricket	IPL Final	2008	
Rocket League Championship Series	Rocket League e-sports	RLCS Grand Finals	2016	
Overwatch League	Overwatch e-sports	Overwatch League Grand Finals	2018	
Hockey One (Australia)	Field hockey	Hockey One Grand Final	2019	

== Grand Finals in television ==
The Grand Finals are also adopted in numerous reality television and even game shows. In reality television, a number of selected finalists after surviving a pre-determined number of elimination rounds moved on to compete in the finals. Some shows, such as the earlier seasons of The Voice (notably the first two American seasons) and Project SuperStar, adopted a group-type format with an equal number of finalists from each group eliminated and advancing each show until one such finalist remain, at this point these finalists compete head-to-head for the champion. Taiwanese show One Million Star (and its sequel successor Chinese Million Star) uses a cumulative point system and the scores are progressively added until at one point the contestant with a lower score is eliminated; in the final round, these scores are converted as a percent weightage and the champion is decided based on the weighed scores.

In game shows, notably Jeopardy! (such as Tournament of Champions and The Greatest of All Time), these finalists compete in a two-legged round, based on the combined scores from both games, to determine the winner. From 1996 to 1998, Wheel of Fortune have a Friday Finals system where the three top-scoring contestants from the first four episodes that week returned again on a Friday for one more game; the winner in that episode will play for an extra prize package (in addition to the current prize the contestant chose) during the bonus round.

== Grand final replays ==
A grand final replay is a method of deciding the winner of a competition when a grand final is drawn by replaying the entire match the following week, rather than playing overtime or extra time on the same day. It is commonly used in Australian rules football and most notably in the Australian Football League, where it was used three times, the last occasion being in 2010.

The AFL decided in 2016 that grand final replays would be abolished being replaced with extra time: no grand final has required extra time as of 2025.

== Grand final breakfast ==
Most sports leagues in Australia have a grand final breakfast to mark the beginning to grand final day. It is a social highlight on the Australian sporting calendar. Watching the event is a ritual for many footy fans and the function plays a huge role in the pre-match build-up for the grand final. The North Melbourne Football Club host the North Melbourne Grand Final Breakfast, while the National Rugby League typically host the NRL Grand Final Breakfast at Sydney Convention and Exhibition Centre in Darling Harbour.

== See also ==
- Argus finals system
- McIntyre system
- Final

== Footnotes ==
- Ross, J. (ed), 100 Years of Australian Football 1897–1996: The Complete Story of the AFL, All the Big Stories, All the Great Pictures, All the Champions, Every AFL Season Reported, Viking, (Ringwood), 1996. ISBN 0-670-86814-0
