= List of brunch foods =

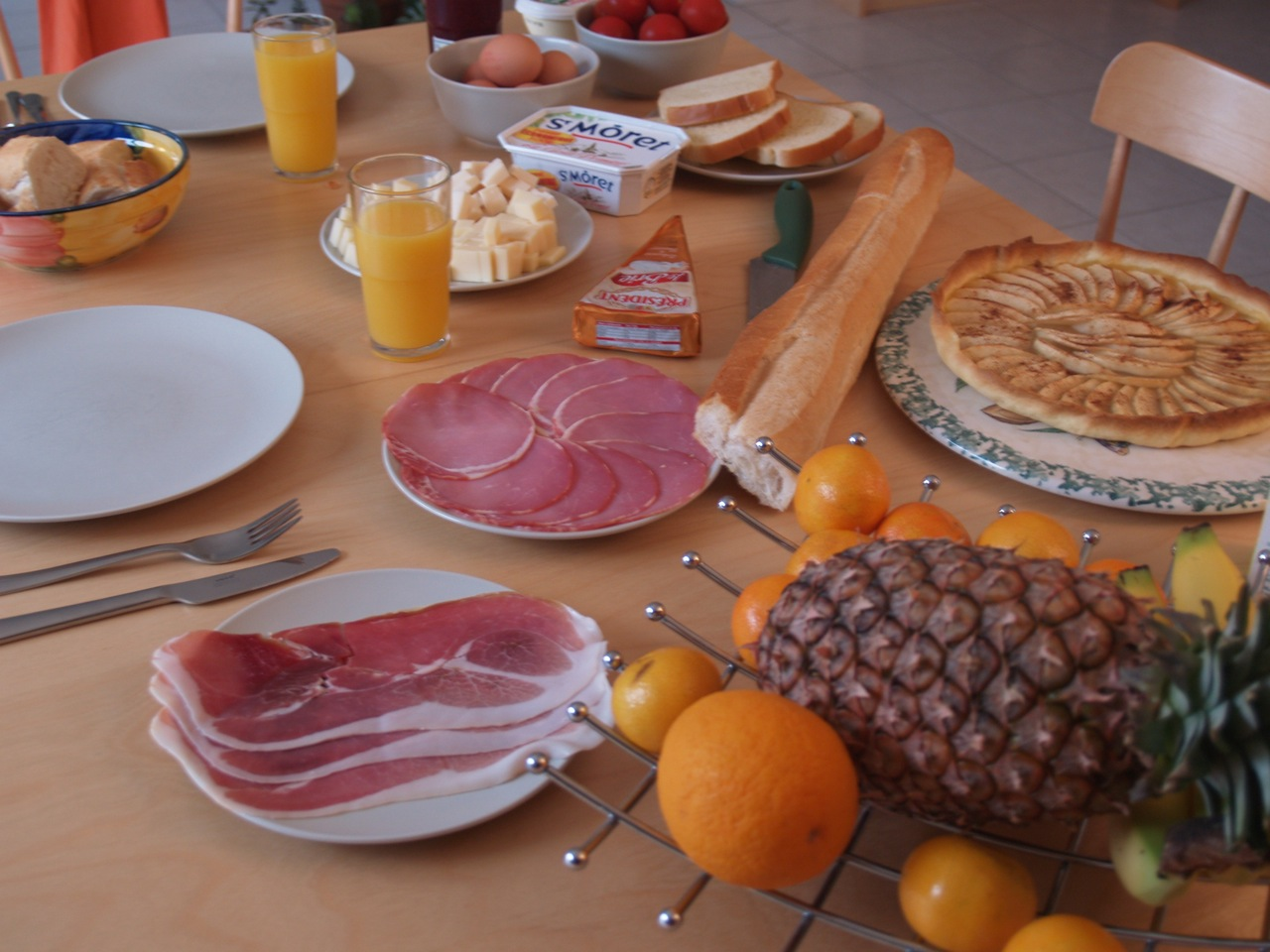
Assorted brunch foods

This is a list of brunch foods and dishes. Brunch is a combination of breakfast and lunch eaten usually during the late morning. Brunch originated in England in the late 1800s, served in a buffet style manner, and became popular in the United States in the 1930s. Brunch is also served in cafes and restaurants across the world.

== Brunch foods and dishes ==
The following foods are often served for brunch.

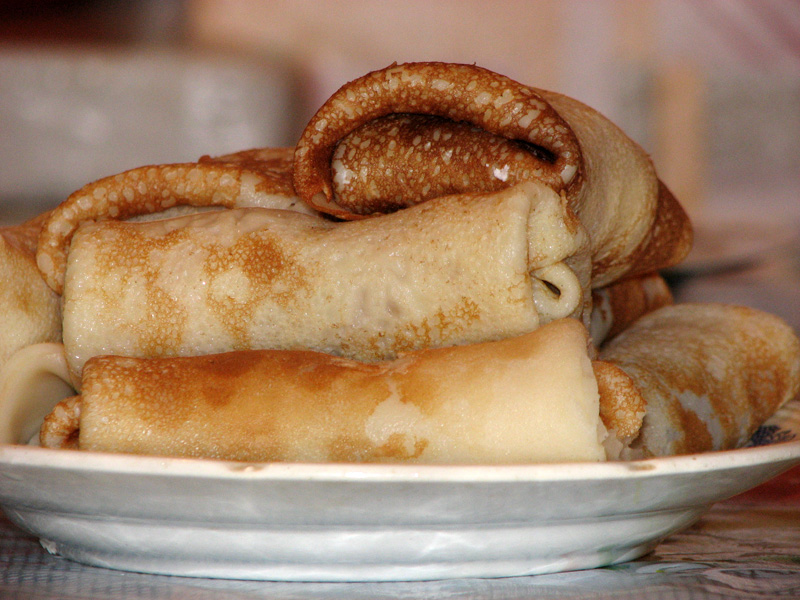
Blintzes

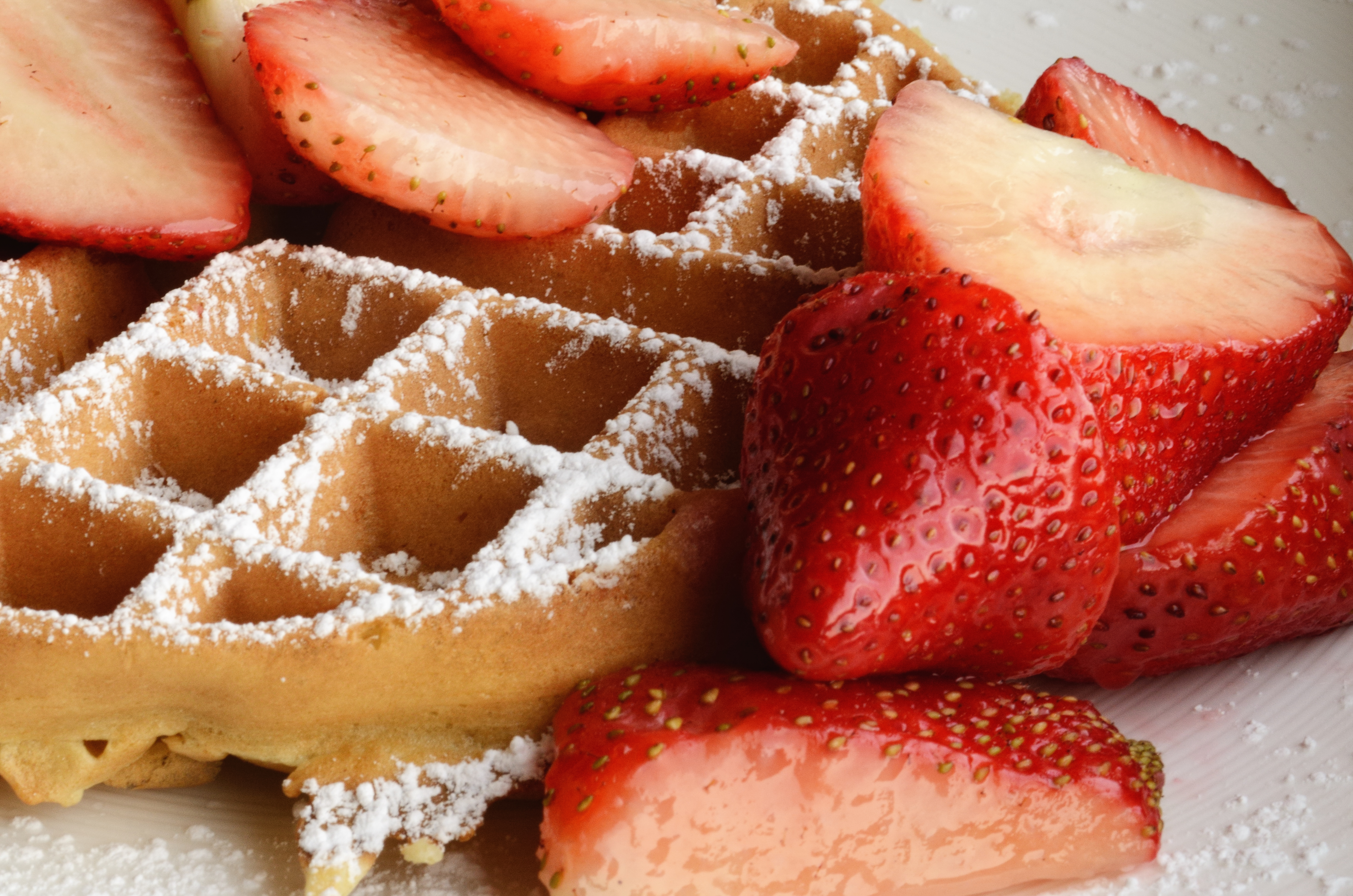
A Belgian waffle with strawberries and powdered sugar

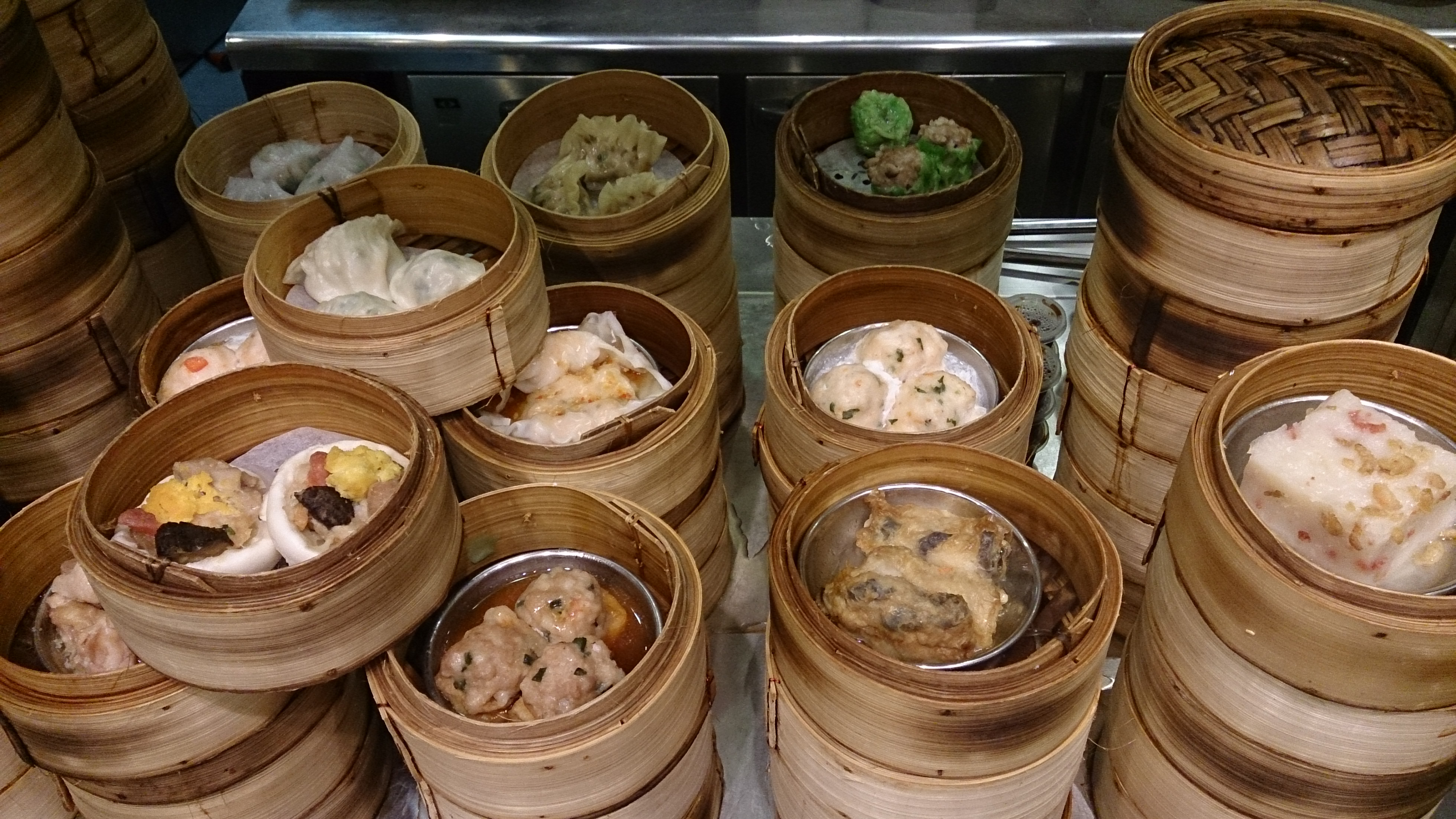
Dim sum

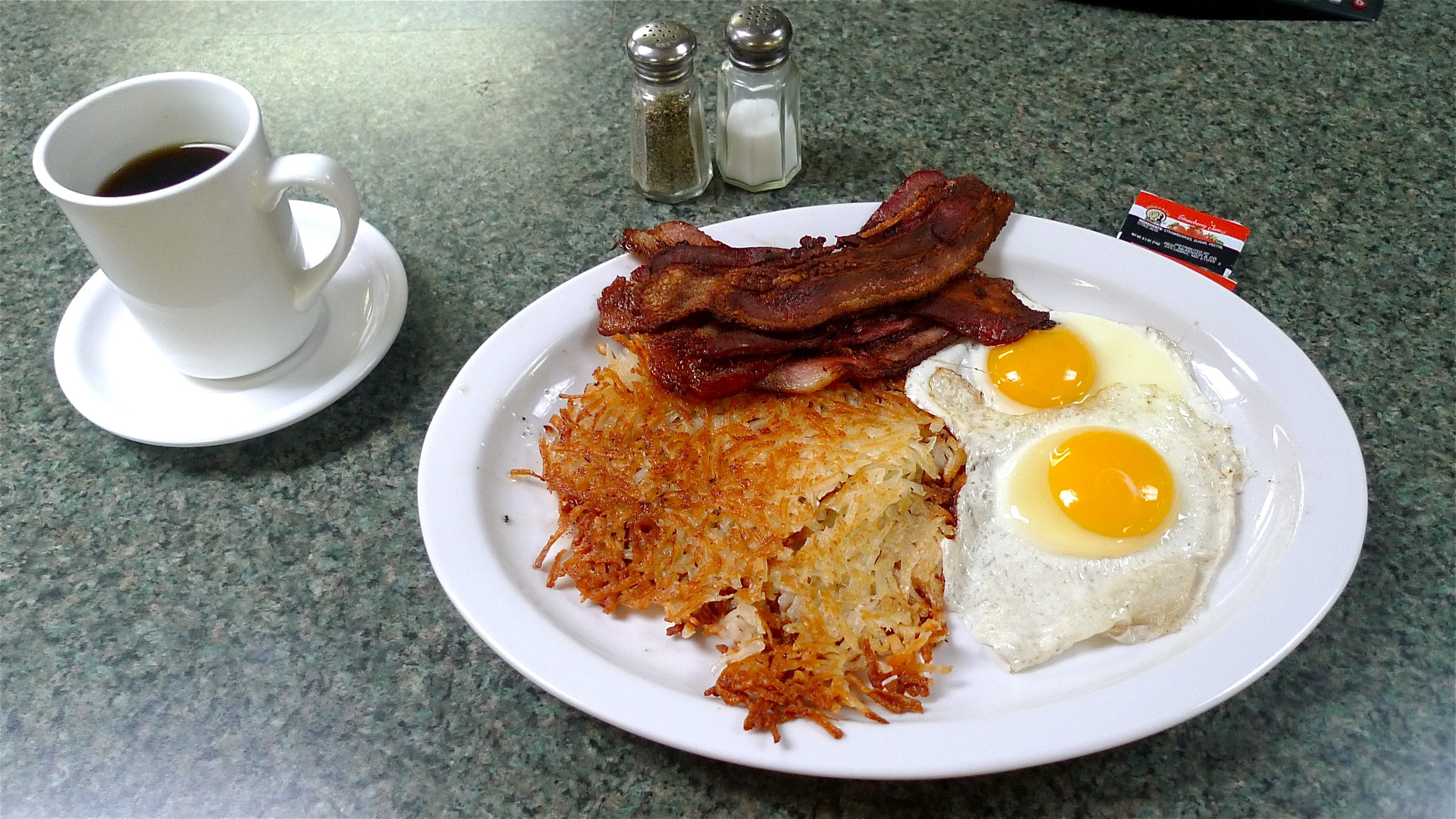
Hash browns, bacon, eggs and coffee

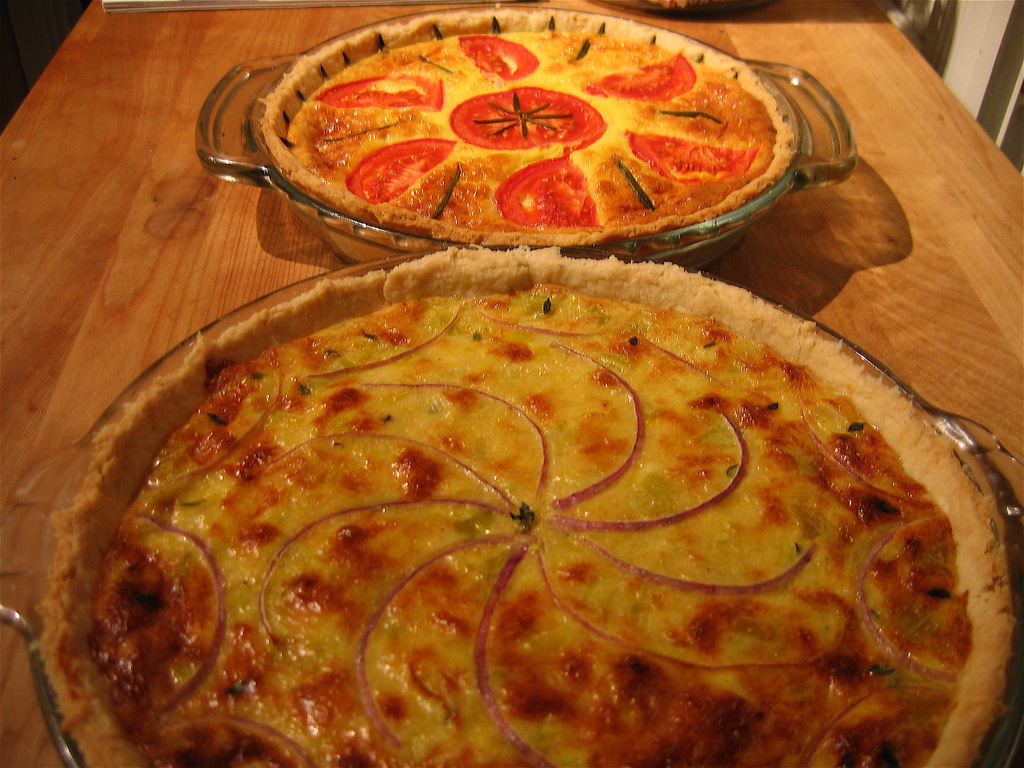
Brunch quiche

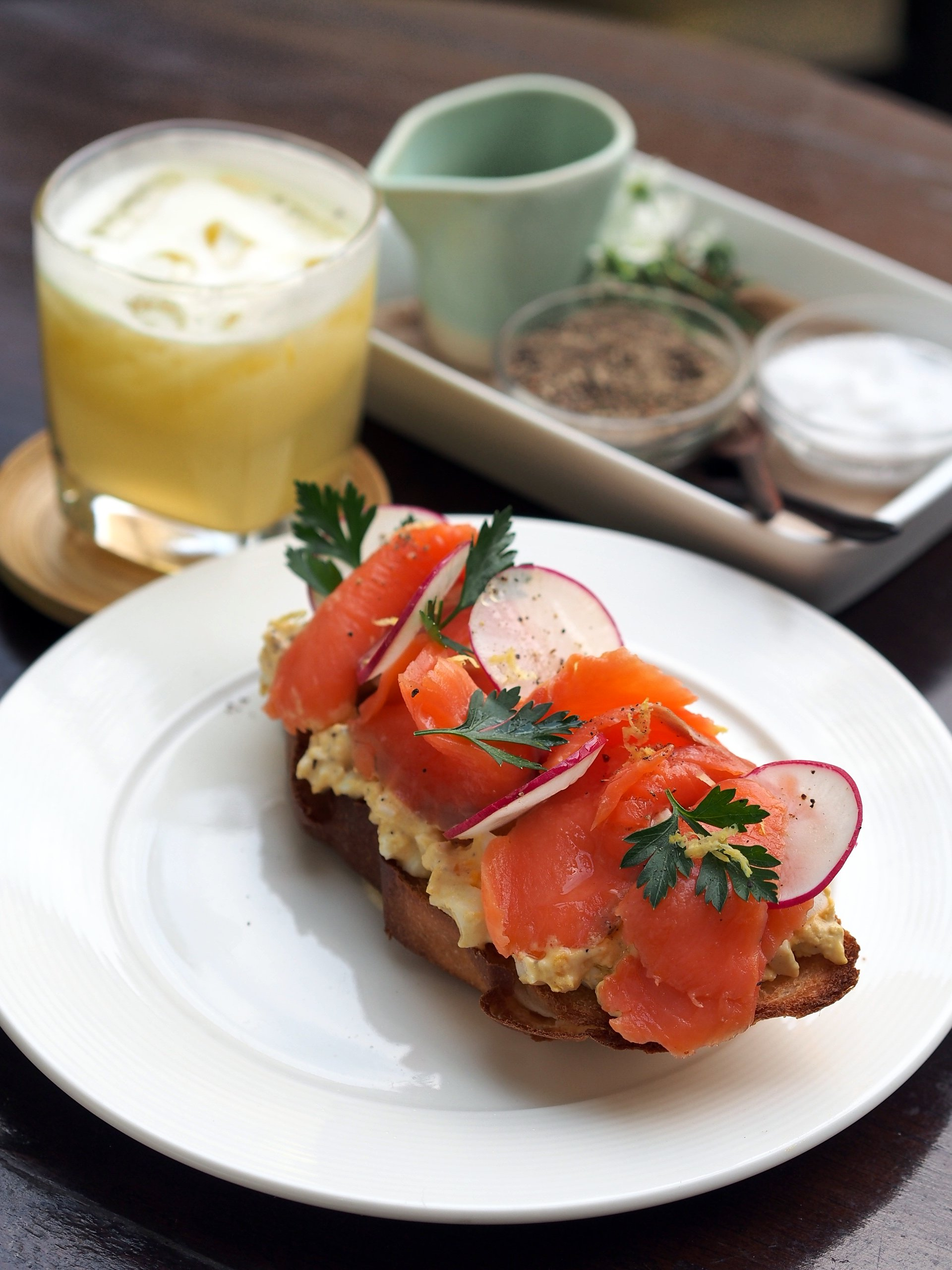
Smoked salmon and egg salad on a toasted baguette

- Açaí na tigela
- Avocado toast
- Bacon
- Bagel – in New York City, the "bagel brunch" was popular circa 1900. The bagel brunch consists of a bagel topped with lox, cream cheese, capers, tomato and red onion.
- Bagel and cream cheese
- Biscuits and gravy
- Blintz
- Bread and toast with butter and jams
- Breakfast sausage
- Brunch casserole – a simple casserole prepared with bread, eggs and bacon
- Cheese
- Chilaquiles
- Cinnamon rolls
- Coffee cake
- Cold cuts
- Crêpe
- Croissant
- David Eyre's pancake
- Dim sum
- Dutch baby pancake
- Egg dishes
  - Eggs Benedict
  - Eggs bourguignon (Oeufs en meurette)
  - Eggs Neptune
  - Eggs Sardou
  - Fried egg
  - Huevos rancheros
  - Omelette
  - Poached egg
  - Scrambled eggs
- English muffin (in a variety of configurations)
- French toast
- Frittata
- Fruit
- Grillades – a common brunch dish in the U.S. state of Louisiana
- Grits – a staple food for breakfast and brunch in the Southern United States
- Ham
- Hash – such as corned beef hash
- Hash browns
- Meeshay
- Muesli
- Muffins
- Oysters Rockefeller
- Pancake
- Pastry
- Potato
- Potato pancake
- Potatoes O'Brien
- Quiche
- Quick bread
- Roasted meats
- Salads
  - Caesar salad
  - Cobb salad
- Poached salmon – may be served cold
- Seafood
- Smoked fish
- Smoked salmon
- Soufflé
- Soups
- Steak and eggs
- Strata
- Tartines
- Teacake
- Tea sandwich
- Terrine
- Touton
- Tunisian tajine
- Waffle

=== Gallery ===
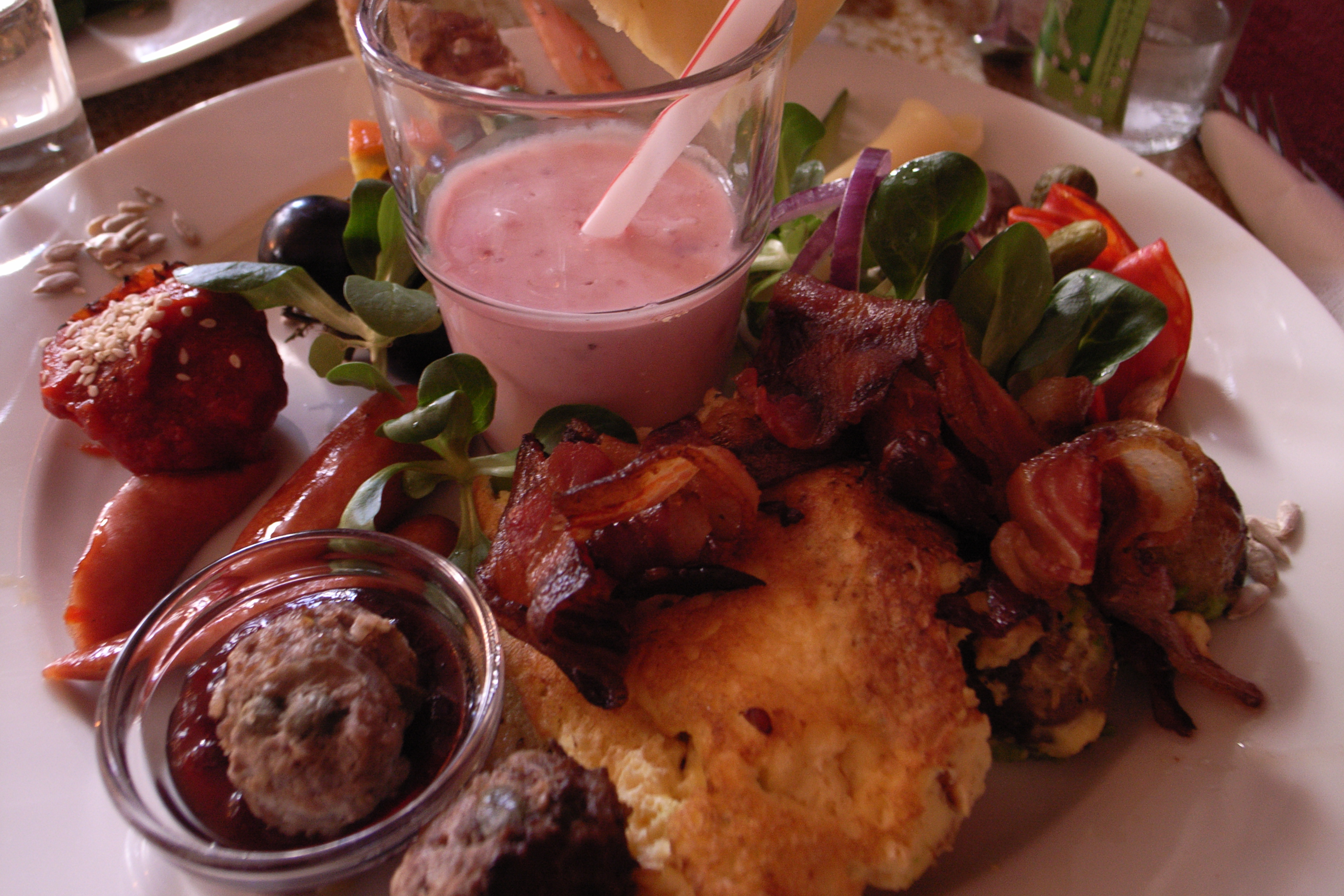
A plate of assorted brunch foods

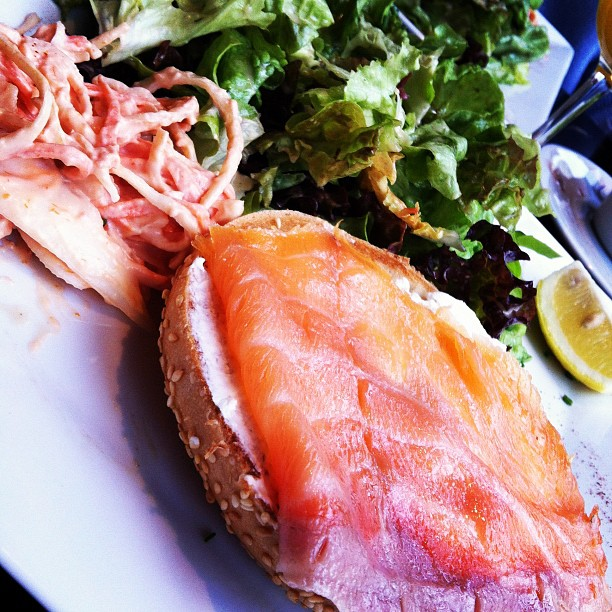
Some brunch foods – a bagel with cream cheese topped with smoked salmon, and salad

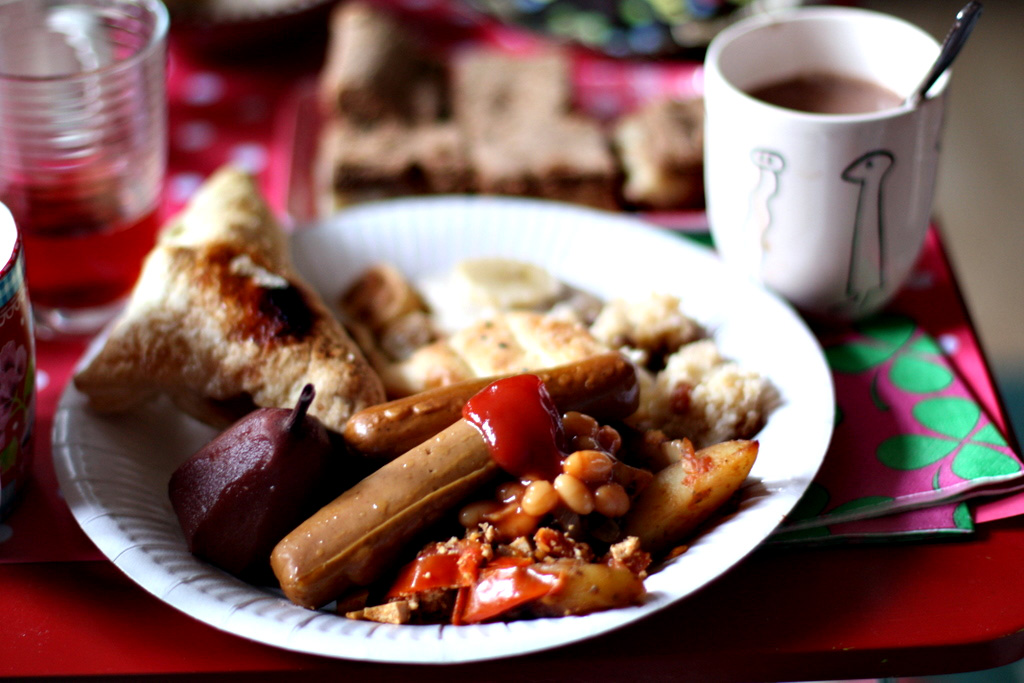
Vegan brunch foods

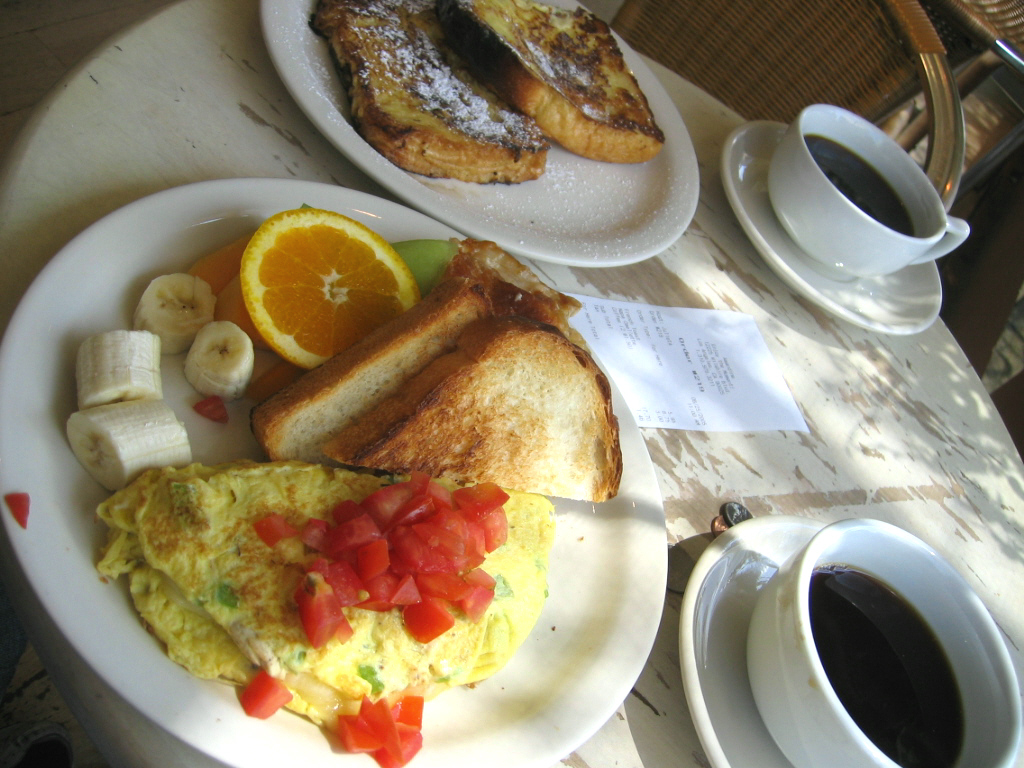
A brunch of an omelette, toast, French toast, fruit and coffee

=== Brunch beverages ===
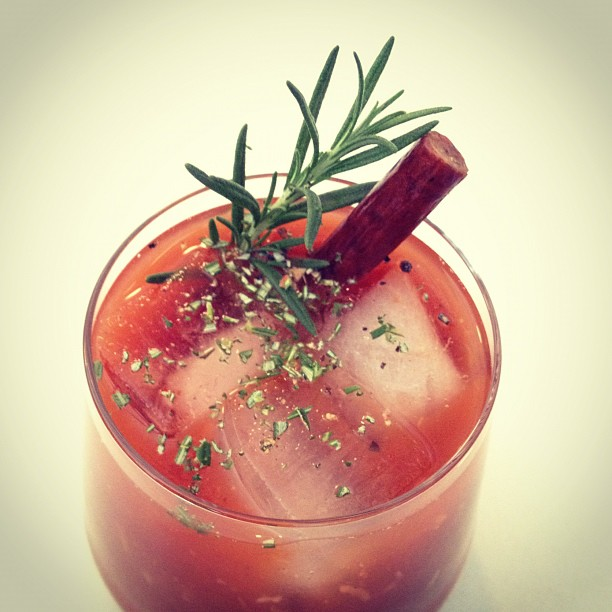
A Bloody Mary

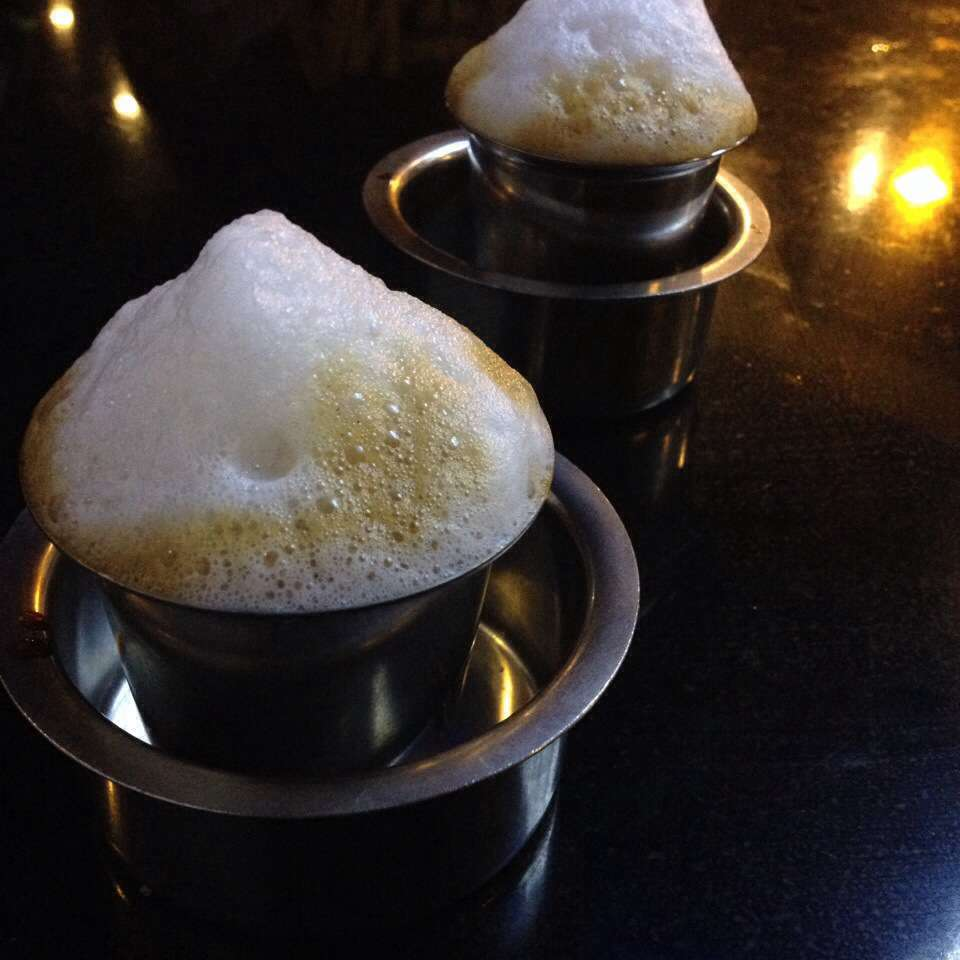
South Indian Coffee

The following beverages are often served for brunch.

==== Alcoholic ====
- Bloody Mary
- Champagne
- Caesar, popular in Canada
- Irish coffee
- Mimosa
- Spritzer
- Frühschoppen (German: "morning pint") – can be various types of beverage
- Bellini
- Screwdriver

==== Non-alcoholic ====
- Coffee
- Herbal tea
- Juices
- Orange juice
- Tea
- Yum cha (Cantonese: "drink tea") – a tea that is typically served along with dim sum
- Sparkling water

== See also ==
- Index of breakfast-related articles
- List of breakfast beverages
- List of breakfast foods
- List of culinary fruits
- List of fruit dishes
- Merienda – a light meal in various countries, usually taken in the afternoon or for brunch
- Second breakfast – a meal eaten after breakfast, but before lunch, it is traditional in Bavaria, Poland, and Hungary

== Bibliography ==
- Ternikar, F. (2014). Brunch: A History. The Meals Series. Rowman & Littlefield Publishers. ISBN 978-1-4422-2943-3. 164 pages.
