= North Melbourne Grand Final Breakfast =

Television series

The North Melbourne Grand Final Breakfast is a breakfast function organised by the North Melbourne Football Club on the morning of the AFL Grand Final. The breakfast marks the traditional beginning to Grand Final day and is one of the biggest social highlights on the Australian sporting calendar. Watching the event is a ritual for many footy fans, and the function plays a huge role in the pre-match build-up for the Grand Final.

== History ==
The first Grand Final Breakfast was held in 1967 at the Southern Cross Hotel, as a valuable fundraising event. The inaugural guest speaker was the Victorian Football League's administrative director Eric McCutchan. The event rose to prominence in the 1970s when the breakfast began to be televised across Victoria, and it was officially endorsed by the VFL as the official pre-match Grand Final function. Since then, the event has grown into a significant fundraiser for North Melbourne, and the guest list has grown to include prime ministers, state premiers, and other celebrities.

== Event ==
Although many clubs hold their own Grand Final Breakfasts, the North Melbourne Breakfast was the first breakfast and is currently the only breakfast to be officially endorsed by the AFL. This ensures a guest list that reads as a 'who's who' of Australian business, sport, entertainment and politics. The breakfast includes a Grand Auction, with all proceeds being donated to the Starlight Children's Foundation.

== Quotes ==
Former Prime Minister Bob Hawke described the event as “one of this nation’s great traditions”.

Paul Keating referred to the function as “a tradition in itself”

Prime Minister John Howard described it as “a tremendous institution …. and the most eclectic gathering of people you could possibly imagine”.

== Venues ==
| Year | Location | Guest speaker | Football Personality of the Year | North Melbourne's Media Award | Sponsor |
|---|---|---|---|---|---|
| 1967 | Southern Cross Hotel | Eric McCutchan | Not Awarded | Not Awarded | |
| 1968 | Southern Cross Hotel | Bruce Andrews | Ted Whitten | Not Awarded | |
| 1969 | Southern Cross Hotel | Henry Winneke | Kevin Murray | Not Awarded | |
| 1970 | Southern Cross Hotel | Don Chipp | Norm Smith | Not Awarded | |
| 1971 | Southern Cross Hotel | Bob Hawke | Ron Barrassi | Not Awarded | |
| 1972 | Southern Cross Hotel | John Gorton | Ron Casey | Not Awarded | |
| 1973 | Southern Cross Hotel | Jack Galbally | Keith Greig | Not Awarded | |
| 1974 | Southern Cross Hotel | Jim Cairns | Doug Wade | Not Awarded | |
| 1975 | Southern Cross Hotel | Rupert Hamer | Lou Richards | Not Awarded | |
| 1976 | Southern Cross Hotel | Malcolm Fraser | Eric McCutchan | Not Awarded | |
| 1977 | Southern Cross Hotel | Phillip Adams | John Kennedy | Not Awarded | |
| 1978 | Southern Cross Hotel | Norman Banks | HSV7's World of Sport | Not Awarded | |
| 1979 | Southern Cross Hotel | Peter Thompson | Barry Cable | Not Awarded | |
| 1980 | Southern Cross Hotel | Jack Thompson | Jack Hamilton | Not Awarded | |
| 1981 | Southern Cross Hotel | Kevin Bartlett | Jack Dyer | Not Awarded | |
| 1982 | Southern Cross Hotel | Malcolm Fraser | Tom Hafey & Malcolm Blight | Not Awarded | |
| 1983 | Southern Cross Hotel | Bob Hawke | Kevin Bartlett | Doug Heywood | |
| 1984 | Southern Cross Hotel | Olympic medallists | Bernie Quinlan | Scott Palmer | |
| 1985 | Southern Cross Hotel | Allen Aylett | John Kennedy | Harry Beitzel | |
| 1986 | Southern Cross Hotel | Jack Hamilton | Leigh Matthews | Ron Carter | |
| 1987 | Southern Cross Hotel | John Winneke | Wayne Schimmelbusch | Tom Lahiff | |
| 1988 | Southern Cross Hotel | Llew Edwards | Allan Jeans | Graham Dawson & Peter Booth | |
| 1989 | Southern Cross Hotel | Tony Fitzgerald | Simon Madden | Ian Major | |
| 1990 | Southern Cross Hotel | Professor Geoffrey Blainey | Michael Tuck | Bill Jacobs | |
| 1991 | Southern Cross Hotel | Thomas Keneally | Jim Stynes | Bob Davis | |
| 1992 | Southern Cross Hotel | Dr. Don Cordner | Collingwood FC Centenary | Rex Hunt | |
| 1993 | Southern Cross Hotel | Malcolm Turnbull | Alan Schwab | Harry Beitzel & Tom Lahiff | |
| 1994 | Southern Cross Hotel | John Dugan | Tony Shaw & Doug Hawkins | Coodabeen Champions | |
| 1995 | Exhibition Building | David Hill | Tony Lockett | Mike Sheahan | |
| 1996 | Melbourne Park Function Centre | Bryce Courtenay | Ross Oakley | Eddie McGuire | Toshiba |
| 1997 | Melbourne Park Function Centre | | | | |
| 1998 | Melbourne Park Function Centre | | | | |
| 1999 | | | | | |
| 2000 | Crown Melbourne | John Howard | Paul Salmon | | |
| 2001 | | | | | Axa |
| 2002 | Docklands Stadium | John Howard | | | Axa |
| 2003 | Melbourne Convention & Exhibition Centre | Peter Costello | | | Axa |
| 2004 | Melbourne Convention & Exhibition Centre | John Howard | Glenn Archer & Anthony Stevens | | Axa |
| 2005 | Melbourne Convention & Exhibition Centre | John Howard | Bryan Strauchan | | |
| 2006 | Melbourne Convention & Exhibition Centre | John Howard | | | TAC |
| 2007 | | | | | TAC |
| 2008 | The Grand Hyatt | | Leigh Matthews | | |
| 2009 | Melbourne Convention & Exhibition Centre | | | | Interactive |
| 2010 | Melbourne Convention & Exhibition Centre | Julia Gillard | Bruce McAvaney | | |
| 2011 | Docklands Stadium | Julia Gillard | Barry Hall | | |
| 2012 | Docklands Stadium | Stephen Conroy | | | Blackwoods |
| 2013 | Docklands Stadium | Tony Abbott | Kevin Sheedy | | Blackwoods |
| 2014 | Docklands Stadium | Julie Bishop | Lenny Hayes | | Blackwoods |
| 2015 | Melbourne Convention & Exhibition Centre | Malcolm Turnbull | Julie Corletto | Jonathan Brown | Blackwoods |
| 2016 | Melbourne Convention & Exhibition Centre | Malcolm Turnbull | Kyle Chalmers (Sports Personality) | Sarah Jones | Mazda |
| 2017 | Melbourne Convention & Exhibition Centre | Malcolm Turnbull | Erin Phillips | Nick Dal Santo | Mazda |
| 2018 | Melbourne Convention & Exhibition Centre | Scott Morrison | | | Mazda |
| 2019 | Melbourne Convention & Exhibition Centre | Josh Frydenberg | | | Mazda |
| 2020 | Online (due to the COVID-19 pandemic) | Scott Morrison | | | Mazda |
| 2021 | Online (due to the COVID-19 pandemic) | Scott Morrison | | | Mazda |
| 2022 | Melbourne Convention & Exhibition Centre | Anthony Albanese | | | Mazda |

== See also ==
- Champagne breakfast
- Index of breakfast-related articles
- List of dining events
- NRL Grand Final Breakfast
