= List of breakfast drinks =

This is a list of breakfast drinks, consisting of drinks that are or have formerly been commonly consumed at breakfast. This list consists of and is limited to very common breakfast drinks that have been denoted as such in various cultures and societies.

== Common breakfast drinks ==
Name	Image	Description
Apple juice		A breakfast drink produced mainly in China, Poland, the United States, and Germany.
Liquid Breakfast		A Costa Rican breakfast drink (literally translated as "liquid breakfast") made with panela.
Beer		Tea replaced beer as the breakfast drink for women and children in Britain during the 18th century.
Carnation Instant Breakfast		A U.S.-based quick breakfast drink.
Coffee		A common breakfast drink in many cultures. It is typically consumed in the morning to increase alertness due to its high caffeine content.
Energy drink		Similar to coffee, they are used to wake up and be alert due to their high caffeine content. However, frequent energy drink usage is associated with stress, anxiety, and depression.
Grapefruit juice		A fruit juice that is sometimes consumed at breakfast in the United States.
Hot chocolate		A common breakfast drink in Europe. (Note: "In Europe today, hot chocolate is a favorite breakfast drink and is considered healthy for children.")
Instant breakfast		A powdered drink mix typically mixed with milk.
Lassi		A yogurt drink popular at breakfast in India in the summer.
Milk		A traditional breakfast drink in the Netherlands and the United States.
Orange juice		A common breakfast drink in North America, the United Kingdom, Spain and Italy .
Salep, or saloop		A primary breakfast drink in the Ottoman Empire before tea and coffee rose to prominence.
Sarabba		An Indonesian breakfast drink that is similar to chai.
Soy milk	A cup of hot soy milk	Consumed in China as a hot breakfast drink.
Tea		In some cultures, tea is consumed in the morning or as a part of breakfast. For example, in Fijian cuisine, tea is consumed in the morning in tin bowls. In Tajikistan, a tea named choi is consumed at breakfast. Tea is also consumed during breakfast in Eritrea. Porcelain tea service basins for the consumption of tea at breakfast exist.
Tomato juice		In the United States, mass-produced tomato juice began to be marketed in the mid-1920s, and it became a popular breakfast drink.

== See also ==
- Champagne breakfast
- History of breakfast
- List of breakfast foods
- List of breakfast topics
- List of brunch foods
