= Stammtisch =

Informal group meeting on a regular basis

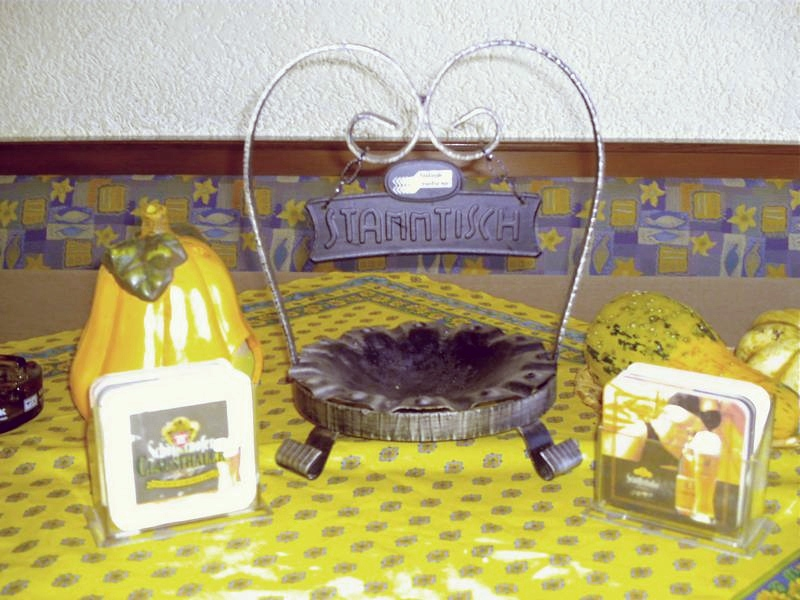
A typical sign for the Stammtisch is a special ashtray

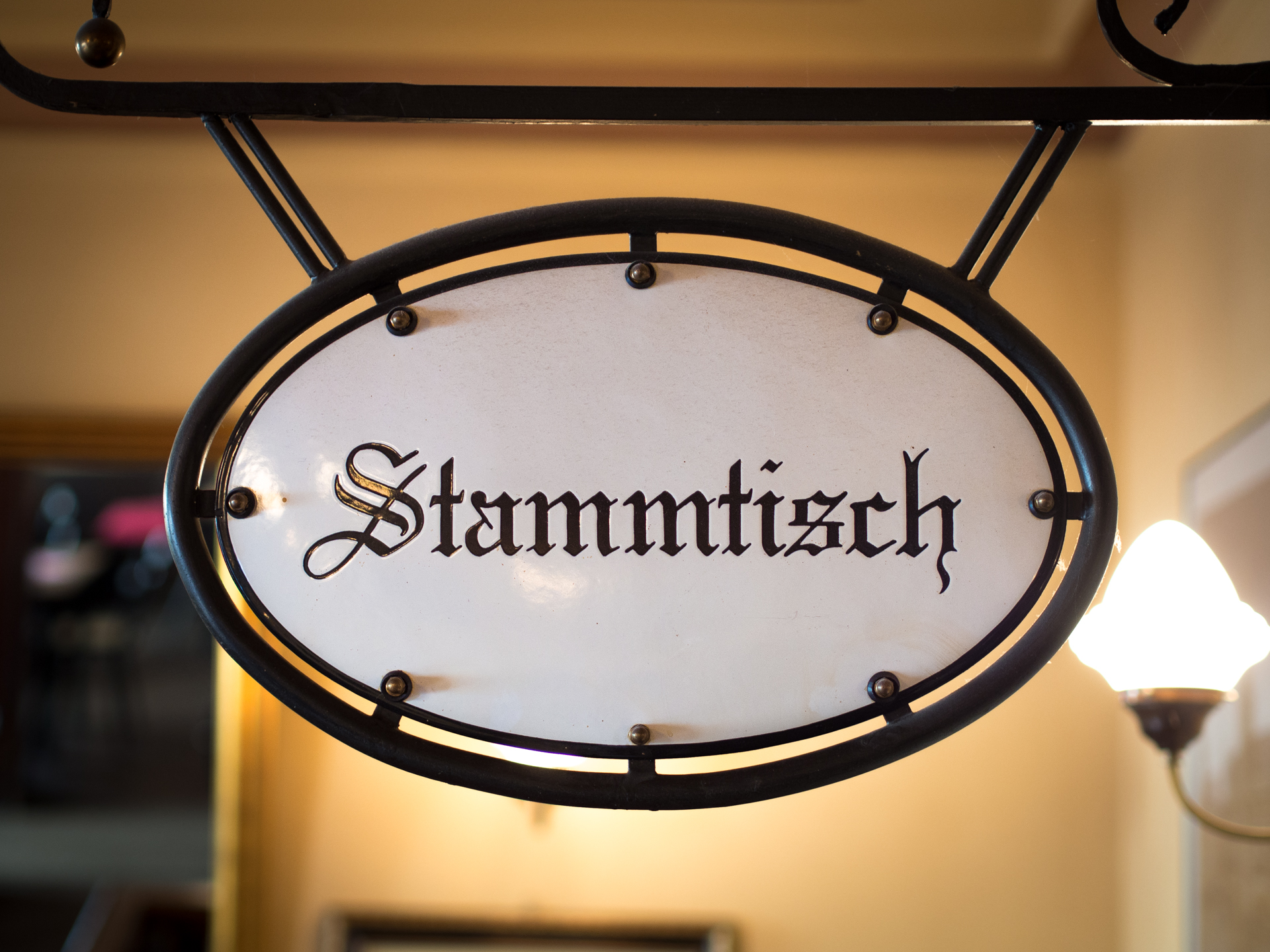
An enamel Stammtisch sign in a bar in Munich

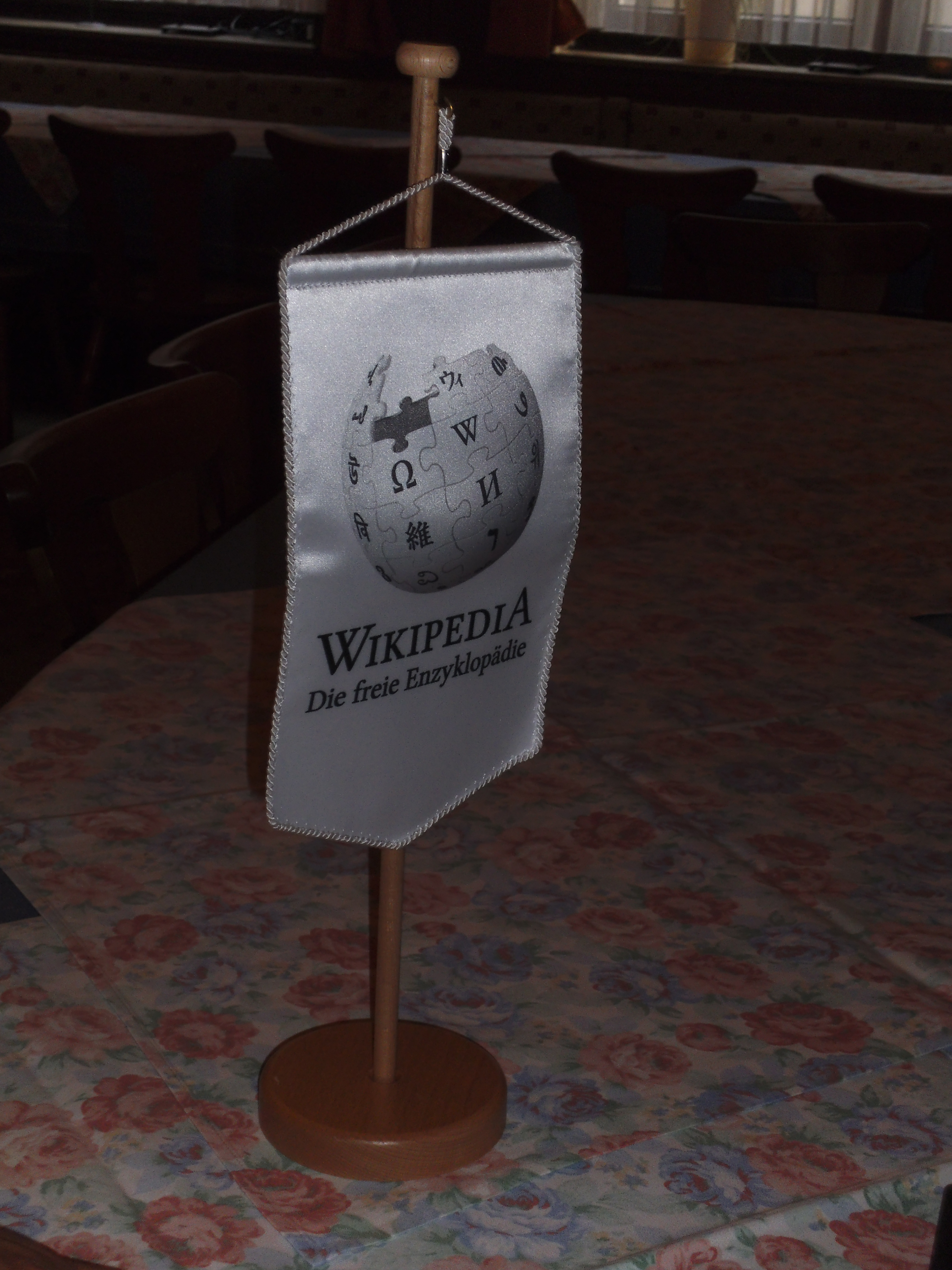
The pennant of a usual Wikipedia Stammtisch (at Duisburg)

A Stammtisch (German for "regulars' table", [ˈʃtamtɪʃ]) is an informal group meeting held on a regular basis, and also the usually large, often round table around which the group meets. A Stammtisch is not a structured meeting, but rather a friendly get-together.

Traditionally, the meeting table is marked with a somewhat elaborate sign reserving it for regulars. Historically, a Stammtisch was an all-male affair that might involve socialising, card playing (such as Skat or Schafkopf), and often political or philosophical discussions. The words Stammtischpolitik (Stammtisch politics) and Stammtischniveau (Stammtisch level) describe the simplified nature of Stammtisch discussions, and have an established metaphorical usage in describing simplified political and social discussions beyond the Stammtisch itself.

== History ==
=== Past ===
Especially in rural areas and smaller villages, being part of the Stammtisch was often related to a certain social status. In the second half of the 19th century a Stammtisch typically consisted of local dignitaries such as the mayor, doctor, pharmacist, teacher, forester or wealthy farmers. Inviting a stranger to take a seat at the Stammtisch was a sign of extraordinary appreciation. This was similarly the case with types of regulars’ tables in cafes consisting of writers and artists.

This culture is still to be found in the Iberian area (Spain, Portugal, Latin America and Brazil) in the form of Tertulias. In Great Britain and Ireland many pubs fulfilled this function by having a snug or otherwise offering separate back rooms (in case there was no doorkeeper). In the United States a group of regulars (such as in the T.V. series Cheers) would be a close equivalent.

=== Today's meaning ===
Today a Stammtisch is not connected to a specific social status. It is now all about community, intimacy and shared interests, such as traditional card games.

== Socio-cultural aspects ==
=== In the countryside ===
Here the Stammtisch is still one of the main places for social interaction. Especially the lack of varied leisure time facilities and local media leads to the Stammtisch being an important center to socialise: Local relationships are being managed and news exchanged. A Stammtisch does not just take place in the evenings but also after the Sunday Mass, called "Frühschoppen" (English: "Morning Half-Pint"). Sometimes a Stammtisch is the organizer of local events such as fairs.

=== In the city ===
In urban areas, especially in the late 1990s, different kinds of Stammtisch groups have been established acting like a loose, informal club of people sharing similar interests on a specific topic. They are meant for socialising, exchange of experience and networking (e.g. Stammtisch for parents). Networking organisations such as clubs for marketers or entrepreneurs often call their regular events, which are also open to non members, a Stammtisch.

=== Historical examples ===
- E. T. A. Hoffmann's literary Stammtisch in Lutter & Wegner (a famous restaurant which still exists today, in Berlin).
- Die Brille, a Stammtisch of artists and young actors from the Deutsches Theater in Berlin, which led to the founding of the cabaret Schall und Rauch under the guidance of Max Reinhardt in 1901.

=== Stammtisch in literature ===
- The Butterfly, Wilhelm Busch
- Stammtisch: my life and times, Ernest Müller

=== Stammtisch in German TV ===
- ARD broadcast with host Werner Höfer and five international journalists as his guests. A waitress would serve drinks to the group.
- BR Fernsehen has broadcast a Sunday Stammtisch since 2007.

=== Stammtisch in English ===
Although not used popularly, the word itself is an idiomatic expression which does not have an English equivalent. The nearest would be 'regulars' table'. Thus the word has already two established plural versions in English:

- Stammtisches. Here from a Munich guide book: "The Stammtisches are often filled with high ranking political figures..."
- Stammtische. Here from Max Lerner's book Ideas are Weapons (1936): "Such surely must have been the talk at the Munich Stammtische where habitues of all descriptions gathered over their beer and quarreled about the diverse roads to a commonly held Germanic mission."

== See also ==
- Salon (gathering) in French culture and more generally
- Tertulia in Ibero-American culture
- Munch, in BDSM culture
