= Midnight breakfast =

Communal US meal

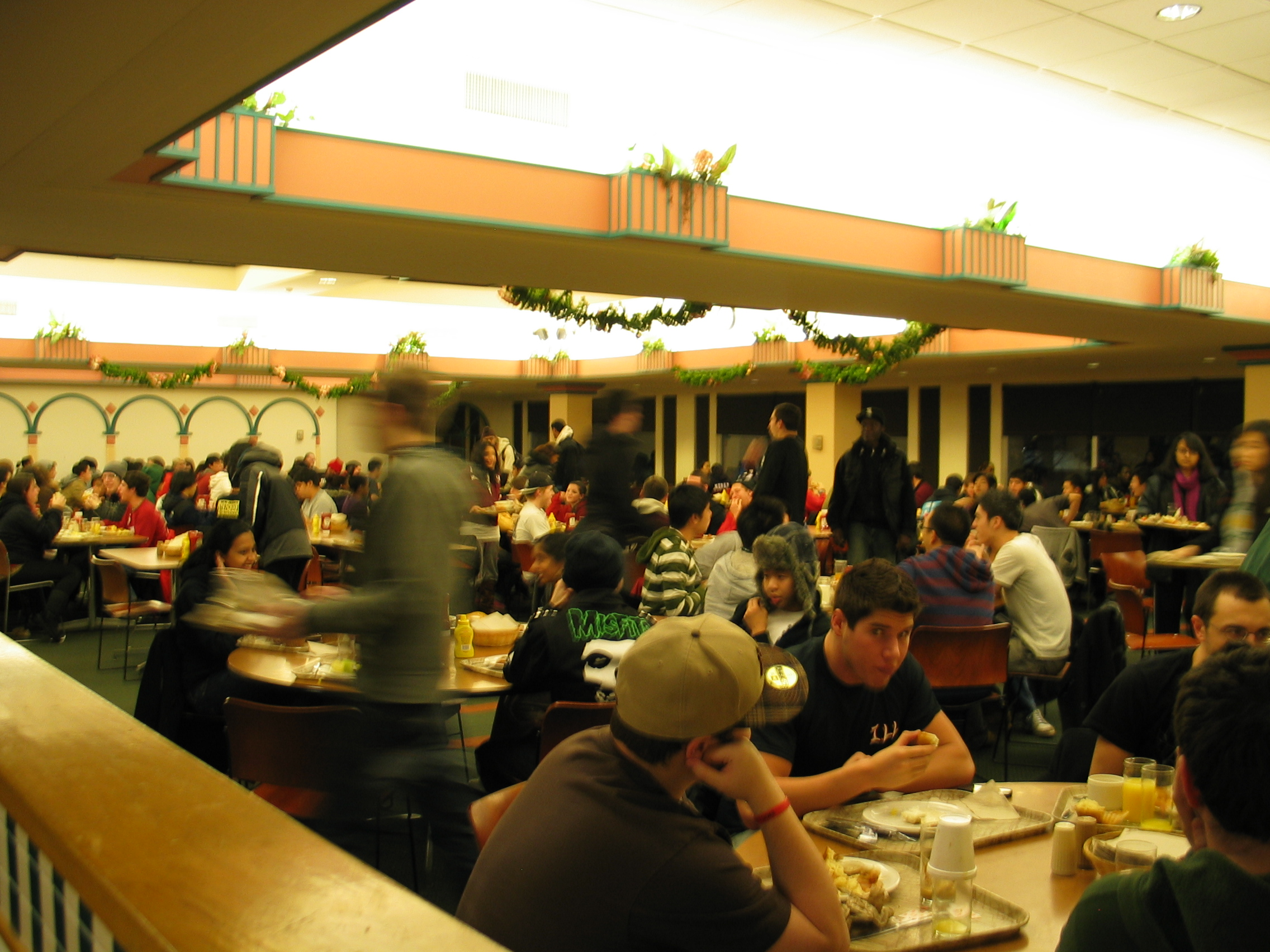
Students eating Midnight Breakfast at Tillett Dining Hall, Livingston Campus, Rutgers University

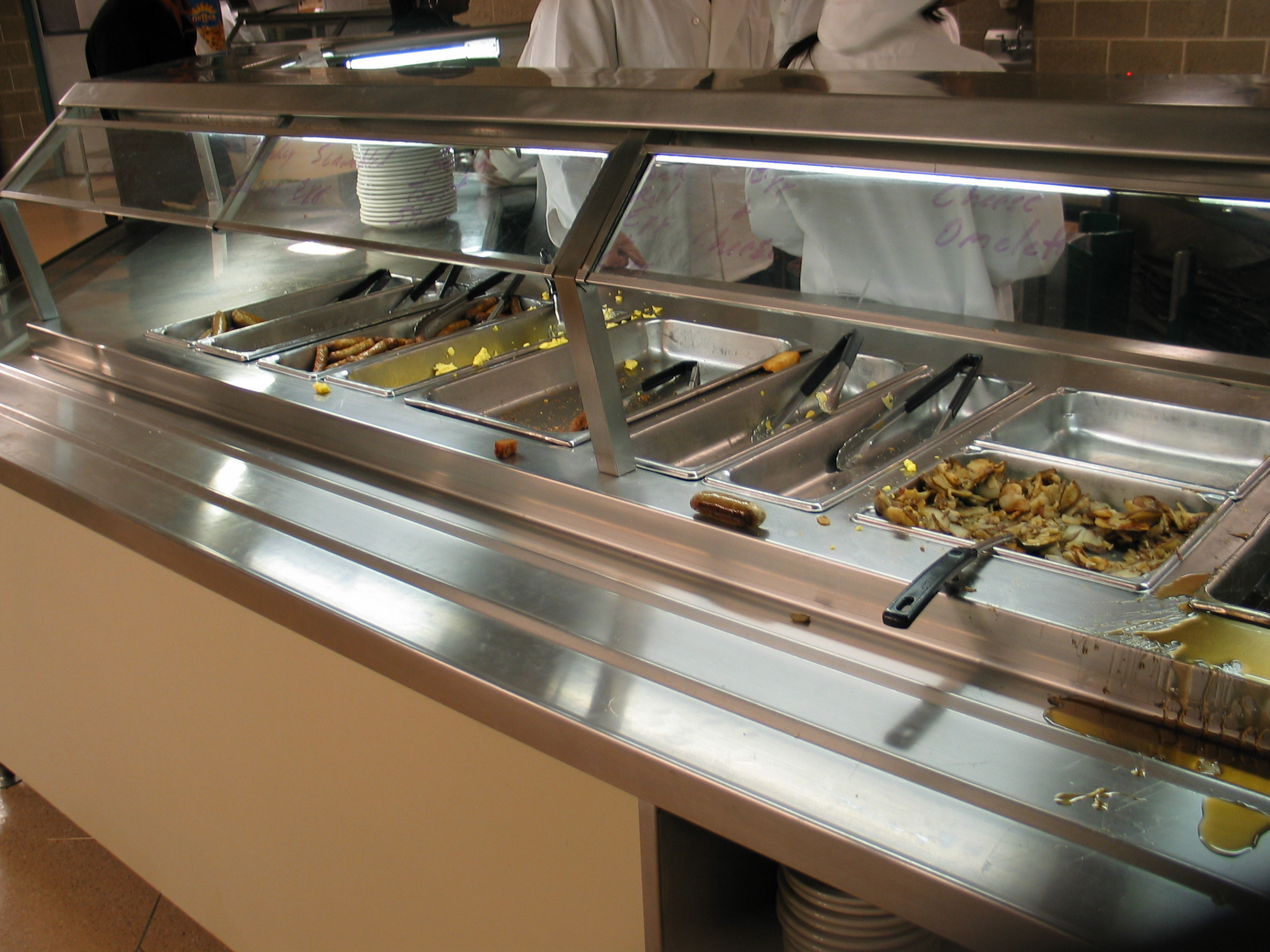
Midnight breakfast at Tillett Dining Hall, Livingston Campus, Rutgers University

Midnight breakfast is a generic term for a communal meal served at some American colleges and universities, often served during finals week. Culinary dishes that are generally considered breakfast foods are served in the school's dining hall late at night (hence "midnight") as a study break before or during final exams, or as a traditional community-building event. Sometimes food is served by faculty and staff. Midnight breakfast is an occasional event and should not be confused with school dining facilities that operate 24 hours a day on a regular basis.

== History ==
The origins of the finals-week midnight breakfast tradition are unclear. The term was already used for campus social breakfast traditions by at least 1931, although those earlier events were not necessarily connected to final examinations. One of the earliest recorded instances of its modern use is in 1954, at the Georgia College & State University, in Milledgeville,Georgia. The modern form was established at several American colleges by the 1980s. Some institutions subsequently adopted the practice after learning of similar programs at other universities.

== Selected examples ==
At Swarthmore College, to mark the beginning of exam week, the meal is accompanied with the “Primal Scream” at the end of every semester during the last night of reading week. Students who are not able to go to the meal will still open their windows and scream as loudly as possible, regardless of location.

At George Washington University, the event has sometimes attracted several thousand participants. The university reported approximately 2,500 students and 100 faculty and staff participants at its 2010 Midnight Breakfast.
