= NRL Grand Final Breakfast =

Australian rugby league event

The NRL Grand Final breakfast is a function organised by the National Rugby League on the week of the NRL Grand Final. The breakfast marks the traditional beginning to grand final day and is one of the biggest social highlights on the Australian sporting calendar. Watching the event is a ritual for many footy fans and the function plays a huge role in the pre match build up for the grand final.

== Venues ==
Year	Location	Network	Reference
2001	Star City Casino	Fox Sports	
2002	Star City Casino	Fox Sports	
2003	Dockside Cockle Bay Wharf	Fox Sports	
2004	The Westin Sydney	Fox Sports	
2005	The Westin Sydney	Fox Sports	
2006	The Westin Sydney	Fox Sports	
2007	The Westin Sydney	Fox Sports	
2008	The Westin Sydney	Fox Sports	
2009	Sydney Convention and Exhibition Centre	Fox Sports	
2010	Sydney Convention and Exhibition Centre	Fox Sports	
2011	Sydney Convention and Exhibition Centre	Fox Sports	
2012	Doltone House	Fox Sports	
2013		Fox Sports	
2014		Fox Sports	
2015		Fox Sports	
2016		Fox Sports	
2017		Fox League	
2020	Royal Randwick Racecourse	Fox League	
2021	Sydney Convention and Exhibition Centre	Fox League	

== See also ==
- Champagne breakfast
- Index of breakfast-related articles
- List of dining events
- North Melbourne Grand Final Breakfast
