= Frühschoppen =

German and Austrian drinking tradition

Frühschoppen (German pronunciation: [ˈfʁyːʃɔpm̩], meaning: an alcoholic drink before midday in company) is the German and Austrian tradition of meeting up at a pub, inn, or tavern in the late morning, usually on Sundays. The specific customs vary from region to region. Frühschoppen is often a kind of brunch, but does not necessarily involve food. Frühschoppen is also often held at fun fairs, the most famous being Oktoberfest or Cannstatter Volksfest. In the Netherlands is it held at carnival, mostly near the German border.

In Lower Bavaria and most of Upper Bavaria, Frühschoppen is understood to be a specific kind of brunch consisting of Weisswurst, sweet mustard, pretzels, and Weissbier (an unfiltered wheat beer). The Bavarian Frühschoppen began in rural areas and has originally taken place on Sundays in a tavern at the regulars' table (Stammtisch). During Frühschoppen, folk may discuss everyday life and politics. In the corner of the tavern or festival tent (Festzelt) there is typically a band playing Volksmusik. (Nowadays some places have pop, rock, and jazz bands.)

In many other regions of Germany, Frühschoppen is understood more generally to be a gathering in a pub on Sunday morning, traditionally held after church service. This usually includes the consumption of alcoholic beverages, but not necessarily that of a meal. With the decline of church attendance in Germany this tradition has become somewhat less common, but is still held up in many places, especially in rural areas.
