= Wedding breakfast =

Feast given to the newlyweds and guests after the wedding

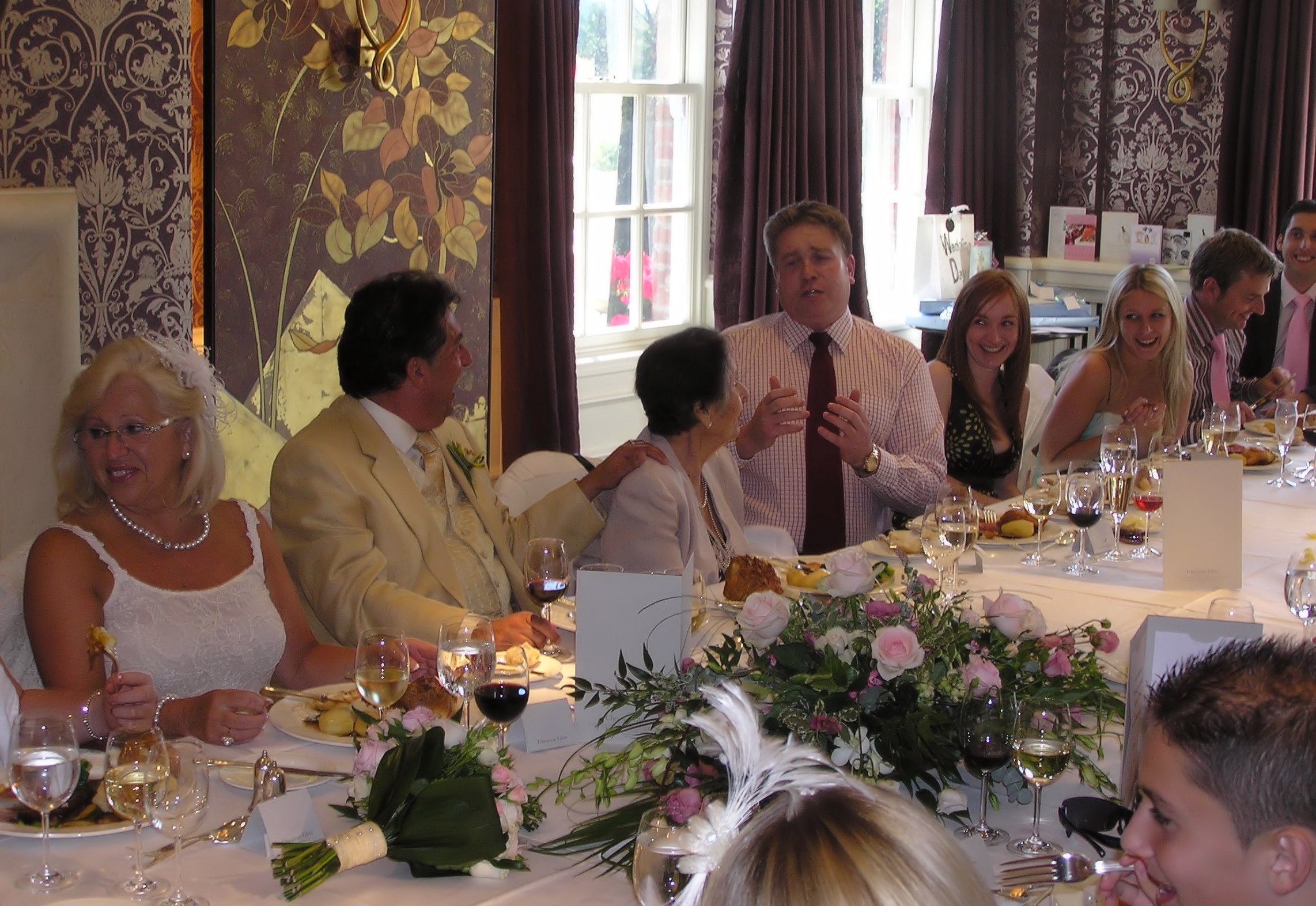
Entertainment at an English wedding breakfast. The organisers have hired two opera singers to sing arias during the meal, for the entertainment of the guests. The mother of the groom is being serenaded.

A wedding breakfast is a feast given to the newlyweds and guests after the wedding, making it equivalent to a wedding reception that serves a meal. The phrase is still used in British English.

Nowadays the wedding breakfast is not normally a morning meal, nor does it look like a typical breakfast, so its name can be confusing.

== Origin of the name ==
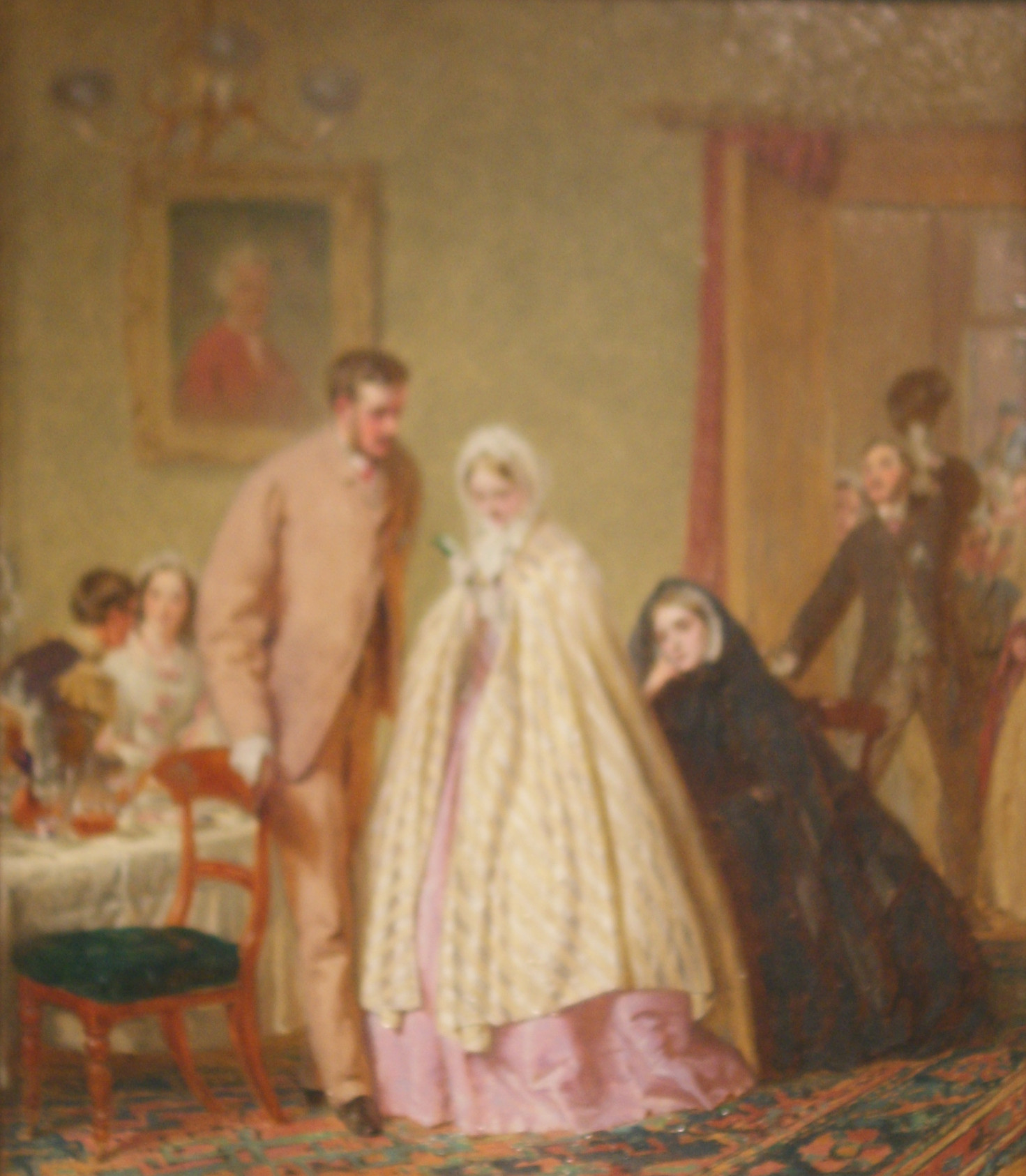
George Elgar Hicks's "The Wedding Breakfast", 1862

The name is claimed to have arisen from the fact that in pre-Reformation times, the wedding service was usually a Eucharistic Mass and that the newlyweds would therefore have been fasting before the wedding in order to be eligible to receive the sacrament of Holy Communion. After the wedding ceremony was complete, the priest would bless and distribute some wine, cakes, and sweetmeats, which were then handed round to the company, including the newlyweds. This distribution of food and drink was therefore a literal "break fast" for the newly married couple, though others in attendance would not necessarily take Communion and therefore would not necessarily have been fasting. Since usage of the phrase cannot be shown to date back earlier than the first half of the 19th century however, a pre-16th-century origin seems unlikely.

The Oxford English Dictionary does not record any occurrences of the phrase "wedding breakfast" before 1850, but it was used at least as far back as 1838. (Note: In a newspaper review of a recently published book, The Veteran by John Harley, the reviewer quotes: "C--- and his bride returned to the coffee house, where they were received with great kindness the master and mistress who, notwithstanding the short notice, had a comfortable wedding-breakfast prepared for them".)

The author of Party-giving on Every Scale (London, 1880) suggests the phrase may have evolved fifty years earlier:

The orthodox "Wedding Breakfast" might more properly be termed a "Wedding Luncheon," as it assumes the character of that meal to a great extent; in any case it bears little relation to the breakfast of that day, although the title of breakfast is still applied to it, out of compliment to tradition. As recently as fifty years ago luncheon was not a recognised meal, even in the wealthiest families, and the marriage feast was modernised into the wedding breakfast, which appellation this entertainment still bears.

— Unknown, Party-giving on Every Scale (London, 1880)

== Current use ==
The Compact Oxford Dictionary lists the phrase as only "British", and the Merriam-Webster online dictionary does not list it at all.

The custom of the wedding breakfast is occasionally spotted in non-English-speaking countries that market themselves as wedding destinations, e.g. Poland.

== See also ==
- List of breakfast topics
- Wedding
- Wedding reception
- Rehearsal dinner
