= Champagne breakfast =

Meal served with champagne or sparkling wine

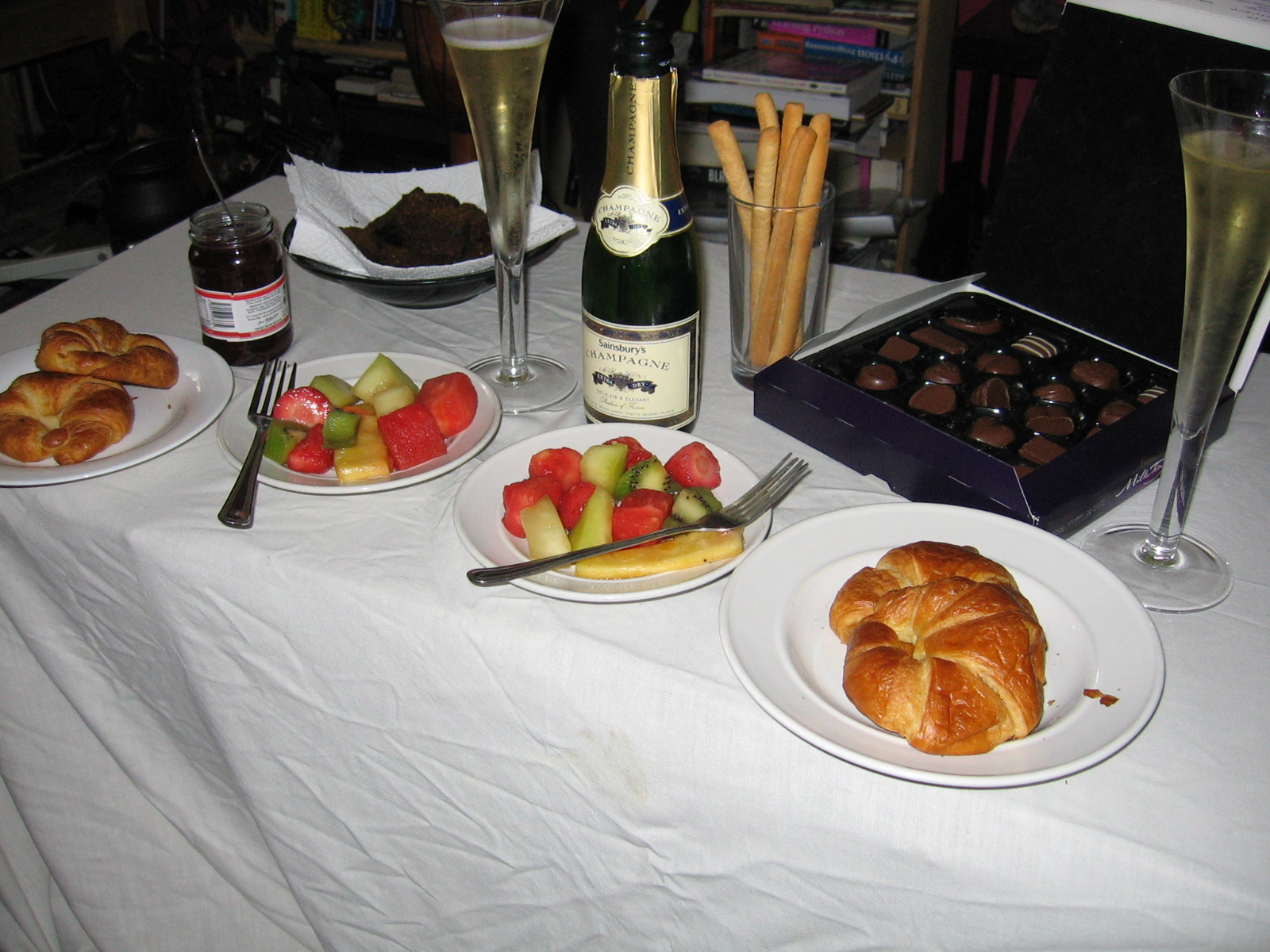
Champagne breakfast

A champagne breakfast is a breakfast served with champagne or sparkling wine. It is a new concept in some countries and is not typical of the role of a breakfast.

It may be part of any day or outing considered particularly luxurious or indulgent. The accompanying breakfast is sometimes of a similarly high standard and may include rich foods such as salmon, caviar, chocolate or pastries, which would not ordinarily be eaten at breakfast, or may include additional courses. Instead of as a formal meal the breakfast can be given to the recipient in a basket or hamper.

== Occasions ==
As part of a day where scheduled activities have been arranged, the breakfast may be served early in the day, or even at sunrise. The breakfast may be as part of a cruise or tour. It can be a part of honeymooning couple's itinerary, or stay at a hotel, when it may be delivered to the couple in bed. This can also be a part of Valentine's Day or a Valentine's Day holiday package. It's also common at the end of a ski holiday.

=== Celebrations ===
The breakfast can be delivered or served to someone as part of any treat acknowledging the person's worth, such as Mother's Day, or as a celebration of an event or achievement. A champagne breakfast was even fed to Red Marauder when the horse won the Grand National. It may be a tradition at some colleges for graduation, such as Wells College and Bryn Mawr College. People may be awarded a Champagne breakfast as part of winning a competition.

=== Business or charity ===
The breakfast may be hosted as a means of attracting people for the launch of a business, or a charity fundraiser.

== See also ==
- List of breakfast topics
- North Melbourne Grand Final Breakfast
- NRL Grand Final Breakfast
