= Rehearsal dinner =

Wedding tradition

A rehearsal dinner is a traditional pre-wedding ceremony in the United States, usually held after the wedding rehearsal and the night before the wedding ceremony.

The guests generally include the married-to-be couple and others who form the wedding party. The rehearsal dinner costs are traditionally incurred by the groom's parents. However, modern traditions allow for either the bride's or the groom's parents to incur these costs. It is common that out of town guests to be invited to the rehearsal dinner as well.

The purpose of the rehearsal dinner is for the relatives and friends of the bride and groom to meet and have a good time. The couple generally takes this opportunity to thank everyone who has helped with the wedding preparations. Activities generally include toasting and the presentation of small gifts for those who have helped plan the wedding.

== See also ==
- Wedding breakfast
- Wedding reception
