= Eric McCutchan =

Australian rules footballer, born 1913

Eric Oswald McCutchan OBE (1913 – 22 November 1991) was a leading Australian rules football administrator in the Victorian Football League (VFL).

Beginning his administrative career with the VFL in 1932, McCutchan gave 44 years service to the league. From 1945 to 1955 he was Assistant Secretary of the VFL, and from 1956 he was Secretary, a position he held until 1965. He was administrative director from 1966 to 1976.

He played a major role in the development of Waverley Park. He presented the premiership Cup to Hawthorn after the 1991 AFLGrand Final – the only Grand Final played at Waverley.

McCutchan was inducted to the Australian Football Hall of Fame in 1996. He was educated at Wesley College, Melbourne. He was appointed an Officer of the Order of the British Empire in December 1976 for services to sports administration.

== See also ==
- Australian football at the 1956 Summer Olympics
