= Brunch =

Meal that combines breakfast and lunch

Brunch (/ˈbrʌntʃ/) is a meal eaten in the late morning as a combination of a late breakfast and early lunch. In practice commercial establishments often offer brunch style foods outside of this period. The word brunch is a portmanteau of breakfast and lunch.

The term "brunch" was first used by British writer Guy Beringer in his 1895 essay "Brunch: A Plea," published in Hunter's Weekly, where he proposed it as a leisurely and more sociable alternative to traditional Sunday meals. Brunch was popularized in the early 20th century in the United States, where it first appeared in New Orleans in the late 1890s, and became a staple of upper-class dining culture in New York City in the early 1920s. While the term is Anglo-American, similar traditions exist around the world, such as Cantonese dim sum.

Brunch menus vary by location and culture. In the United States, brunch is seen as an especially indulgent meal; rich dishes such as eggs benedict and chicken and waffles are common, as well as juice-based cocktails, like the Bloody Mary and mimosa.

== History ==
The 1896 supplement to the Oxford English Dictionary cites Punch magazine, which wrote that the term was coined in Britain in 1895 to describe a Sunday meal for "Saturday-night carousers" in the writer Guy Beringer's article "Brunch: A Plea" in Hunter's Weekly.

Instead of England's early Sunday dinner, a postchurch ordeal of heavy meats and savory pies, the author wrote, why not a new meal, served around noon, that starts with tea or coffee, marmalade and other breakfast fixtures before moving along to the heavier fare

By eliminating the need to get up early on Sunday, brunch would make life brighter for Saturday-night carousers. It would promote human happiness in other ways as well.

"Brunch is cheerful, sociable and inciting", Beringer wrote. "It is talk-compelling. It puts you in a good temper, it makes you satisfied with yourself and your fellow beings, it sweeps away the worries and cobwebs of the week."

— William Grimes, "At Brunch, the More Bizarre the Better" New York Times, 1998

Brunch developed into a luxurious restaurant meal in the American South, first appearing in New Orleans in the late 1890s. Madame Elizabeth Begué, a German immigrant to New Orleans, is credited with being the first to offer "second breakfast" at her restaurant, Begué's. Meals at Begué's would consist of a six to seven course feast spanning several hours, served with champagne and chicory coffee. The 1884 World's Fair would attract tourists to the city, bringing Begué's into national prominence. Brunch restaurants flourished in New Orleans; notable spots include Brennan's, Antoine's, and Cafe du Monde.

Brunch became popular among the upper class in New York City between 1920 and 1950. In 1939, the New York Times devoted a Sunday feature to the meal, though it notes that the term 'brunch' was chiefly used within the home; Manhattan restaurants offering the same meal advertised it under terms like 'bracer breakfast' and 'hunt breakfast.' Some leaned heavily into theming and entertainment. For their 'hunt lunch', the Hotel Lombardy's waiters wore hunting pink jackets, while at the Madison, Sunday brunches were accompanied by live music and dance. Menus typically featured substantial savory dishes—hunter-style veal and kidney sauté at the Lombardy, lamb kidneys and sausages turbigo at the Madison, fried seafood, chicken and corned-beef hashes, Boston baked beans—along with breads, pastries, eggs, juices, and coffee. Cocktails accompanied the meal where the law allowed. New York City's liquor regulations prohibited alcohol service in restaurants until 1:00 PM, so many brunches began around that time.

== Around the world ==
Brunch in its modern form originated as an elite urban meal in the late nineteenth-century Anglo-American world, but has since spread internationally, adapting to local customs and cuisines. Several pre-existing traditions also exist, including Cantonese yum cha, and are often discussed alongside it.

=== East Asia ===
Yum cha, a Cantonese dim sum brunch, is popular in Chinese restaurants worldwide. It consists of a variety of stuffed buns, dumplings, and other savory or sweet foods that have been steamed, deep-fried, or baked. Customers select small portions from passing carts, as the kitchen continuously produces and sends out freshly prepared dishes. Dim sum is usually eaten at a mid-morning, midday, or mid-afternoon teatime.

The Chinese word "早午饭" (pinyin: zǎo wǔfàn) is defined as brunch, with "早饭" (zǎofàn; 早: morning, 饭: meal) meaning breakfast; and "午饭" (wǔfàn; 午: noon, 饭: meal) meaning lunch. The combination of "早饭" and "午饭" is thus "早午饭", brunch.

=== French ===
The Office québécois de la langue française accepts 'brunch' as a valid word but also provides a synonym déjeuner-buffet. Note that, however, in Quebec, déjeuner alone (even without the qualifying adjective petit) means 'breakfast'. In Quebec, the word—when francized—is pronounced [bʁɔ̃ʃ]. The common pronunciation in France is [bʁœnʃ].

=== Italian ===
In Italian, the English loanword 'brunch' is generally used, though the neologism/calque colanzo is increasingly popular, being derived from colazione (breakfast) and pranzo (lunch). Even less common but occasionally used are colapranzo and pranzolazione, both derived from the same sources.

The usage of these terms varies in Italy, as different regions have different cultural definitions of mealtimes and their names. Traditional usage, particularly in northern Italy, included calling the first meal of the day prima colazione (first colazione), and the second meal either colazione or seconda colazione (second colazione), as distinguished from pranzo, the evening meal (now generally used as the term for the midday meal). In this scheme, a separate term for 'brunch' would not be necessary, as colazione could be used as a general term for any meal taken in the morning or early afternoon. Although Italian meal terminologies have generally shifted since widespread use of this naming scheme, the concept of a distinct mid-morning meal combining features of breakfast and lunch is largely one imported from the UK and North America in the last century, so the Anglicism 'brunch' is predominant.

=== Canada ===
The Ontario area now known as Leslieville neighbourhood is sometimes called the brunch capital of Toronto, as many renowned establishments serve brunch there. Brunch buffets also exist in other parts of Southern Ontario, including Kitchener-Waterloo.

In Canada, brunch is served in private homes and in restaurants. In both cases, brunch typically consists of the same dishes as would be standard in an American brunch, namely, coffee, tea, fruit juices, breakfast foods, including pancakes, waffles, and french toast; meats such as ham, bacon, and sausages; egg dishes such as scrambled eggs, omelettes, and eggs Benedict; bread products, such as toast, bagels or croissants; pastries or cakes, such as cinnamon rolls and coffee cake; and fresh cut fruit or fruit salad. Brunches may also include foods not typically associated with breakfast, such as roasted meats, quiche, soup, smoked salmon, sandwiches, and salads, such as Cobb salad.

When served at home or in a restaurant, a brunch may be offered buffet style, in which trays of foods and beverages are available and guests may serve themselves and select the items they want, often in an "all-you-can-eat" fashion. Restaurant brunches may also be served from a menu, in which case guests select specific items that are served by waitstaff. Restaurant brunch meals range from relatively inexpensive brunches available at diners and family restaurants to expensive brunches served at high-end restaurants and bistros.

=== Philippines ===
Brunch in the Philippines is served between 9:00 am and noon. Contrary to what is observed in other countries, brunch in the afternoon, between 3:00 and 4:00 pm, is called merienda, a traditional snack carried over from Spanish colonialism.

== Gallery ==
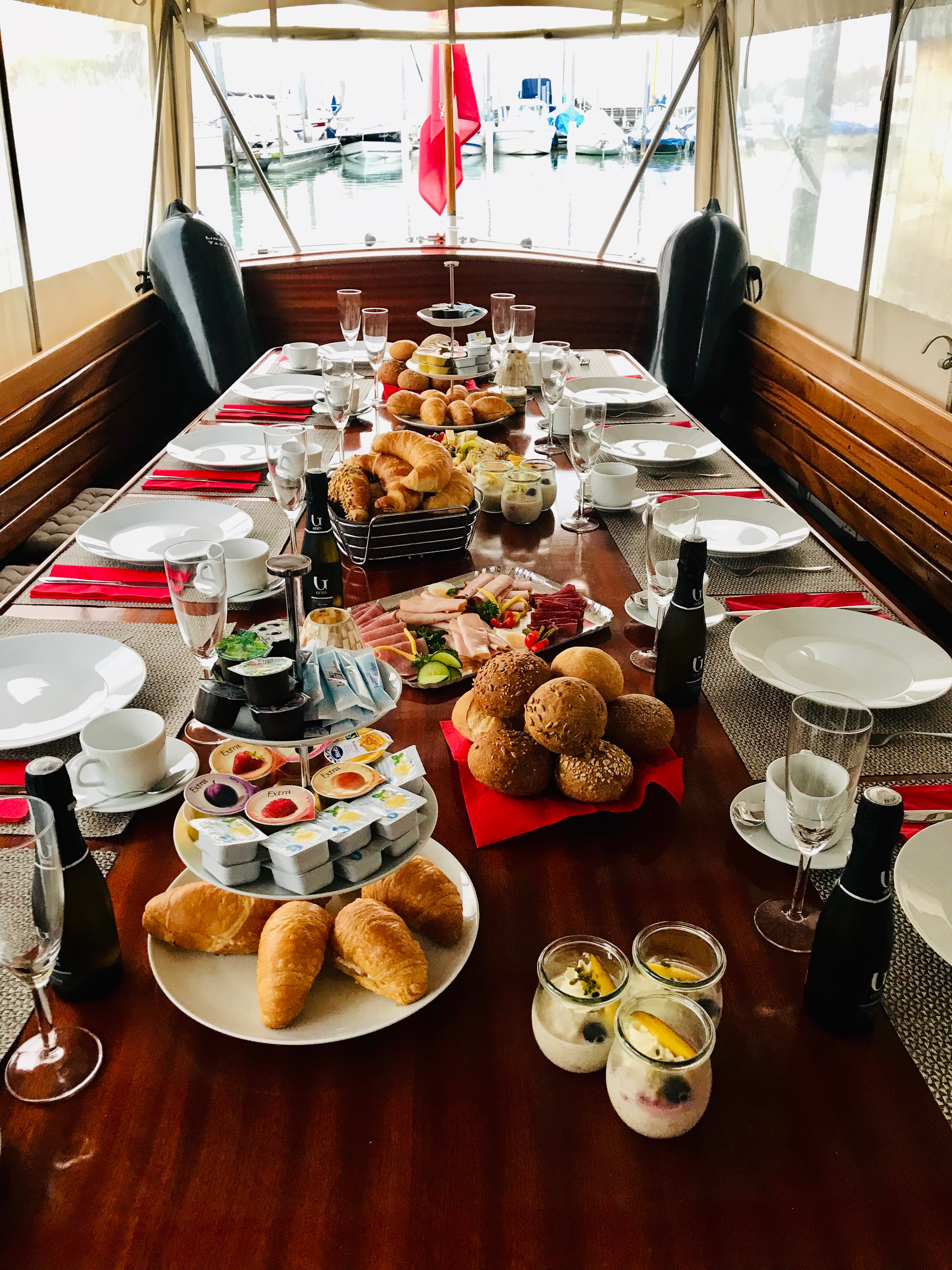
A brunch on a ship, Lake Constance, Germany

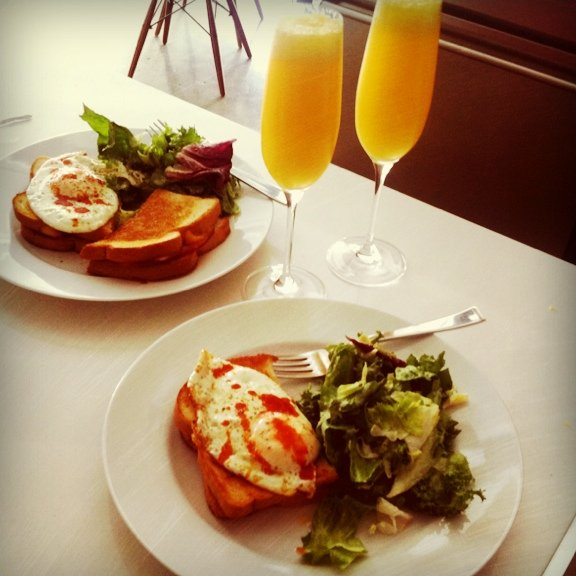
A homemade brunch consisting of cooked eggs on toast and salad, accompanied by orange juice

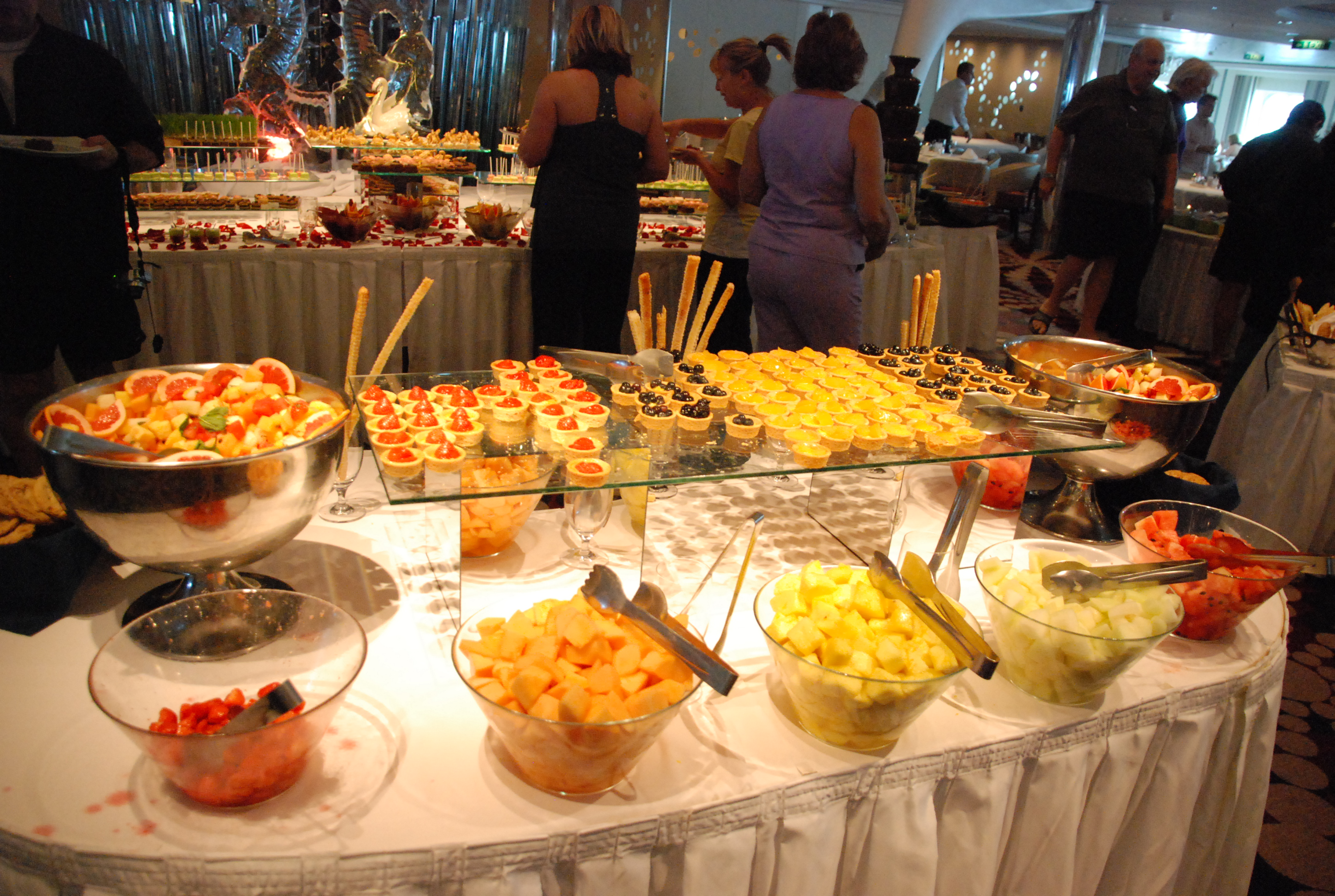
A formal brunch buffet aboard the Celebrity Equinox

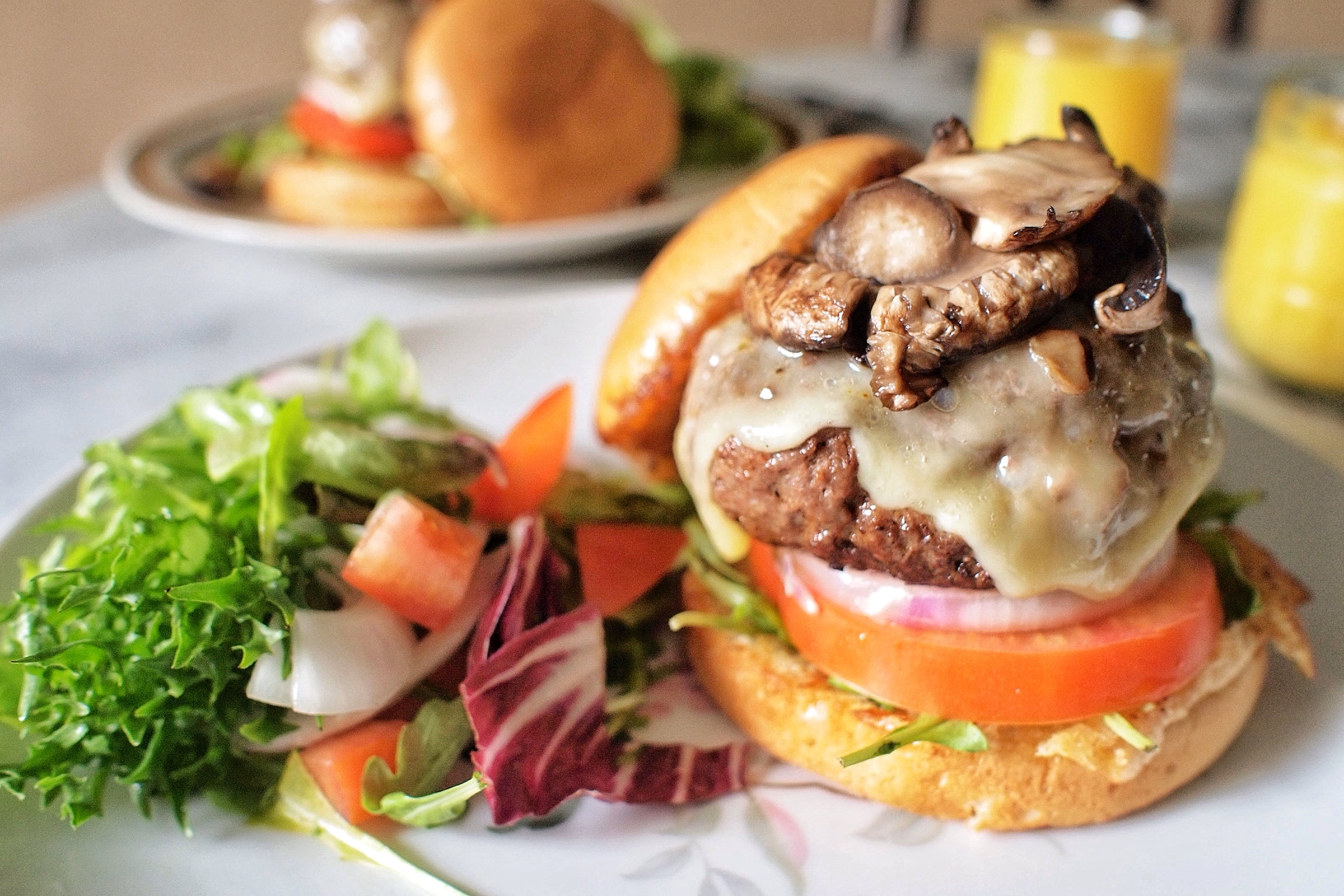
Cheeseburger as brunch

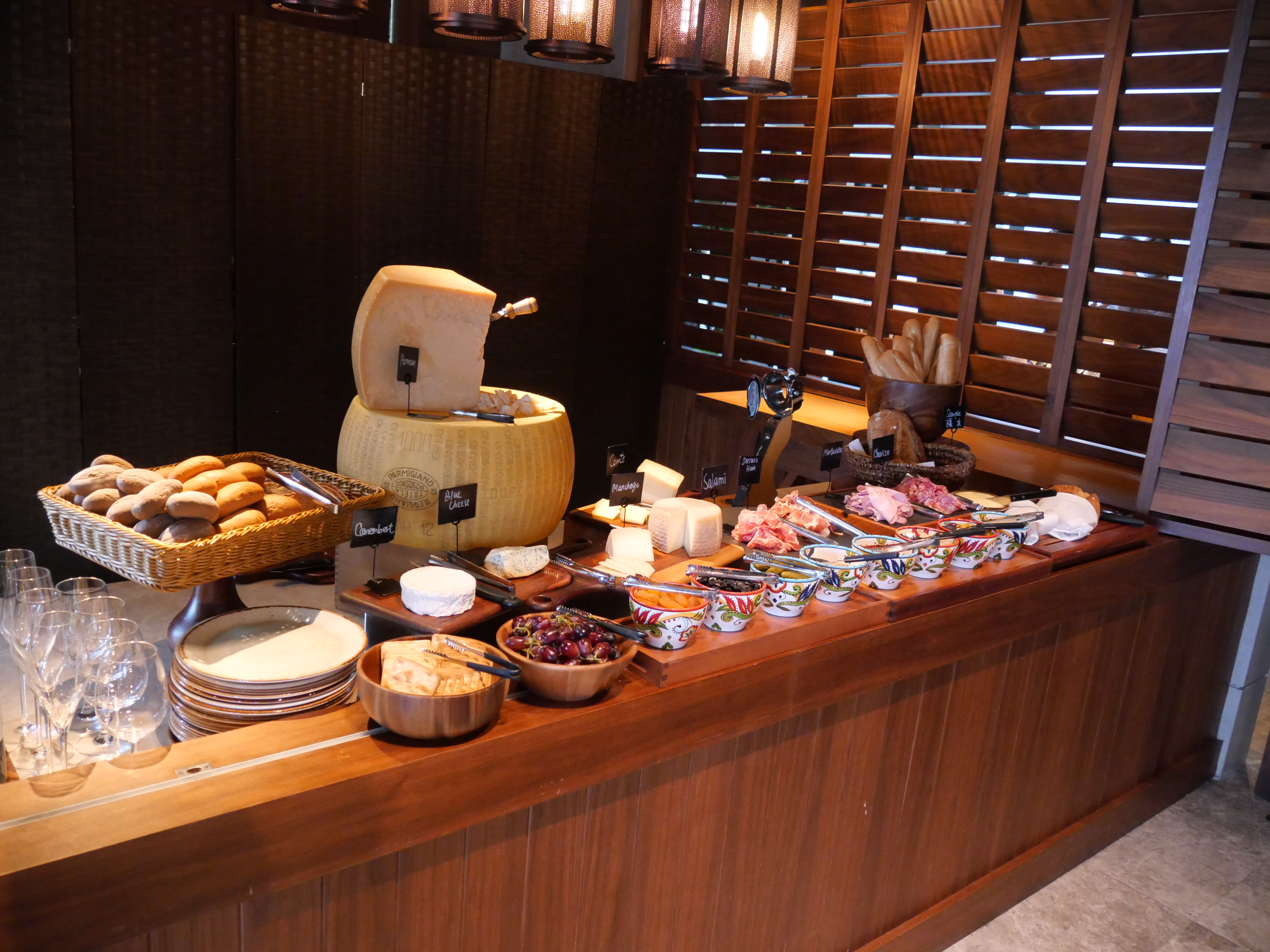
Coldcuts and cheeses with bread in a brunch buffet

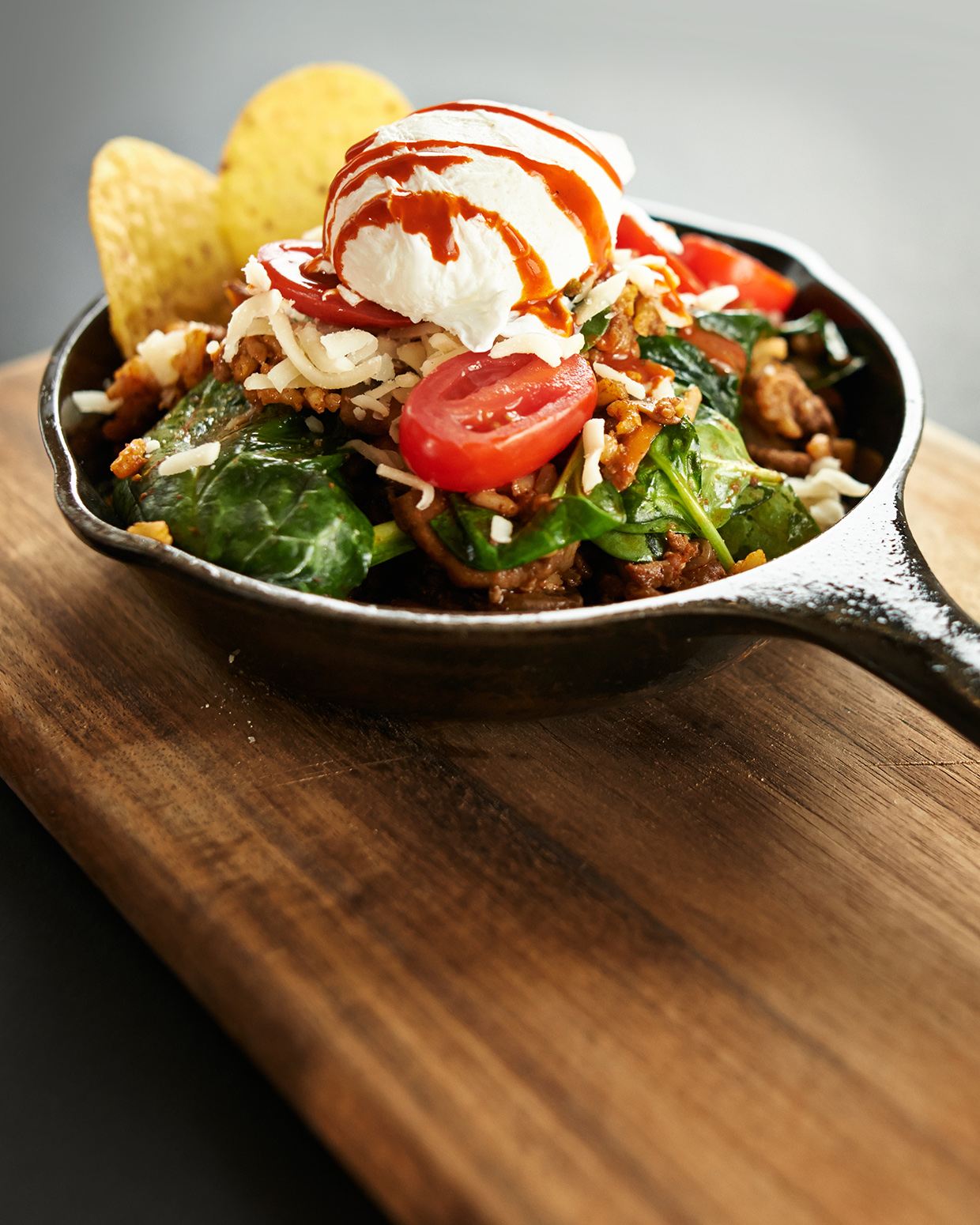
Huevos rancheros as brunch

== See also ==
- Drag brunch
- Elevenses
- Israeli breakfast
- List of breakfast topics
- List of brunch foods
- Second breakfast
