= Outline of meals =

Eating that takes place at a specific times

The following outline is provided as an overview of and topical guide to meals:

Meal – eating occasion that takes place at a certain time and includes specific, prepared food, or the food eaten on that occasion. The names used for specific meals in English vary greatly, depending on the speaker's culture, the time of day, or the size of the meal. Meals occur primarily at homes, restaurants, and cafeterias, but may occur anywhere. Regular meals occur on a daily basis, typically several times a day. Special meals are usually held in conjunction with such occasions as birthdays, weddings, anniversaries, and holidays. A meal is different from a snack in that meals are generally larger, more varied, and more filling than snacks. Meals are composed of one or more courses, which in turn are composed of one or more dishes.

== Types of meals ==
=== 3 main meals of the day ===
- Breakfast – eaten within an hour or two after a person wakes in the morning. (Index)
  - Full breakfast –
  - Midnight breakfast –
- Lunch – eaten around mid-day, usually between 11 am and 3 pm. In some areas, the name for this meal depends on its content.
  - Box lunch – Lunch that is packed in a box (in the United Kingdom and Commonwealth nations, this is known as a Packed Lunch, especially when in reference to a lunch taken to the workplace or place of education)
- Supper – Consumed in the evening. In some areas, the name for this meal depends on its content, but many English-speakers use "Tea" or "Dinner" for this meal, regardless of size.
  - Dinner party –
  - Full course dinner – in its simplest form, it can consist of three or four courses, such as soup, salad, main course and dessert. In formal dining, a full course dinner can consist of many courses, and in some instances the courses are carefully planned to complement each other gastronomically.

=== Types of meals, in the order served throughout the day ===
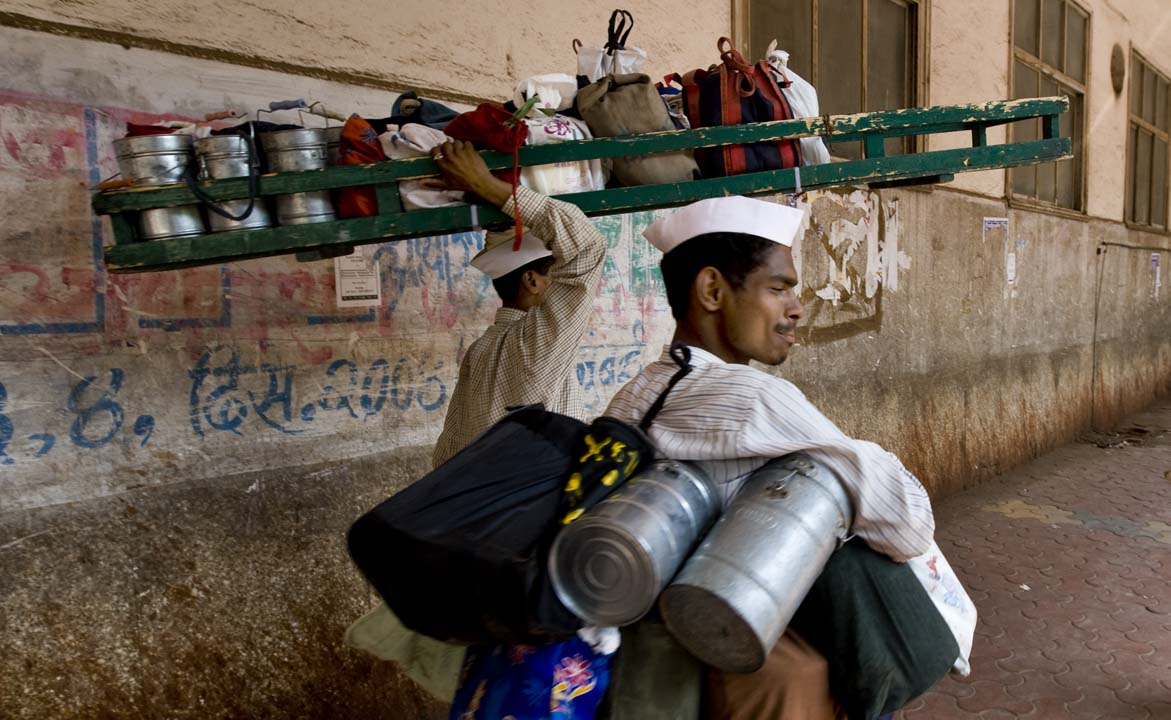
A dabbawala in Mumbai with meals packed in tiffin carriers

- Breakfast – meal eaten in the morning, usually before 10:00 am. Later meals can involve breakfast food but are usually not considered breakfast.
- Second breakfast – small meal eaten after breakfast, but before lunch. It is traditional in Bavaria, in Poland, and in Hungary. In Bavaria or Poland, special dishes are made exclusively to be eaten during second breakfast. In Vienna and most other parts of Austria the second breakfast is referred to as Jause.
  - Tiffin – second breakfast or light lunch, most commonly in India. "Tiffin" can also refer to boxed or packaged lunches eaten outside the home, such as those that are delivered by dabbawalas in Mumbai to workers in the city.
- Brunch – combination of breakfast and lunch eaten usually during the late morning but it can extend to as late as 3 pm. The word is a portmanteau of breakfast and lunch. It is usually larger than a breakfast and usually replacing both breakfast and lunch; it is most common on Sundays. Brunch originated in England in the late 1800s, and in the 1930s became popular in the United States.
- Elevenses (also called "morning tea") – light snack and drink taken in the late morning after breakfast and before lunch.
- Lunch – midday meal of varying size depending on the culture. The origin of the words lunch and luncheon relate to a small meal originally eaten at any time of the day or night, but during the 20th century gradually focused toward a small or mid-sized meal eaten at midday. Lunch is the second meal of the day after breakfast. Luncheon is now considered a formal lunch.
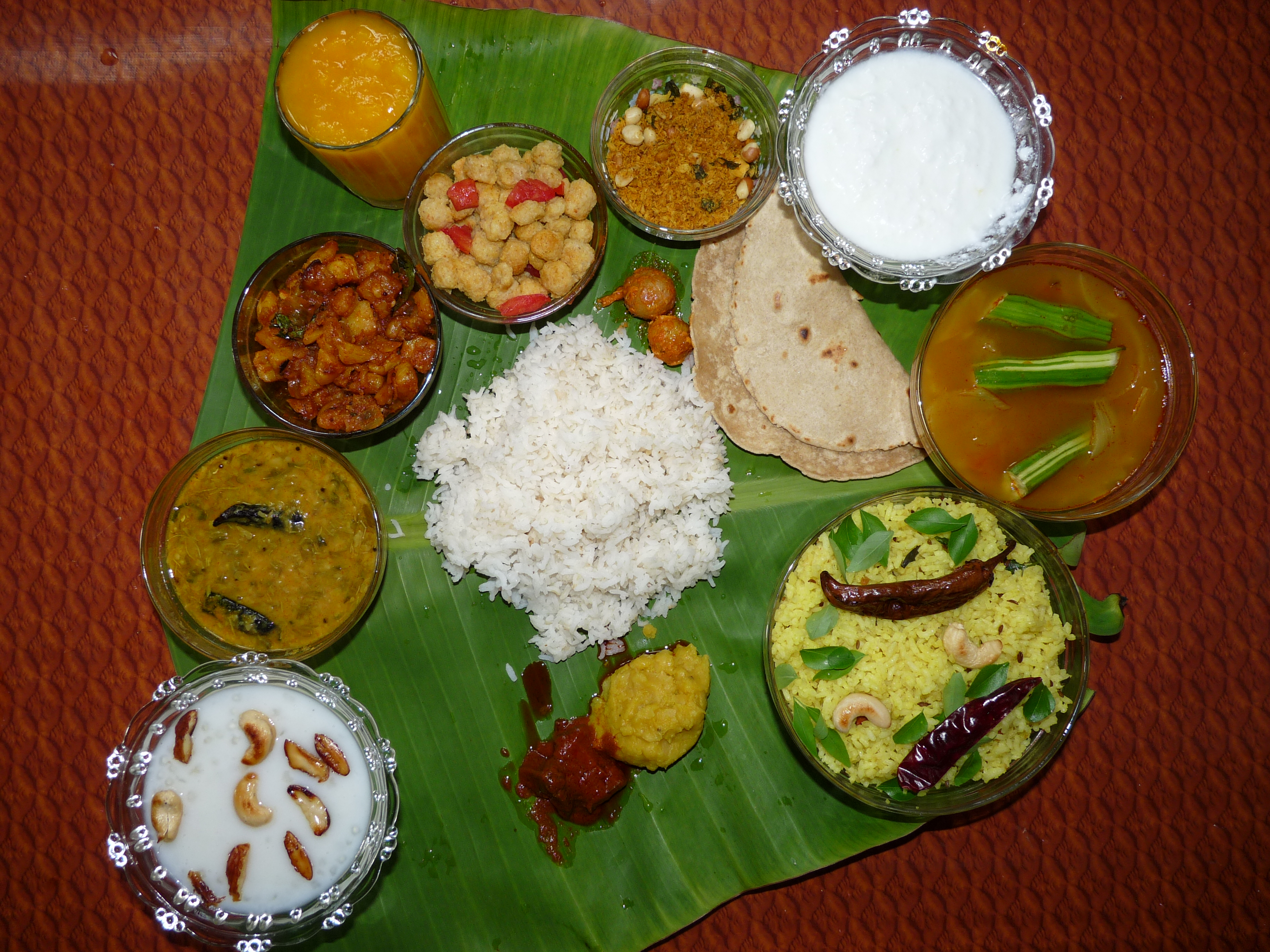
- Typical south Indian Andhra style combo meal, India
  Tea – any of several different meals or mealtimes, depending on a country's customs and its history of drinking tea. However, in those countries where the term's use is common, the influences are generally those of the former British Empire (now the Commonwealth of Nations). Tea as a meal can be small or large.

- Afternoon tea – mid-afternoon meal, typically taken at 4 pm, consisting of light fare such as small sandwiches, individual cakes and scones with tea.

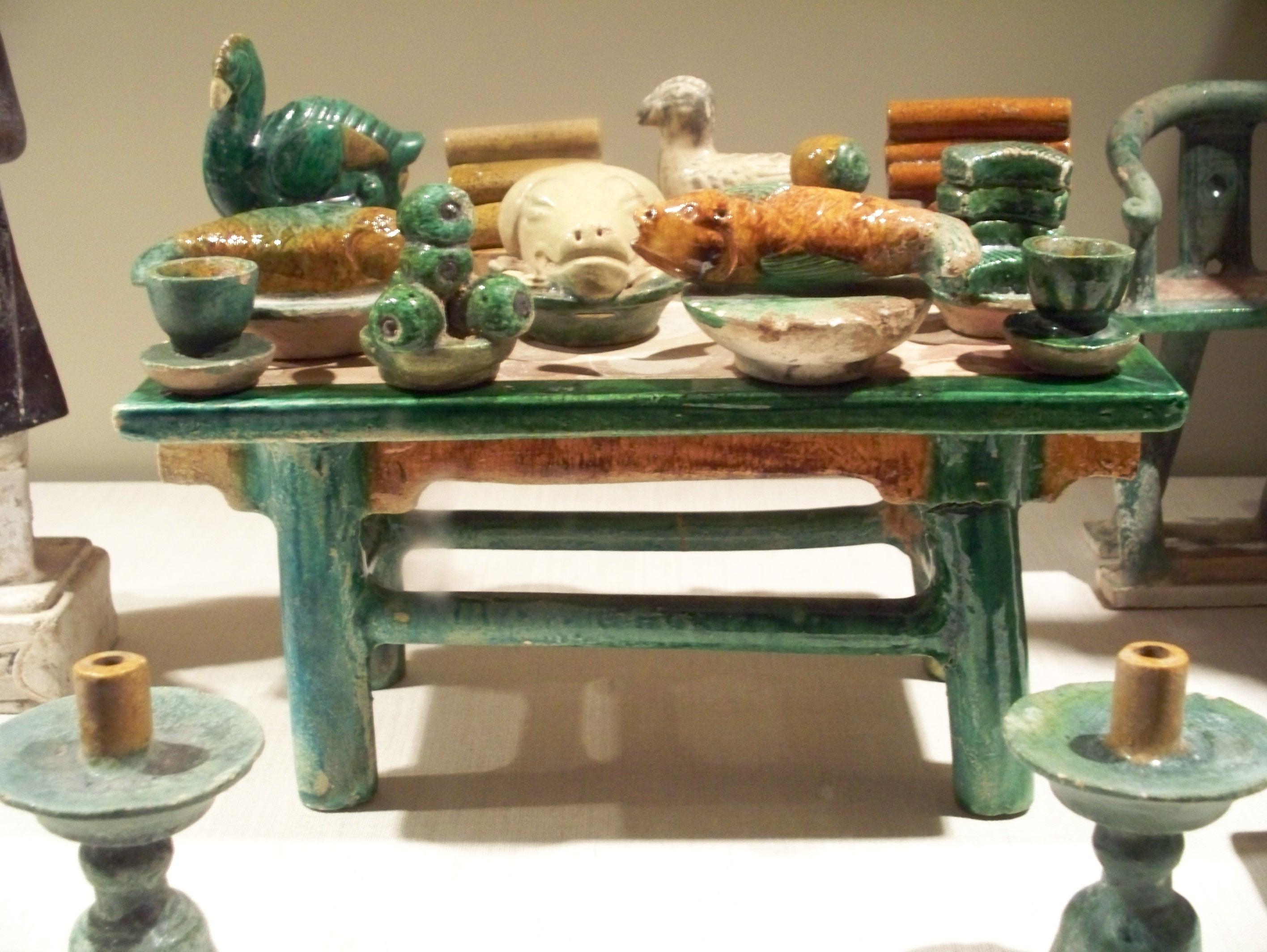
Ceramic meal in a Ming Dynasty burial figurine table

- High tea – British meal usually eaten in the early evening.
- Merienda – the equivalent of afternoon tea in Southern Europe and Latin America.

- Linner/Lupper/Dunch/Dinch/Lund – Not in general use. Linner is a late lunch or almost dinner meal. The name comes in reference to brunch, being a combination of the words "lunch" and "dinner" or "supper." Dunch comes in reference to brunch, being a combination of "dinner and "lunch." An alternate historical term is Russin.
- Dinner – Usually the largest and most elaborate meal of the day, which can replace either lunch, high tea, or supper. However, the term "dinner" can have many different meanings depending on the culture; it may mean a meal of any size eaten at any time of day. Historically, in British culture, dinner was taken at midday for children and manual workers; in the early evening for office workers; and in the late evening by the wealthier elements of society. During the latter half of the 20th century there has been a cultural shift towards everyone having the main meal in the late evening. The meaning as the evening meal, now generally the largest of the day, is becoming standard in most parts of the English-speaking world.
- Supper – light meal eaten in the late evening; as early as 7pm or as late as midnight. Usually eaten when the main meal of the day is taken at lunchtime or high tea.
- High Tea - a light meal consisting of tea, bread, vegetables, cheese and occasionally meat. Variations on high tea could include the addition of pies, potatoes and crackers. High tea is generally eaten late in the evening from around 8pm
- Siu yeh – late-night or overnight meal usually after dinner, may start anywhere from 9 pm onwards to 4 am. It is popular in Hong Kong, Taiwan, some parts of southern mainland China and amongst students in India.
- Midnight snack (feast) – late-night or early morning meal popular among people with pre-sleep hunger pangs, late-night revelers, and insomniacs. Sometimes called 'fourth meal', a name introduced by Taco Bell aimed towards gamers and stoners who are often afflicted by late hour cravings or 'the munchies.'

=== Styles of meal ===
==== Styles of meal, by format ====
- Airline meal – A meal served on an airplane.
- Banquet – large, formal, elaborate meal, with many guests and dishes.
- Barbecue – meal at which food (often meat or fish) is cooked out-of-doors on an open fire or portable grill.
- Blue-plate special – term used in the United States by restaurants that refers to a specially low-priced meal, usually changing daily.
- Buffet / Smörgåsbord – typically involves patrons serving themselves from foods placed in a public area. Buffets are effective for serving large numbers of people at once, and are often seen in institutional settings, such as business conventions or large parties. Some restaurants also offer buffets such as; lunch buffets, different cultural buffets, Simple Buffet, Station-type buffet, Modified deluxe buffet, Deluxe buffet, and other specific buffet restaurants.
- Collation –
- Family meal –
- Field ration –
  - Meal, Ready-to-Eat –
- Haute cuisine –
- Kaiseki –
- Kids' meal – A smaller, typically cheaper meal available for children at restaurants, fast-food chains and other eateries. Kid's meals will sometimes be accompanied with toys or activity items to appeal to/engage children dining with family.
- Meals on Wheels – meals delivered as a service to the homes of people who are unable to prepare their own.
- Multicourse meal – meal of multiple dishes served in sequence.
  - Full course dinner – in its simplest form, it can consist of three or four courses, such as soup, salad, meat and dessert. In formal dining, a full course dinner can consist of many courses, and in some instances the courses are carefully planned to complement each other gastronomically.
  - Main course – featured or primary dish in a meal consisting of several courses. It usually follows the entrée ("entry") course. In the United States it may in fact be called "entree."
- Picnic – outdoor meal where one brings one's food, such as a sandwich or a prepared meal (sometimes in a picnic basket). It often takes place in a natural or recreational area, such as a park, forest, beach, or lawn. On long drives a picnic may take place at a roadside stop such as a rest area. Picnics are often consumed on a picnic table.
- Platter –
- Potluck – gathering of people where each person or group of people may contribute a dish of food prepared by the person or the group of people, to be shared among the group.
- School meal –
- "TV dinner" –
- Value meal –
- Yum cha – Cantonese morning or afternoon meal where dim sum dishes and tea are served. In the U.S. and U.K., the word dim sum is often used in place of yum cha.

==== Styles of meal, by cuisine ====
Styles of meal, by cuisine – some examples of meals by cooking style, such as ethnic or regional meals include:

- Dal bhat –
- Fish fry –
- Hog fry –
- Jiggs dinner –
- Mixed grill –
- New England boiled dinner –
- Plate lunch –
- Ploughman's lunch –
- Sunday roast –
- Thali –

=== Meals for religious occasions ===
Hinduism

- Prasada – a consecrated food offering at any temple.
- Bhandara – a free feast served to everyone

==== Christianity ====
- Twelve-dish Christmas Eve supper – festive meal served on Christmas Eve.

==== Islam ====
- Eid al-Fitr – festive meal served on Eid al-Fitr.
- Suhur – meal consumed before dawn by Muslims prior to fasting at the Islamic month of Ramadan.
- Iftar – meal consumed after dusk by Muslims after breaking the fast at the Islamic month of Ramadan.

==== Sikhism ====
- Langar – communal vegetarian meal of which anyone may eat.

=== Meals for special occasions ===
- Bull roast –
- Communal meal –
- Deipnon –
- Free lunch –
- Last meal – meal served to a prisoner before their execution.
- Pig roast –
- Réveillon – celebratory long dinner held on Christmas Eve in French-speaking countries.
- Sacred meal – such as the Eucharist, a form of theophagy or symbolic rite.
- Wedding-related meals
  - Rehearsal dinner – a pre-wedding ceremony in North American tradition, usually held after the wedding rehearsal and the night before the wedding ceremony.
  - Wedding reception –
    - Wedding breakfast – dinner given to the bride, groom, and guests at the wedding reception that follows a wedding in the United Kingdom, Australia, Germany, Austria and Scandinavia.

== History of meals ==
- History of breakfast –
- History of lunch –
- History of dinner –
- Symbolic meal – such as were prepared for or represented in tombs, were designed for consumption by the deceased in the after-life. They are often represented in funerary art.
- Manchu Han Imperial Feast –

== Components of a meal ==
- Drink –
- Food –
  - Cuisine – food prepared in a particular way. A cuisine is a style of cooking characterized by distinctive ingredients, techniques and dishes, and usually associated with a specific culture or geographic region.
  - Course – specific set of food items that are served together during a meal, all at the same time. A course may include multiple dishes or only one, and often includes items with some variety of flavors. For instance, a hamburger served with fries would be considered a single course, and most likely the entire meal. See also full course dinner.
    - Hors d'oeuvre – literally "apart from the [main] work") or the first course, is a food item served before the main courses of a meal, typically smaller than main dishes, and often meant to be eaten by hand (with minimal use of cutlery). Hors d'oeuvres may be served at the dinner table as a part of the meal, or they may be served before seating.
    - Entrée – dish served before the main course, or between two principal courses of a meal.
    - Main course – featured or primary dish in a meal consisting of several courses. It usually follows the entrée ("entry") course. In the United States and parts of Canada, it may be called "entrée."
    - Dessert – typically sweet course that concludes an evening meal. The course usually consists of sweet foods, but may include other items. In world cultures there are a wide variety of desserts including cakes, tarts, cookies, biscuits, gelatins, pastries, ice creams, pies, puddings, custards, and sweet soups. Fruit is also commonly found in dessert courses because of its naturally occurring sweetness.
  - Dishes – specific food preparation, a "distinct article or variety of food", with cooking finished, and ready to eat, or be served. A "dish" may be served on tableware, or may be eaten out of hand; but breads are generally not called "dishes."
    - Types of dishes
      - Entrée – dish served before the main course, or between two principal courses of a meal.
      - Side dish – food item that accompanies the entrée or main course at a meal.
    - Styles of dishes
      - National dish – culinary dish that is strongly associated with a particular country., and are part of a nation's identity and self-image. A dish can be considered a national dish for a variety of reasons:
        - It is a staple food, made from a selection of locally available foodstuffs that can be prepared in a distinctive way, such as Fruits de mer, served along the west coast of France.
        - It contains a particular 'exotic' ingredient that is produced locally, such as the South American paprika grown in the European Pyrenees.
        - It is served as a festive culinary tradition that forms part of a cultural heritage—for example, barbecues at summer camp or fondue at dinner parties—or as part of a religious practice such as Korban Pesach or Iftar celebrations.
  - Bread – staple food prepared from a dough of flour and water, usually by baking. Throughout recorded history it has been popular around the world and is one of the oldest artificial foods, having been of importance since the dawn of agriculture. See List of breads.
  - Garnishes – items or substances used as a decoration or embellishment accompanying a prepared food dish or drink. In many cases, it may give added or contrasting flavor. Some garnishes are selected mainly to augment the visual impact of the plate, while others are selected specifically for the flavor they may impart.
  - Condiments – spice, sauce or other food preparation that is added to foods to impart a particular flavor, enhance its flavor, or in some cultures, to complement the dish. See List of condiments.
  - Leftovers –
  - Fast food – a type of mass-produced food designed for commercial resale, with a strong priority placed on speed of service.

== Meal-related activities ==
- Eating –
- Food service –
  - Table service –
    - Service à la française – practice of serving various dishes of a meal at the same time
    - Service à la russe – manner of dining that involves courses being brought to the table sequentially
- Meal preparation –
  - Food preparation –
    - Cooking –

== Meal venues ==
- Cafeteria –
- Dining room –
- Restaurant –
- Langar –
- Dhaba –
- Lori –

== Meal implements ==
- Table –
  - Picnic table – modified table with attached benches, designed for eating a meal outdoors (picnicking).
- Chairs –
- Tableware –
- Glassware –
- Eating utensils –

== Aspects of a meal ==
- Menu –

- À la carte –
- Table d'hôte –
- Tasting menu –

- Nutrition –

=== Meal structure, by type of cuisine ===
- Meal structure in Arab cuisine
- Meal structure in Aztec cuisine
- Meal structure in Bengali cuisine
- Meal structure in Danish cuisine
- Meal structure in Dutch cuisine
- Meal structure in English cuisine
- Meal structure in French cuisine
- Meal structure in German cuisine
- Meal structure in Iranian (Persian) cuisine
- Meal structure in Italian cuisine
- Meal structure in Moroccan cuisine
- Meal structure in Lithuanian cuisine
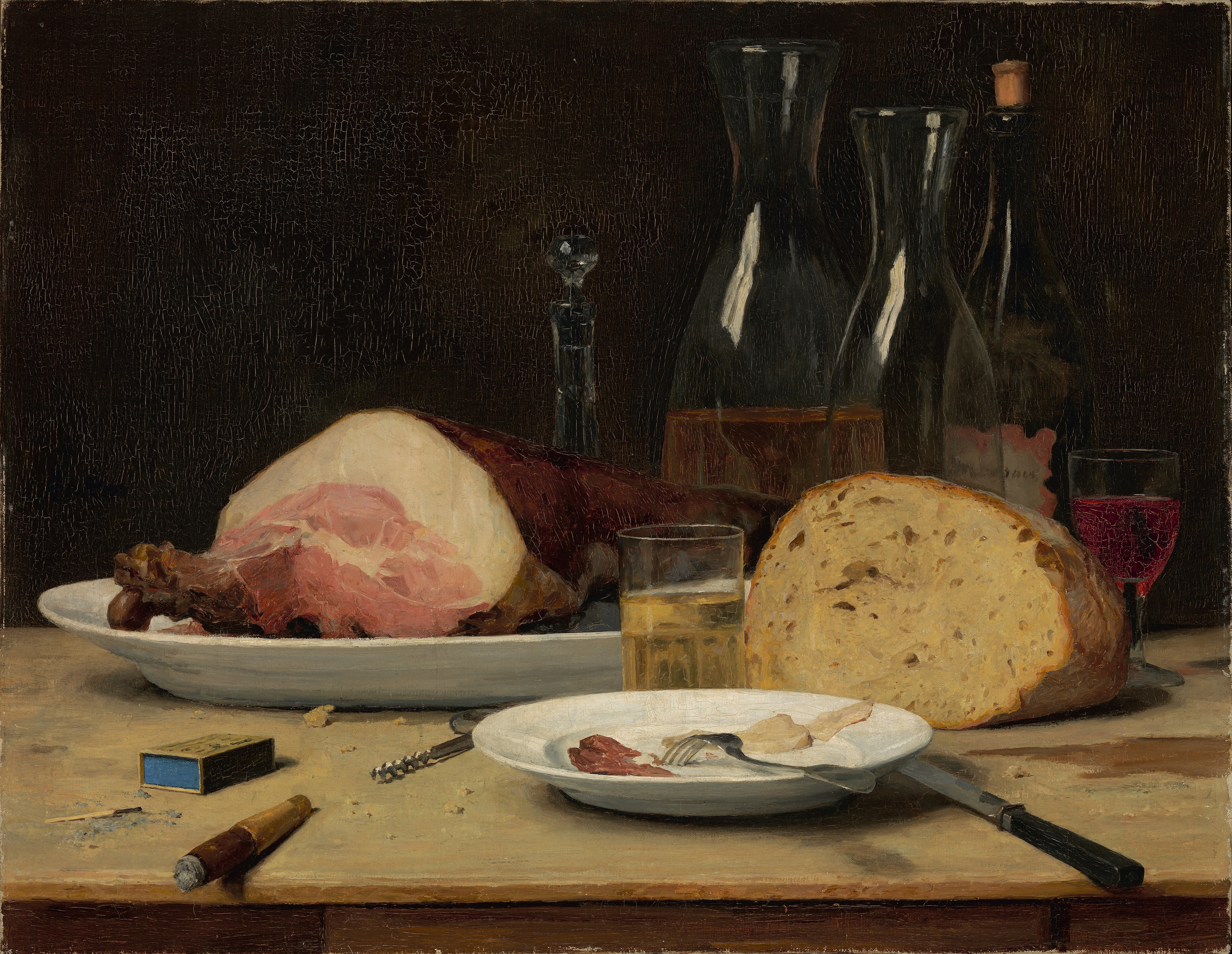
Simple meals often consist of bread or meat or as here, both together Albert Anker, Still life Excess (1896)

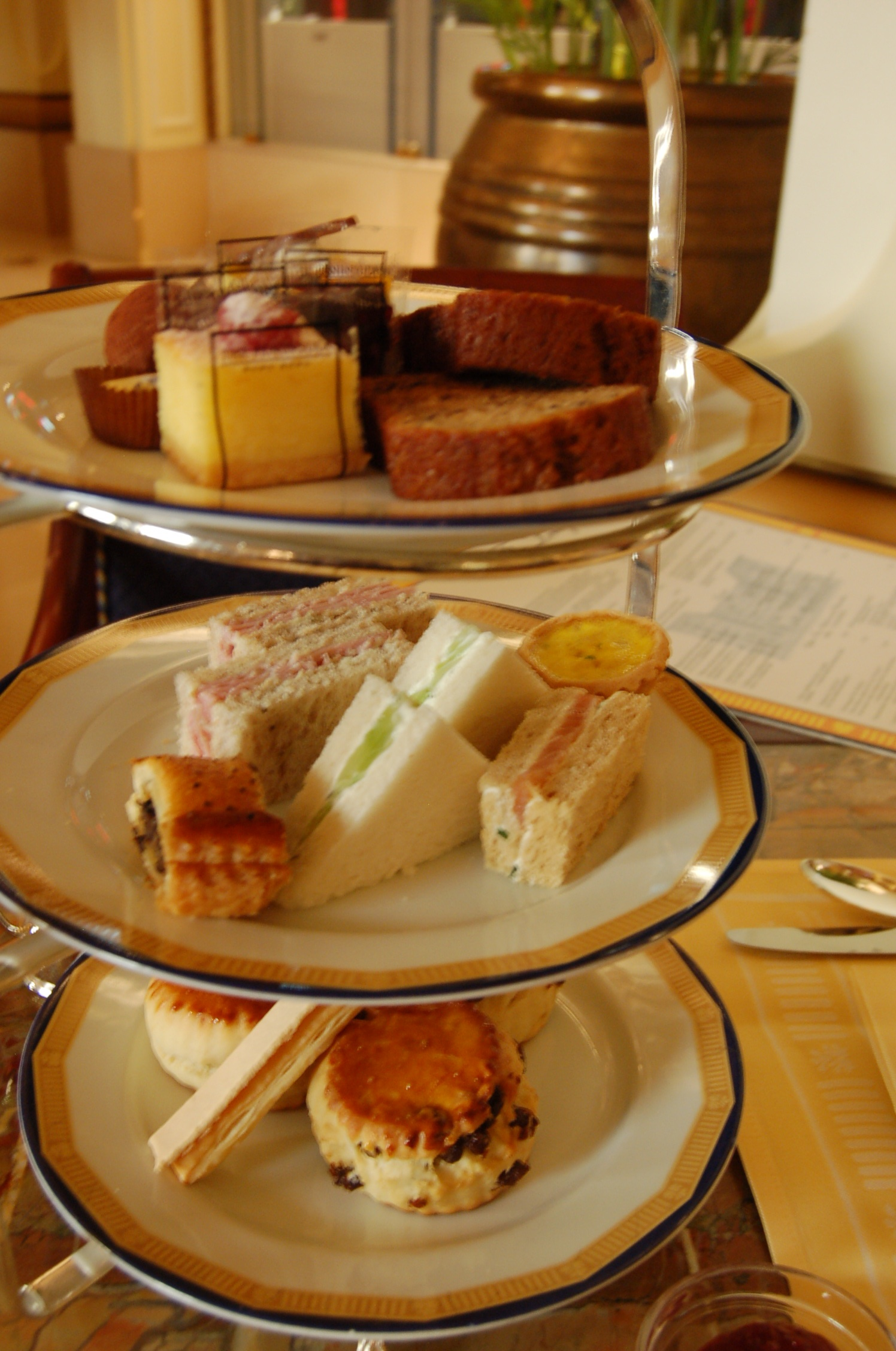
Afternoon tea

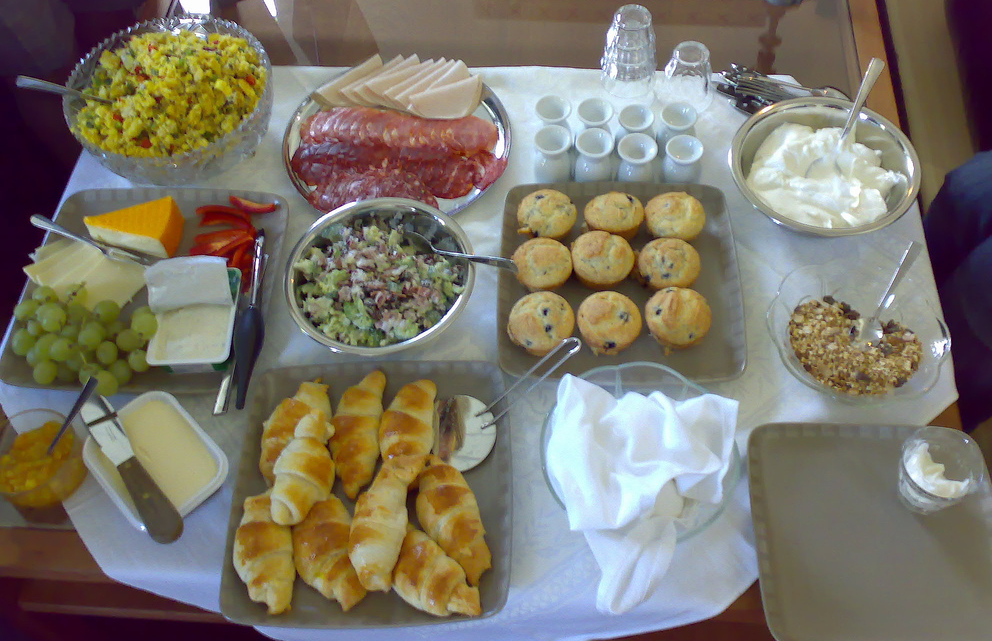
Brunch foods

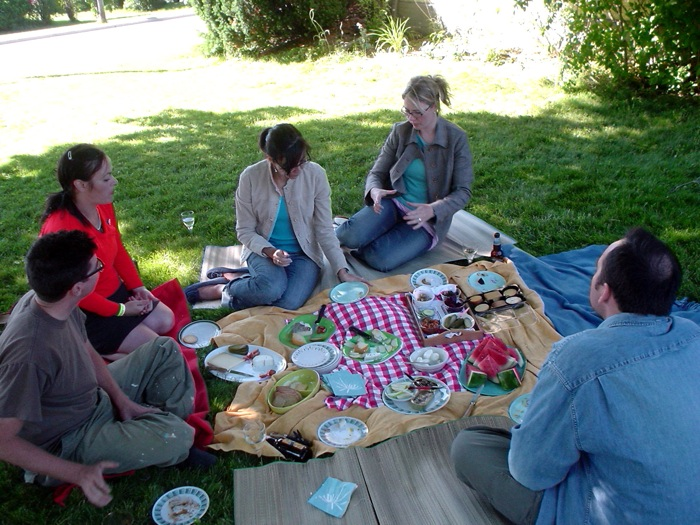
People enjoying a picnic

== See also ==
- Gastronomy
