= Siu yeh =

Late night meal

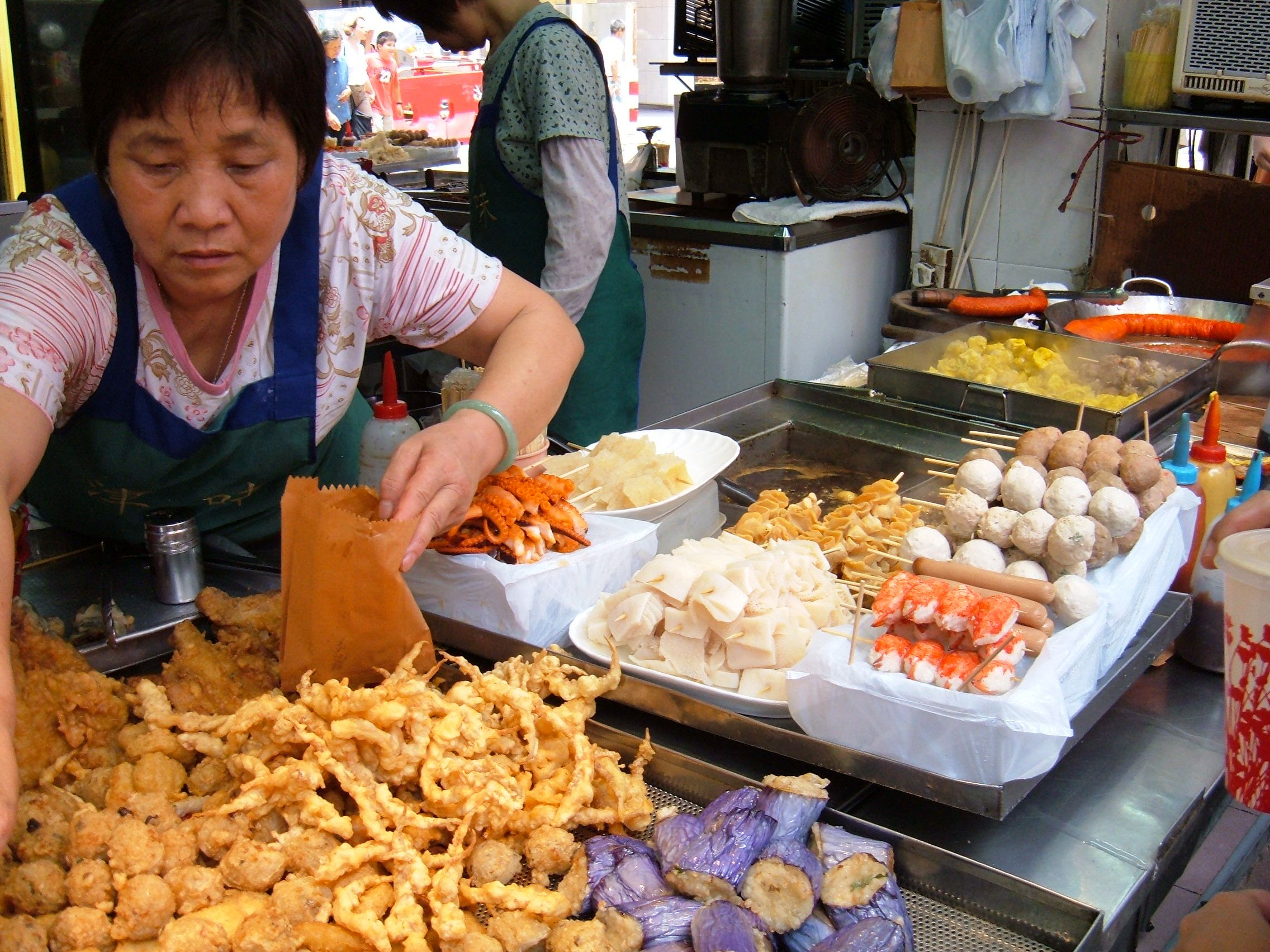
- A snack shop in Causeway Bay, Hong Kong selling snacks for siu yeh
- Traditional Chinese: 宵 夜
- Simplified Chinese: 宵 夜
- Cantonese Yale: sīu yé
- Literal meaning: overnight (宵) night (夜)
Transcriptions
Standard Mandarin
- Hanyu Pinyin: xiāo yè
Yue: Cantonese
- Yale Romanization: sīu yé
- Jyutping: siu1 je2

Siu yeh (Chinese: 宵夜; Jyutping: siu1 je2; Cantonese Yale: sīu yé; pinyin: xiāoyè), also called xiao ye, is a late-night meal in the food culture of southern China. It is particularly associated with the cuisine of Hong Kong. It comes after dinner and is similar to supper; siu yeh is usually served in individual portions. For people working late-night shifts, siu yeh is also associated with their post-midnight meals.
