= Class marker =

Class marker may refer to:

- Class marker (sociology), a discernible sign indicating the social class identity
- Class marker (morphology), a part of word that determines its class
