= Social class differences in food consumption =

Aspect of food politics

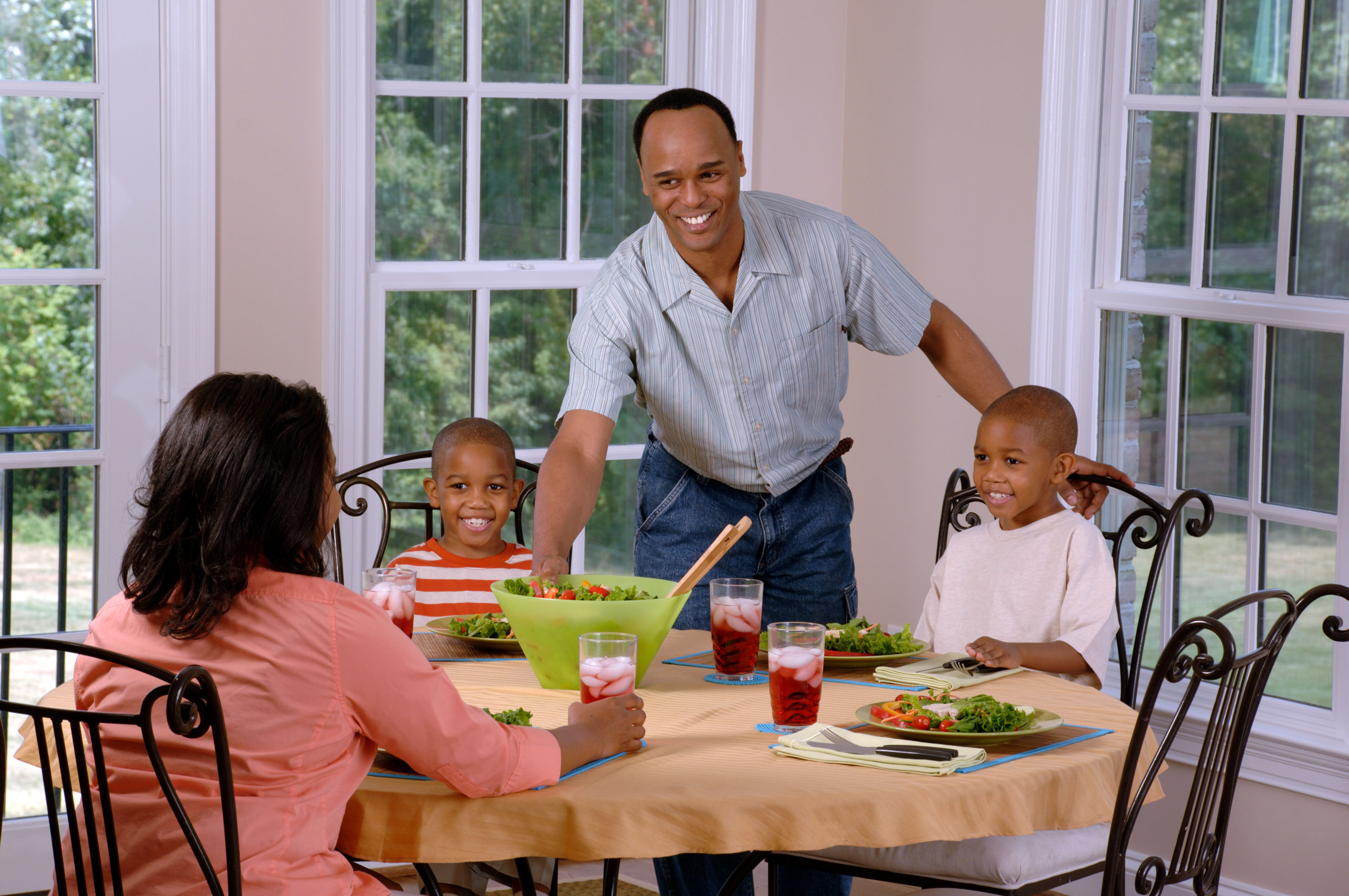
An African American family eating a meal in a middle or upper middle class setting. African American communities often have other elements of distinctive food culture that is not just determined by class.

Social class differences in food consumption refers to how the quantity and quality of food varies according to a person's social status or position in the social hierarchy. Various disciplines, including social, psychological, nutritional, and public health sciences, have examined this topic. Social class can be examined according to defining factors — education, income, or occupational status — or subjective components, like perceived rank in society. The food represents a demarcation line for the elites, a "social marker", throughout the history of the humanity.

Eating behavior is a highly affiliative act, thus the food one eats is closely tied with one's social class throughout history. In contemporary Western society, social class differences in food consumption follow a general pattern. Upper class groups consume foods that signify exclusivity and access to rare goods; while lower class groups, on the other hand, consume foods that are readily available.

== Upper class diets ==
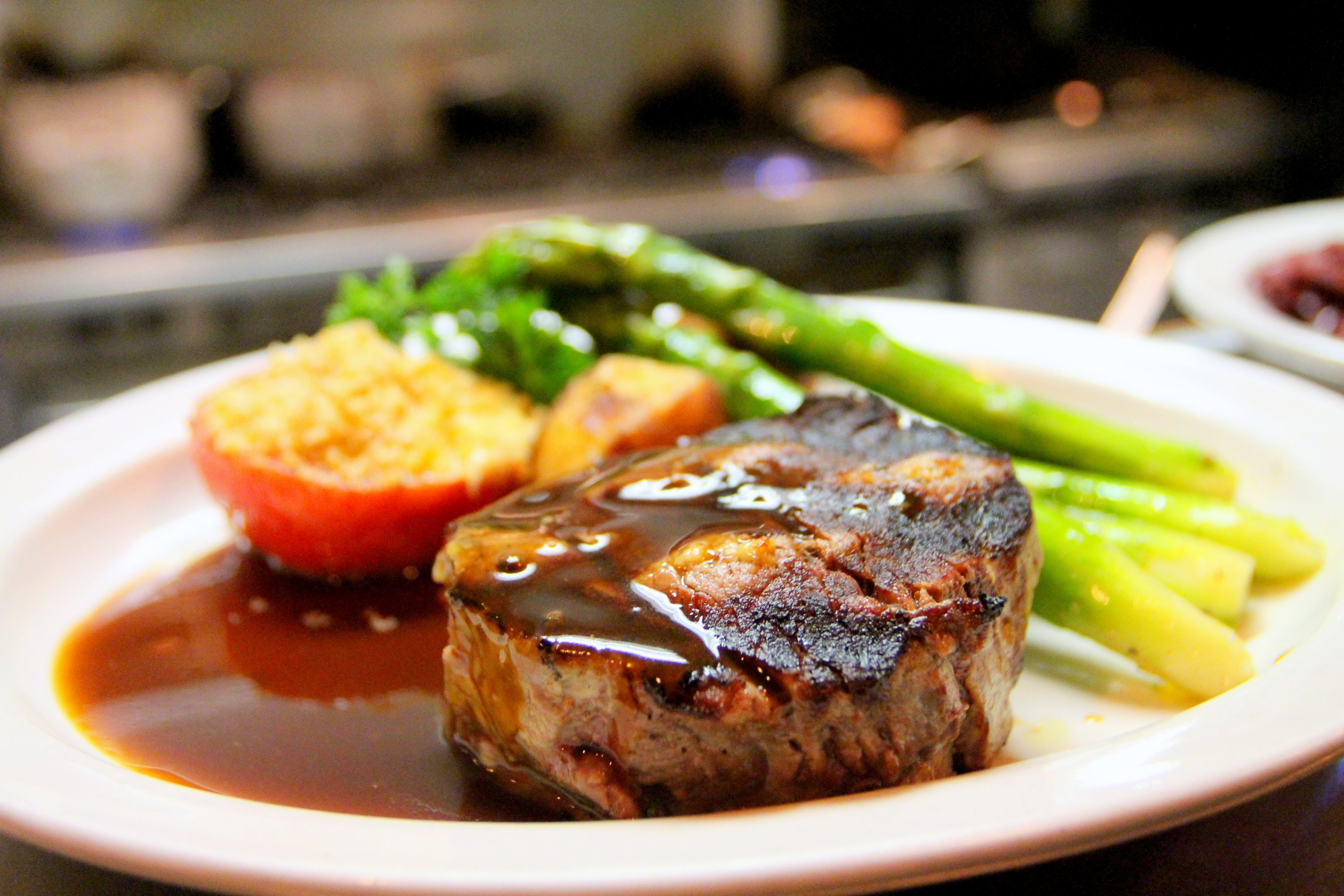
Luxury food typical for high end restaurant (Steak with asparagus). Restaurant food often plays a role in determining the characteristics of upper class cuisine.

=== Exclusivity ===
Like any luxury product, some foods denote a sense of class and distinction. According to French sociologist Pierre Bourdieu, the food consumed by the upper classes reflect "tastes of refinement", and its perceived value in society. Historically, these were highly exclusive food items, which were marked by high demand and low supply.

One clear illustration of this phenomenon is the introduction of spices in European diet. In medieval Western Europe, the amount of meat consumed distinguished the upper from the lower classes, as only upper class groups could afford to eat meat in large quantities. The diet of lower class groups, who had little access to meat, mostly consisted of grains (e.g., barley and rye) and vegetables (e.g. cabbage and carrots). Spices, such as black pepper, were introduced as meat seasoning—albeit in small quantities— following initial contact with Asia. The high cost of transporting these spices limited access to the rich; thus, both the amount and type of meat consumed became a signal of status.

=== Omnivorism ===
Omnivorism, a term typically reserved for those who consume a non-restricted variety of food products, may also refer to the consumption of rare or foreign foods. Consuming unfamiliar foods, especially foods from different cultures, signifies a sense of worldliness that can only be obtained through social and economic capital. There is some documented evidence for this claim: Upper class groups, relative to lower class groups, were more likely to endorse eating foods that were outside of their native culture and show a preoccupation for the perceived authenticity of foreign cuisine, preferring dine-in establishments over fast food chains.

=== Nutritional quality ===
Finally, the nutritional quality of Western upper class diets is typically better than those of lower class diets. Several studies have found that with increased education and income, diet quality improved. Even subjective measures of social status, such as the MacArthur Subjective Social Status Scale, exert a similar effect on eating behavior among minority groups. Those who see themselves as having a higher position in society were more likely to report better health.

=== Better access to healthy foods ===
Greater income plays an important role in accessing healthy foods. This is especially true in the United States compared to other high-income countries. According to a 2023 survey, 61.5% of respondents consider healthy food to be a luxury. Most health food stores and supermarkets, which carry fresh produce, are more readily available in high-income areas compared to low-income areas. Turrell and colleagues noted that income, as opposed to education and occupational status, was the only significant indicator of low-income groups purchasing foods that met recommended dietary guidelines. Said differently, it was money—not more years of education nor the prestige of one's job— that allowed low-income groups to achieve a healthy diet.

A significant body of evidence shows how healthy foods cost more than unhealthy foods. Nevertheless, scholars have not been able to identify specific micronutrients (i.e., vitamins, minerals) and macronutrients (i.e., carbohydrates, fat) that consistently contribute to the inflated price of a healthy diet. One analysis of food expenditure in the United States demonstrated that the relationship between the price of a food item and its nutritional quality varied according to how the price of food was measured. The price of vegetables, for example, cost nearly twice as much when measured as "price per 100 calories" than when it was measured as "price per edible gram" or "price average portion" (roughly $3.75/100 calories vs. $1.60 and $1.40, respectively). Others have noted that the price of certain fruits and vegetables are dropping at the same rate as popular snack foods, such as chips and cookies.

=== Higher education and nutritional analysis ===
Higher education is related to a better diet and is thought to improve eating behaviors by increasing susceptibility to health messages. Nutritional literacy and numeracy refers to the ability to understand and use nutrition labels to guide eating behaviors. Higher social class groups report using nutrition labels at a greater rate than low social class groups, but in general, rates of nutrition label use is low. It estimated that only a third of Americans use nutrition labels. Importantly, a vast majority of published studies evaluating the effects of nutrition label use and food consumption did not include other racial/ethnic minorities in their samples, nor did the studies meet the American Dietetic Association standard of reporting. Thus, the extent to which nutrition label use affects the American population, at large, remains in question.

== Middle class diets ==
The defining characteristics of middle class diets are less obvious than those of high and low class groups. For one, most researchers struggle to define "middle class". Is it solely a socioeconomic position (i.e., median income, distance from the federal poverty level) or is it a psychological state of mind (i.e., self-perception and culture)? Likewise, middle class diets are subject to the same ambiguity.

The middle class are the biggest consumers of fast food in the United States. Yet, nutritional quality of middle class diets closely mirrors those of the upper classes. More importantly, the nutritional quality of the middle and upper classes is expected to significantly diverge from the lower classes over time.

One way to look at middle class diets is that it reflects an aspirational pursuit of obtaining a higher social standing. Sociological theorist, Gabriel Tarde, suggested that "inferior" classes seek to mimic the culture of the "superior" classes. This is becoming more apparent as conspicuous consumption is on the decline. According to sociologist, Thorstein Veblen, conspicuous consumption is the audacious display of wealth to mark one's social standing. Rapid globalization and online markets have made once-exclusive consumer goods accessible to the middle class American; and, as a result, upper classes have turned away from ostentatious indicators of wealth. Instead, the upper classes have invested in inconspicuous forms of consumption, such as advanced education.

Elizabeth Currid-Halkett, author of The Sum of Small Things: A Theory of the Aspirational Class, suggests that the consumption of organic foods is one way that both the upper and the middle classes engage in inconspicuous consumption. Buying and eating organic foods not only requires a certain degree of expendable money, but it also suggests that the middle class consumer possesses some nutritional knowledge and the ability to access the same grocery markets as the rich. Others note that the middle class also engages in the same upper class practices of eating out and eating foreign foods to display their cultural capital.

== Lower class diets ==
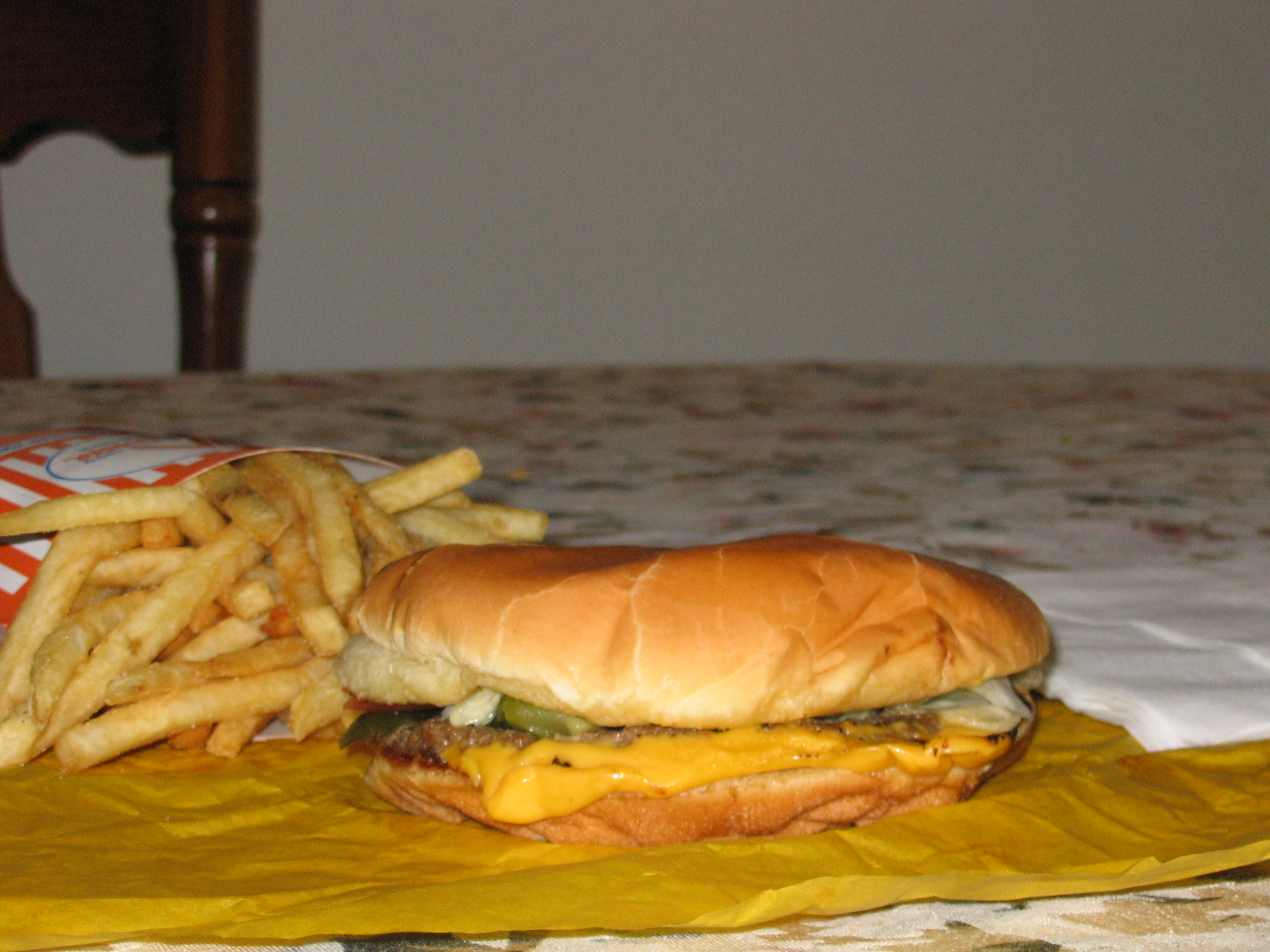
A takeaway cheeseburger. Fast food and inexpensive processed convenience foods are common in working class households where economic insecurity and restraints in access to nutritious foods, skills and time to cook often lead to less healthy food options.

In the United States, one way of defining low social class is reporting an income level lower than the federal poverty threshold. According to the U.S. Federal Poverty Guidelines, a family of four (i.e., two adults and two children under 18) that earns less than $25,750 is considered living below the federal poverty line as of 2019. About 38.1 million Americans live in poverty. However, some argue that this might be an underestimation as the current guidelines do not account for other expenses, such as childcare, transportation, tax, or medical bills.

Nevertheless, having less income requires families to choose generally unhealthy foods to meet basic needs. Low income families do not regularly meet the required daily servings of nutrient-rich foods, such as fruits, vegetables, and whole grains, and this issue spans far beyond the United States. Globally, low income is related to poor micronutrient intake.

In the US, the United States Department of Agriculture developed a set of guidelines designed to help all Americans meet their nutritional needs. In particular, the Thrifty Food Plan was designed to help low-income groups identify time-efficient, budget-friendly foods that met nutritional standards. Additionally, the Supplemental Nutrition Assistance Program (SNAP), formally the Food Stamp Act of 1977, is a government-funded program that provides low-income Americans with subsidies to purchase foods.

=== Common diet ===
Fatty meats, potatoes, pasta, canned corn, rice and cereal are among the most common foods purchased by many low income families. About 50% of low-income U.S. adults report eating unhealthy or expired foods, and among food bank patrons, the most requested items are dairy products, fruits and vegetables, and lean meat.

=== Economic perspectives ===
==== Food insecurity ====
Food insecurity refers to economic or social conditions that contribute to inconsistent or inadequate access to food. Roughly 43 million American households are impacted by food insecurity and this insecurity disproportionately affects low-income, racial/ethnic minority, and single parent households.

Food insecurity plays a large role in the formation of diets and diet quality. In urban areas, vast income inequality makes purchasing healthy foods more difficult for low-income groups, especially among racial minorities. In rural areas, low-income groups have less access to healthy foods than high income groups. These so-called "food deserts" lack adequate grocery stores or markets that provide fresh and nutritious foods. Some note that food deserts also constitute regions where health foods are available but are expensive or inconsistently stocked. On the other hand, another issue facing many low-income communities is the growing prevalence of fast food restaurants, which pose major health risks.

==== Availability ====
Apart from taste, which is valued among all socioeconomic groups' food preferences, low-income groups prioritized the cost, convenience, and familiarity of their meals. On average, food insecurity and low income is associated with overeating high-calorie snack foods and carbohydrates and under-eating fruits and vegetables. One explanation for the discrepancy is a lack of time. Preparing and cooking raw fruits and vegetables requires more time than purchasing ready-made meals and snacks. This distinction is particularly important among those who have less expendable time, like single working mothers, who make up 10% of food insecure households. A study by the United States Department of Agriculture concluded that low income, full-time working women spend around 40 minutes a day preparing and cooking meals, compared to non-working women who spend around 70 minutes per day.

Considering that fast food chains are more prevalent among low-income areas than among middle- and high-income areas, consuming ready-made food allows time-strained individuals to meet both work and household demands. In fact, low-income households do spend more money on fast food as a result of their time constraints: Households that make less than $50,000 per year spend nearly 50% of their food expenditure on "foods away from home", or ready-to-eat foods that are available through public spaces (e.g., such as vending machines, restaurants, or schools). Generally, "foods away from home" are of lower nutritional quality than foods prepared at home.

However, low-income groups are not the only consumers of unhealthy foods. A report from the United States Department of Agriculture demonstrated that foods consumed at fast food restaurants constituted about 15% of one's daily caloric intake for both high- and low-income groups. Somewhat surprisingly, high-income groups actually consume more calories overall from "foods away from home" compared to low-income groups. This is accounted by differences in eating at dine-in restaurants, which are typically more expensive than fast food restaurants.

=== Psychological perspectives ===
==== Behavior ====
A main critique of studies examining food insecurity is the emphasis on economic restraints. Others have argued for a reform to address the negative psychological impact of poverty and food insecurity. The most common assessment of food insecurity in the United States, the U.S. Household Food Security Survey Module, is unable to account for the behavioral strategies that one may undertake to avoid being food insecure, such as limiting portion sizes or borrowing money. To address this gap, some have developed behavior-based measures of food insecurity.

==== Stress ====
There is emerging evidence that the psychological experiences of poverty and low status can directly influence the foods that one eats. Stress-induced eating, closely related to emotional eating, is quite common in the United States. One survey by the American Psychological Association found that nearly 40% of US adults reported overeating or eating unhealthily in response to stress.

Many scholars believe that stress is a key mechanism in the relationship between low social class and poor eating behaviors. In non-human models, animals that undergo subordination stress (e.g., attacks from a dominant animal in shared housing conditions) derive most of their caloric intake from fatty and sugary foods. It is possible that stress-induced eating serves an evolutionary adaptive function: Such that, stress motivates low status animals to seek out resources, such as food, that are in possession of and limited by high status animals. Thus, under conditions of low status, high-calorie foods have the prospect of expanding an uncertain lifespan.

Among humans, the evidence is a little less clear. Low status groups do have a poorer diet, and they do experience more stress compared to high status groups. On average, low status groups experience more daily life hassles, negative life events, and more workplace and family stressors. Further, the average stress levels for low status groups tend to increase at a greater rate than their high status counterparts. However, there is hardly any research to demonstrate how stress serves as a mechanism of poor eating behaviors among low-income groups, and leaves the phenomenon of stress-induced eating among low-income groups in question.

== Sources ==
- Anderson, E. N. (2020-12-31). "Me, Myself, and the Others: Food as Social Marker". Everyone Eats. New York University Press. pp. 171–187. doi:10.18574/nyu/9780814785768.003.0014. ISBN 978-0-8147-8576-8.
- Hupkens, Christianne L. H.; Knibbe, Ronald A.; Drop, Maria J. (2000-06-01). "Social class differences in food consumption. The explanatory value of permissiveness and health and cost considerations". The European Journal of Public Health. 10 (2). Oxford University Press (OUP): 108–113. doi:10.1093/eurpub/10.2.108. ISSN 1101-1262.
