= Kekefia =

Bayelsa Soup

Kekefia is a side-dish of the Southern part of Nigeria, the meal is popular among the people in Bayelsa state.

Plantain is the main ingredient for the making the food, others include pepper, Onion, crayfish scent leaf, palm oil and salt.

== Other foods ==
Kekefia is served with sauce containing meat or fish.
