= Meal preparation =

Process of planning and preparing meals

Meal preparation, sometimes called meal prep, is the process of planning and preparing meals while pre-packaging the meals to be eaten throughout the week.

category:mealpreparation

== Advance preparation ==
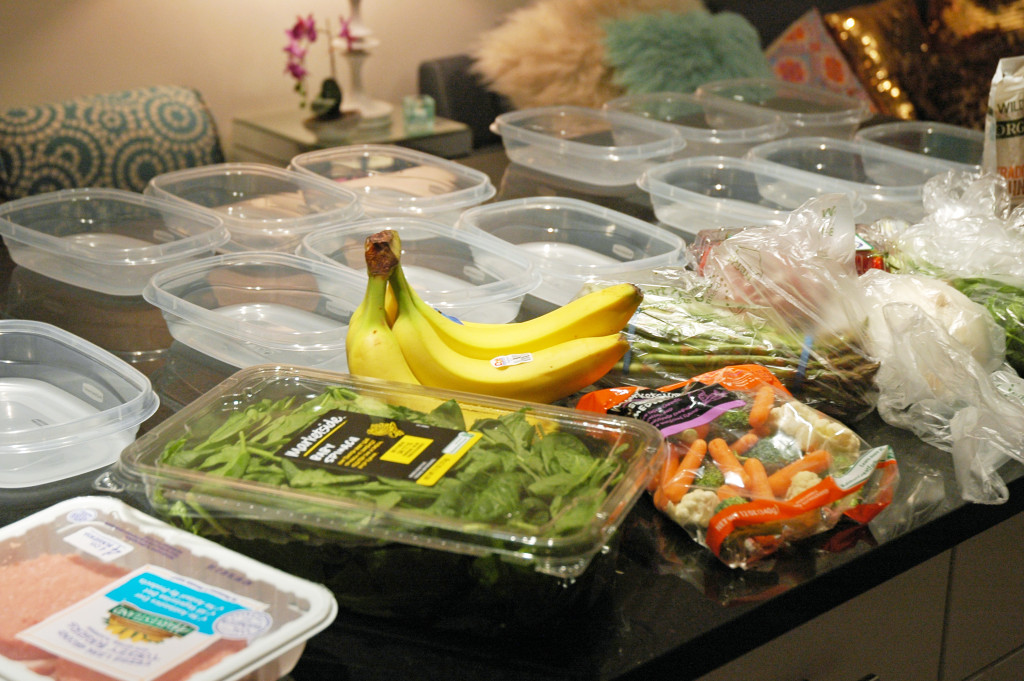
Advance meal preparation

Meal preparation involves preparing meals ahead of time. This practice may occur among people who desire to lose weight, gain muscle mass, or maintain a healthy lifestyle. Advance preparation can serve to standardize food portions. Prepared meals are fully cooked. Meals may be prepared in small containers such as Tupperware, and are sometimes labeled and dated to remain organized.

== Benefits ==
=== Saving money ===
By preparing meals in advance, there is a limited need for an individual to purchase food from restaurants or bars, which can have an average markup rate of around 300%. According to the 2020 Consumer Expenditures Report from the Bureau of Labor Statistics, there was a 32.6 percent decrease in spending on food away from home from 2019 to 2020 and, simultaneously, there was a 6.4 percent increase in spending on food at home (which is defined as food at grocery stores and other food stores where the final purchaser is the consumer.) These trends can be attributed to the implementation of the COVID-19 lockdown orders by governments during this period. The average consumer saved approximately $1151 from eating out less from 2019 to 2020.

=== Healthy eating ===
By using fresh, healthy ingredients as opposed to eating out or consuming a higher volume of processed foods, meal preparation provides numerous health benefits over eating outside of the home frequently. For example, multiple studies have shown that those who consume meals that were prepared at home more often had a significantly lower risk of acquiring type 2 diabetes mellitus. On the contrary, those who meal prep less and eat out more and consume more processed foods have seen to have a significantly higher risk of getting conditions such as hypertension, dyslipidemia, or cancer. Studies have also shown that individuals who eat more meals out, consume a significantly higher amount of sugar and fat and a significantly lower amount of important micronutrients such as iron, calcium and vitamin C.

== Drawbacks ==
If not stored properly, or not timely consumed, pre-cooked meals can become breeding grounds for bacteria. Potential mental health risks stem from being over-prepared, controlled and structured, with meal prepping creating a degree of rigidity that could conceivably become a fixation or rut. Additionally, degradation of plastic storage containers, especially when used for microwave heating or long-term storage, can release microplastics and nanoplastics into food. Containers, even those labeled "microwave-safe", (Note: "Microwave-safe" is more about structural integrity than chemical safety.) can degrade under heat, plastic lids on glass containers can degrade over time, and freezing containers can increase brittleness.

== See also ==
- List of cooking techniques
- Meal delivery service
- Microwave oven
- Multicooker
- Outline of food preparation
- Quarantine mealprep
