= Hog fry =

Oklahoma Cherokee social meal

A hog fry (Cherokee: ᏏᏆ ᎠᏂᎩᏍᎬᎢ (ᎠᏅᏣᏢᏍᎬ), romanized: siqua anigisgvi (anvtsatlvsgv)) is a traditional Oklahoma Cherokee social meal in which large iron kettles are placed over open fires. The kettles are then filled with oil or lard. Pieces of pork are then thrown in the hot oil and fried until cooked.

Hog fries are held regularly by tribal, cultural and church groups as well as by individual families.

The social aspect of cooking a whole hog at a hog fry is similar to the whole hog barbecue tradition of the Carolinas (but with a different method of cooking).

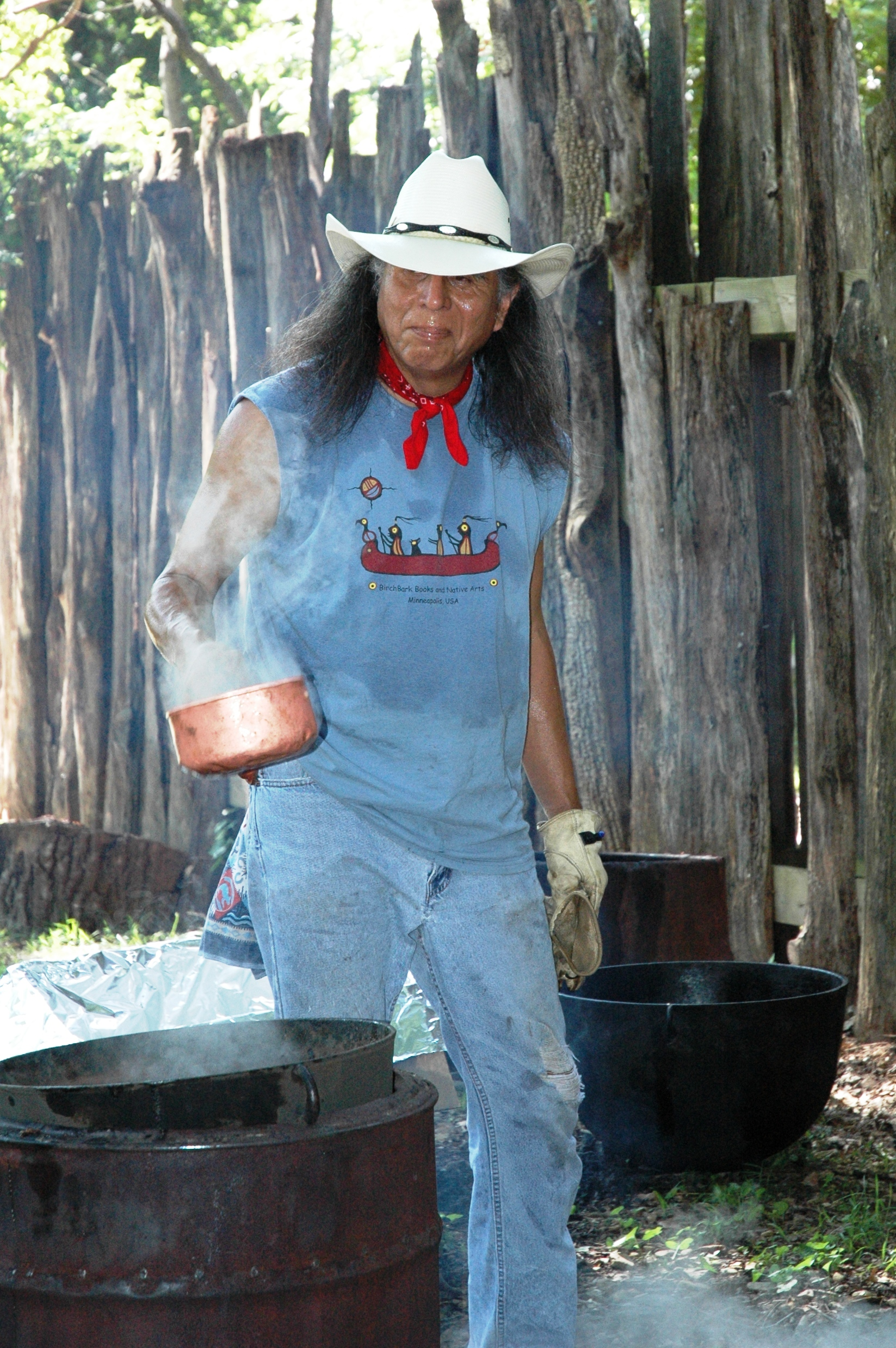
Cherokee man cooking at a hog fry

== See also ==
- Barbecue in Oklahoma
- Native American cuisine
