= Food away from home =

Service

Food-Away-From-Home (FAFH) covers meals and snacks supplied by commercial food service establishments and by eating facilities in non commercial institutions.

== Segments covered in FAFH ==
According to the USDA, food-away-from-home accounted for over 50% of total U.S. food expenditures in 2022, reflecting a long-term trend where spending at restaurants and other foodservice establishments has surpassed spending on food at home.

Commercial Foodservice

- Limited service restaurants: quick service restaurants, quick casual dining, cafeteria, delivery and take-away, and buffet
- Full-service restaurants: family style restaurants, casual dining, upscale casual dining and fine dining restaurants
- Drinking place: bars & taverns
- Lodging: hotels, motels, bed & breakfasts, etc.
- Retail stores (including vending machine sales),
- Recreational places (i.e. movie theaters, bowling alleys, pool parlors, sports arenas, amusement parks, camps, golf and country clubs).

Non-commercial foodservice

- Schools and colleges
- Healthcare facilities, including hospitals and nursing homes
- Business and industry foodservice, such as employee cafeterias in offices, factories, and plants
- Other institutions, including military bases, airlines, child care centers, and civic or social organizations

== See also ==
- Foodservice distributor
