= Social marker =

Clue to an individual's group identity

A social marker is a discernible sign that gives a clue to a group identity of the person with the marker. It is frequently used by members of elite to indicate their dominant position through appearance, speech, dress, choice of food, and rituals of socializing, so called class markers.

The markers delimit the boundaries between the social groups, connecting a person to "in-group" people like them and at the same time separating from the "out-group" ones (unlike others).

== Language and speech ==
In sociolinguistics, a social marker is a cue to the social position of the speaker provided through both linguistic (choice of language or languages, language style, accent, dialect, code-switching) and paralinguistic (voice pitch and tone) means. These clues might indicate the context of the speech, the well-known ones define the social group of the speaker: age, sex and gender, social class, ethnicity. For example, an average Briton would have no problem identifying an American or Australian, and, quite likely, a native of Exeter or Liverpool through their patterns of speech.

High social status is typically associated with the prestige of the standard language variety (for example, of the received pronunciation in Britain). The social markers associated with the speech, along with other forms of social capital, are among the hardest to acquire while moving up the social ladder. Using non-standard variety of language sometimes carries societal benefits as well, this phenomenon is called the "covert prestige".

== Dress ==
Dress is probably the most easily observable social marker, in the 21st century it manifests itself as "really expensive" brand names.

Timothy Reuter points to the crucial importance of the dress as a marker in the Middle Ages: aristocrats "were willing to risk [...] immortal souls for the sake of a sable coat" (Adam of Bremen, 11th century) while limiting the availability of expensive materials (furs, bright-colored fabric) to the rest of the population (cf. the sumptuary laws spreading in the 12th century).

== Appearance ==
In the medieval Europe nobles were easy to recognize by their appearance alone: they ate more (and better) food and were physically larger (the modern humans are much taller than medieval commoners, but about the same height as the nobles of the same times), and the sick members of nobility were mostly hidden from view (for example, in monasteries), giving an appearance of lack of physical and mental problems among them.

Teeth and (later) access to dentistry have been used as a social marker since the Neolithic age.

== Food ==
The food represents a demarcation line for the elites (caviar, champagne, goat cheese), this class marker was commented upon since the Classical Antiquity (cf. works by Mozi for the ancient Chinese perspective). Upwardly mobile group imitates the elites, so in the past the sumptuary laws were used to restrict the elite food (like porpoises or sturgeons in the medieval England) consumption by the masses.

== Use of tobacco ==
Use of tobacco and similar substances have been employed as social marker many times to delimit various groups:

- in the 1990s, smoking among adolescents was a social marker of "being cool";
- tobacco sniffing originally was an elite ritual that, unlike many other forms of ingestion, allowed for social interaction between the two sexes. By the beginning of the 19th century, however, it lost popularity and gradually got associated with the rural population and lower classes;
- cigars displaced the snuff as a sign of (relatively) higher classes (the poor continued the use of smoking pipe) and manliness (females were excluded), the use of cigars was emulated by the less-wealthy groups;
- tobacco chewing briefly became a class marker of rural landowners during the Jacksonian democracy of the 1830s. The decidedly impolite action of public chewing and spitting carried prestige as a sign of assertive rural man that "was as good ... as any so-called gentleman".

== See also ==
- Paideia
- Status symbol, an ostentatious display of social status
- U and non-U English

== Sources ==
- Anderson, E. N. (2020-12-31). "Me, Myself, and the Others: Food as Social Marker". Everyone Eats. New York University Press. pp. 171–187. doi:10.18574/nyu/9780814785768.003.0014.
- Avruch, Kevin (2019-11-21). "Culture and Conflict Resolution". The Palgrave Encyclopedia of Peace and Conflict Studies. Cham: Springer International Publishing. doi:10.1007/978-3-030-11795-5_67-1. ISBN 978-3-030-11795-5.
- Collins, R. (2014). "Tobacco Ritual and Anti-Ritual: Substance Ingestion as a History of Social Boundaries". Interaction Ritual Chains. Princeton Studies in Cultural Sociology. Princeton University Press. ISBN 978-1-4008-5174-4.
- Danesi, Marcel (1993). "Smoking behavior in adolescence as signifying osmosis". Semiotica. 96 (1–2). Walter de Gruyter GmbH. doi:10.1515/semi.1993.96.1-2.53. ISSN 0037-1998.
- Kvaavik, Elisabeth; von Soest, Tilmann; Pedersen, Willy (2014-02-05). "Nondaily smoking: a population-based, longitudinal study of stability and predictors". BMC Public Health. 14 (1). Springer Science and Business Media LLC. doi:10.1186/1471-2458-14-123. ISSN 1471-2458. PMC 3923098.
- Norcliffe, Glen (2011). "Neoliberal mobility and its discontents: Working tricycles in China's cities". City, Culture and Society. 2 (4). Elsevier BV: 235–242. doi:10.1016/j.ccs.2011.11.006. ISSN 1877-9166.
- Pitts, Margaret Jane; Gallois, Cindy (2019-05-23), "Social Markers in Language and Speech", Oxford Research Encyclopedia of Psychology, Oxford University Press, doi:10.1093/acrefore/9780190236557.013.300, ISBN 978-0-19-023655-7
- Reuter, Timothy (2002-12-31). "Nobles and Others: The Social and Cultural Expression of Power Relations in the Middle Ages". Nobles and Nobility in Medieval Europe. Boydell and Brewer. doi:10.1515/9781846150111-011. ISBN 978-1-84615-011-1.
- Vaughan, Graham M.; Hogg, Michael A. (2013). Social Psychology. Always learning. Pearson Higher Education AU. ISBN 978-1-4425-6231-8.
- Zakrzewski, Sonia (2012). "Dental Morphology, Dental Health and its Social Implications". Prehistory of Northeastern Africa: New Ideas and Discoveries. Studies in African Archaeology. Vol. 11. Poznań Archaeological Museum. pp. 125–140.
