= Dinner =

Largest and most formal meal of the day

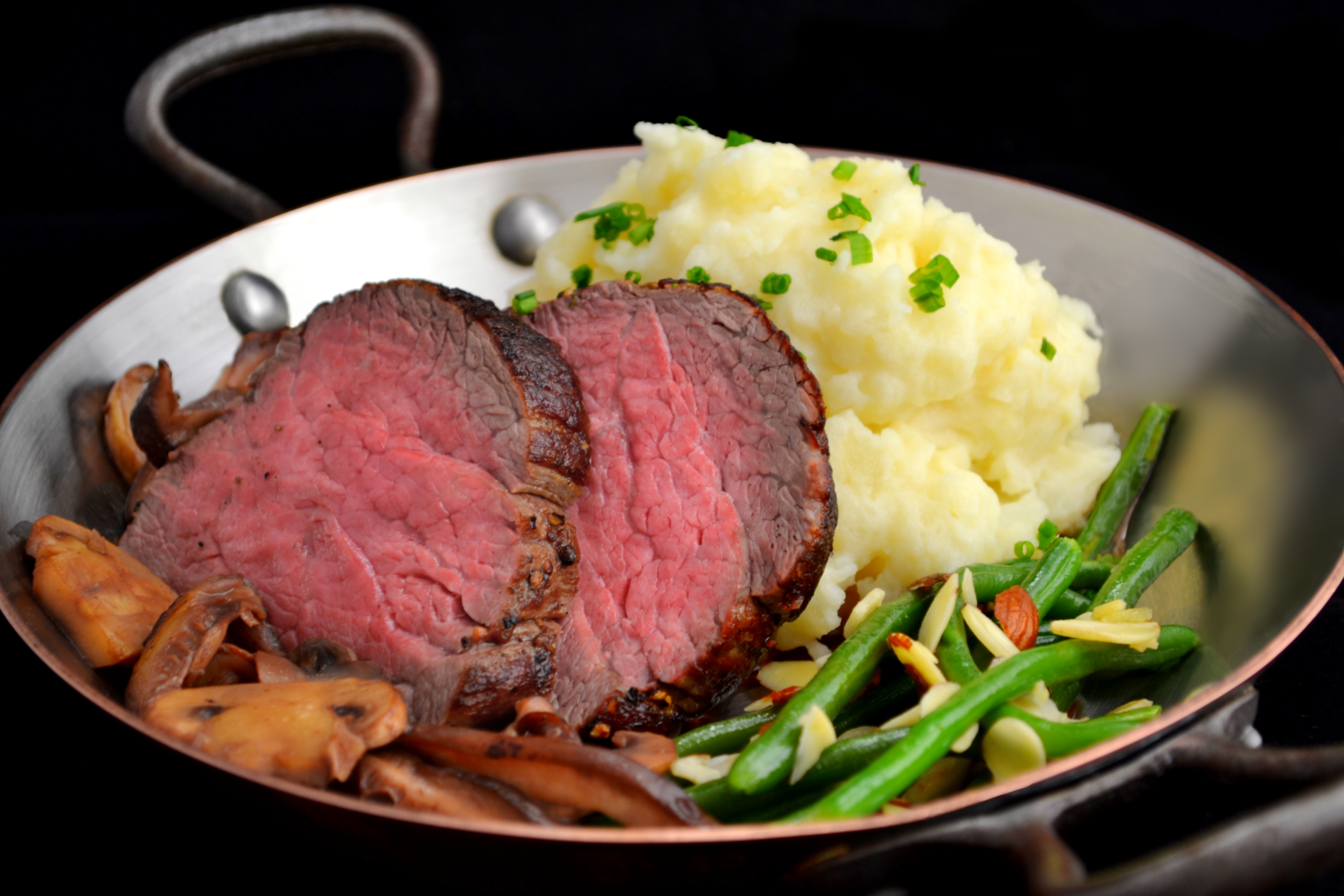
A filet mignon dinner with mashed potato, string beans and mushrooms

Dinner usually refers to what is in many Western cultures the biggest and most formal meal of the day. Historically, the largest meal used to be eaten around midday, and was called dinner. Especially among the elite, it gradually migrated to later in the day over the 16th to 19th centuries. The word has different meanings depending on culture, and may mean a meal of any size eaten at any time of day. In particular, it is still sometimes used for a meal at noon or in the early afternoon on special occasions, such as a Christmas dinner.

== Etymology ==
The word is from the Old French (c. 1300) disner, meaning "dine", from the stem of Gallo-Romance desjunare ("to break one's fast"), from Latin dis- (which indicates the opposite of an action) + Late Latin ieiunare ("to fast"), from Latin ieiunus ("fasting, hungry"). The Romanian word dejun and the French déjeuner retain this etymology and to some extent the meaning (whereas the Spanish word desayuno and Portuguese desjejum are related but are exclusively used for breakfast). Eventually, the term shifted to referring to the heavy main meal of the day, even if it had been preceded by a breakfast meal (or even both breakfast and lunch).

== Time of day ==
=== Pre-modern ===
Reflecting the typical custom of the 17th century, Louis XIV dined at noon, and had supper at 10:00 pm. But in Europe, dinner began to move later in the day during the 1700s, due to developments in work practices, lighting, financial status, and cultural changes. The fashionable hour for dinner continued to be incrementally postponed during the 18th century, to two and three in the afternoon, and, in 1765, King George III dined at 4:00 pm, though his infant sons had theirs with their governess at 2:00 pm, leaving time to visit the queen as she dressed for dinner with the king. But in France Marie Antoinette, when still Dauphine of France in 1770, wrote that when at the Château de Choisy the court still dined at 2:00 pm, with a supper after the theatre at around 10:00 pm, before bed at 1:00 or 1:30 am.

At the time of the First French Empire an English traveler to Paris remarked upon the "abominable habit of dining as late as seven in the evening". By about 1850 English middle-class dinners were around 5:00 or 6:00 pm, allowing men to arrive back from work, but there was a continuing pressure for the hour to drift later, led by the elite who did not have to work set hours, and as commutes got longer as cities expanded. In the mid-19th century the issue was something of a social minefield, with a generational element. John Ruskin, once he married in 1848, dined at 6:00 pm, which his parents thought "unhealthy". Mrs Gaskell dined between 4:00 and 5:00 pm. The fictional Mr Pooter, a lower middle-class Londoner in 1888–89 and a diner at 5:00 pm, was invited by his son to dine at 8:00 pm, but "[he] said we did not pretend to be fashionable people, and would like the dinner earlier".

The satirical novel Living for Appearances (1855) by Henry Mayhew and his brother Augustus begins with the views of the hero on the matter. He dines at 7:00 pm, and often complains of "the disgusting and tradesman-like custom of early dining", say at 2:00 pm. The "Royal hour" he regards as 8:00 pm, but he does not aspire to that. He tells people "Tell me when you dine, and I will tell you what you are", in apparent reference to Jean Anthelme Brillat-Savarin's famous, "Tell me what you eat, and I will tell you what you are."

=== Modern ===
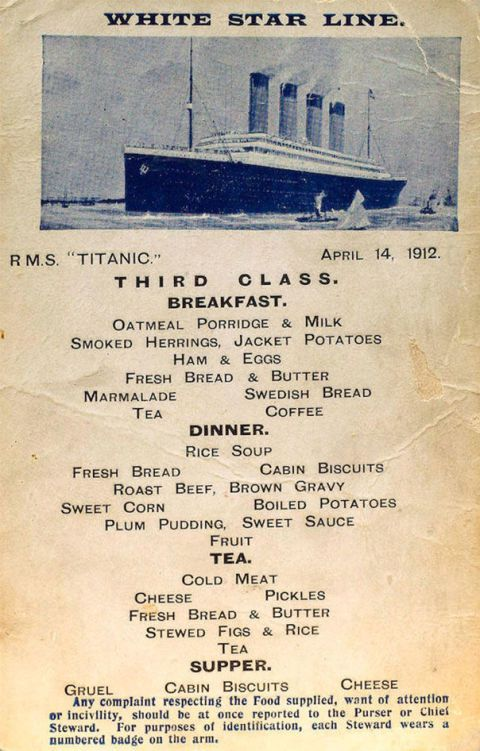
The image depicts the third class menu of the RMS Titanic on the day of her sinking, showing "dinner" as the midday meal, distinct from the lighter evening meal of "supper".

In many modern usages, the term dinner refers to the evening meal, which is now typically the largest meal of the day in most Western cultures. When this meaning is used, the preceding meals are usually referred to as breakfast, lunch and perhaps a tea. Supper is now often an alternative term for dinner; originally this was always a later secondary evening meal, after an early dinner.

The divide between different meanings of "dinner" is not cut-and-dried based on either geography or socioeconomic class. The term for the midday meal is most commonly used by working-class people, especially in the English Midlands, North of England and the central belt of Scotland. Even in systems in which dinner is the meal usually eaten at the end of the day, an individual dinner may still refer to a main or more sophisticated meal at any time in the day, such as a banquet, feast, or a special meal eaten on a Sunday or holiday, such as Christmas dinner or Thanksgiving dinner. At such a dinner, the people who dine together may be formally dressed and consume food with an array of utensils. These dinners are often divided into three or more courses. Appetizers consisting of options such as soup or salad, precede the main course, which is followed by the dessert.

==== Dinner times ====
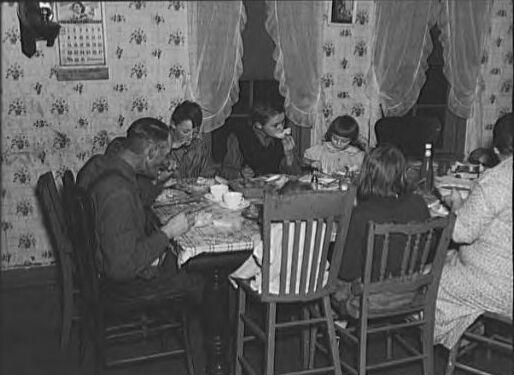
A family at dinner (March 1937)

===== United Kingdom =====
A 2007 survey by Jacob's Creek, an Australian winemaker, found the average evening meal time in the UK to be 7:47 pm.

===== United States =====
Dinner time in the United States peaks at 6:19 p.m., according to an American Time Use Survey analysis, with most households eating dinner between 5:07 p.m. and 8:19 p.m. According to the data from 2018 to 2022, the states that ate the earliest were Pennsylvania (5:37 p.m. peak) and Maine (5:40 p.m. peak), while the states that ate the latest were Texas and Mississippi (both a 7:02 p.m. peak) and Washington, D.C., which ate at 7:10 p.m. peak.

== Parties ==
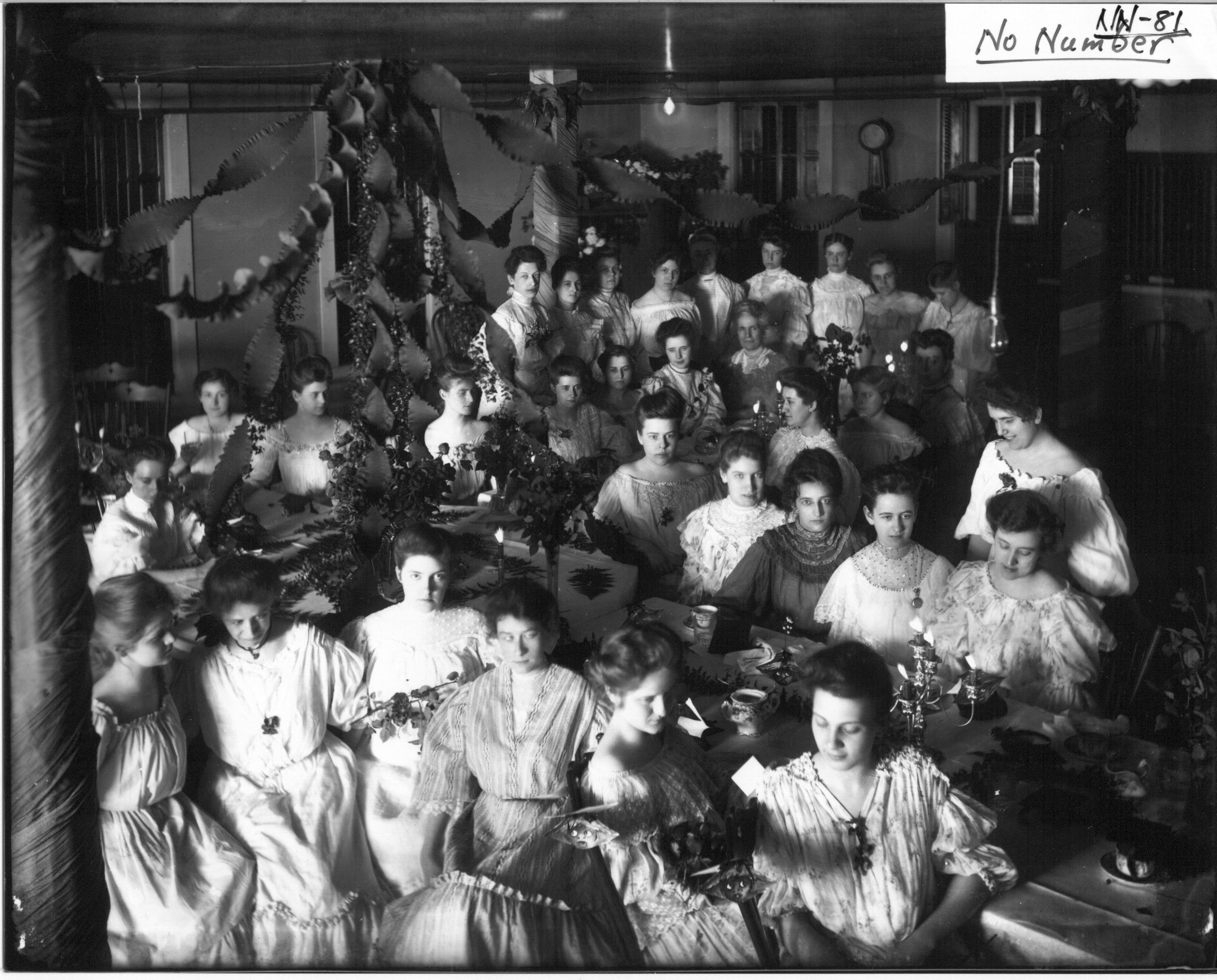
Women in formal dress at dinner at Oxford Female Institute, Ohio, United States, date unknown

A dinner party is a social gathering at which people congregate to eat dinner. Dinners exist on a spectrum, from a basic meal to a state dinner.

=== Ancient Roman ===
During the times of Ancient Rome, a dinner party was referred to as a convivium, and was a significant event for Roman emperors and senators to congregate and discuss their relations.

=== English ===
In London (c. 1875–c. 1900), dinner parties were formal occasions that included printed invitations and formal RSVPs. The food served at these parties ranged from large, extravagant food displays and several meal courses to more simple fare and food service. Activities sometimes included singing and poetry reciting, among others.

=== Formal ===
The general guidelines of a formal dinner include the following:

1. It requires that the participants dress in semi-formal (black-tie) or formal (white-tie) evening attire.
  - Most commonly, guests will be expected to dress in semi-formal, black-tie attire. The men wear tuxedos and women wear cocktail dresses, evening gowns or le smoking (the women's tuxedo).
  - The most formal of dinner events will require guests to dress in formal, white-tie attire. The men wear a full evening-dress ensemble (white-tie and tailcoat), and women wear evening gowns or ball gowns.
2. A commitment to a style of formal dinner service.
  - Service rendered in the Russian style, or service à la russe. A manner of dining where each course is brought to the table sequentially, and the food portioned on individual plates by the waiter. The Russian style of service is usually perceived to be a more formal method.
  - Service rendered in the French style, or service à la française. Traditionally, it can be defined as a manner of service that is rendered via serving various dishes of the meal, all at the same time in an impressive display, and the guests serve themselves from the serving dishes – similar to that of a buffet. However, French style service can be rendered in a variety of methods.
    - Guéridon service, also known as "tableside service" or "from the cart," is a relative blend of the French and Russian styles, where every dish is portioned by a waiter at the tableside. It involves the cooking or finishing of foods by a waiter, maître d'hôtel or captain at the diner's table typically from a special serving cart called a guéridon trolley. Gueridon service offers a higher style of service to the guest.
    - Other styles include banquet, buffet, and assisted buffet.
  - Service rendered in the English style, or service à l'anglaise, is usually viewed as a slightly trimmed down version of Russian style service, but has a strong emphasis on the professionalism of the servicing personnel. The English style of service is also known as "butler service."
3. An appropriately formal setting or dining room.
4. There are multiple courses served.
5. There is a seating protocol.

== Gallery ==
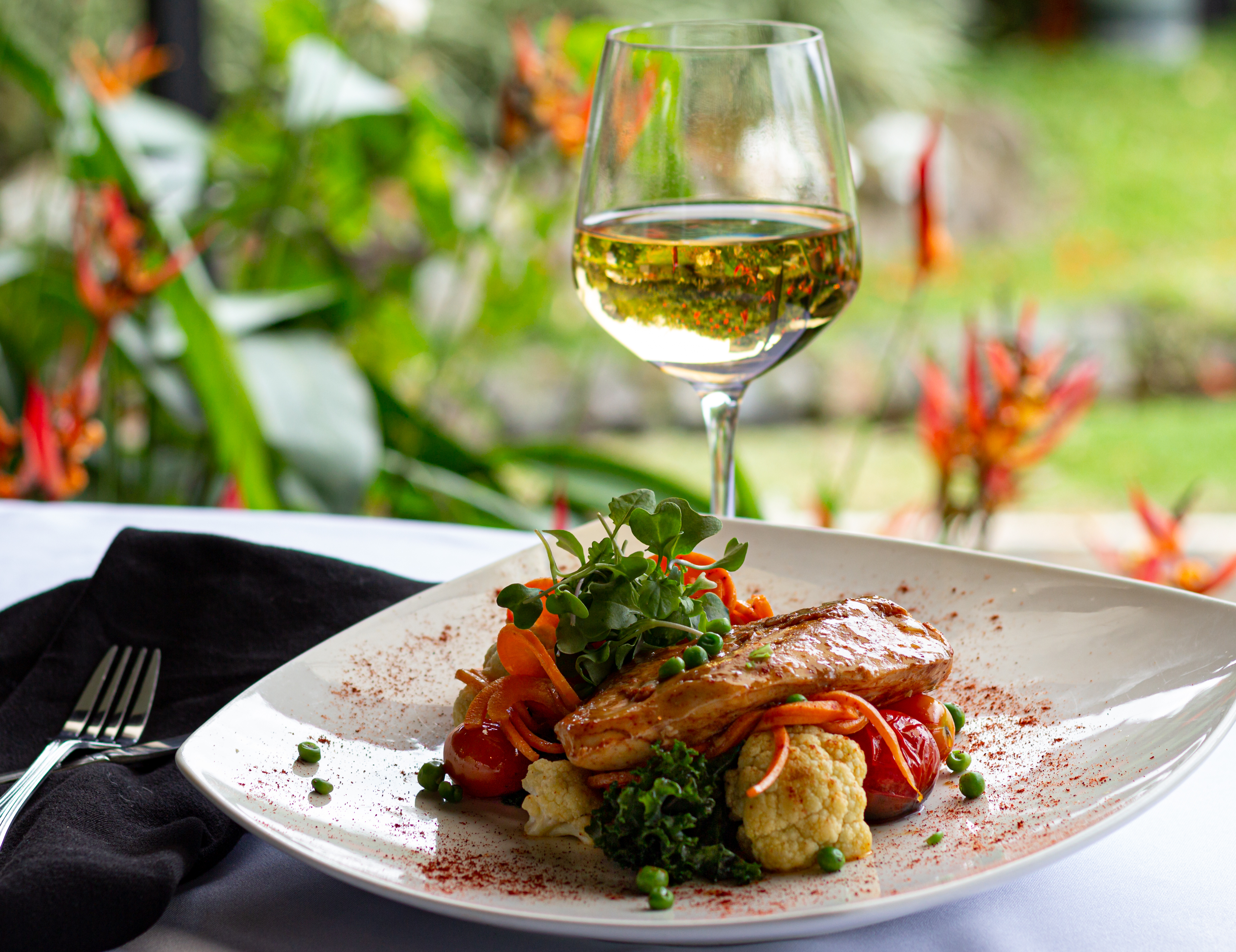
Casual dinner in western restaurant

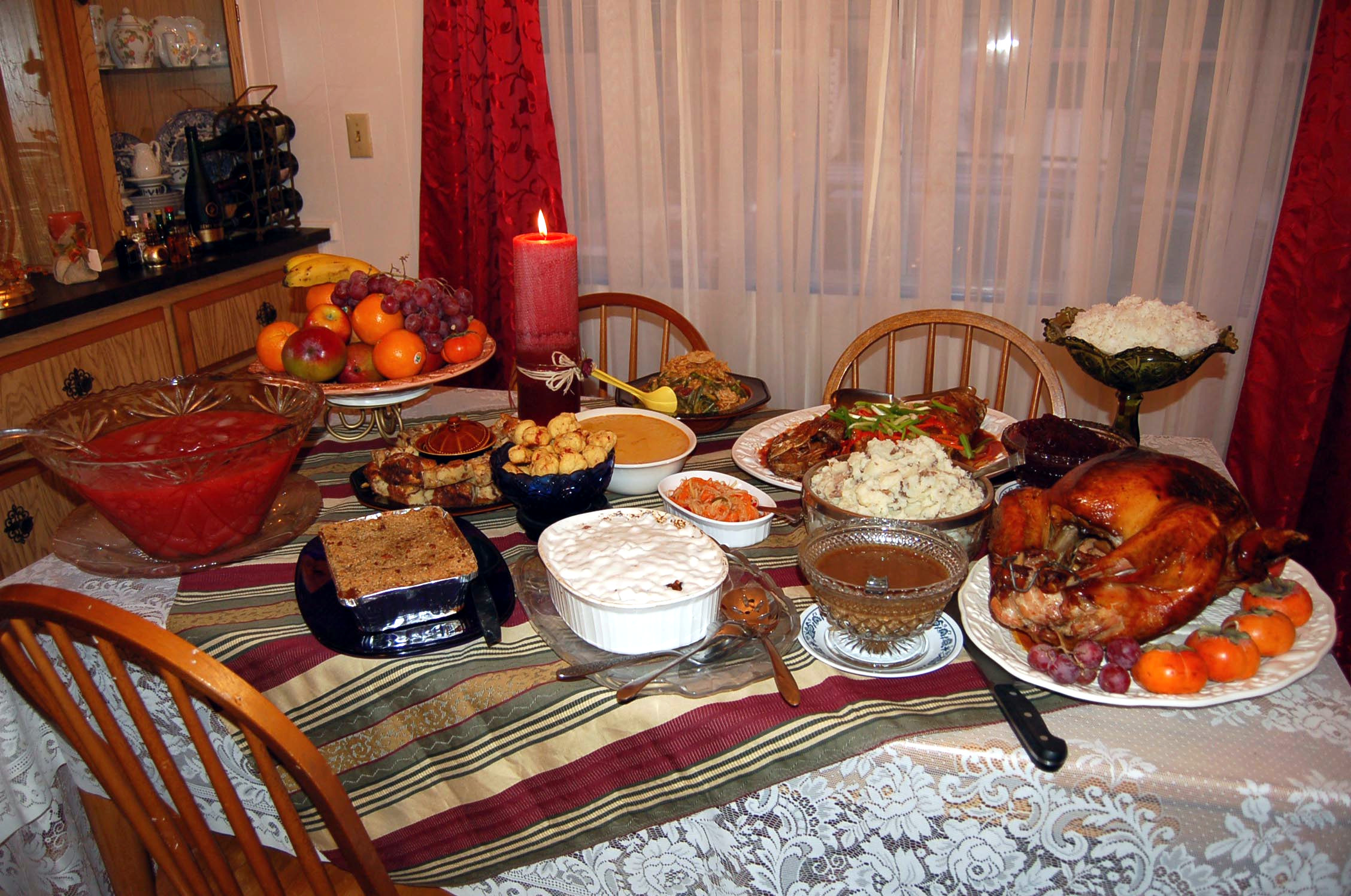
Thanksgiving dinner

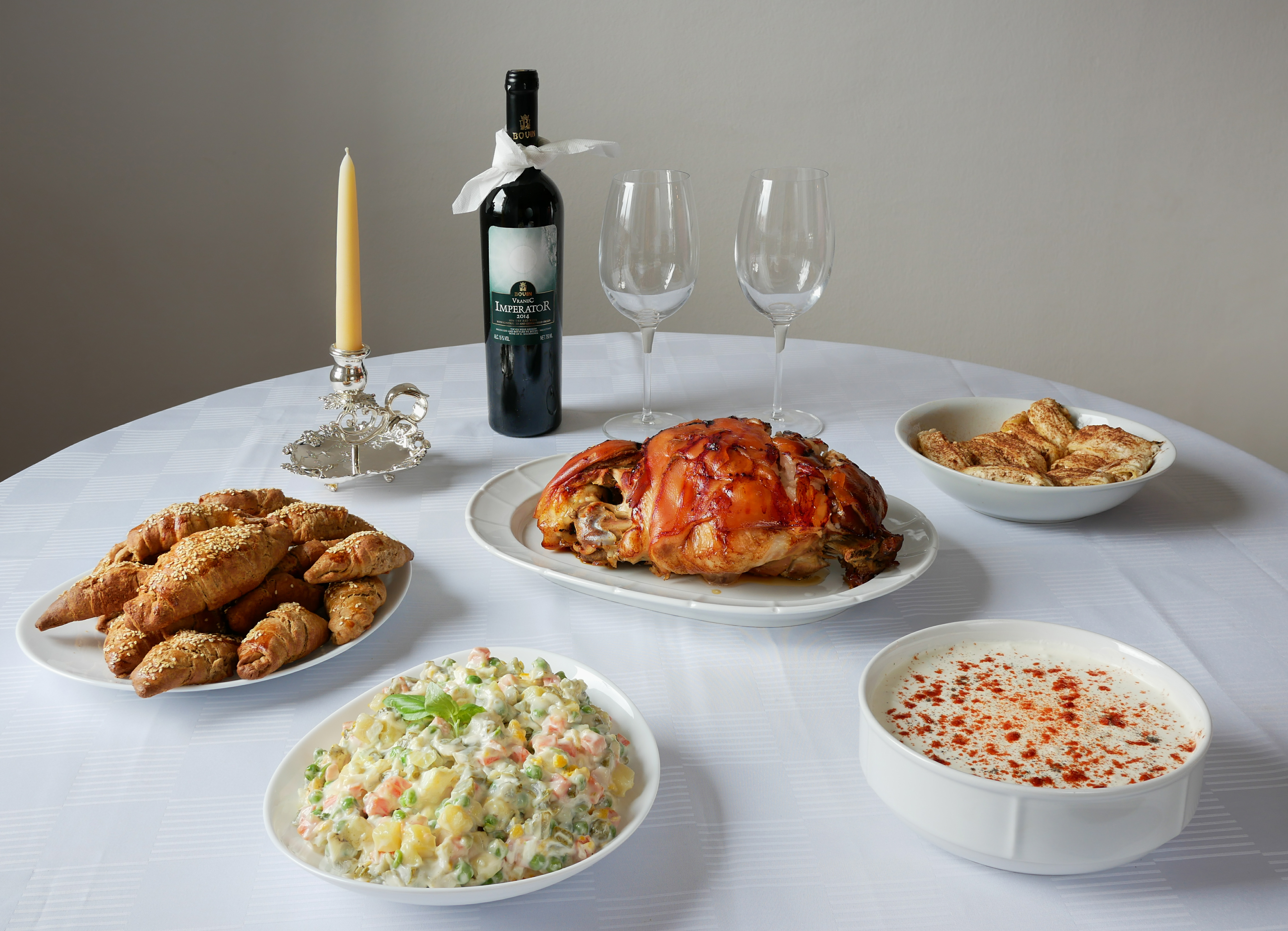
Christmas dinner

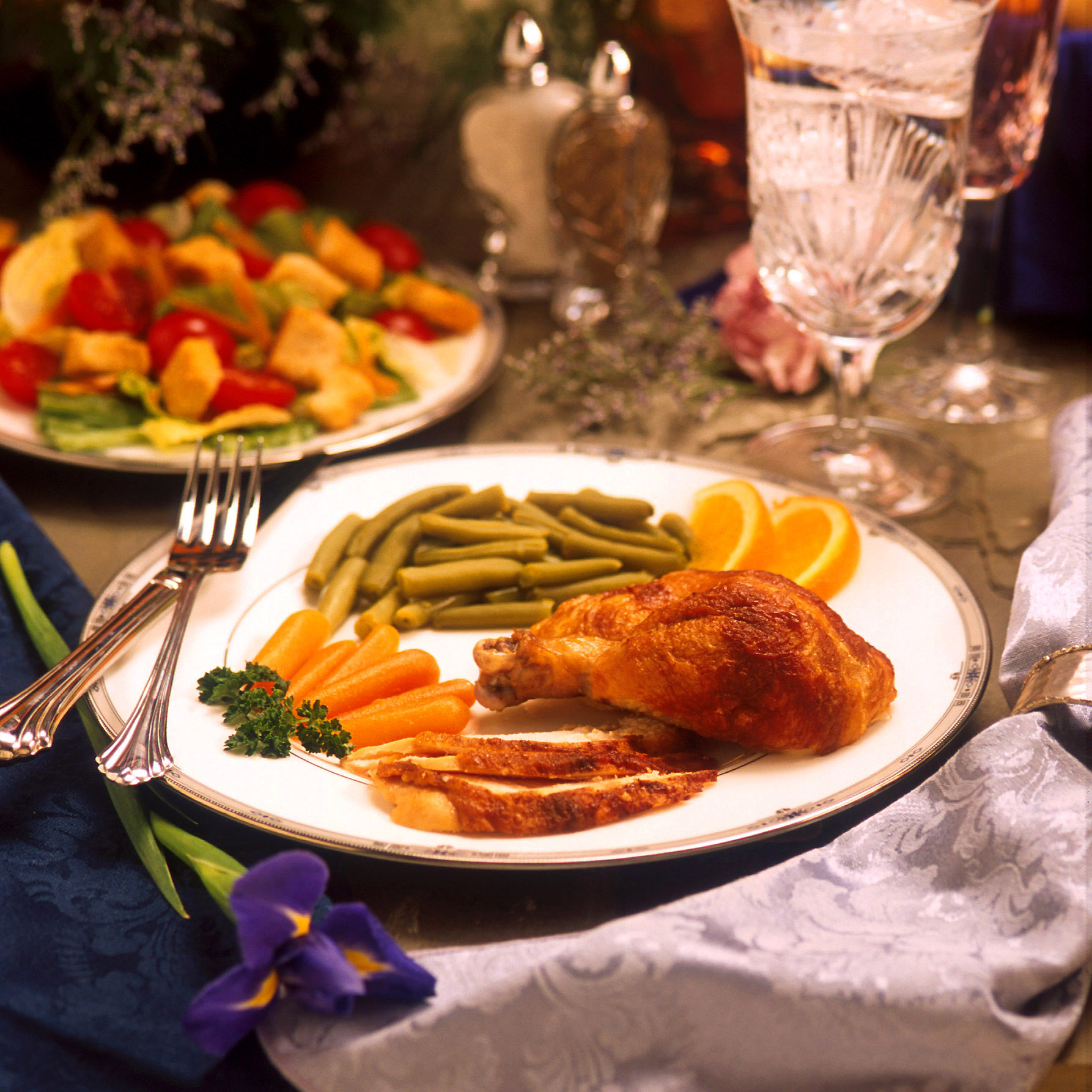
A formal American dinner setting

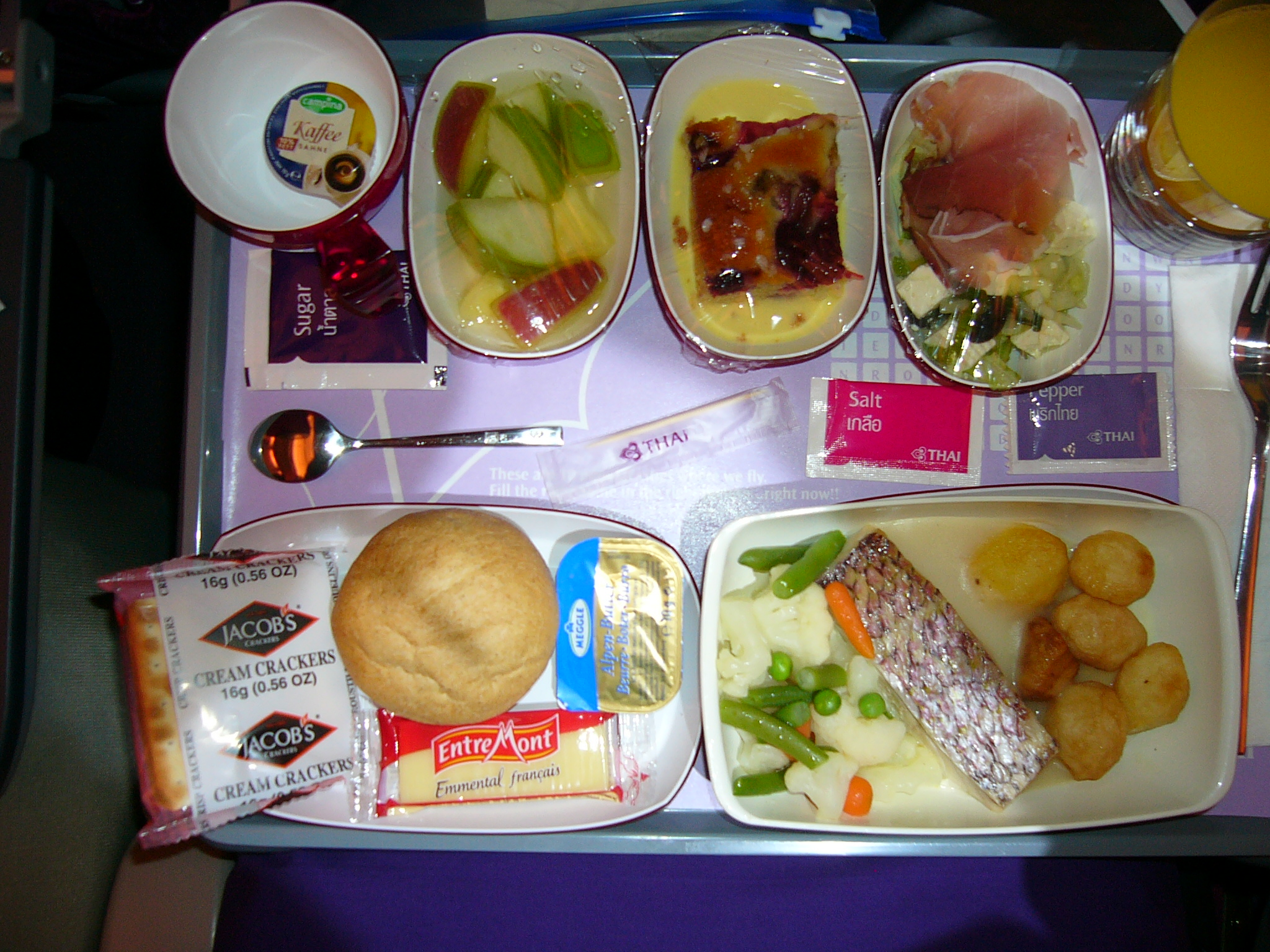
An airline dinner meal

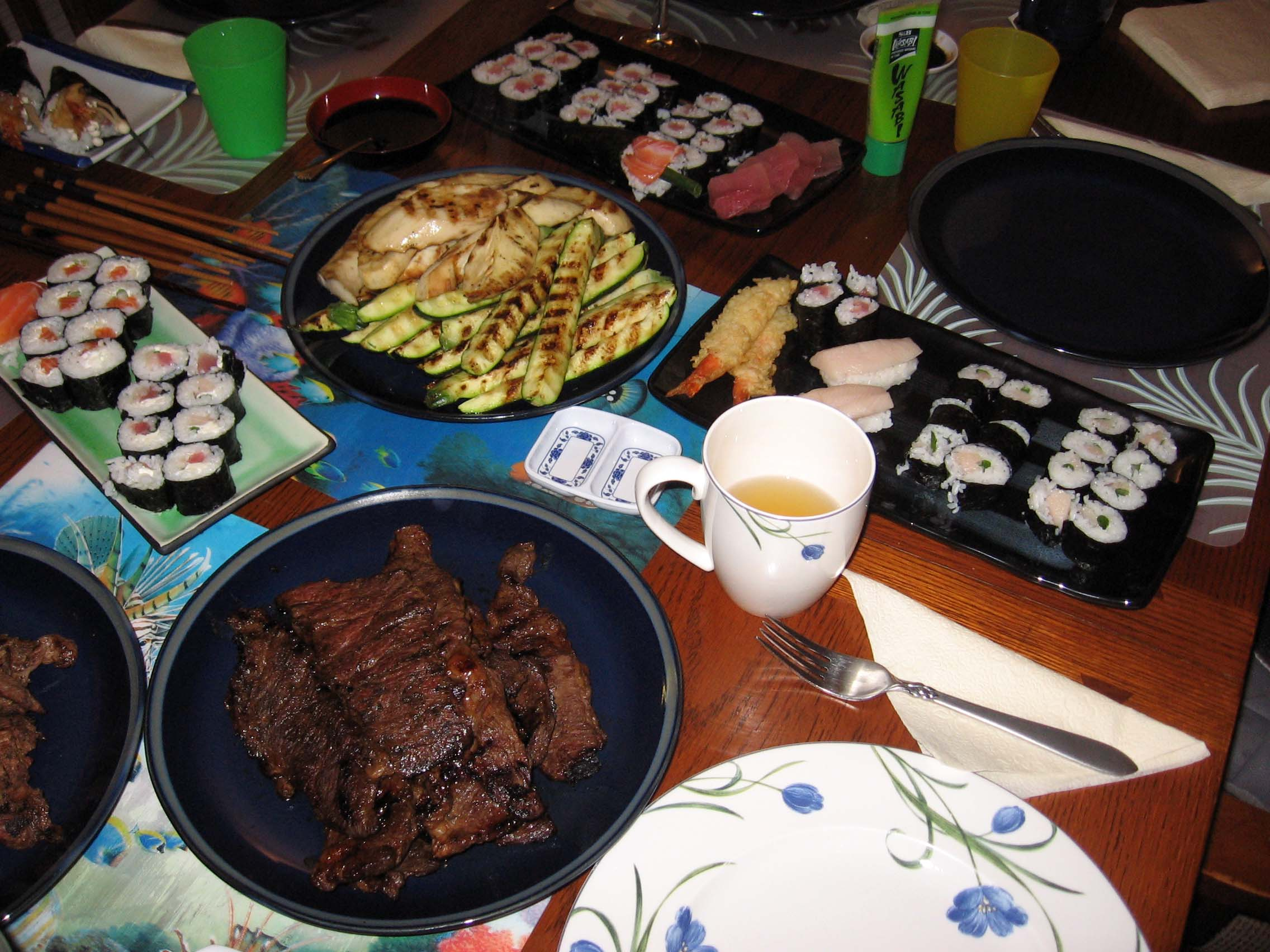
Japanese dinner

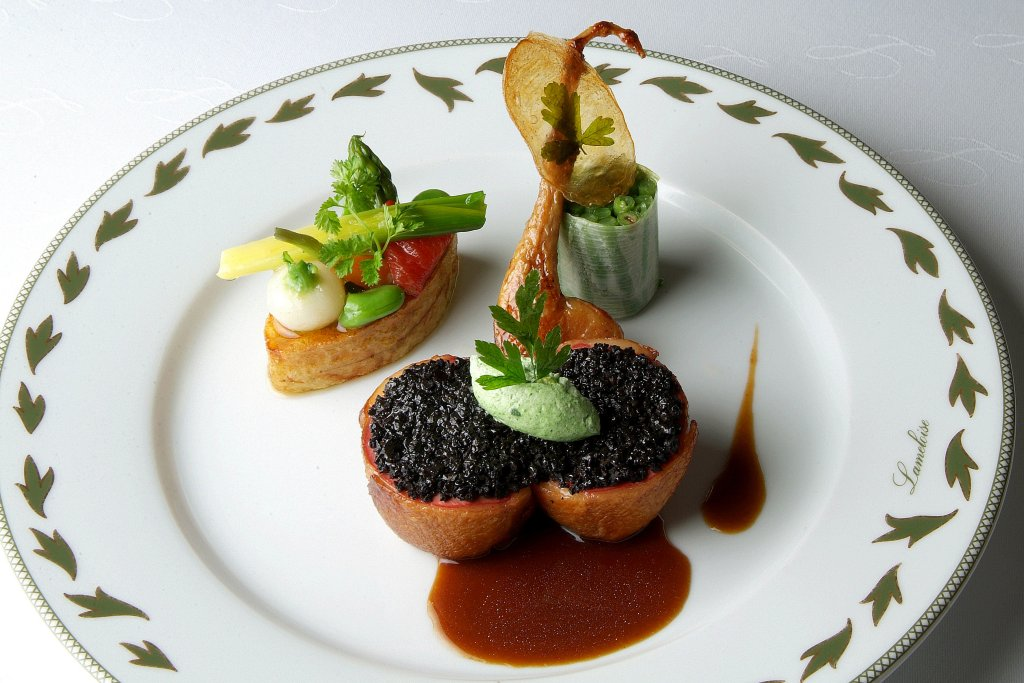
Dinner nouvelle cuisine

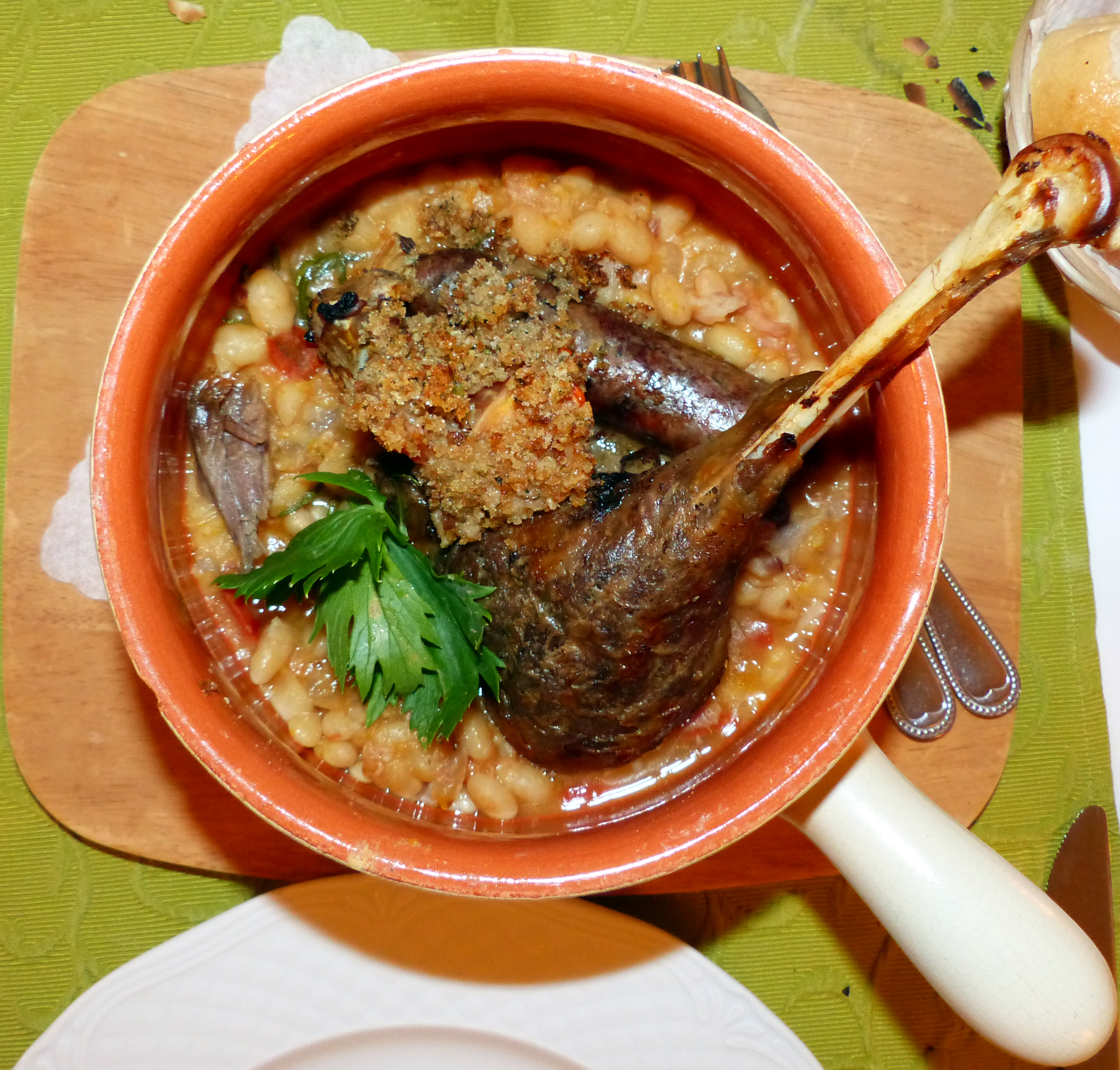
Cassoulet for German dinner

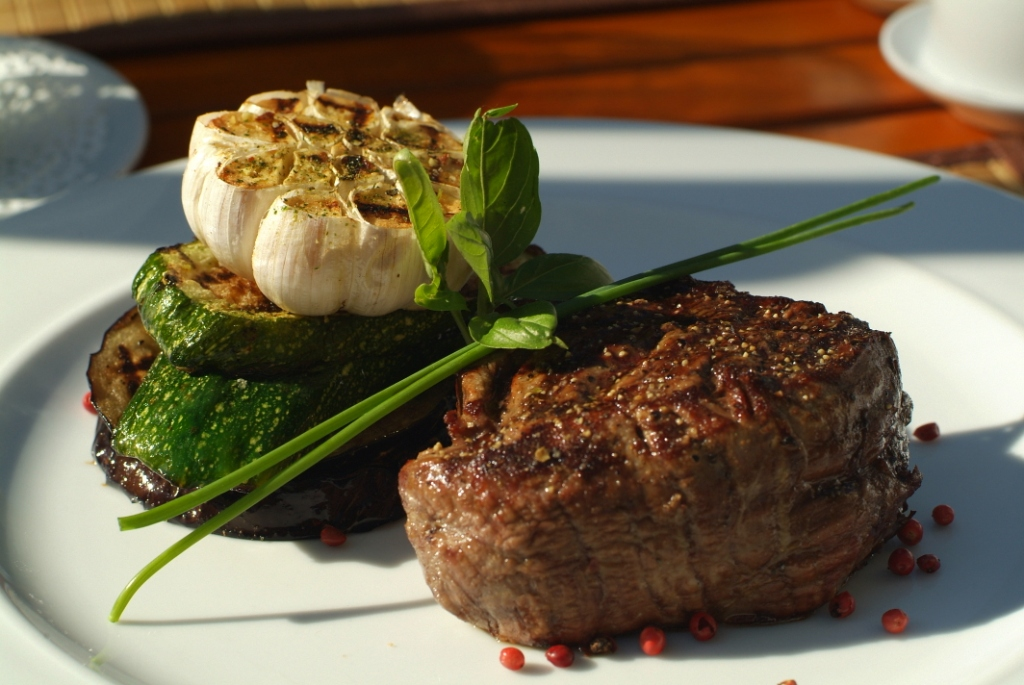
Beef steak at a steakhouse

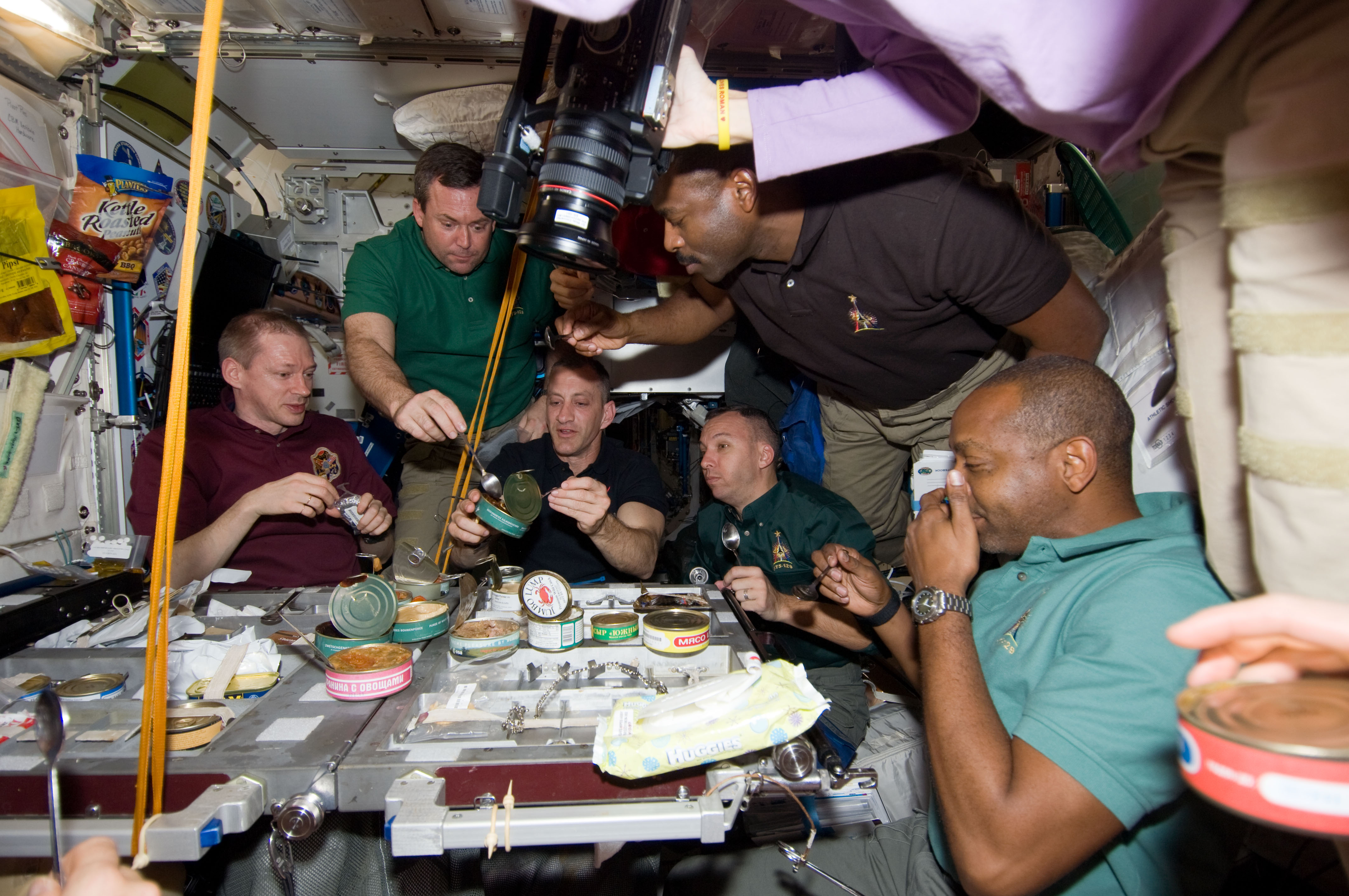
A dinner in space aboard the ISS during STS-129

== See also ==
- Early bird dinner
- Formal hall
- Snack
- Supper
- Tea

== Bibliography ==
- Draznin, Y. (2001). Victorian London's Middle-class Housewife: What She Did All Day. ABC-Clio ebook. Greenwood Press. ISBN 978-0-313-31399-8.
- Edwards, C. (2007). Death in Ancient Rome. Yale University Press. ISBN 978-0-300-11208-5.
- Flanders, Judith, The Victorian House: Domestic Life from Childbirth to Deathbed, 2003, Harper Perennial, ISBN 0007131895
- McMillan, Sherrie (2001). "What time is dinner?". History Magazine. Archived from the original on 8 December 2017.
- Strong, Roy, Feast: A History of Grand Eating, 2002, Jonathan Cape, ISBN 0224061380
