= Meal =

Eating that takes place at a specific time

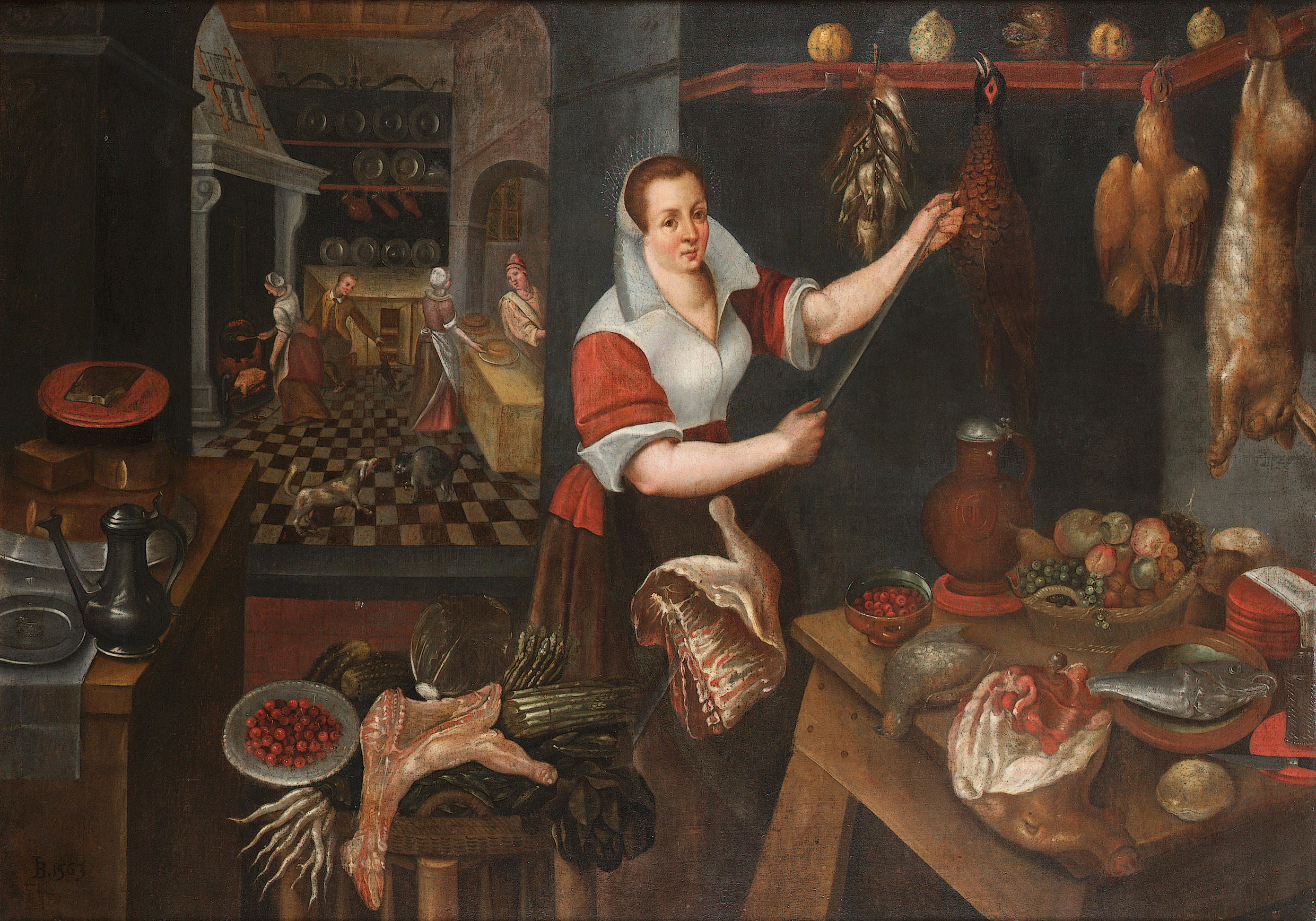
Traditionally, meals have been prepared by women in a home kitchen (painting from the circle of Jean-Baptiste de Saive, 1563).

A meal is an occasion that occurs at a specific time and involves the consumption of food. The English names used for specific meals vary, depending on the speaker's culture, the time of day, or the size of the meal. A meal is different from a snack in that meals are generally larger, more varied, and more filling.

Though they can be eaten anywhere, meals usually take place in homes, restaurants, and cafeterias. Regular meals occur on a daily basis, typically several times a day. Special meals are normally held in conjunction with celebratory or momentous occasions such as birthdays, weddings, anniversaries, funerals, and holidays.

The type of food that is served or consumed at any given time depends on regional customs. Three main meals are typically eaten in the morning, early afternoon, and evening in most civilizations. Furthermore, the names of meals are often interchangeable by custom as well. Some serve dinner as the main meal at midday, with supper as the late afternoon/early evening meal, while others may call their midday meal lunch and their early evening meal supper or dinner. Except for breakfast, these names can vary from region to region or even from family to family.

== Breakfast ==
Breakfast is the first meal of a day, most often eaten in the early morning before undertaking the day's work. Some believe it to be the most important meal of the day. The word breakfast literally refers to breaking the fasting period of the prior night.

Breakfast foods vary widely from place to place, but often include carbohydrates such as grains or cereals, fruit, vegetables, protein foods like eggs, meat or fish, and beverages such as tea, coffee, milk, or fruit juice. Coffee, milk, tea, juice, breakfast cereals, pancakes, waffles, sausages, French toast, bacon, sweetened breads, fresh fruits, vegetables, eggs, baked beans, muffins, crumpets and toast with butter, margarine, jam or marmalade are common examples of Western breakfast foods, though a large range of preparations and ingredients are associated with breakfast globally.

=== Variations of breakfast ===
==== Full breakfast ====
A full breakfast is a breakfast meal, usually including bacon, sausages, eggs, and a variety of other cooked foods, with hot beverages such as coffee or tea, or cold beverages such as juice or milk. It is especially popular in the UK and Ireland, to the extent that many cafés and pubs offer the meal at any time of day as an "all-day breakfast". It is also popular in other English-speaking countries.

In different parts of the United Kingdom like England, it is usually referred to as a 'full English breakfast' (often shortened to 'full English') or 'fry-up'. Other regional variants across the UK include the 'full Scottish' in Scotland, 'full Welsh' in Wales, and the 'Ulster fry' in Northern Ireland.

The full breakfast is among the most internationally recognised British dishes, along with such staples as bangers & mash, shepherd's pie, fish and chips and the Christmas dinner. The full breakfast became popular in the British Isles during the Victorian era, and appeared as one among many suggested breakfasts in the home economist Isabella Beeton's The Book of Household Management (1861). A full breakfast is often contrasted (e.g. on hotel menus) with the lighter alternative of a Continental breakfast, traditionally consisting of tea, milk or coffee and fruit juices with bread, croissants, or pastries.

==== Instant breakfast ====
"Instant breakfast" typically refers to breakfast food products that are manufactured in a powdered form, which are generally prepared with the addition of milk and then consumed as a beverage. Some instant breakfasts are produced and marketed in liquid form, being pre-mixed. The target market for instant breakfast products includes consumers who tend to be busy, such as working adults.

==== Champagne breakfast ====
A champagne breakfast is a breakfast served with champagne or sparkling wine. It is a new concept in some countries and is not typical of the role of a breakfast.

It may be part of any day or outing considered particularly luxurious or indulgent. The accompanying breakfast is sometimes of a similarly high standard and include rich foods such as salmon, caviar, chocolate or pastries, which would not ordinarily be eaten at breakfast or more courses. Instead of as a formal meal the breakfast can be given to the recipient in a basket or hamper.

Variations of breakfasts across countries and cuisines

Various cultures around the world eat a diverse range of foods for breakfast.

== Lunch ==
Lunch is a meal typically eaten at midday; it varies in size by culture and region. The word lunch is an abbreviation for luncheon, whose origin relates to a small snack originally eaten at any time of the day or night. During the 20th century, the meaning in English gradually narrowed to a small or mid-sized meal eaten at midday. Lunch is commonly the second meal of the day after breakfast. Significant variations exist in different areas of the world. In some parts of the UK it can be called dinner or lunch, with the last meal called tea.

=== Variations of lunch ===
A packed lunch (also called pack lunch, sack lunch or bag lunch in North America, or packed lunch in the United Kingdom, as well as the regional variations: bagging in Lancashire, Merseyside and Yorkshire,) is a lunch prepared at home and carried to be eaten somewhere else, such as school, a workplace, or at an outing. The food is usually wrapped in plastic, aluminum foil, or paper and can be carried ("packed") in a lunch box, paper bag (a "sack"), or plastic bag. While packed lunches are usually taken from home by the people who are going to eat them, in Mumbai, India, tiffin boxes are most often picked up from the home and brought to workplaces later in the day by so-called dabbawallas. It is also possible to buy packed lunches from stores in several countries. Lunch boxes made out of metal, plastic or vinyl are now popular with today's youth. Lunch boxes provide a way to take heavier lunches in a sturdier box or bag. It is also environmentally friendly.

=== Meal deal ===
Another variation of lunch is the meal deal, this is a meal often bought from a store and contains the following: a sandwich or pastry, a bag of chips, salad or fruit and a bottled drink. Meal deals are a staple of many Western high-street supermarkets and convenience stores; they are generally offered at a deal price and are highly convenient for the busy working person. Some stores are now adding premium meal deal items and salads to their meal deal inventory. Critics, however, criticise the meal deal for increasing the levels of single-use plastic waste in circulation and persuading people to buy more food than they originally intended or wanted - contributing to the growing obesity crisis.

== Dinner ==
Dinner usually refers to a significant and important meal of the day, which can be the noon or the evening meal. However, the term dinner can have many different meanings depending on the culture; it may mean a meal of any size eaten at any time of the day. Historically, it referred to the first big meal of the day, eaten around noon, and is still sometimes used for a noon-time meal, particularly if it is a large or main meal. For example, Sunday dinner is the name used for a large meal served after the family returned home from the morning's church services, and based on meat that roasted while the family was out. This term is still used to signify that Sunday dinner is special even if no longer preceded by attendance at church.

The evening meal can be called tea when dinner, which is generally the largest of the day, is eaten in the middle of the day.

=== Variations of dinner ===
==== Full course dinner ====
A full-course dinner is a dinner consisting of multiple dishes, or courses. In its simplest, English-based form, it can consist of three to five courses, such as appetizers, fish course, entrée, main course and dessert. The traditional courses and their order vary by culture. In the Italian meal structure, there are traditionally four formal courses: antipasto (appetizers), primo (the "first" course, e.g., a pasta dish), secondo (the "second" course, e.g., fish or meat), usually accompanied by a contorno (a side dish), and dolce ("sweets", or dessert).

Many traditions conclude a formal meal with coffee, sometimes accompanied with spirits, either separate or mixed in the coffee.

== Meal preparation ==
Meal preparation, sometimes called "meal prep," is the process of planning and preparing meals. It generally involves food preparation, including cooking, sometimes together with preparing table decorations, drinks etc.

=== Food preparation ===
Preparing food for eating generally requires selection, measurement and combination of ingredients in an ordered procedure so as to achieve desired results. Food preparation includes but is not limited to cooking.

==== Cooking ====
Cooking or cookery is the art, technology and craft of preparing food for consumption with the use of heat. Cooking techniques and ingredients vary widely across the world, from grilling food over an open fire to using electric stoves, to baking in various types of ovens, reflecting unique economic, environmental and cultural traditions and trends. The ways or types of cooking also depend on the skill and kind of training an individual cook has. Cooking is done both by people in their own dwellings and by professional cooks and chefs in restaurants and other food establishments. Cooking can also occur through chemical reactions without the presence of heat, most notably with ceviche, a traditional South American dish where fish is cooked with the acids in lemon or lime juice.

== History ==
Breakfast before the 1800s was usually just toast or some variation of gruel or porridge and the main meal was dinner. Peasants (which were the majority in every country) had dinner around noon, after six or seven hours of work.

Then, in the late 1700s and the 1800s, people began to work further from home, and the midday meal had to become something light, just whatever they could carry to work (lunch). They began to eat dinner (the main meal) in the evening.

== Eating the meal ==
Throughout history, meals were normally communal affairs. People got together, shared the food, and perhaps talked over the day.

In the 21st century, an increasing number of adults in developed countries eat most or all of their meals alone. Although more people are eating alone, research suggests that many people do not consider a "meal" a solo act, but rather commensal dining. It is unclear if people eating alone eat more, less, or the same amount of food compared to people eating in groups, partly because of differences in whether they are eating alone at home or eating alone in restaurants.

Restaurants have responded to the increasing number of people eating alone by accepting reservations for solo diners and installing bar seating and large tables that solo diners can share with others.

== See also ==
- Outline of meals
- Food
- Human digestive system
- Meal replacement
- Substantial meal (UK and Ireland)
- Suspended meal
