= Supper =

Evening meal

Supper commonly refers to the main evening meal, although it can also denote a light or late-evening snack either after or instead of the main meal. In the United Kingdom it is traditionally used to describe an informal main evening meal, as opposed to a dinner or dinner party.

== Etymology ==
The term is derived from the French souper, which is used for this meal in Canadian French, Swiss French, and in Belgian French. It is related to soup. It is also related to the Scandinavian words for soup, soppa or suppe, the German word for soup, Suppe and the Catalan word for soup sopa; in Catalan dinner is also called sopar. The Oxford English Dictionary, however, suggests that the root, sup, remains obscure in origin.

== History ==
White-Jacket, Chapter VII: Breakfast, Dinner, and Supper.

Though in respect of the dinner hour on board a man-of-war, [sailors] have no reason to complain; yet they have just cause, almost for mutiny, in the outrageous hours assigned for their breakfast and supper. Eight o'clock for breakfast; twelve for dinner; four for supper; and no meals but these; no lunches and no cold snacks.

— Herman Melville, 1850

Supper was originally a secondary lighter evening meal. The main meal of the day, called dinner, used to be served closer to what is known as lunchtime, around the middle of the day, but crept later over the centuries, mostly over the course of the 19th century. When dinner was still at the early time, eating a lighter supper in the evening was very common; it was not always the last meal of the day, as there might be a tea later. Reflecting the typical custom of 17th century elites, Louis XIV dined at noon, with a supper at 10 pm. Even when dinner was in the early evening, supper was served at a ball, or after returning from it, and might be after other evening excursions. At an English ball in 1791, supper was served to 140 guests at 1:00 am. They would all have had dinner at home many hours earlier, before coming out. Other, grander, balls served supper even later, up to 3:30 am, at a London ball given in 1811 by the Duchess of Bedford.

== Modern usage ==
In modern usage "supper" may refer to, on largely class-based distinctions, either a late-evening snack (working- and middle-class usage) or else to make a distinction between "supper" as an informal family meal (which would be eaten in the kitchen or family dining room) as opposed to "dinner", especially as a "dinner party", a generally grander affair with guests from outside the household, which would be eaten in the best dining room. In South African English, supper is used for the main evening meal, and dinner tends to be reserved for a formal meal.

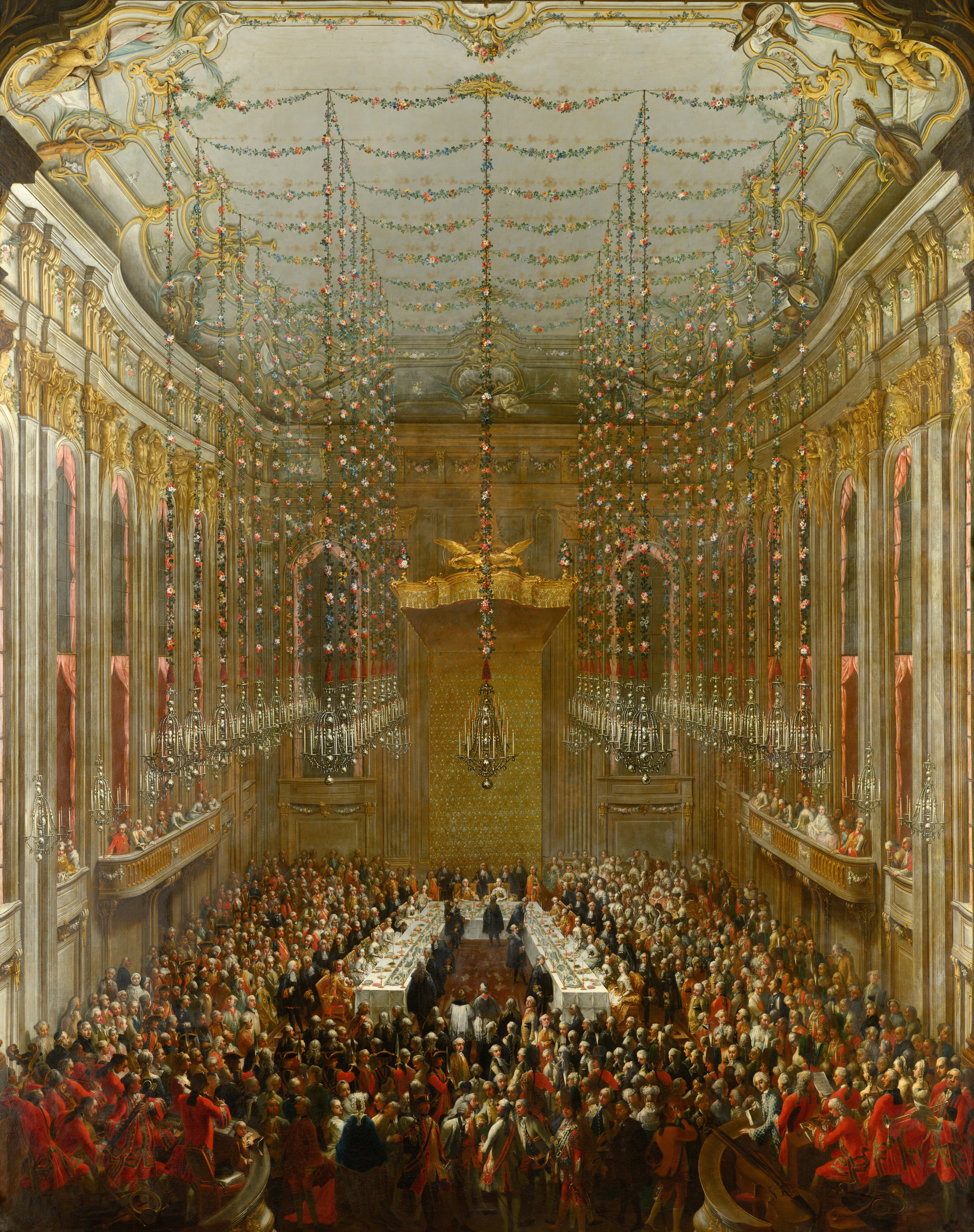
Wedding Supper by Martin van Meytens depicts the moment when the dessert is served, at the wedding of Princess Isabella of Parma and Joseph II, Holy Roman Emperor, on 5 October 1760, at Hofburg Palace.

Different cultures can usually bring supper to the table at different times. For example, According to The Daily Meal, in Norway it is customary to start eating at about four in the afternoon and in Australia between five and seven in the evening.

=== North America ===
The distinction between dinner and supper was common in North American farming communities into the 20th century, especially in the Midwest and the American South. Today, most Americans consider the two synonyms and strongly prefer the term dinner for the evening meal. During World War II, rations in the U.S. military were still divided into breakfast, dinner, and supper, using the traditional designations for meals. In most parts of the United States and Canada today, "supper" and "dinner" are considered synonyms (although supper is a more antiquated term).

In Saskatchewan, and much of Atlantic Canada, "supper" means the main meal of the day, usually served in the late afternoon, while "dinner" is served around noon. "Dinner" is used in some areas, such as Newfoundland and Labrador, to describe the noon meal as well as special meals, such as "Thanksgiving dinner", "Flipper dinner" or "Christmas dinner", the evening meal being "supper". The word "supper" is also regionally reserved for harvest meals put on by churches and other community organizations: "fowl suppers" or "fall suppers" (featuring turkey) are common in Canada; "pancake suppers" given by church groups were once a tradition in the United States; and "bean suppers" (featuring baked beans) were traditional in New England and especially the state of Maine.

=== British Isles ===
In Scotland, the traditional British dish of fish and chips is known as a "fish supper". In this context, supper refers to a meal typically enjoyed in the evening, consisting of a main course accompanied by thick-cut chips. In place of the fish, it may also feature other items, such as deep-fried pizza.

== See also ==
- Dinner
- Food history
- Supper club
