= Van Camp =

Van Camp is a surname. Notable people with the surname include:

- Aaron Van Camp (1816–1892), American Civil War spy
- Al Van Camp (1903–1981), American baseball player
- Benjamin Van Camp (born 1946), Belgian scientist
- Emily VanCamp (born 1986), Canadian actress
- Jeff Van Camp Sr. (born 1962), American police officer and professional wrestler
- Jeff Van Camp (born 1987), American football player, son of Jeff Van Camp Sr.
- Jorn Vancamp (born 1998), Belgian footballer
- Richard Van Camp (born 1971), Canadian writer
- Susan Van Camp (born 1959), American fantasy artist

== Other uses ==
- Van Camp, Wetzel County, West Virginia

== See also ==
- Van Camp's, ConAgra Foods brand
- Van Camp accounting, California property law accounting method
- Van Camp, Wetzel County, West Virginia, unincorporated community in the United States
- Wim van de Camp (vorn 1953), Dutch politician
- Merete Van Kamp (born 1961), Danish model and actress
- Van de Kamp, surname
- Stokely-Van Camp Industrial Complex, building in Trenton, New Jersey
- Potter-Van Camp House, historic house in Steuben County, New York
