= Gilbert Van Camp =

American businessman

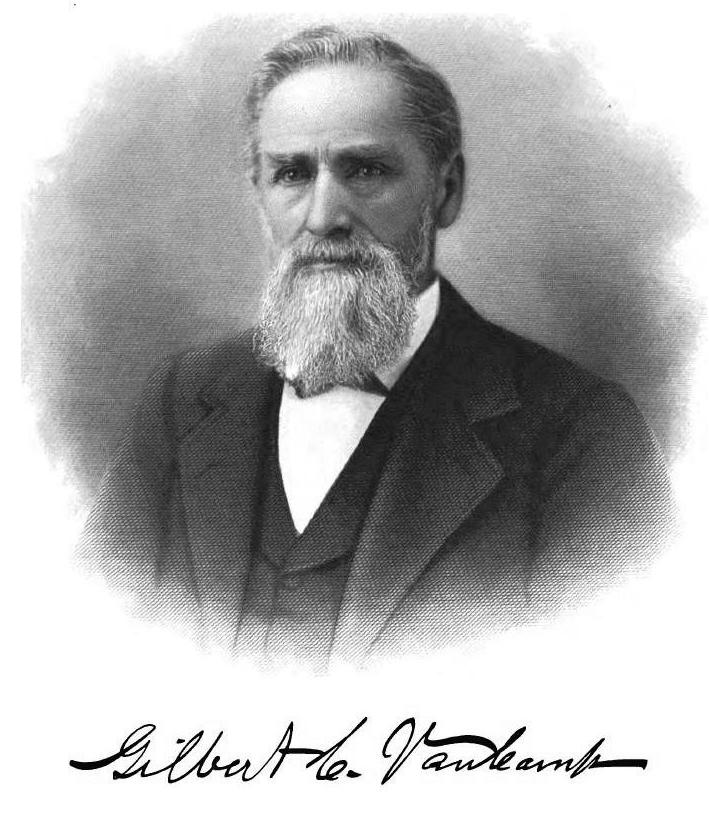
- Engraving of Gilbert C. Van Camp with facsimile of signature.
- Born: Gilbert C. Van Camp; December 25, 1814; Brookville, Indiana, U.S.
- Died: April 4, 1900; Indianapolis, Indiana, U.S.
- Occupation: Food Company founder

Gilbert C. Van Camp (25 December 1814 – 4 April 1900) was an American businessman from Indianapolis who founded the Van Camp's canning company.

== Life ==
He was born in Brookville, Indiana, to Charles and Mary (Halstead) Van Camp, of Dutch descent. His father was a farmer and wagon maker. In 1844 he married Mary Ann Gregg, who died five years later. In 1850 he married Hester Jane Raymond (1828–1912), the daughter of Thomas and Amy (Fluelling) Raymond, a farming family in Franklin County. They had nine children, five of whom survived infancy: Mary, Cortland (1852–1923), Clara (1858–1943), George (d. 1926), and Frank (1864–1937). As a young man he professed Methodism, later switching to Presbyterianism. He was a founding organizer of the Fifth Presbyterian Church of Indianapolis in October, 1867, but in 1890 it voted to become a Congregational church and he moved to the Second Presbyterian Church. He died in Indianapolis, and is buried in the Crown Hill Cemetery there.

== Business beginnings ==
When he was 17 he went to work at a flour mill near his home and learned the trade of miller. At the end of four years he opened a store selling tinware and stoves with a partner. Van Camp learned the trade of tinsmithing, making much of the merchandise he sold at the Brookville store. After four years he sold his interest and from 1845 to 1860 he worked as a tinsmith around Greensburg. In 1861 he went to Indianapolis and with Martin Williams and Calvin Fletcher, a fruit grower and a financier, built a cold storage warehouse to store fruits, meats, and other perishables. In 1862 he expanded into canning raspberries, blackberries, peaches and tomatoes in six-gallon cans. The products were sold to retail grocers, who resold the contents by the pint and quart and returned the cans for refilling. The fruit farm belonging to the company could not meet the demand, so they sent out packers with wagons loaded with cans and cooking pans to can the fruit in the orchards and haul it back to Indianapolis. In 1868 the business moved into larger quarters, where it continued canning tomatoes, peaches and berries. In 1877 or 1878 the name of the packing house was changed to G. C. Van Camp & Son.

In 1879 the company went bankrupt, and after the reorganization Van Camp launched Van Camp Packing Co. in 1882, narrowing his product line from canned tomatoes, corn, peas, jellies, preserves, fruit butters and mince meat to the first three. In 1891 a fire wiped out the business and the Van Camps began again, but in 1894 the country went through an economic depression, causing Van Camp to search for something more substantial than the limited pack vegetable market on which to build a permanent business.

== Pork and beans ==
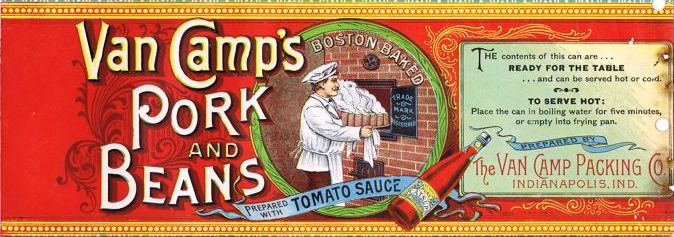
Early can label, c. 1900

In 1894 an Indianapolis jobber brought a load of canned baked beans to the Van Camp plant to have them reprocessed. At lunch time, Frank Van Camp, the founder's son, opened a can from the jobbing house to eat with his lunch. The flavor of the beans was flat, so to make them more palatable he added some Van Camps' ketchup, originating "Van Camp's Pork and Beans with Tomato Sauce." The first sale was for a car load delivered in Pittsburgh.

In December 1894 the Van Camps placed a small want ad in the Indianapolis News seeking house-to-house canvassers to sell cans of pork and beans, to which 300 responded. The next year the company sold 67,030 cases of beans. The company began advertising in several cities with street car cards, outdoor signs and three-sheet posters. In 1896 magazine advertisements began running in national magazines, and a strongly organized sales force was dispatched in the field. In 1898 the company used 6 million tin cans for its operation. By the turn of the century the company was spending $1.5 million on advertising and was running six plants spread out across the country canning evaporated milk as well as beans, and by 1909, Van Camp's was the dominant vendor of pork and beans.
