= Captain Beany =

British eccentric and fundraiser (born 1954)

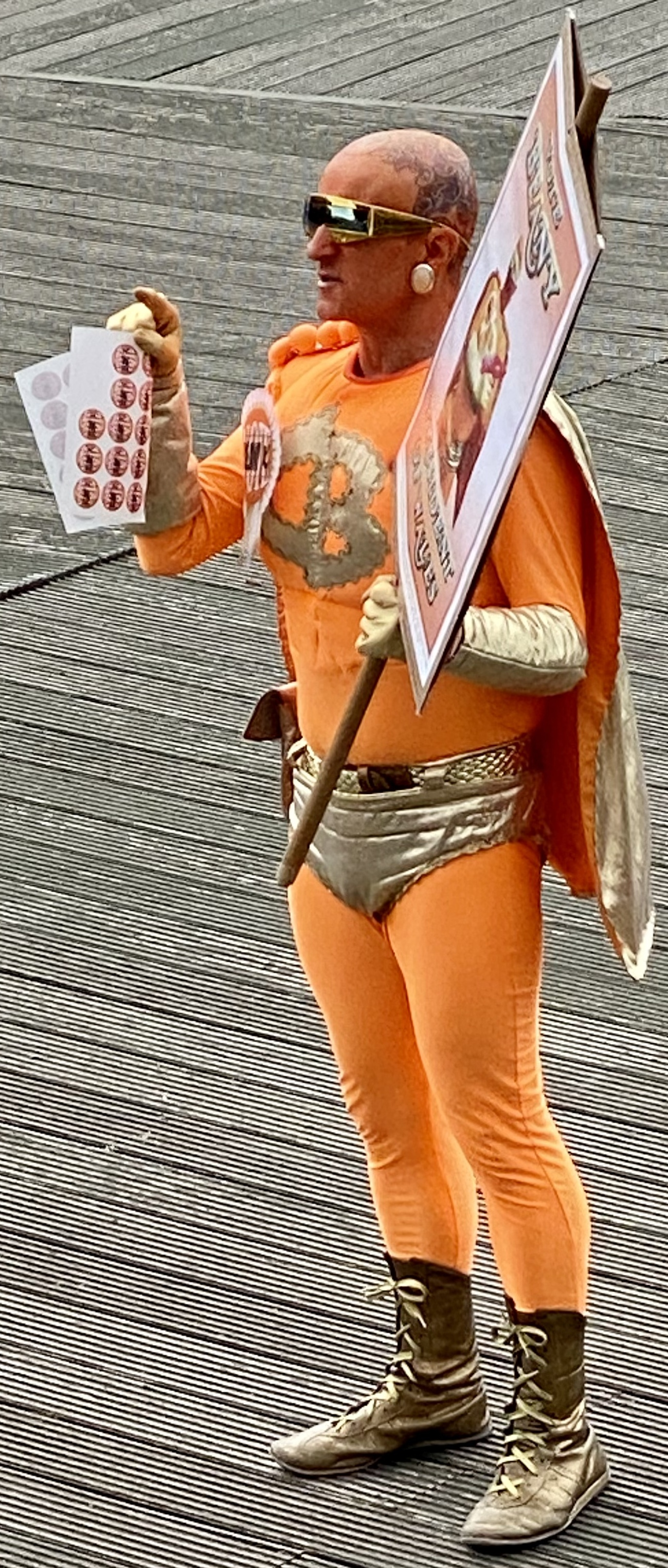
- Beany in 2021

Personal details
- Born: Barry Kirk; 23 September 1954 (age 71)
- Party: New Millennium Bean Party
- Website: captainbeany.com

Captain Beany (born Barry Kirk on 23 September 1954) is a British eccentric and charity fundraiser in Sandfields, Port Talbot, South Wales.

He has performed several fundraising stunts themed around baked beans, and for several years operated the Baked Bean Museum of Excellence from his home.

== Biography ==
Kirk worked in the computer department of the BP chemical plant in Baglan, Neath Port Talbot. In May 1991, he changed his name by deed poll to Captain Beany. He began painting his face and bald head orange, donned a golden cape, pants, gloves and boots. To date, Captain Beany claims to have raised over £100,000 for charity through participation in various events, such as the London and New York Marathons.

In 1986, Beany set a world record for the longest time sitting in a bath full of baked beans, which lasted over 100 hours.

In September 2005, Beany was convicted and fined £200 for fraudulently claiming £2,700 in Income Support.

In 2006, Beany appeared on the BBC programme, Let Me Entertain You.

In September 2008, Beany climbed Snowdon carrying baked beans in aid of cancer research. In October 2008, during the 2008 financial crisis, he registered the trademark "Credit Crunch" for use on chocolate bars. When Selfridges sold a similarly named product, Captain Beany earned a percentage of the sales under a licensing agreement.

In December 2009, he teamed up with other Port Talbot musicians to record a charity Christmas song. He completed the Sports Relief Mile 2010 whilst pushing a tin of baked beans on his hands and knees.

He also planned to walk nearly 460 miles around the borders of Wales and England for the Cieran Jones Appeal whilst conveying a plate of baked beans on toast. His planned 'BEANS ON TOAST-A-THON' was to take place in mid August 2010.

In 2015, Beany raised £3,600 for charity by having 60 baked bean images tattooed on his head. Those sponsoring him had their initials inked inside one of the baked beans.

In 2018, Beany appeared on a Christmas special of Blind Date as one of the choices. He wasn't chosen.

In 2022, Captain Beany appeared on Inside the Superbrands. In the same year he was mentioned in one of the final rounds of the Jackbox Party Pack 9 game Fibbage 4.

In May 2024, Beany auditioned for the seventeenth series of Britain’s Got Talent where he sang an original song about baked beans and how he loved to eat them for every single meal of the day. He received four red buzzers and did not progress to the next round.

== Eccentric of the year ==
In April 2009, Beany was awarded the title of "Great British Eccentric of the Year" by the Eccentric Club in London. He also officially transformed his council flat into the Baked Bean Museum of Excellence, with British writer Danny Wallace presiding over the opening ceremony.

The Baked Bean Museum of Excellence in Port Talbot was featured in the 2010 book Behind The Scenes at the Museum of Baked Beans by author Hunter Davies.

In 2023, Beany closed his museum, due to renovations being done by the housing provider Tai Tarian. The collection was auctioned off on eBay with Beany downsizing to a one bedroom flat.

== Political career ==
Beany has been a candidate in local and general elections throughout Wales. He stood as "Captain Beany of the Bean Party" in the 1991 Neath by-election, coming last with 262 votes (0.7%). He then stood as the "Real Bean" candidate in Aberavon in 1992, again coming last with 707 votes (1.8%). In 1997, he stood in Aberavon again, this time as an Independent, and came last again with 341 votes (1.0%).

In 2000, he formed the New Millennium Bean Party, of which he was the sole member. On this line in Aberavon in the 2001 election, he came sixth out of seven candidates with 727 votes (2.4%), coming ahead of Socialist Alliance candidate Martin Chapman. In the 2005 general election, Beany gained 159 votes (0.4%) in Cardiff Central coming eighth out of nine candidates, ahead of Rainbow Dream Ticket candidate Catherine Taylor-Dawson. Beany contested Aberavon again in the 2010 general election, receiving 558 votes (1.8%), placing seventh out of eight candidates, ahead of UKIP candidate Joe Callan.

In the 2015 general election, support for Beany more than doubled, to 1,137 votes (3.6%), who stood as an independent, placing sixth out of nine candidates ahead of the Green, Socialist Labour and TUSC candidates in Aberavon. After failing to contest the 2017 general election, he contested Aberavon once again in the 2019 general election and support for Beany fell to 731 votes (2.3%), placing him sixth out of seven candidates, ahead of the Green candidate.

In 2021, Beany contested the Senedd election in Cardiff West, and gained 95 votes (0%), placing ninth out of nine candidates, losing to the then first minister of Wales, Mark Drakeford. In the 2024 general election, Beany stood as an independent in the newly created constituency of Aberafan Maesteg, gaining 618 votes (1.7%) coming seventh out of eight candidates, ahead of Rhiannon Morrissey of the Heritage Party. He announced he would not stand for any further elections.

In 2026, Beany once again contested the Senedd election in Afan Ogwr Rhondda, and gained 504 votes. He had promised to make the Senedd into a 'fully operational baked beans canning installation'.
