= Beans and franks =

Culinary dish

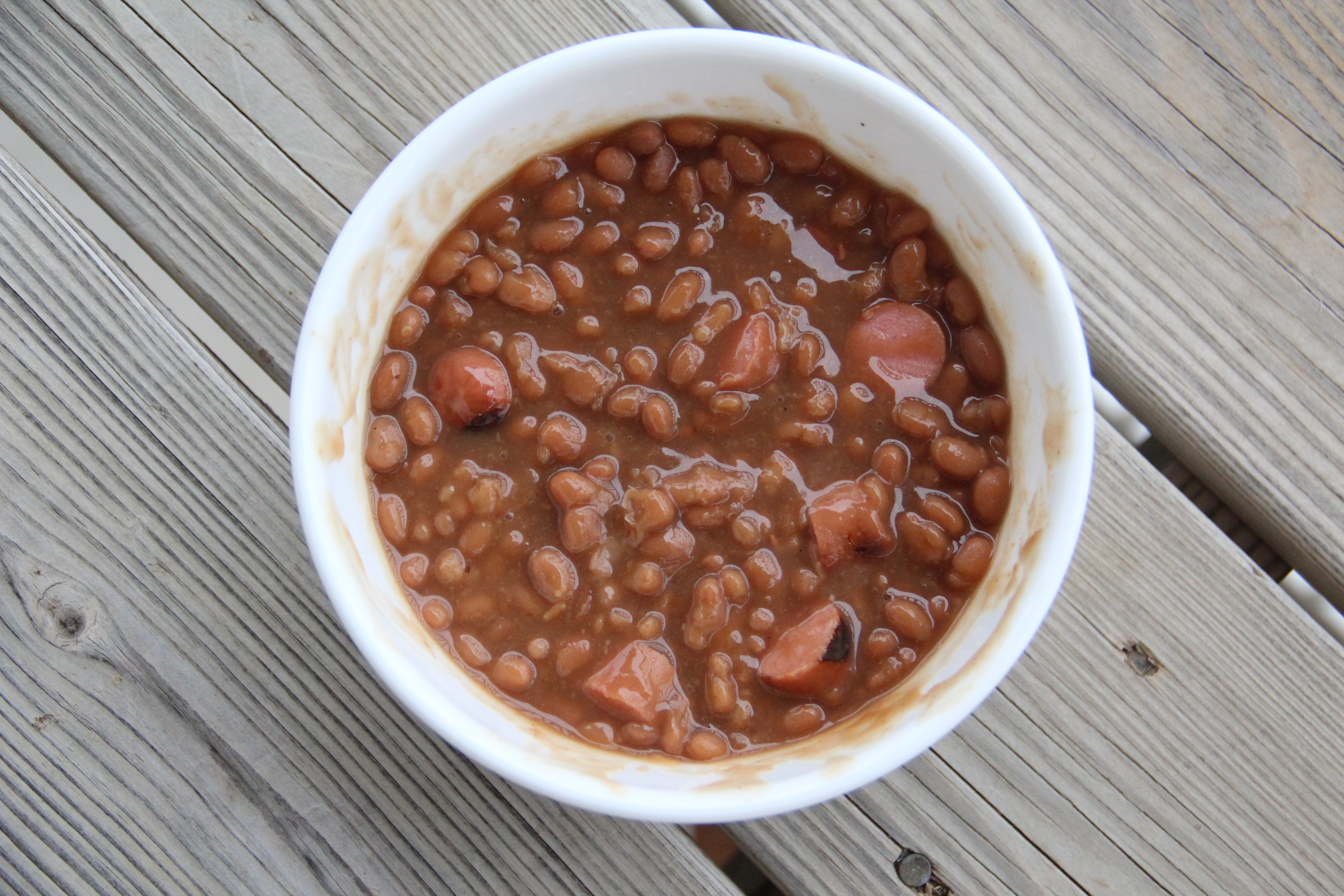
A bowl of beans and franks

Beans and franks or franks and beans is a dish consisting of baked beans and hot dog sausages. It can be served as a main course or a side dish and is often served in informal settings. It is similar to pork and beans, but substitutes hot dogs for pork. In the United States, July 13 is National Beans 'n' Franks Day.

== History ==
Baked beans were among the first canned "convenience foods" to emerge in the United States, dating back to the Civil War. The exact originator of the concept of combining hot dogs and baked beans is unknown. However, is most commonly credited to Charles Dumberger for making it famous during his time as cook during World War II. Van Camp's sells a canned version under the brand name Beanee Weenee.

== Ingredients ==
The standard recipe is simply canned baked beans (and juices) and sliced hot dogs, though more complex recipes have included brown sugar, onion, mustard, barbecue sauce, and various herbs and spices.
