= Baconique meal =

A baconique meal (French: repas baconique) was a French meal consisting entirely of various preparations of pork, either fresh or salt. The term was supposedly in use until the sixteenth century, and "proves that the word bacon is indeed a word of French origin" according to Larousse.
