= Tenderoni (disambiguation) =

Tenderoni is a trademarked stovetop macaroni product, now no longer produced, and the slang term derived from it.

Tenderoni may also refer to:

- "Tenderoni" (Chromeo song), a 2007 song by the Canadian band Chromeo
- Tenderoni (drag king)
- "Tenderoni" (Kele Okereke song), a 2010 song by UK performer Kele
