= Frank Van Camp =

American businessman (1863–1937)

Frank Van Camp (January 21, 1863 – November 11, 1937) was an American businessman who founded the Van Camp Seafood Company, now known as Chicken of the Sea. He introduced various innovations in the seafood industry, such as refrigerated fishing boats, and has been regarded as a "pioneer of the tuna industry."

== Early life ==
He was born in Brookville, Indiana, to Gilbert Van Camp, of Dutch descent, and Hester Jane Raymond. His father was the founder of the Van Camp's Canning Company.

== Career ==
=== Van Camp's Canning Company ===
Van Camp began working at his father's Van Camp's Canning Company as a young adult, eventually becoming Secretary-Treasurer. In 1894, an Indianapolis merchandiser brought a load of canned baked beans to the Van Camp plant to have them reprocessed. At lunch time, Van Camp opened a can to eat with his lunch. The flavor of the beans was flat, so to make them more palatable he added some Van Camps' ketchup, originating "Van Camp's Pork and Beans with Tomato Sauce."

After his father's death in 1900, Frank took over Van Camp's Canning Company. By 1909, Van Camp's was the dominant vendor of pork and beans in the United States. However, due to excessive gambling, the construction of a large mansion in Indianapolis, and unsuccessful attempts to enter the Midwest U.S. tomato market, Van Camp accrued debts of over $1,000,000 by 1912. Due to his financial difficulties, Van Camp was forced to sell 80% of his ownership share of the company to his lenders, effectively ending his association with Van Camp's, which was eventually sold to Campbell Soup. Shortly afterwards, Van Camp moved from Indianapolis to California.

=== Van Camp Seafood Company ===
In 1914, Van Camp and his son Gilbert purchased the California Tuna Canning Company and changed its name to the Van Camp Seafood Company. The phrase "Chicken of the Sea", first devised as a way to describe the taste, was so successful that soon it also became the company name. In 1916, Van Camp expanded the company internationally, partnering with Japanese seafood companies and the Imperial Fisheries Institute of Tokyo. Van Camp introduced various innovations in the seafood industry, such as refrigerated fishing boats.

In 1922, Van Camp led the merger of his company with White Star Canning Company. During this period, Van Camp was also the President of the Southern California Fish Canners' Association. By the early 1930s, the company acquired its own fishing fleet and had 67 boats.

In 1934, Van Camp played a critical role during the fishermen's and cannery workers' industrial strike. He refused to recognize the union and instead attempted to form a company union. Over one thousand workers and union activists congregated outside of the Van Camp cannery, demanding that they have their own union. Eventually, Van Camp locked out the strikers and requested the local police to suppress the strike.

== Death ==
Van Camp died in 1937 and is buried at Crown Hill Cemetery. At the time of his death, the Van Camp Seafood Company was the world's largest tuna packer.
