= Van Camp's =

American brand of canned beans

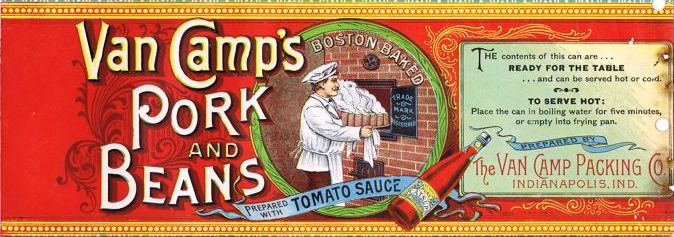
- A logo from c. 1900

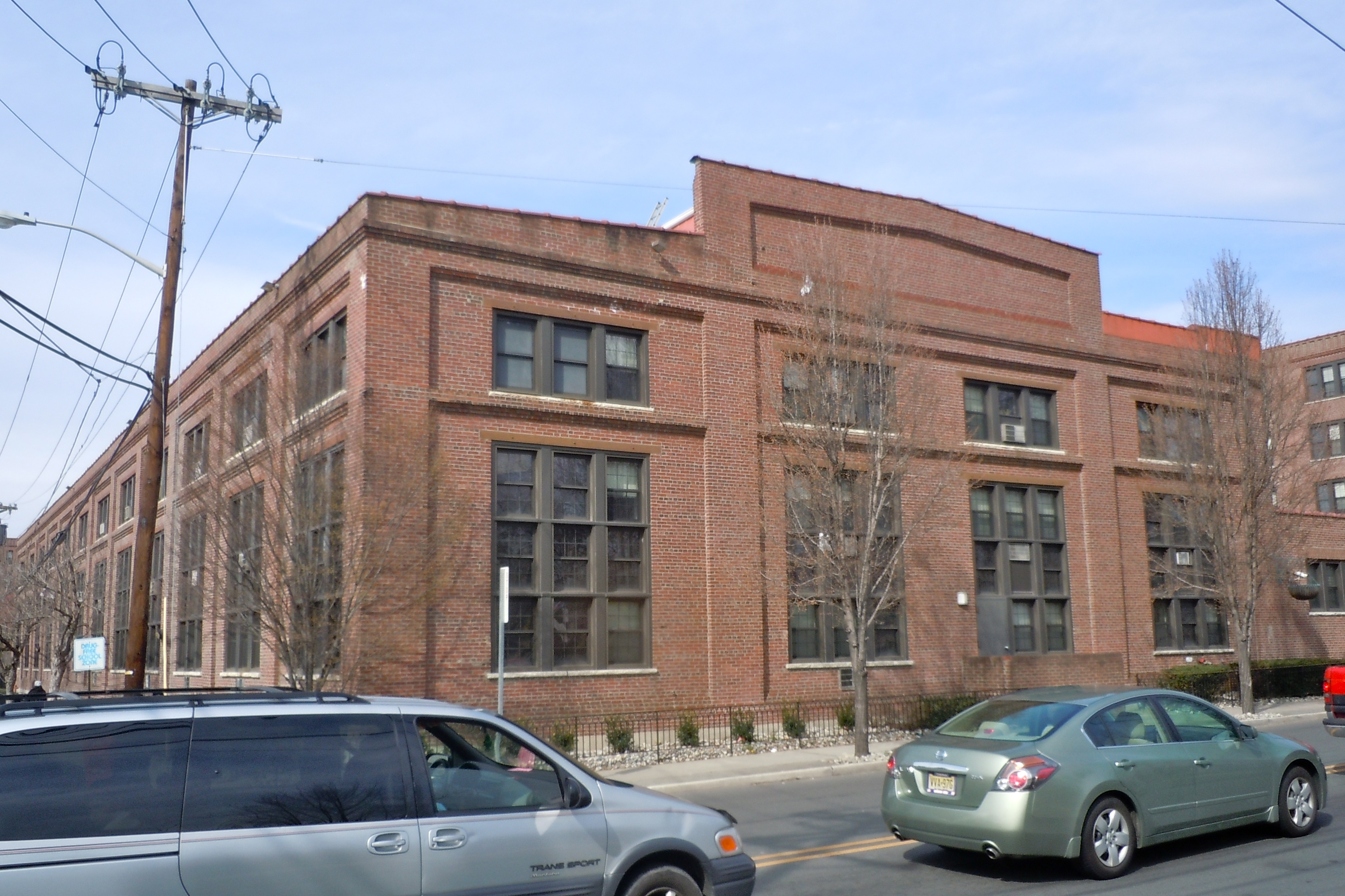
- The historic Stokely-Van Camp Industrial Complex, in Trenton, New Jersey
- Founders: Gilbert Van Camp, Calvin Fletcher, Martin Williams
- Products: Baked beans
- Parent: ConAgra Foods
- Website: www.vancampsbeans.com

Van Camp's is an American brand of canned bean products currently owned by ConAgra Foods, Inc. Their products typically consist of beans stewed in a flavored sauce.

== Founding ==
The brand traces its roots back to Indianapolis, where in 1861 Gilbert Van Camp and associates Calvin Fletcher and Martin Williams constructed what became the nation's first successful commercial cold storage warehouse. Primarily concerned with the preservation of fruits and vegetables, Van Camp quickly began experimenting with canning. By 1862 he had started to can fruits and vegetables in the summertime for winter consumption. Shortly thereafter, Van Camp secured a lucrative contract to supply Union troops during the Civil War.

Van Camp's pork and beans quickly became a wartime staple. Following the war, demand for canned food soared as returning veterans were eager to purchase the food that they had become familiar with. In 1882 the Van Camp Packing Company was founded. They started selling ketchup in 1888.

In 1894, his son Frank Van Camp first produced the now-famous recipe for pork and beans in tomato sauce. By 1898 the Van Camp Packing Company had increased annual production to six million cans. By 1909 Indiana, bolstered by the Van Camp family's company, became the nation's leading producer of canned baked beans. Frank Van Camp went on to found Van Camp Seafood.

== Company history ==
The firm is considered to have been a trendsetter in the canned-foods industry. In 1933, it was acquired by James and John Stokely, who operated the Stokely canned tomato company in Newport, Tennessee, forming Stokely-Van Camp, Inc. The resultant combined company headquartered in Indianapolis. In the 1940s, the company built two warehouses in Bellingham, Washington. By the 1970s, Stokely-Van Camp agreed to produce, market and distribute a new beverage called Gatorade. This product was the first sports drink, and eventually generated more in sales than the rest of SVC's other products combined.

== Sale and brand history ==
In 1983, Stokely-Van Camp was purchased by the Quaker Oats Company. Quaker Oats sold Van Camp's to ConAgra in 1995. Stokely was sold to Seneca Foods in 1985 and currently produces canned beans and other canned vegetables.

Over the years, a number of foods have been sold under the Van Camp's name, including its once popular Tenderoni pasta product. As of 2005 it only sells canned cooked beans, including pork and beans, baked beans, kidney beans, a vegetarian variant of its pork and bean recipe, chili, and Beanie Weenies, a mixture of beans with slices of frankfurter (made of beef and chicken) in tomato sauce.
