= Baked Bean Museum of Excellence =

Food museum in Port Talbot, Wales

- Location within Wales
- Established: January 2009
- Dissolved: 2023
- Location: Port Talbot, Wales, United Kingdom
- Coordinates: 51.5940222°N 3.8149896°W
- Type: Food museum
- Key holdings: Popular culture items related to baked beans
- Founder: Barry Kirk

The Baked Bean Museum of Excellence was a private museum located in Port Talbot, Wales, United Kingdom. The Baked Bean Museum Of Excellence closed in 2023.

== History ==
The museum was opened in 2009 by Barry Kirk, who changed his name by deed poll to Captain Beany. The museum was located in the living room, bathroom and kitchen of his council flat.

Beany closed the museum in 2023, saying that some of his collection would be donated to a museum in London.

== Exhibits ==
The museum contained examples of branded food cans, advertising and other promotional items associated with baked beans. There were also items from a number of food brands including Heinz, Crosse & Blackwell, Branston, HP and Van Camp's, as well as items relating to the comedy character Mr Bean. There were over 500 items in the museum, and Beany estimates that he had spent over £10,000 building his collection.

Unlike many museums, the Baked Bean Museum of Excellence had no gift shop on-site. Instead, Beany operated a market stall in local businesses on weekends, selling branded souvenirs of both the museum and of his Captain Beany persona.

== Culture ==
The museum was registered with the Association of Independent Museums. Comedian Danny Wallace was a patron. In 2018, the museum was the fourth most visited attraction in Port Talbot, according to figures by TripAdvisor.

In 2010, Beany believed that his was the only museum in the world dedicated to baked beans. In 2019, Heinz opened a museum, in the form of a pop-up "Beanz Museum" in Covent Garden London between 30 August and 1 September. The museum contained exhibitions about the Heinz brand to mark the company's 150th anniversary .

== See also ==
- Museums in Wales
- Tourism in Wales
