= Baked bean sandwich =

Type of sandwich

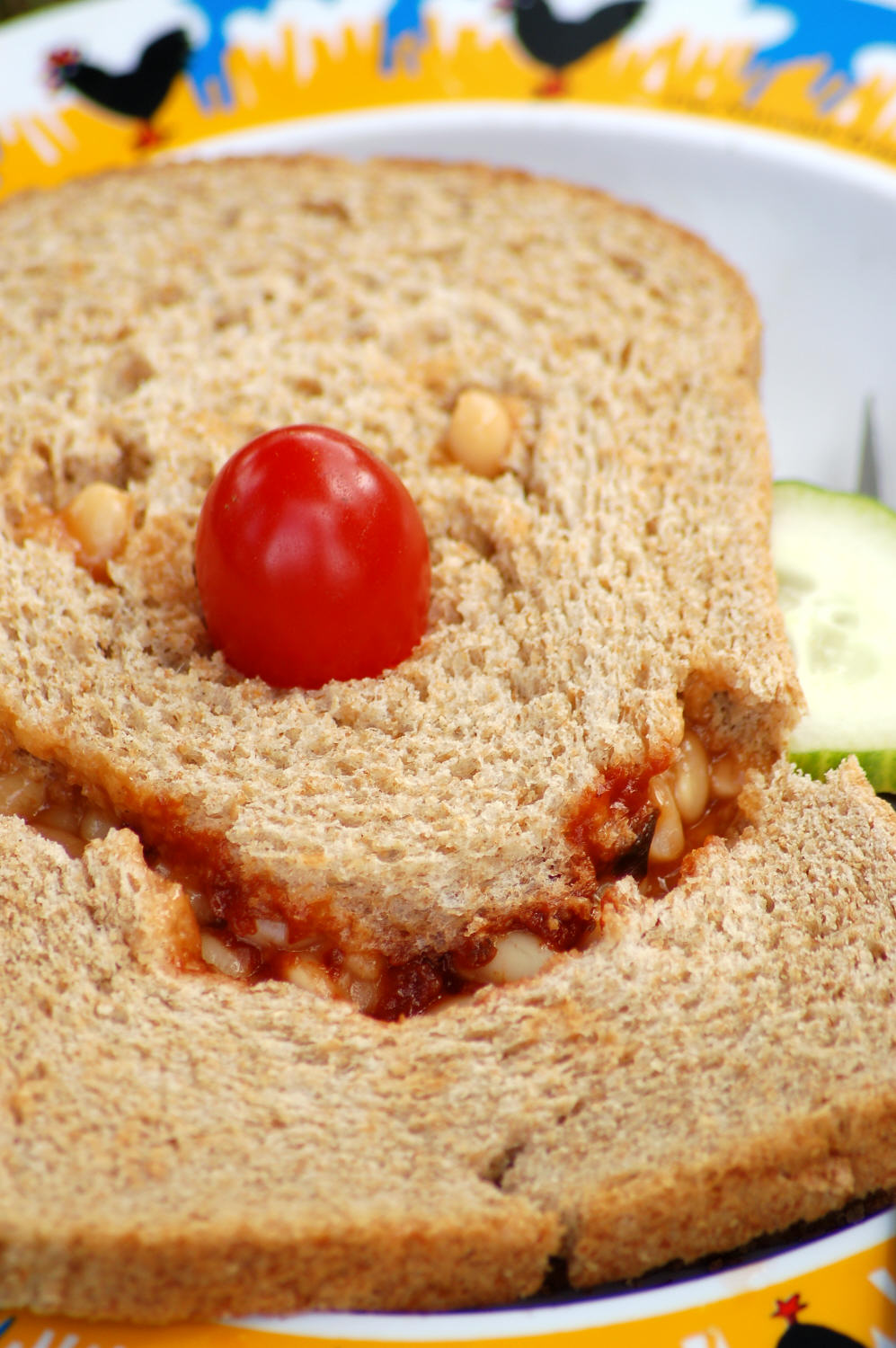
- A baked bean sandwich prepared for a child, torn and modified to resemble a smiling face
- Type: Sandwich
- Place of origin: United States
- Main ingredients: Bread, baked beans

The baked bean sandwich is a sandwich composed of cold baked beans between two slices of bread, which may include garnishes such as lettuce and toppings such as mayonnaise or ketchup. It is particularly popular in New England. It is distinct from the classic British dish beans on toast.

Recipes for a baked bean sandwich can be traced from as early as 1909. One book entitled Cooking For Two by Janet McKenzie Hill suggests such a recipe as a "substitute for meatless cooking", and is a much more elaborate sandwich compared to its most common manifestation in the 21st century. Hill suggests:

Butter two slices of Boston brown bread; on one of these dispose a heart-leaf of lettuce holding a teaspoon of salad dressing; above the dressing set a generous tablespoon of cold, baked beans, then another lettuce leaf and dressing; then finish with a second slice of bread, a tablespoonful of beans, a floweret of cauliflower, and a teaspoonful of dressing over the cauliflower.

The Boston-area version of the sandwich eschews toppings and garnishes, being composed simply of baked beans between two slices of Boston brown bread.

== See also ==
- List of sandwiches
