= Stokely-Van Camp Industrial Complex =

- U.S. National Register of Historic Places
- New Jersey Register of Historic Places
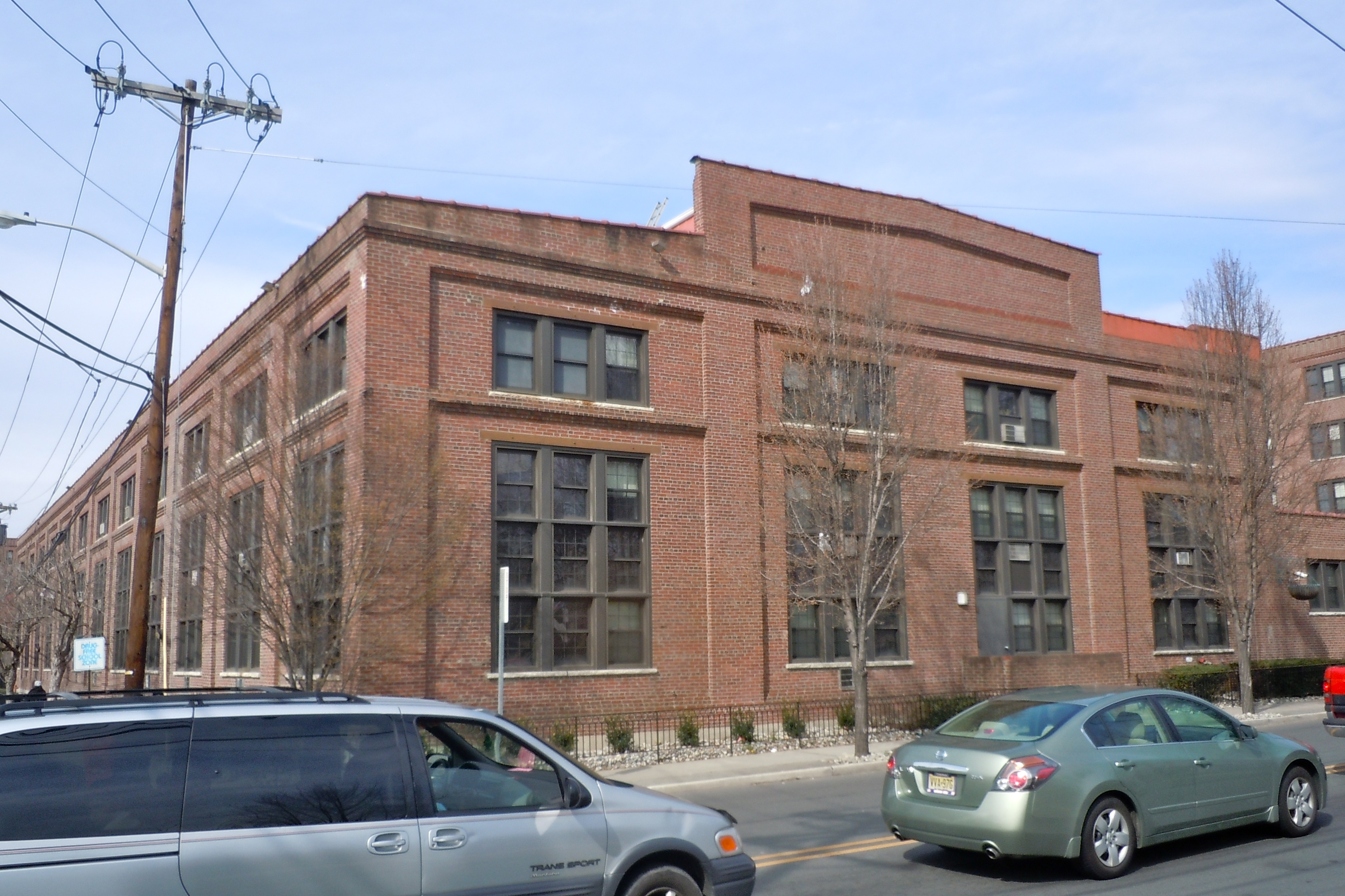

- Location within Mercer County, New Jersey Location within New Jersey Location within the United States
- Location: Lalor Street at Stokely Avenue, Trenton, New Jersey
- Coordinates: 40°11′59″N 74°45′16″W
- Area: 7.8 acres (3.2 ha)
- Built: 1845
- NRHP reference No.: 83001603
- NJRHP No.: 1797

Significant dates
- Added to NRHP: March 11, 1983
- Designated NJRHP: January 5, 1983

Stokely-Van Camp Industrial Complex is located in Trenton, Mercer County, New Jersey, United States. The Van Camp's company built the cannery to make baked beans under the direction of Gilbert Van Camp and later became Stokely-Van Camp. The building was built in 1845 and was added to the National Register of Historic Places on March 11, 1983.

== See also ==
- National Register of Historic Places listings in Mercer County, New Jersey
