= Van de Kamp =

Van de Kamp or Van der Kamp is a Dutch toponymic surname. A kamp originally was a fenced / enclosed piece of land. Notable people with the surname include:

- Anna van der Kamp (born 1972), Canadian rower
- Auke van de Kamp (born 1995), Dutch volleyball player
- Guido van de Kamp (born 1964), Dutch footballer
- Harry van der Kamp (1947–2026), Dutch bass singer and vocal ensemble leader
- John Van de Kamp (1936–2017), Los Angeles District Attorney and Attorney General of California
- Johannes van der Kemp (1747–1811), Dutch military officer, doctor, philosopher and also South African missionary.
- Marion van de Kamp (1925–2022), German actress and television announcer
- Peter van de Kamp (1901–1995), Dutch astronomer
- Bree van de Kamp Fictional character

== Fictional characters ==
- Bree Van de Kamp from the Desperate Housewives television series, which also included Rex Van de Kamp (her husband), Andrew Van de Kamp (son), Danielle Van de Kamp (daughter), and Phyllis Van de Kamp (mother-in-law)

== See also ==
- Wim van de Camp (born 1953), Dutch politician
- 1965 van de Kamp, asteroid
- Van de Kamp's Holland Dutch Bakeries, bakery founded in 1915 in Los Angeles by Theodore J. Van de Kamp
  - Van de Kamp's, a frozen battered seafood brand spin-off
  - Van de Kamp Bakery Building, designed to resemble a Dutch 16th century farmhouse
- Merete Van Kamp (born 1961), Danish model and actress
- Van Camp, surname
