= Pork and beans =

Culinary dish

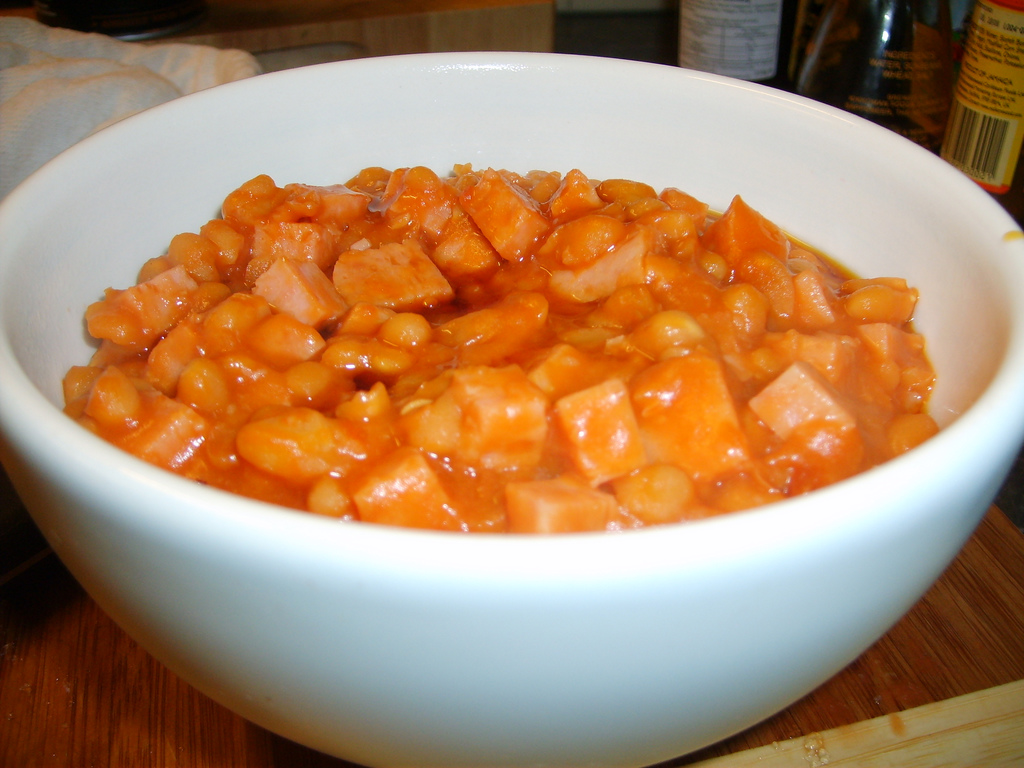
A bowl of pork and beans

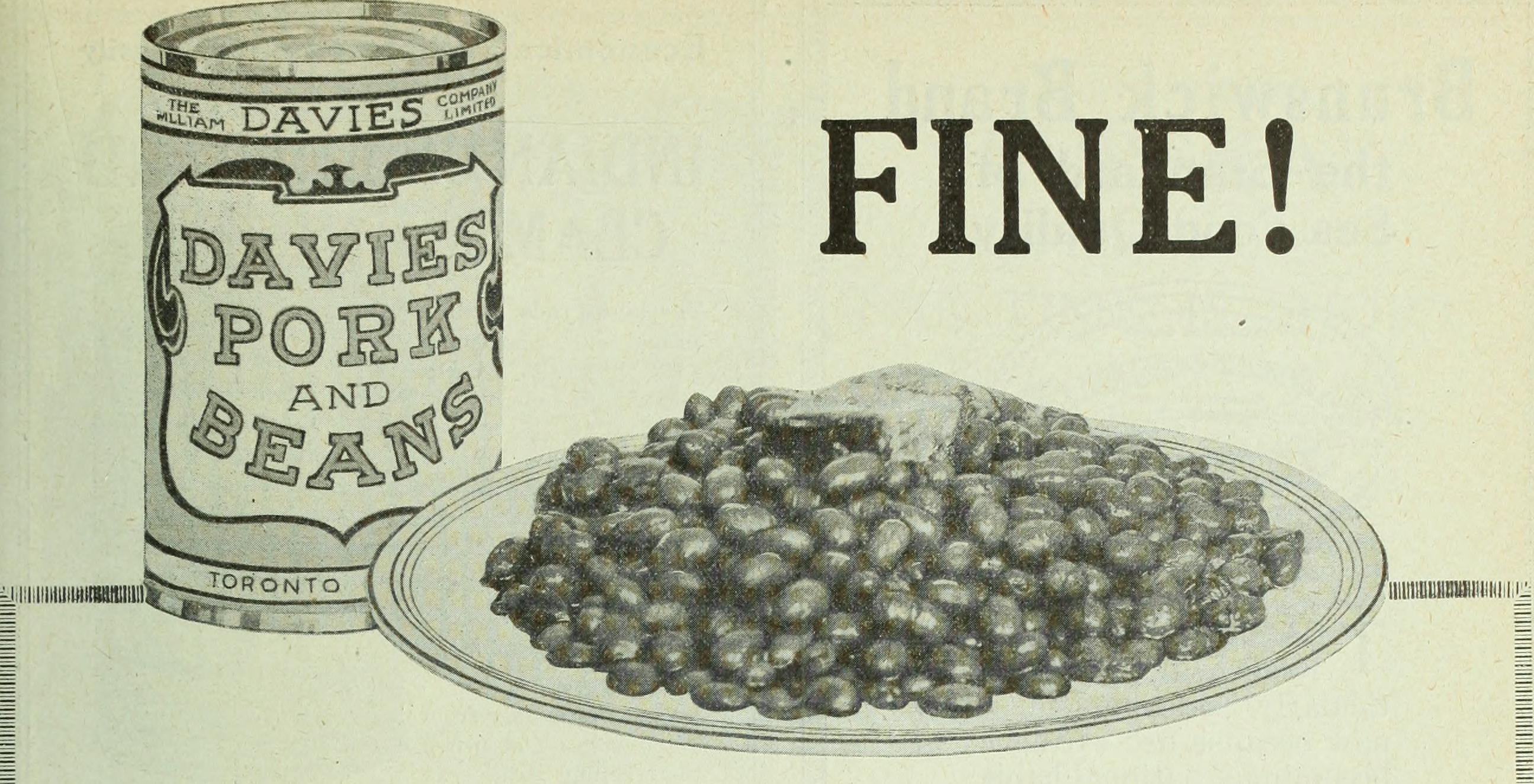
1918 Canadian grocer advertisement for pork and beans

Pork and beans is a culinary dish that uses pork and beans as its main ingredients. Numerous variations exist, usually with more specific names, such as fabada asturiana, olla podrida, or American canned pork and beans.

== American canned pork and beans ==
Although the time and place of the first appearance of American pork and beans is unclear, the dish was well established in the American diet by the mid-19th century. The 1832 cookbook The American Frugal Housewife lists only three ingredients for pork and beans: a quart of beans, a pound of salt pork, and pepper.

Commercially canned pork and beans were introduced in the United States sometime around 1880. According to the 1975 Better Homes and Garden Heritage Cookbook, canned pork and beans was the first convenience food. Today, the dish is "an American canned classic, [and] is recognized by American consumers generally as an article of commerce that contains very little pork."

The recipe for American commercially canned pork and beans varies slightly from company to company, but generally consists of rehydrated navy beans packed in tomato sauce (usually made from concentrate and which may incorporate starch, sugar, salt, and seasoning), with very small chunks of salt pork or rendered pork fat. The ingredients are cooked, packed into hermetically sealed containers, and processed by heat to assure preservation.

== See also ==
- Baked beans
- Beans and franks
- Boston baked beans
- Cowboy beans
- Feijoada
- Cassoulet
- List of pork dishes
- List of stews
