= Janet McKenzie Hill =

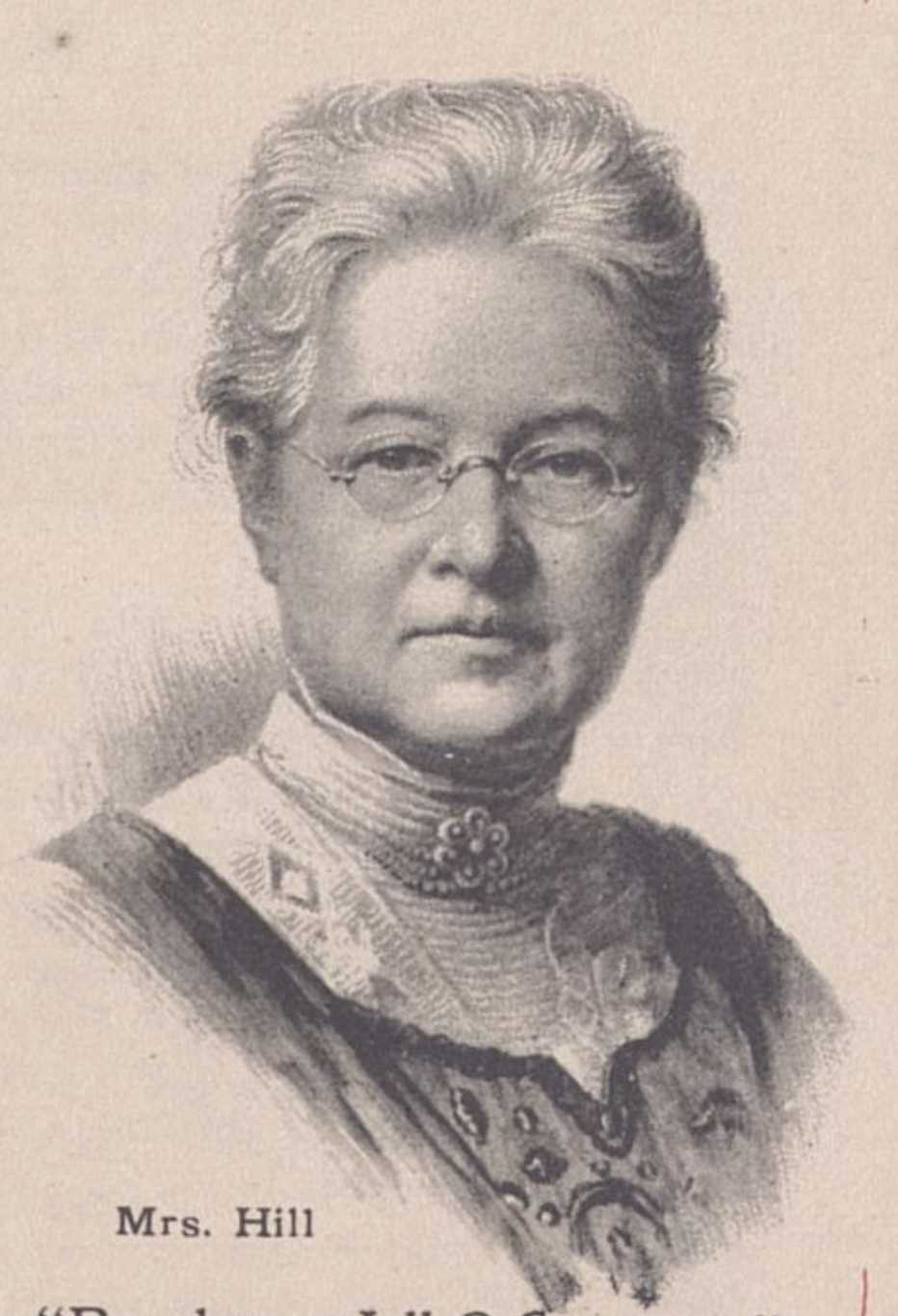
Hill c. 1912

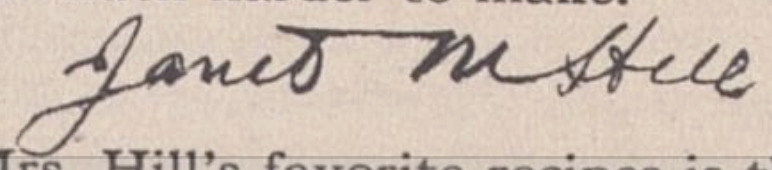
signature

Janet McKenzie Hill (December 13, 1852 – September 4, 1933) was an early practitioner of culinary reform, food science and scientific cooking. She wrote many cookbooks.

Hill was born in Westfield, Massachusetts, the daughter of Alexander McKenzie, a clergyman, and Nancy (Lewis) McKenzie. In 1873 she married Benjamin M. Hill. Hill took up the study of cooking and its related sciences later in life: she returned to school around age 40, graduating from the Boston Cooking School in 1892. Fannie Farmer was assistant principal at the time. In 1896 she founded the Boston Cooking School Magazine (later renamed American Cookery). Hill produced several cookbooks promoting the products of a particular company, a practice that began during this period. Alice Bradley, an 1897 graduate of the Boston Cooking School, who later bought Miss Farmer's Cooking school and was cooking editor of the Woman's Home Companion for twenty years, got her start doing cooking demonstrations for Hill. Hill died on September 4, 1933, at her home in Chatham, New Hampshire.

A small sample of Hill's work is the baked bean sandwich.

== Works ==
- Salads, sandwiches, and chafing dish dainties (1899) Little, Brown and Company.
- Practical cooking and serving (1902) Doubleday, Page & Company.
- A Short history of the banana and a few recipes for its use (1904) (for United Fruit Company)
- Cooking for two: a handbook for young housekeepers (1909) Little, Brown and Company.
- Dainty desserts for dainty people (1909) (for Knox Gelatine)
- Cooking and serving en casserole and things we relish (1910)
- The Book of entrees (1911) Little, Brown and Company.
- The Up-to-date waitress (1914) Little, Brown and Company.
- The American cook book; Recipes for everyday use (1914) The Boston Cooking-School Magazine Co.
- Nyal cook book (1916) (for Nyal Druggists)
- Chocolate and cocoa recipes (1916) (for Walter Baker & Co) (co-author: Maria Parloa)
- Canning, preserving, and jelly making (1917) Little, Brown and Company.
- Cakes, Pastry and Dessert Dishes (1917) Little, Brown and Company.
- War time recipes (1918)
- Practical Cooking And Serving (1919)
- Recipes for everyday (1919) (for Procter & Gamble Co.)
- Balanced daily diet (1920) (for Procter & Gamble Co.)
- The Rumford Way of Cookery and Household Economy (approx. 1920 for The Rumford Co.)
- Cakes, pastry, and dessert dishes (1930) Little, Brown and Company.
- The Cooks book (1933) (for Jaques Manufacturing Co.)
