= Van Camp, Wetzel County, West Virginia =

Van Camp
- Unincorporated community
- Location within the state of West Virginia Van Camp (the United States)
- Coordinates: 39°35′14″N 80°53′40″W
- Country: United States
- State: West Virginia
- County: Wetzel
- Elevation: 774 ft (236 m)
- Time zone: UTC-5 (Eastern (EST))
  - Summer (DST): UTC-4 (EDT)
- GNIS ID: 1553339

Van Camp is an unincorporated community in Wetzel County, West Virginia, United States.

Van Camp Marker Inscription: Village settled early 1800s, named for pioneer Steven(1793-1873) and family in 1840s. John and Margaret Van Camp gave land for Methodist E. Church, 1879; services held into 1940s; cemetery dates to 1851; site for school, ca. 1870-1920, given by family; post office & general store served the community. Clarksburg Northern Railroad provided access to village until early 20th century.
