= Beans on toast =

Light meal

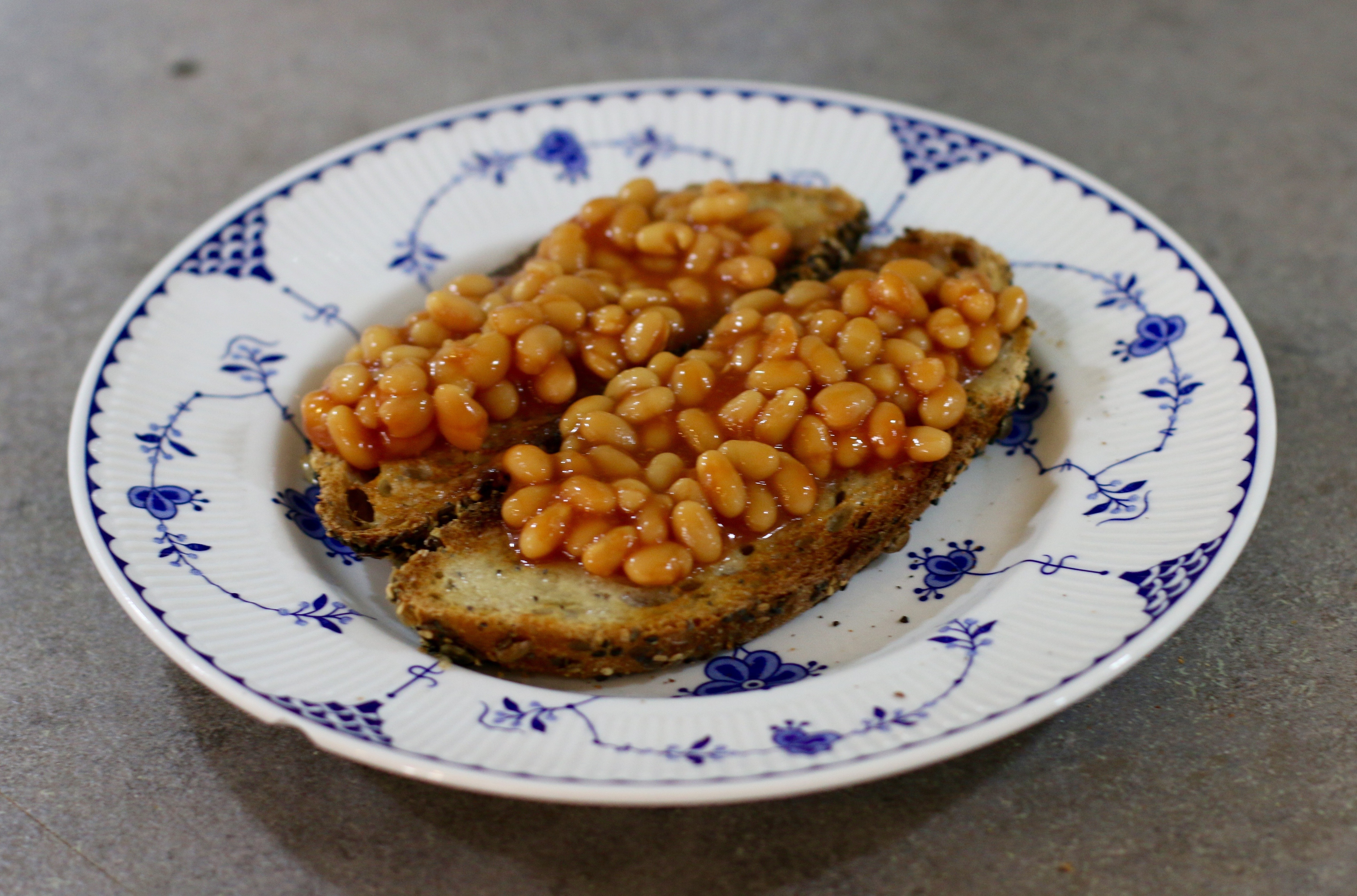
- Homemade beans on toast, with sourdough bread
- Type: Light meal
- Place of origin: United Kingdom
- Region or state: England
- Main ingredients: Toast; Baked beans

Beans on toast is a snack consisting of a slice of toast topped with baked beans. It is particularly popular in the United Kingdom and is widely associated with British cuisine.

== Preparation ==
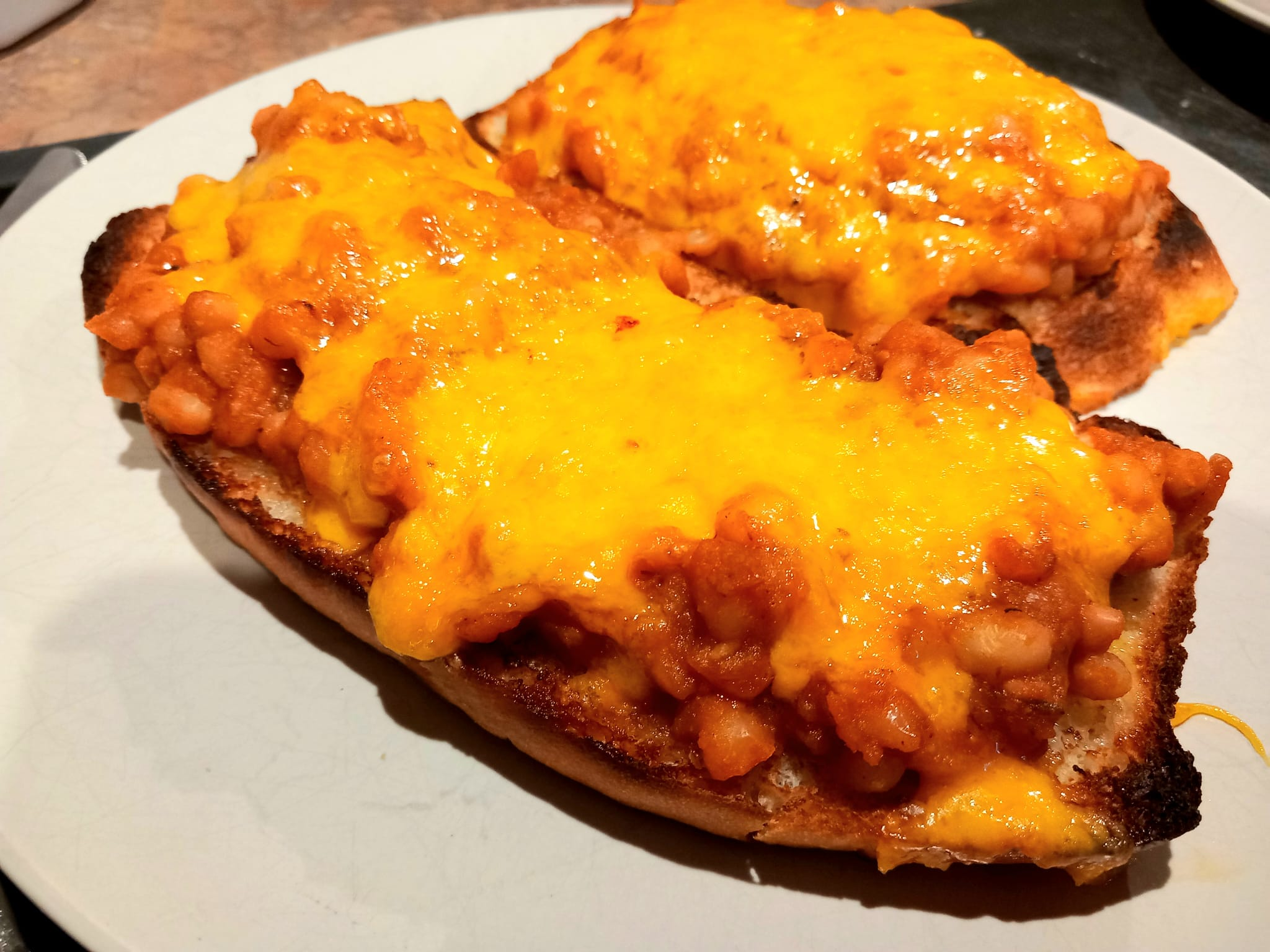
Homemade beans on toast, topped with melted cheddar cheese

At its core, the dish is any combination of baked beans on toast. Traditionally, the dish consists of British style baked beans—haricot beans, baked in a tomato sauce—on toasted bread. The bread may be either white bread or wholemeal bread, but would usually be a simple loaf rather than with added flavourings. Butter is usually spread on the toast first. Freshly baked beans may be used, but canned beans are traditional and most common. The beans are warmed, but not boiled. Some variations also call for grated cheese on top. Worcestershire sauce may be added into the beans while heating, and the dish may be served with tomato ketchup or brown sauce.

Beans on toast is contrasted with the baked bean sandwich, which, unlike beans on toast, has two slices of untoasted bread.

== Consumption ==
Beans on toast is, as one writer puts it, "a cheap and quick meal to make for breakfast, lunch, or dinner, and the ingredients are readymade and easy to find". Reflecting on this reputation, the anthropologist Mary Douglas wrote that if a person attended the house of someone they did not know well and were served beans on toast, it may indicate disdain and disrespect, or it may draw on the association of the dish as "homely" and indicate familiarity and intimacy.

In a 2026 YouGov survey on positive attitudes towards British dishes, beans on toast was ranked tenth highest, with 70% of respondents having a favourable view of the meal.

Americans often find the concept of beans on toast off-putting. This may be due to differences in their countries' respective baked bean recipes. American baked bean recipes are often sweetened with ingredients like molasses and flavoured with pork, while major baked bean brands popular in Britain, such as Heinz, typically do not include molasses or pork in their recipes and use simpler tomato-based recipes instead, which may contribute to a more savoury dish.

== History ==
Beans on toast were being eaten in Britain by the end of the 19th century, when records show them being served at the first Lyons Tea Rooms from 1894 in Piccadilly, London. There, the dish was eaten as a midday snack, accompanying tea. The Heinz company ran a marketing campaign called the "Joy of Living" in 1927 to encourage people to eat more beans. In 20th-century England, childhood slang for beans on toast included "skinheads", and "skins on a raft".
