= Fèves au lard =

Traditional Québécois dish

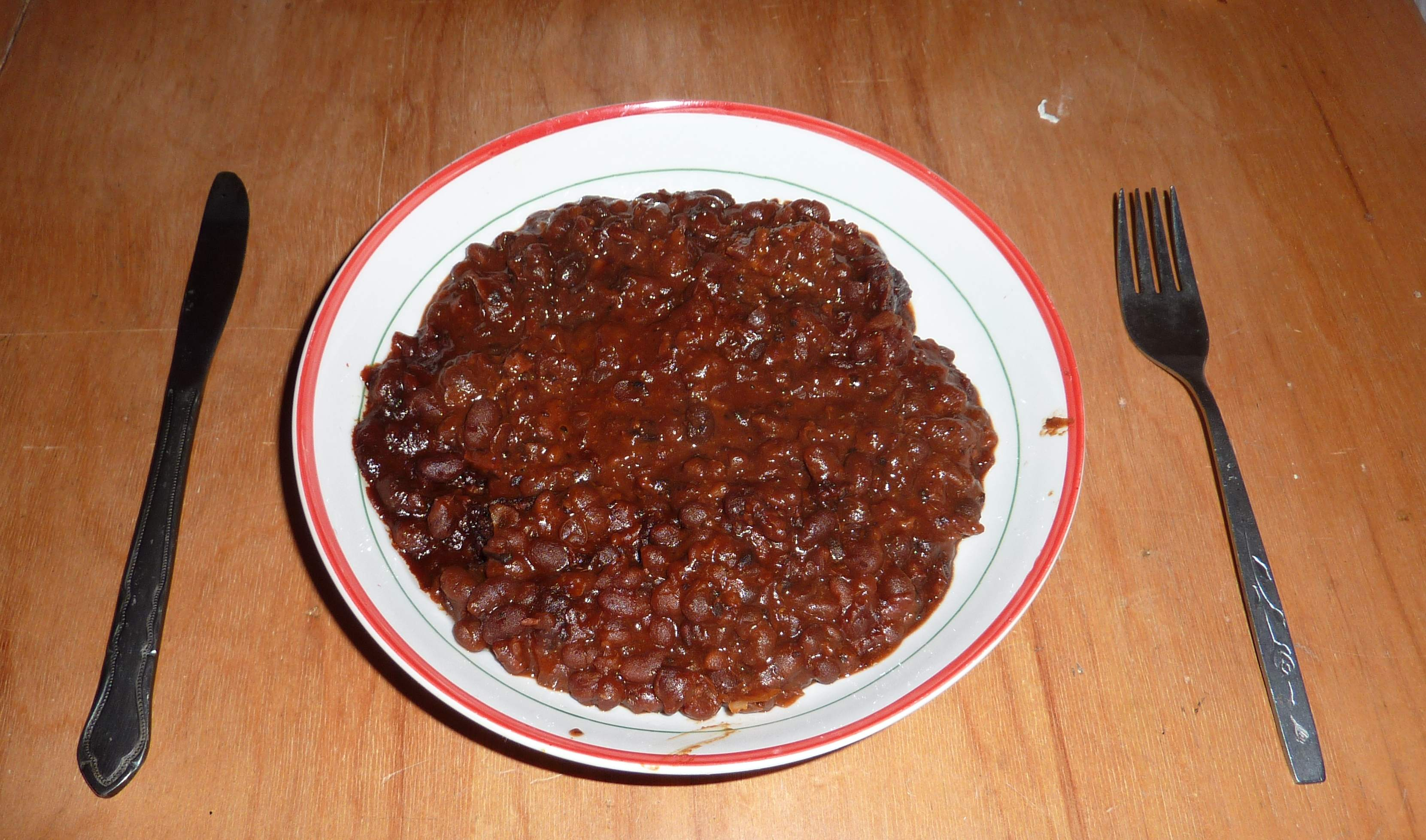
A large portion of Fèves au lard.

Fèves au lard, also called bines or haricots au lard, is a traditional Québécois dish. It is usually based on the common bean mixed with pieces of bacon and either molasses or maple syrup that is then slow cooked in the oven. Sometimes other ingredients are added. Fèves au lard are usually served as a side during breakfast, but they can also be served as a side during lunch or supper and they can be served as a meal. Fèves au lard is a traditional dish presented at sugar shacks during le temps des sucres in Québec and other French-speaking regions of Canada.

This dish was inspired by cultural exchanges between Québécois and New Englanders during the 19th century. It is believed that Boston baked beans directly inspired Fèves au lard. It is also thought that this popular recipe, which uses small white beans, was what caused the gourgane bean to fall out of favour in Québec.

== Bineries ==
Some establishments call themselves "Bineries" because they consider Fèves au lard and other baked bean dishes a specialty of theirs. An example of this is La Binerie Mont-Royal, a restaurant in Montréal.

== Gallery ==
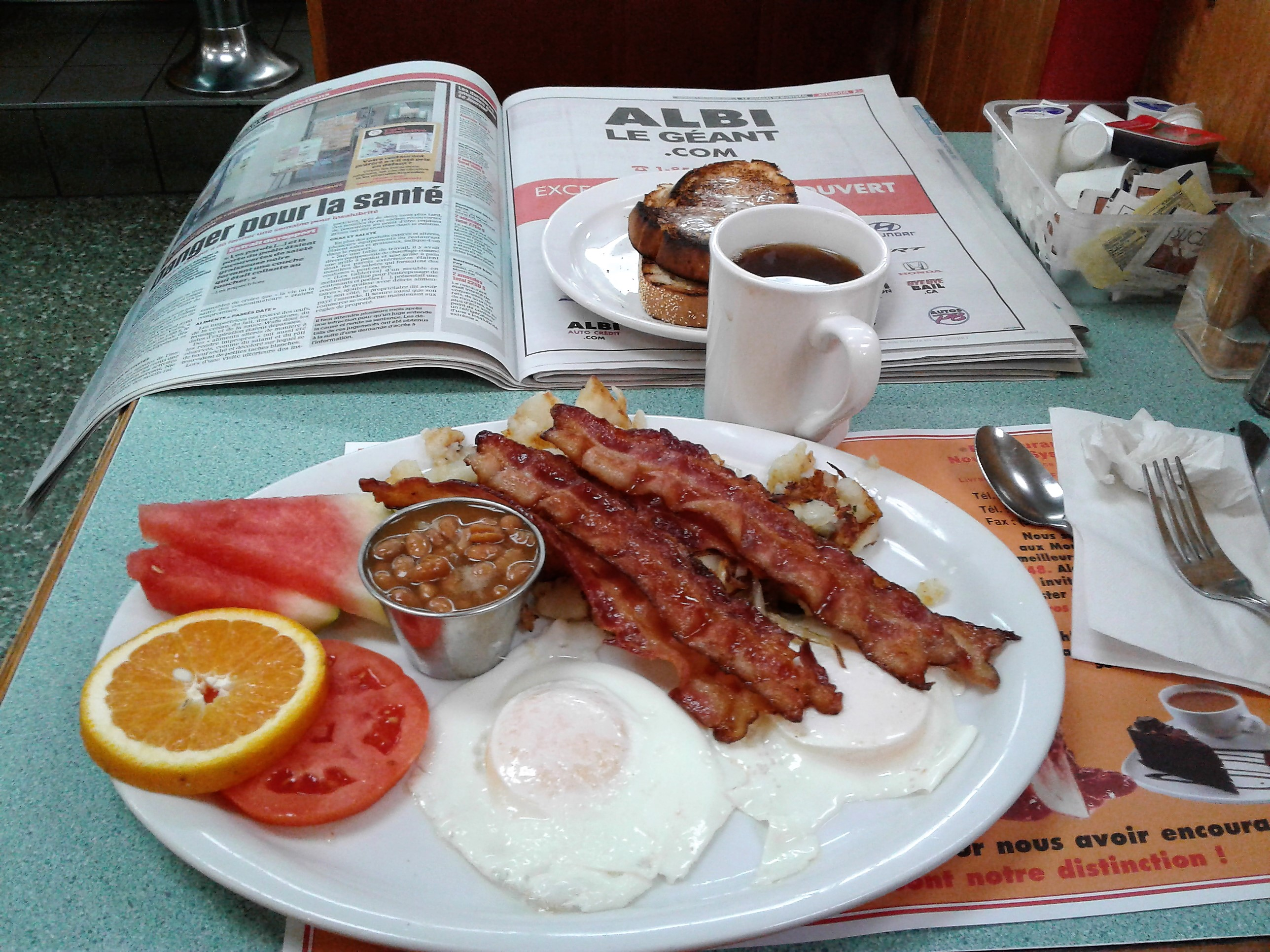
A typical Québécois breakfast, featuring a small pot of fèves au lard as a side.

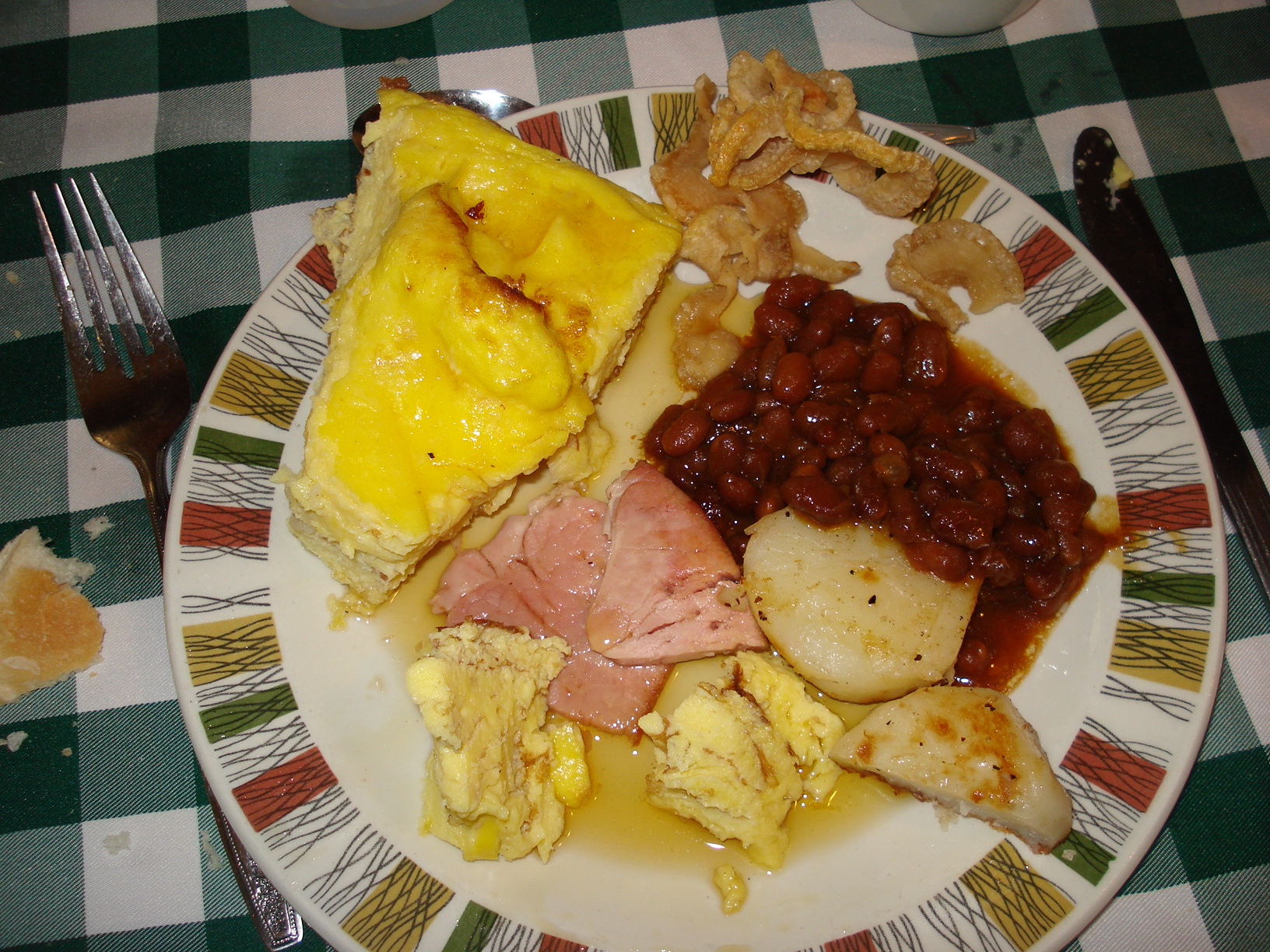
Breakfast at a sugar shack, featuring fève au lard, oreilles de crisse, eggs, ham and potatoes.

== See also ==
- Cuisine of Quebec
- Sugar shack
