= Tastes like chicken =

Idiom

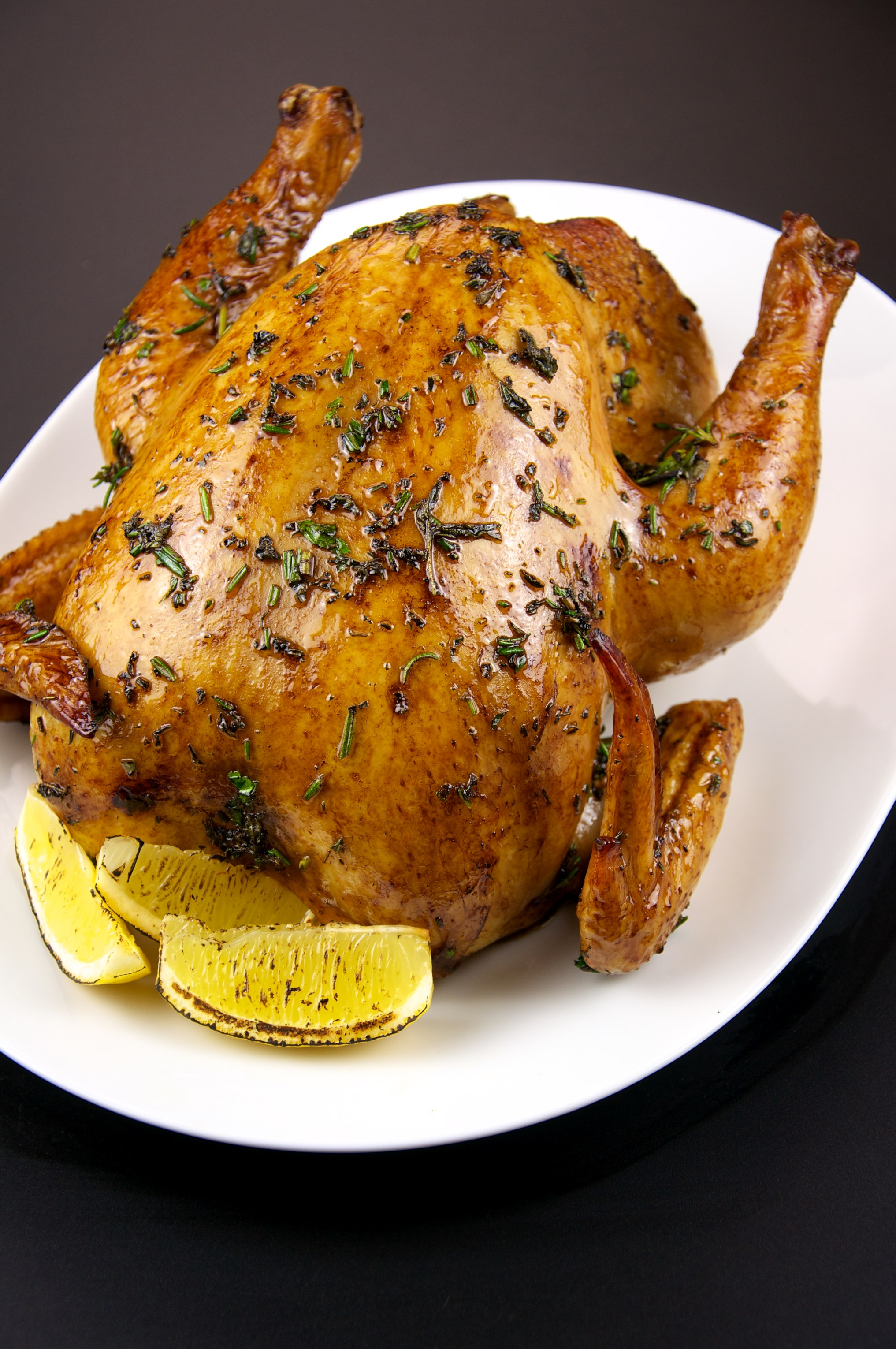
Many meats have a taste similar to chicken.

"Tastes like chicken" is a declaration occasionally used when trying to describe the flavor of an unusual food. The expression has been used so often in popular culture that it has become a cliché. As a result, the phrase is also sometimes used to provide incongruous humor, by being used to describe foods or situations where it has no real relevance.

It has been earnestly used to describe several meats, mostly other poultry meats, but also some other meats, including alligator, frog, and snake.

== Possible explanations ==
As an explanation of why unusual meats would taste more like chicken than common alternatives such as beef or pork, different possibilities have been offered. One idea is that chicken is seen as having a more neutral taste compared to other meats because fat contributes more flavor than muscle (especially in the case of a lean cut such as a skinless chicken breast), making it a generic choice for comparison. Modern poultry, particularly mass-produced chicken and turkey, is considered to be "default", as chicken is the world's most consumed meat and animals are bred for large muscle mass that grows faster than naturally breeding fowl; trace chemicals in the meat that would give it a distinctive flavor would thus be dispersed through larger amounts of muscle with less time to accumulate, thus giving lower concentrations per ounce of meat and creating a more generic taste.

Another suggestion, made by Joe Staton of the Museum of Comparative Zoology, is that meat flavors are fixed based on the "evolutionary origin" of the animal. Specifically, he noted that certain tetrapods, particularly amphibians, reptiles and certain birds, largely taste like chicken, whereas other animals such as mammals and non-tetrapod fish (seafood) usually do not. Mapping reported tastes onto a phylogenetic tree of the tetrapods, it can be hypothesized that the "chicken taste" is an ancestral trait common among the Tetrapoda whereas other tastes (mammals, "beef-like" of ostrich) are derived traits. This would imply that birds (and dinosaurs in general) are more likely to taste more like chicken than like mammal meat. Bird meat that serve as exceptions (or rather hypothesized independent derivations of alternative taste) include: pheasant ("unique"), Canada geese ("the roast beef of the skies"), duck (considered red meat), birds of prey ("different"), and the aforementioned ostrich. (The extent of divergence from chicken-taste in sea fishes is not consistent; tuna was said to taste enough like chicken that a prominent tuna canner named its product Chicken of the Sea.)

Another possibility is that since much of the meat of a chicken is taken from the chest, which contains the white 'fast fibers' that are necessary for the short, fast flight of a fleeing chicken, it tastes like these other animals due to similar concentrations of fast fibers in the parts that are used for meat. The taste difference is usually attributed to low concentrations of the iron-containing protein myoglobin, a high concentration being more typical of vertebrates and tissues adapted for slow, sustained exertion. Myoglobin-rich meat is often called red meat.
