= Tenderoni =

Stovetop macaroni product

1950s advertising for Tenderoni

Tenderoni is an easy-to-make stovetop macaroni product trademarked and produced by the Stokely Van Camp Food Company. Since its withdrawal from the US market, the name has evolved into an urban slang term for a younger love interest of either gender, or someone too young to talk to or become involved with.

== Food product ==
The term Tenderoni was originally coined and trademarked in the 1930s by the Stokely Van Camp Food Company. The new pasta entered the pasta market as "Van Camp's Tenderoni." Tenderoni is a narrow, thin-walled, hollow piece of straight macaroni. The product was named Tenderoni because it cooked quickly, was "tender" enough without being starchy, and was considered a macaroni product. Tenderoni was particularly popular in post-war America during the 1940s and 1950s because the product was made from fortified wheat flour and was enjoyed by children. It was also inexpensive to make and sell.

Tenderoni remained in production through the 1970s until it was withdrawn from the market in 1981; the current trademark rights have been owned since 2004 by 200 Kelsey Associates, LLC of New Rochelle, New York.

== Slang term ==
Cassell's Dictionary of Slang, which defines tenderoni as "a sweet young girl," dates the word to the 1980s, attributing it to African-American teenagers in the United States. The word gained renewed attention when Bobby Brown used it in his 1988 hit "Roni" to describe a young beautiful girl (Only tenderonis can give you special love / A special kind of love that makes you feel good inside ... And if you find a Tenderoni that is right for you / Make it official / Give her your love / My heart belongs to my 'Roni'"), but it had also previously been used, in 1982, in the Michael Jackson song "P.Y.T. (Pretty Young Thing)" ("Tenderoni you've got to be / Spark my nature / Sugar fly with me")

== Appearances in popular culture ==
=== In popular music ===
- Akon, "Yali Nassini ft. Melissa" (2009)
- Big Daddy Kane, "I Get The Job Done" (1989)
- Bobby Brown, "Roni" (1988)
- Tevin Campbell, "Can We Talk" (1993)
- Chromeo, "Tenderoni" (2007)
- Destiny's Child, "Hey Ladies" (1999)
- Grand Puba (Brand Nubian), "One for All" (1990)
- Ill Al Skratch featuring Brian McKnight, "I'll Take Her" (1994)
- Leon Haywood, "Tenderoni" (1984)
- J-Live, "Like This Anna" (2002)
- Michael Jackson, "P.Y.T. (Pretty Young Thing)" (1982)
- Jaheim, "What You Think of That" (2008)
- KP & Envyi, "Swing My Way" (1997)
- Kele Okereke, "Tenderoni" (2010)
- Eddie Kendricks, "Sweet Tenderoni" (1976)
- Lil Wayne, "Da Da Da" (2009)
- Little Brother, "Too Late for Us" (2008)
- LaToya London, "Non A What'cha Do" (2005)
- Lost Boyz, "Renee" (1995)
- MC Magic, "Tenderoni" (2009)
- Marky Mark and the Funky Bunch, "Make Me Say Ooh!" (1991)
- Method Man, "Break Ups 2 Make Ups" (1998)
- O'Bryan, "Tenderoni" (1986)
- The O'Jays, "She's Only a Woman" (1975)
- Pete Rock & CL Smooth, "All the Places" (1994)
- Pleasure P, "Tenderoni" (2009)
- Quasimoto, "Real Eyes" (2000)
- T-Pain, "I'm Sprung", "I'm Sprung 2" Ft. Trick Daddy (2005)
- Tim Dog, "I Get Wrecked" (1993)
- Tyler, the Creator, “Pothole” (2017)
- Vanilla Ice, "Havin' A Roni" (1991)
- Kanye West, "The Cleveland Show Rap Battle Feat. Kanye West " (2010)
- Wayne Wonder, "Nobody But Me" (2003)
- Killa Karisma, "Facebook Pics" (2012)

=== In television ===
- Dog the Bounty Hunter, various episodes
- Glee, Silly Love Songs

== See also ==
- Splackavellie
- Montell Jordan
