= Chicken of the Sea =

American seafood brand

- Type: Subsidiary
- Genre: Seafood
- Founder: Frank Van Camp
- Headquarters: El Segundo, California, U.S.
- Products: Canned, frozen and refrigerated seafood, including tuna
- Owner: Thai Union Group
- Website: chickenofthesea.com

Chicken of the Sea is a packager and provider of seafood, owned by the Thai Union Group in Samut Sakhon, Thailand. The brand is attached to tuna, salmon, clams, crab, shrimp, mackerel, oysters, kippers and sardines in cans, pouches and cups, as are its sister brands, Genova and Ace of Diamonds.

== History ==
The company was founded in the United States when Frank Van Camp's son Gilbert Van Camp moved to San Pedro, Los Angeles, in 1914 and purchased the California Tuna Canning Company, changing the name to the Van Camp Sea Food Company. They adopted the advertising slogan "Chicken of the Sea" in the 1950s. The phrase "Chicken of the Sea", first devised as a way to describe the taste, was so successful that soon it also became the company name.

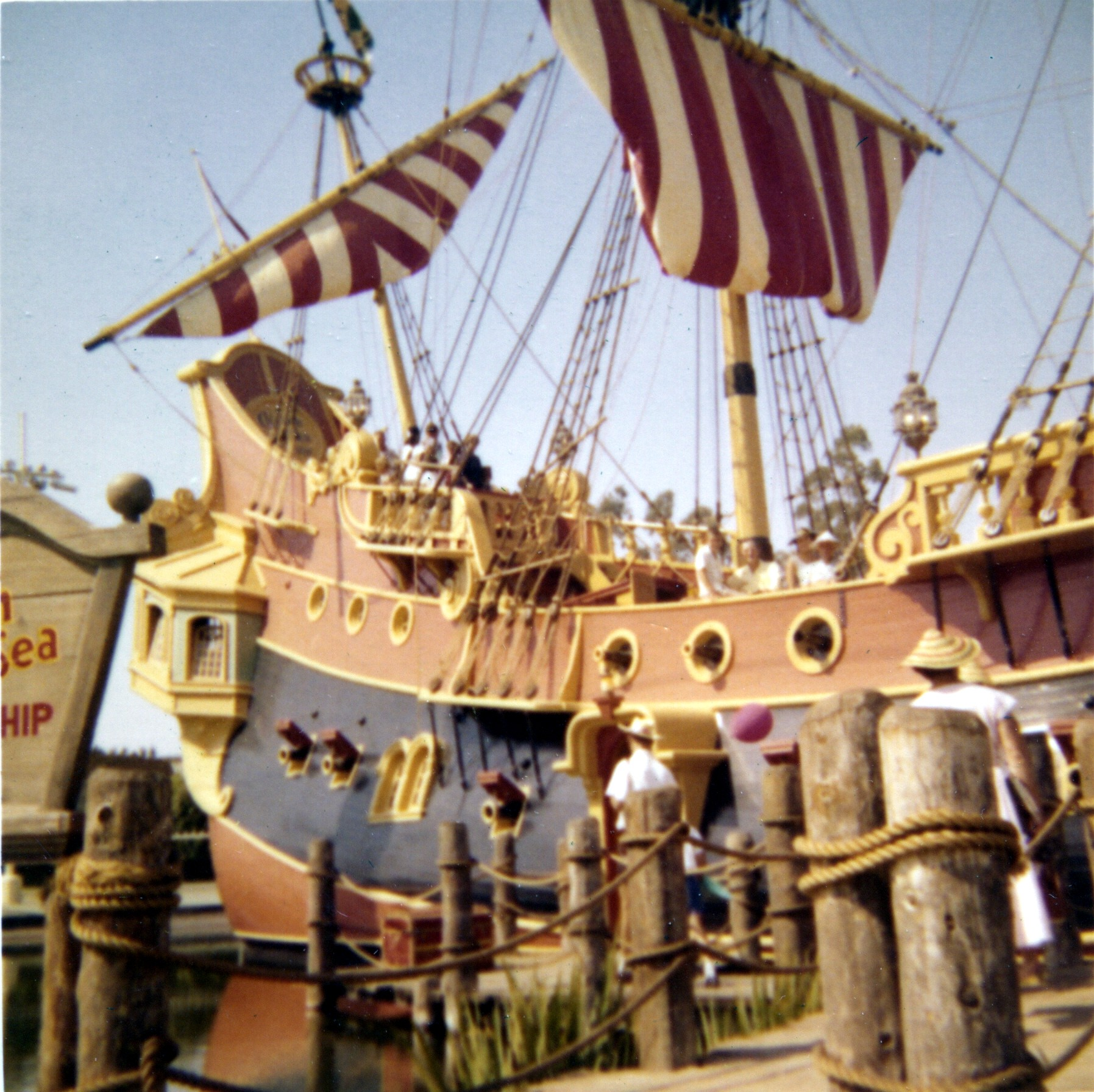
Chicken of the Sea sponsored a restaurant on a pirate ship at Disneyland from 1955 until 1969.

In 1963, Van Camp Seafood Company was purchased by Ralston Purina. In 1988, Ralston sold its Van Camp division to an Indonesian corporation, PT Mantrust (headed by Teguh Sutantyo), which had financial problems, and the primary creditor, Prudential Life Insurance Company, became the majority owner.

In 1997, the company was purchased by the investment group Tri-Union Seafoods LLC, made up of three partners:

1. Thai Union International Inc., a Thai conglomerate based in Bangkok and the then-largest tuna packer in Asia and second largest in the world
2. Edmund A. Gann, American owner of Caribbean Marine Service, Co., Inc., a tuna-fishing fleet
3. Tri-Marine International, Inc., a global trading company formed in Singapore in 1972 dealing in tuna and tuna products headed by Renato Curto, president and majority shareholder.

The new owners changed the name of Van Camp Seafood Company to Chicken of the Sea International. In 2000, Tri-Marine International Inc and Edmund A. Gann sold their 50 percent interest in Chicken of the Sea to Thai Union International, Inc., leaving Thai Union the sole owner of the company. Chicken of the Sea International and Tri-Union International LLC merged into one company, still called Chicken of the Sea International.

With the 2003 acquisition of Empress International, an importer of frozen shrimp and other shellfish, Chicken of the Sea's total annual sales climbed to US$600 million. In 2006, Thai Union formed a new division, Chicken of the Sea Frozen Foods, to focus on sales of premium quality fresh and frozen seafood products. This division grew quickly, enhancing Chicken of the Sea's brand awareness and distribution in the food service and retail industries.

In August 2015, Olean Wholesale Grocery, a regional cooperative of supermarkets in upstate New York, sued Chicken of the Sea and both of its competitors, Bumble Bee Foods and StarKist, accusing the three of colluding to fix prices. Chicken of the Sea was in talks to merge with Bumble Bee at the time, but it was called off on 3 December 2015 after the US Justice Department expressed "serious concerns" stemming from the Olean Wholesale lawsuit.

In 2016, Chicken of the Sea recalled 107,000 cans of tuna in the US due to undercooking because of an equipment malfunction at an undisclosed factory.

In May 2018, the company moved its headquarters from San Diego to El Segundo, California.

== Product name ==
The company's official explanation for the name of their product is that, in the "old days", fishermen referred to white albacore tuna as "chicken of the sea". It was so called because of the white color of its flesh and mild flavor reminded them of chicken. The founder of the company thought it would be a unique name for a brand of tuna.

Their advertising mascot, Catalina, a blonde mermaid with a golden scepter, was introduced in the 1950s and soon became a familiar product icon. In her book The Longest Trek: My Tour of the Galaxy, Grace Lee Whitney is credited as being the original Chicken of the Sea Mermaid. One of the photographs in the book documents this.
