= Dish (food) =

Preparation of a specific food, ready to be served

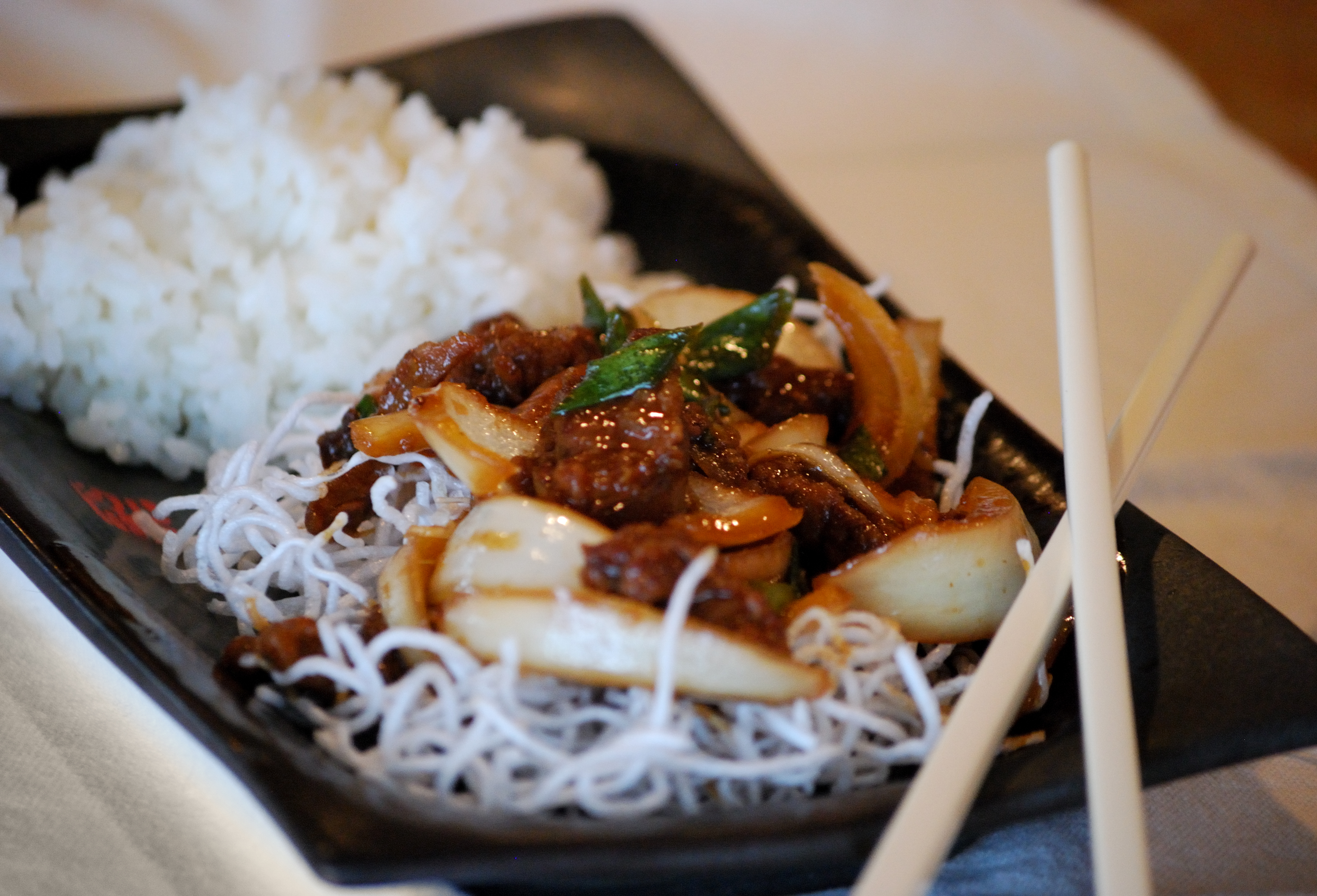
A plate of Mongolian beef

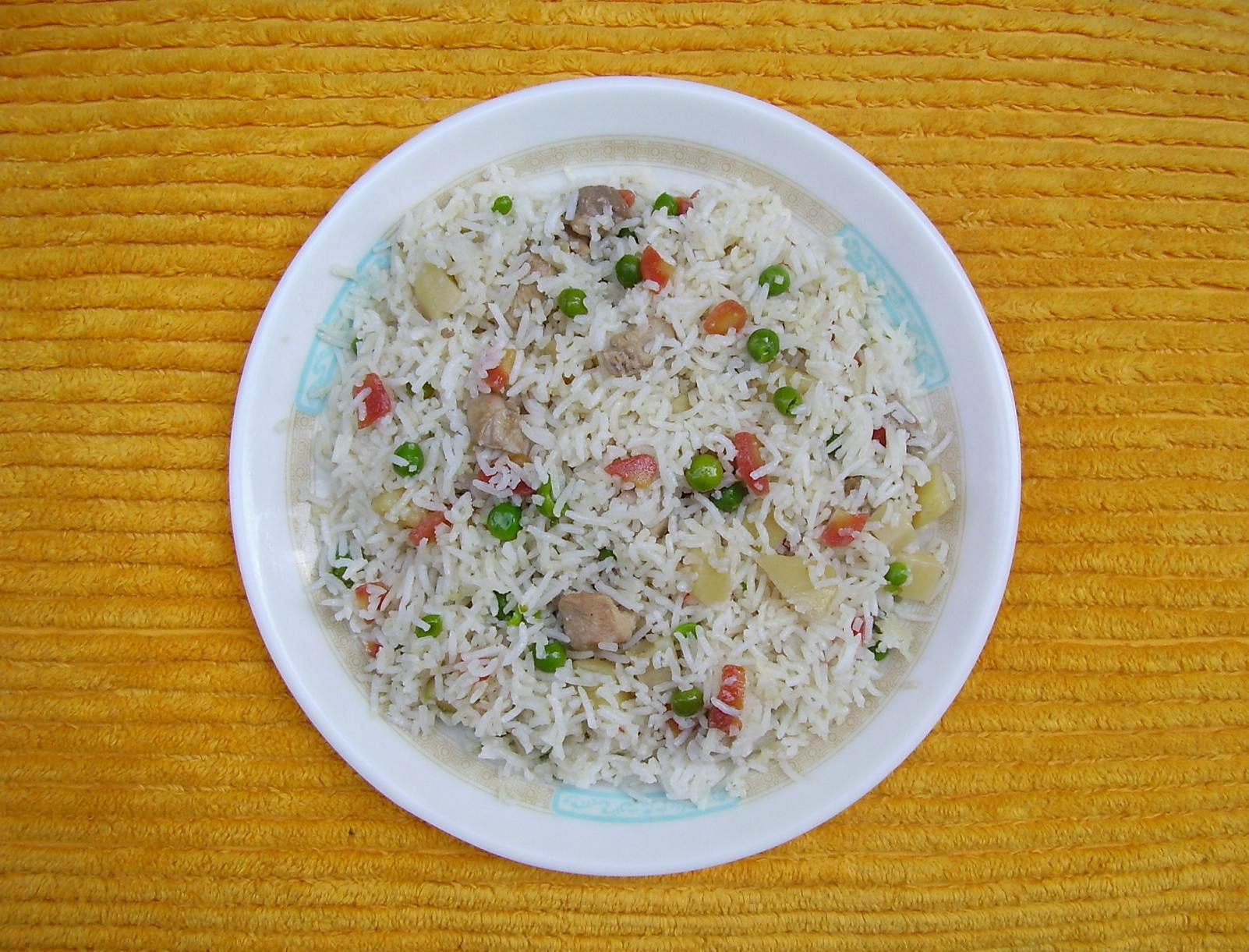
Chinese fried rice served on a plate

A dish in gastronomy is a specific food preparation, a "distinct article or variety of food", ready to eat or to be served.

A dish may be served on dishes or tableware, or may be eaten in one's hands.

Instructions for preparing a dish, including the ingredients, are recipes.

Some dishes, for example a hot dog with ketchup, rarely have their own recipes printed in cookbooks as they are made by combining two foods.

A meal includes one or more dishes, served all at once or in courses.

== Naming ==
Many dishes have specific names, such as Sauerbraten, while others have descriptive names, such as "broiled ribsteak". Many are named for particular places, sometimes because of a specific association with that place, such as Boston baked beans or bistecca alla fiorentina.

In French haute cuisine, many combinations of a base ingredient, a sauce, and a garnish have individual names catalogued in reference works such as Le Répertoire de la cuisine, with naming conventions such as "Florentine" meaning "made with spinach" and not necessarily from Florence.

Some are named for particular individuals:

- To honor them: for example, Brillat-Savarin cheese, named for the 18th-century French gourmet and political figure Jean Anthelme Brillat-Savarin;
- After the first person for whom the dish was prepared: for example, Chaliapin steak, made by the order of the Russian opera singer Feodor Ivanovich Chaliapin in 1934 in Japan;
- After the inventor, either being given the name by that person or because the dish was created in the inventor's kitchen.

Many stories about the creation of dishes are apocryphal.

== See also ==
- Entrée – dish served before the main course
- Food presentation – art of modifying, processing, arranging, or decorating food to enhance its aesthetic appeal
- Garnish – decoration added to food or drink
