= Salt pork =

Salt-cured pork usually made from pork belly

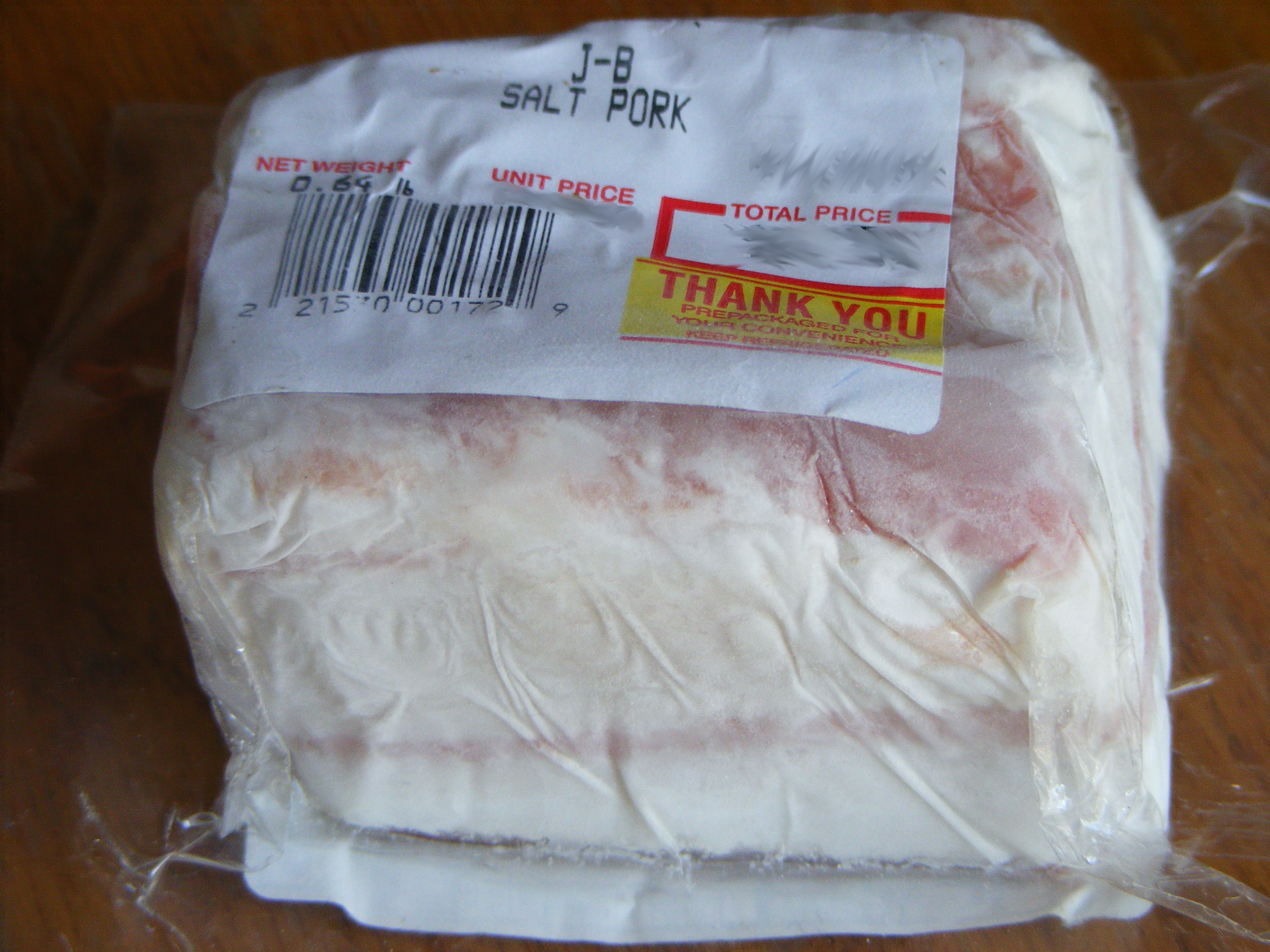
Frozen salt pork

Salt pork is salt-cured pork. It is usually prepared from pork belly, or, less commonly, fatback. Salt pork typically resembles uncut side bacon, but is fattier, being made from the lowest part of the belly, and saltier, as the cure is stronger and performed for longer, and never smoked. The fat on the meat is necessary for the curing process as it allows the salt to soak in and preserve the meat. Salt pork is made by layering salt and thin layers of meat, then dousing it in a brine mixture once the desired size has been reached.

Along with hardtack and corned beef, salt pork was a standard ration for many militaries and navies throughout the 17th, 18th, and 19th centuries, seeing usage in the American Civil War, War of 1812, and the Napoleonic Wars, among others. Salt pork now finds use in traditional American cuisine, particularly Boston baked beans, pork and beans, and to add its flavor to vegetables cooked in water, as with greens in soul food. It is also central to the flavoring of clam chowder. It is generally cut and cooked (blanched or rendered) before use.

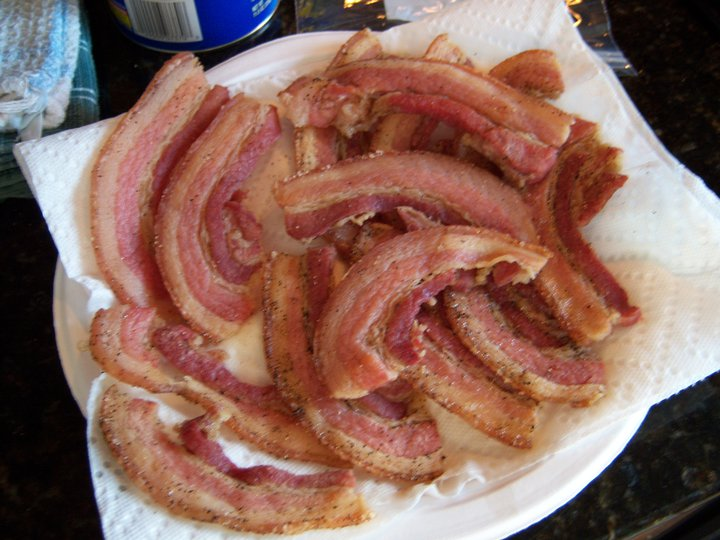
Cooked salt pork with a "streak o' lean"

Salt pork that contains a significant amount of meat, resembling standard side bacon, is known as "streak o' lean." It is traditionally popular in the Southeastern United States. As a stand-alone food product, it is typically boiled to remove much of the salt content and to partially cook the product, then fried until it starts to develop a crisp exterior. It may be eaten as one would eat bacon or used to season other dishes like traditional salt pork.

== See also ==
- Jerky – Lean meat dried to prevent spoilage
- Lardon – Small cubes of fatty pork, possibly cured
- Pancetta – Italian bacon made of pork belly meat
- Petit Salé – Salted pork
- Salo – Eastern European traditional cured pork
- Tocino – Crunchy strips of skin and bacon cut from pork loin
