= Boston baked beans =

American dish with cultural origin around Boston

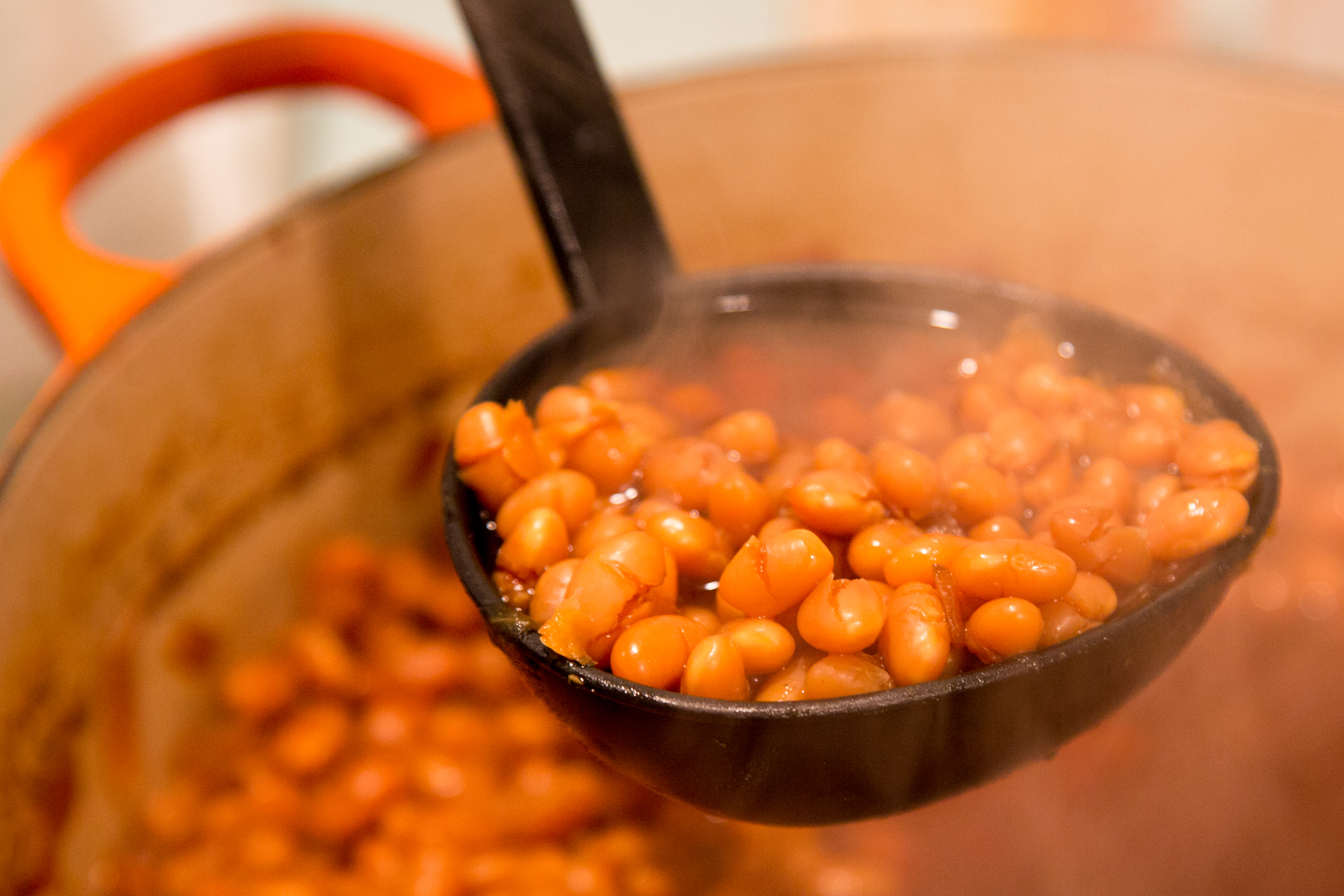
- Course: Main
- Region or state: New England
- Associated cuisine: New England
- Serving temperature: Hot
- Main ingredients: Navy beans
- Ingredients generally used: Molasses; Salt pork or bacon
- Variations: Maine baked beans

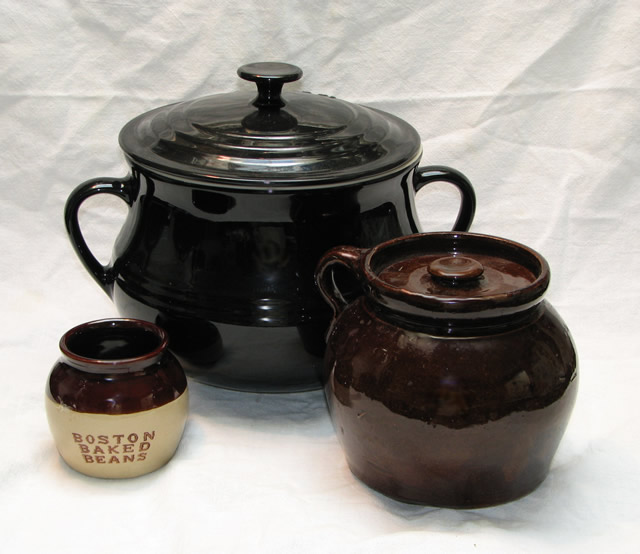
An assortment of crockery in which beans are baked, including a souvenir-style Boston Baked Beans beanpot

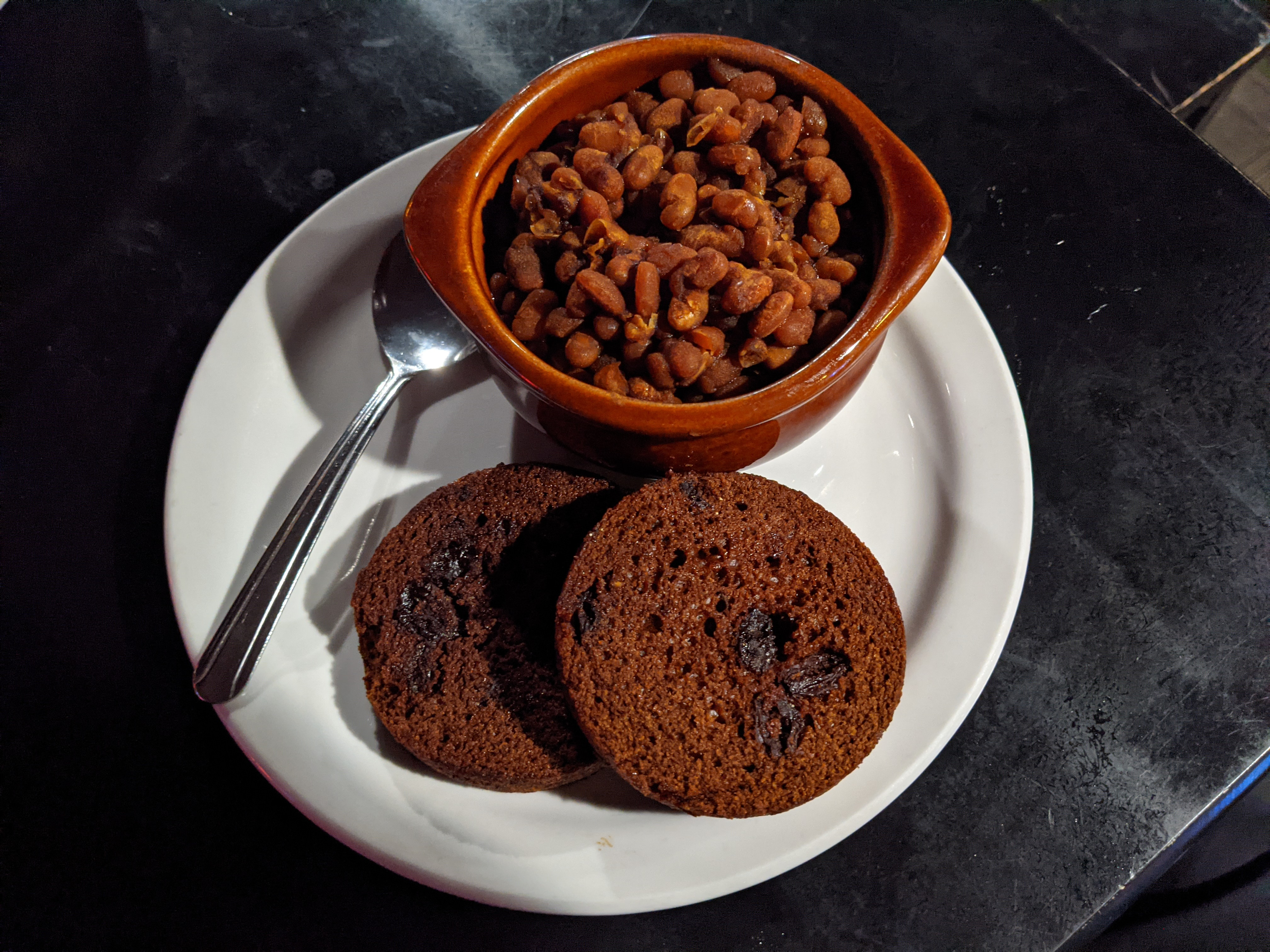
Baked beans served with Boston brown bread

Boston baked beans are a variety of baked beans, sweetened with molasses, and flavored with salt pork or bacon.

== History ==
The Pilgrims at Plymouth Colony brought recipes for bean and bacon pottage in the early 1620s which was made with honey and mustard cured ham and onions. The triangular trade in the 18th century helped to make Boston an exporter of rum, which is produced by the distillation of fermented molasses. The introduction of now-widely available molasses to baked beans created a distinctive style of baked beans unique to New England.

In colonial New England, baked beans were traditionally cooked on Saturdays and left in brick ovens overnight. On Sundays, the beans were still hot, allowing people to indulge in a hot meal and still comply with Sabbath restrictions. Brown bread and baked beans along with frankfurters continue to be a popular Saturday night staple throughout the region.

== Regional varieties ==
The region has two main styles of baked beans: Boston baked beans and Maine baked beans. The difference between the two styles is that Boston beans are made with small white navy beans or pea beans with thin skin while Maine beans are made with native bean varieties with thicker skins. The varieties used in Maine are Marafax, soldier, and yellow-eye, with yellow-eye being the most popular variety.

Both varieties are often made with salt pork or bacon. However, there is also a long tradition of vegetarian baked beans made with the same recipe as Boston baked beans or Maine baked beans but made without the addition of salt pork or bacon.

== Legacy ==
Boston is often referred to as “Beantown” in reference to the popular dish. From 1883 to 1906 the National League baseball team in Boston was known as the Boston Beaneaters. An annual tournament between the ice hockey teams of four Boston-area universities is named the Beanpot.

This dish is thought to have inspired the common Quebec dish Fèves au lard.

== See also ==
- List of regional dishes of the United States
- Original Boston Baked Beans, a candy by the Ferrara Candy Company
- Sabbath stew, a similar Jewish tradition of stews prepared by slow cooking to avoid working on the Sabbath
