= Baked beans =

Cooked beans in a seasoned sauce

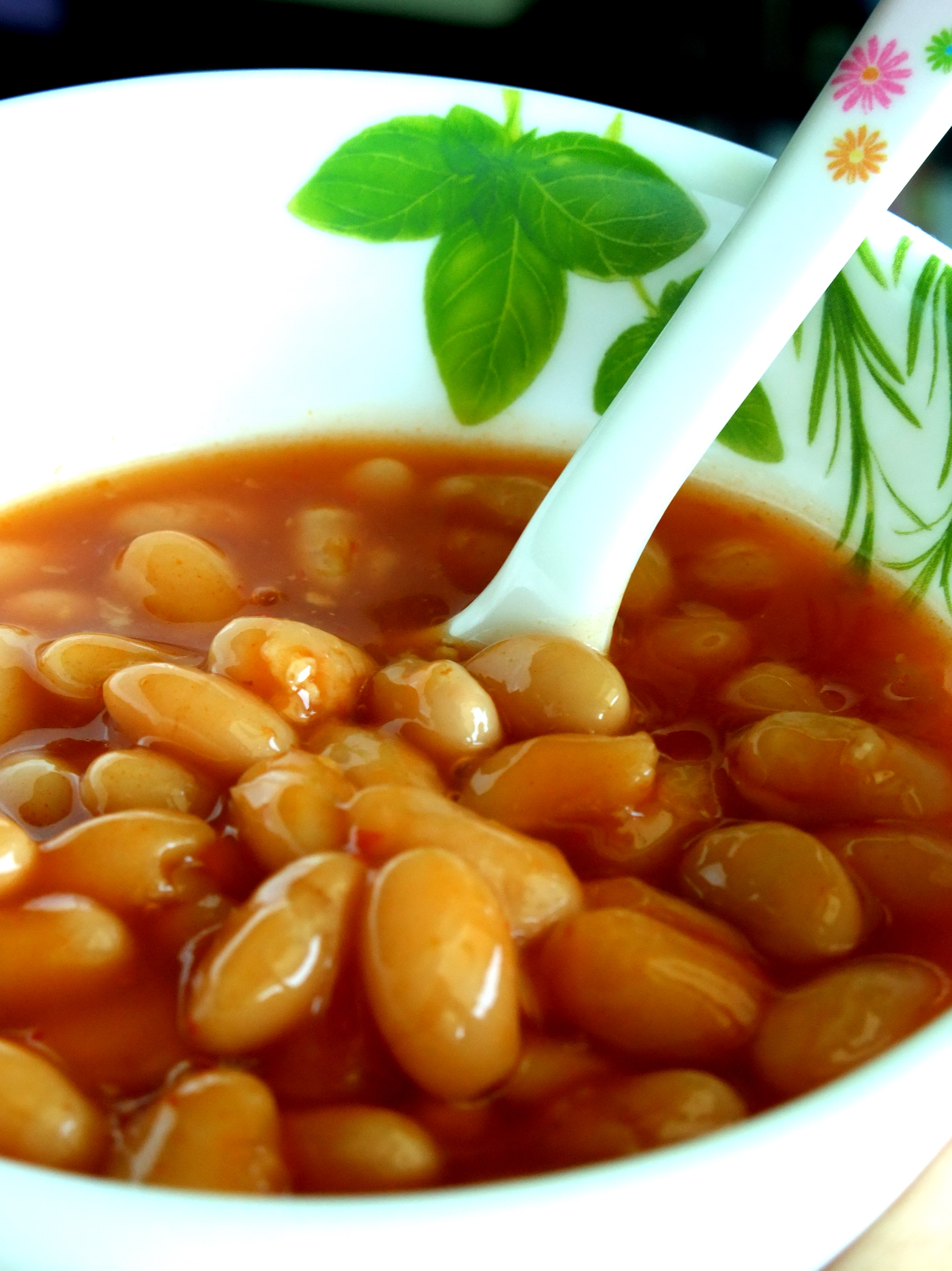
- Baked beans in tomato sauce
- Region or state: Various
- Serving temperature: Heated or room temperature
- Main ingredients: White common beans (usually navy beans)
- Similar dishes: Fèves au lard, refried beans

Baked beans are a dish traditionally containing white common beans that are parboiled and then baked in sauce at low temperature for a lengthy period. Canned baked beans are not baked, but are cooked through a steam process.

Canned baked beans are commonly made using navy beans (known as haricot beans in the UK), which originated in Peru. In New England, various indigenous legumes are also used, such as Jacob's cattle, soldier beans and yellow-eyed beans.

Beans in a brown sugar, sugar, or corn syrup sauce (with or without tomatoes) are widely available in many countries. Kraft Heinz is the largest manufacturer of canned baked beans in Europe, while Bush Brothers is the largest producer in the United States.

Canned baked beans are used as a convenience food. Traditionally served hot, they may be eaten hot or cold, and straight from the can, as they are fully cooked. Heinz began producing canned baked beans in 1886. In the early 20th century, canned baked beans gained more widespread use, particularly in the United Kingdom, where they are commonly served in a full breakfast.

== Origin ==
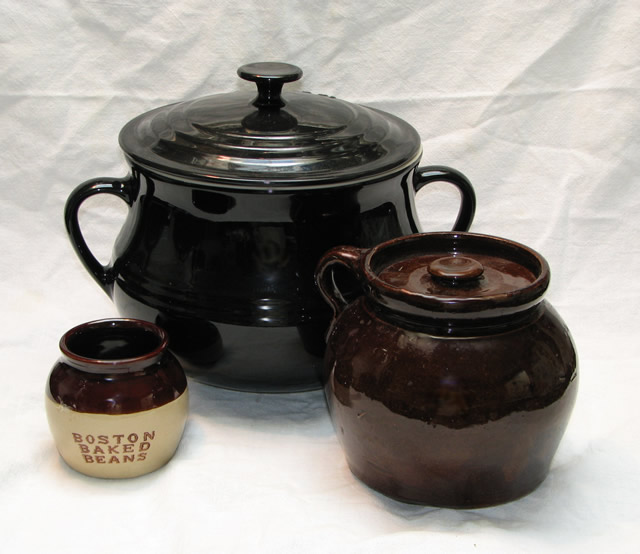
Three beanpots used for cooking homemade baked beans. The small one is glazed with the letters "Boston Baked Beans"

The origins of baked beans are traced to the indigenous peoples of the Americas, who began preparing beans using the method of soaking and baking them during ancient history. Evidence of preparing beans in this manner dates back to c. 1500 BC in the Maya civilization.

In the northeast of America various Native American peoples, including the Haudenosaunee, the Narragansett and the Penobscot, mixed beans, maple sugar, and bear fat in earthenware pots which they placed in pits called "bean holes" which were lined in hot rocks to cook slowly over a long period of time. The bean hole cooking method later became a tradition in Maine that was practiced in logging camps where beans prepared in this way were served as every meal. A fire would be made in a stone-lined pit and allowed to burn down to hot coals, and then a pot with 11 pounds of seasoned beans would be placed in the ashes, covered over with dirt, and left to cook overnight or longer.

British colonists in New England were the first Westerners to introduce their version of the dish to the area, the Native American version was very similar to pease pudding. They substituted molasses or sugar for the maple syrup, bacon or ham for the bear fat, and simmered their beans for hours in pots over the fire instead of underground. Each colony in America had its own regional variations of the dish, with navy or white pea beans used in Massachusetts, Jacob's Cattle and soldier beans used in Maine, and yellow-eyed beans in Vermont. This variation likely resulted from the colonists receiving the dish from different Native peoples who used different native beans.

While some historians have theorized that baked beans had originated from the cassoulet or bean stew tradition in Southern France, this is unlikely as the beans used to make baked beans are all native to North America and were introduced to Europe around 1528. It is possible that English colonists used their knowledge of cassoulet cooking to modify the cooking technique of the beans from the traditional Native American version, by soaking the bean overnight and simmering the beans over a fire before baking it in earthen pots in order to decrease the cooking time. However, this method of soaking and boiling beans was already in practice in the Americas during the Mayan civilization, and was already a known method of preparing beans in the cultures of the first peoples of the Americas prior to European settlement.

A dish similar to baked beans, beans and bacon, was known in medieval England. The addition of onion and mustard to some baked beans recipes published in New England in the 19th century was likely based on traditional 17th century cassoulet recipes from Staffordshire, England, which utilized honey and mustard cured hams, beans, and onions or leeks. These ingredients are still often added to baked beans today. 19th century cookbooks published in New England, spread to other portions of the United States and Canada, which familiarized other people with the dish.

In Turkey, kuru fasulye is a similar white bean stew in a tomato sauce.

=== American origin story ===
The modern recipe for American baked beans originated in the late 19th century as part of an effort to create a story of a national cuisine descended from the time of the Pilgrims, when it was supposedly communicated to them by kindly natives.

Keith Stavely and Kathleen Fitzgerald write that there is no evidence that Native Americans cooked beans using pots or holes in the ground, although it is possible that this method was employed, and so native bean preparation may have been an influence on American baked beans alongside the established English methods the settlers had brought.

== Canned baked beans ==
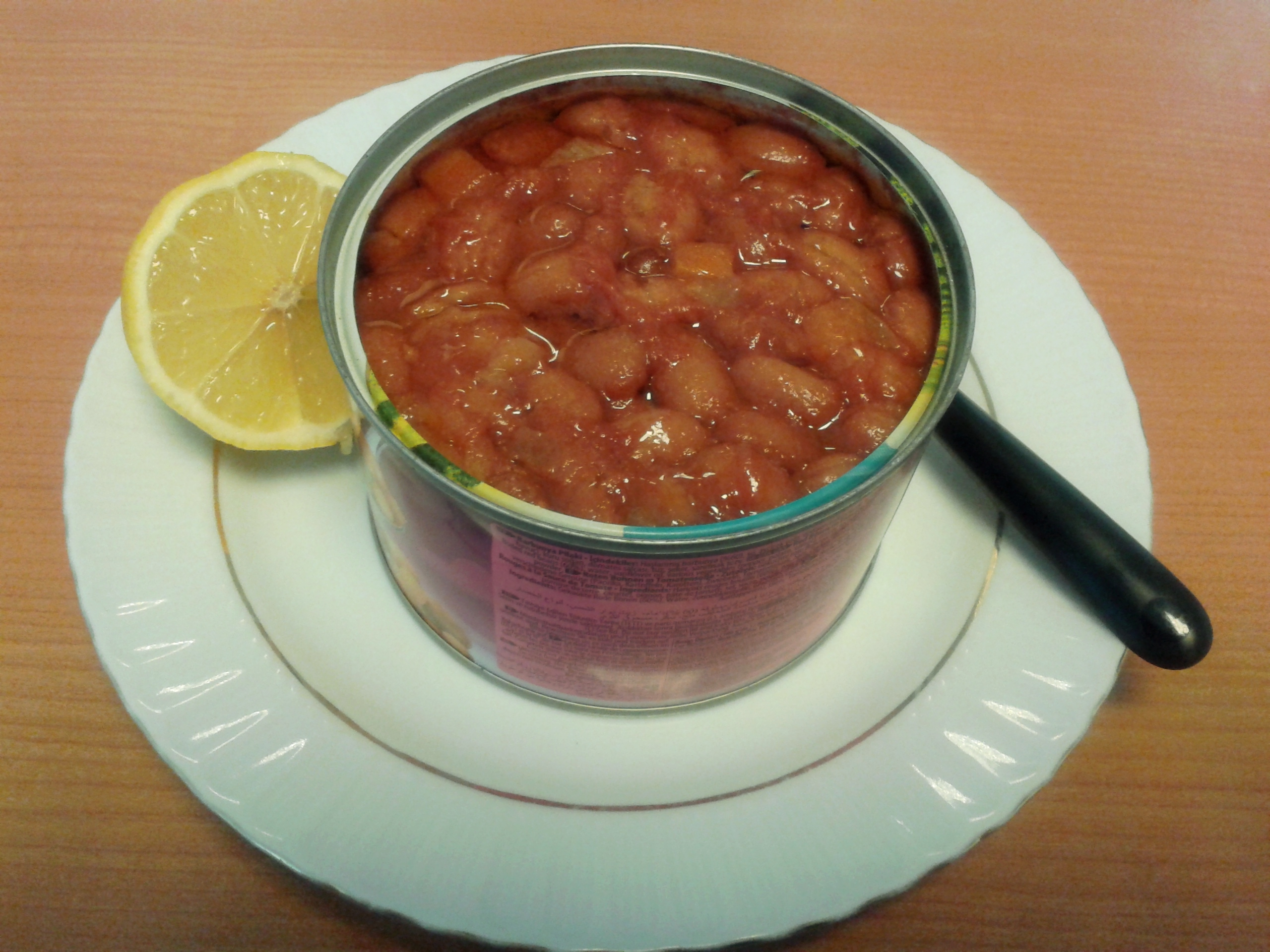
Canned beans

Canned beans, often containing pork, were among the first convenience foods, and were exported and popularized by U.S. companies internationally in the early 20th century. The U.S. Food and Drug Administration (FDA) stated in 1996: "It has for years been recognized by consumers generally that the designation 'beans with pork,' or 'pork and beans' is the common or usual name for an article of commerce that contains very little pork." The included pork is typically a piece of salt pork that adds fat to the dish.

The first mass-produced commercial canning of baked beans in the United States began in 1895 by the Pennsylvania-based H. J. Heinz Company. Heinz was also the first company to sell baked beans outside of the United States, beginning with sales limited solely to Fortnum & Mason in 1886, when the item was considered a luxury. They began selling baked beans throughout the UK in 1901. Heinz produced an advertising campaign in 1927 to encourage more people to eat baked beans. Heinz removed pork from the product during World War II rationing.

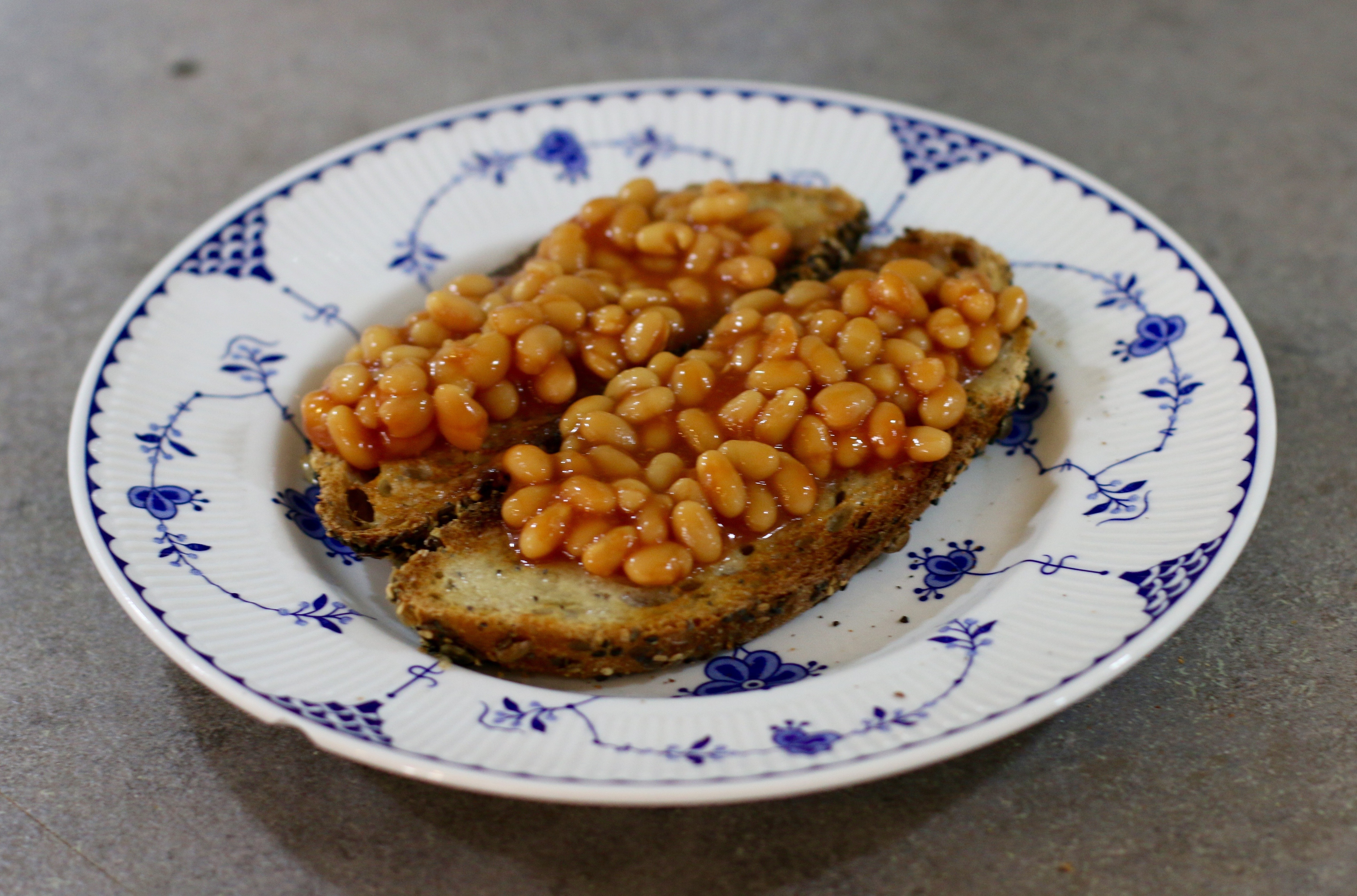
Baked beans on sourdough toast, served in a café in London, England

Originally, Heinz Baked Beans were prepared in the traditional United States manner for sales in Ireland and Great Britain. Over time, the recipe was altered to a less sweet tomato sauce with a mix of herbs and spices but without maple syrup, molasses, or brown sugar to appeal to the tastes of the United Kingdom. This is the version of baked beans most commonly eaten outside of the United States. Baked beans are commonly eaten on toast ("beans on toast") or as part of a full breakfast. Heinz Baked Beans remains the best-selling brand in the UK. The Baked Bean Museum of Excellence in Port Talbot, Wales, was dedicated to baked beans.

== Recipes and use as food ==
Canned baked beans, plain
Nutritional value per 100 g (3.5 oz)
- Energy: 393 kJ (94 kcal)
- Carbohydrates: 21.1 g
- Sugars: 7.96 g
- Dietary fiber: 4.1 g
- Fat: 0.37 g
- Protein: 4.75 g
Vitamins and minerals
| Vitamins | Quantity %DV^{†} |
| Thiamine (B1) | 8% 0.096 mg |
| Riboflavin (B2) | 3% 0.039 mg |
| Niacin (B3) | 3% 0.428 mg |
| Pantothenic acid (B5) | 4% 0.216 mg |
| Vitamin B6 | 5% 0.084 mg |
| Folate (B9) | 3% 12 μg |
| Vitamin C | 0% 0 mg |
| Minerals | Quantity %DV^{†} |
| Calcium | 3% 34 mg |
| Copper | 16% 0.145 mg |
| Iron | 7% 1.19 mg |
| Magnesium | 6% 27 mg |
| Manganese | 5% 0.109 mg |
| Phosphorus | 6% 74 mg |
| Potassium | 7% 224 mg |
| Sodium | 15% 343 mg |
| Zinc | 21% 2.28 mg |
- Other constituents: Quantity
- Water: 72 g
- Link to USDA Database entry
- ^{†}Percentages estimated using US recommendations for adults, except for potassium, which is estimated based on expert recommendation from the National Academies.

While many recipes are commonly stewed, traditionally dried beans were soaked overnight, simmered until tender (parboiled), and then slow-baked in a ceramic or cast-iron beanpot. Originally baked beans were sweetened with maple syrup by Native Americans, a tradition some recipes still follow, but some English colonists modified the sweetening agent to brown sugar beginning in the 17th century. In the 18th century the convention of using American made molasses as a sweetening agent became increasingly used in order to avoid British taxes on sugar. The molasses style of baked beans has become closely associated with the city of Boston and is often referred to as Boston baked beans.

Today in the New England region, baked beans are flavored either with maple syrup (Northern New England), or with molasses (Boston), and are traditionally cooked with salt pork in a beanpot in a masonry oven for six to eight hours. In the absence of a brick oven, the beans were cooked in a beanpot nestled in a bed of embers placed near the outer edges of a hearth, about a foot away from the fire. Today, baked beans can be made in a slow cooker or in a modern oven using a traditional beanpot, casserole dish or Dutch oven. Regardless of cooking method, the results of the dish, commonly described as having a savory-sweet flavor and a brownish- or reddish-tinted white bean, are the same.

While initially a New England regional cuisine, baked beans have become a common item in many countries, and are now a staple item served at barbecues and picnics. They are easily prepared and consumed, and can be served hot or cold directly from the can, making them handy for outdoor eating.

== Nutrition ==
Canned baked beans (plain or vegetarian) are 72% water, 21% carbohydrates, 5% protein, and contain negligible fat (table). In a reference amount of 100 g (3.5 oz), baked beans supply 393 kilojoules (94 kilocalories) of food energy and 4 g (0.14 oz) of dietary fiber. They are a rich source (21% of the Reference Daily Intake) of zinc and a moderate source of copper and sodium, with no other micronutrients in significant content (table).

In 2002 in the UK, manufacturers of canned baked beans were allowed to advertise the product as contributing to the recommended daily consumption of five to six vegetables per person. This concession was criticised by heart specialists, who pointed to the high levels of sugar and salt in the product. Some manufacturers produce a "healthy" version of the product with reduced levels of sugar and salt.

== See also ==
- Baked beans pizza
- "Beans, Beans, the Musical Fruit", a playground saying referring to the capacity for beans to cause increased flatulence
- List of legume dishes
- Refried beans
- Pork and beans
