= List of sauces =

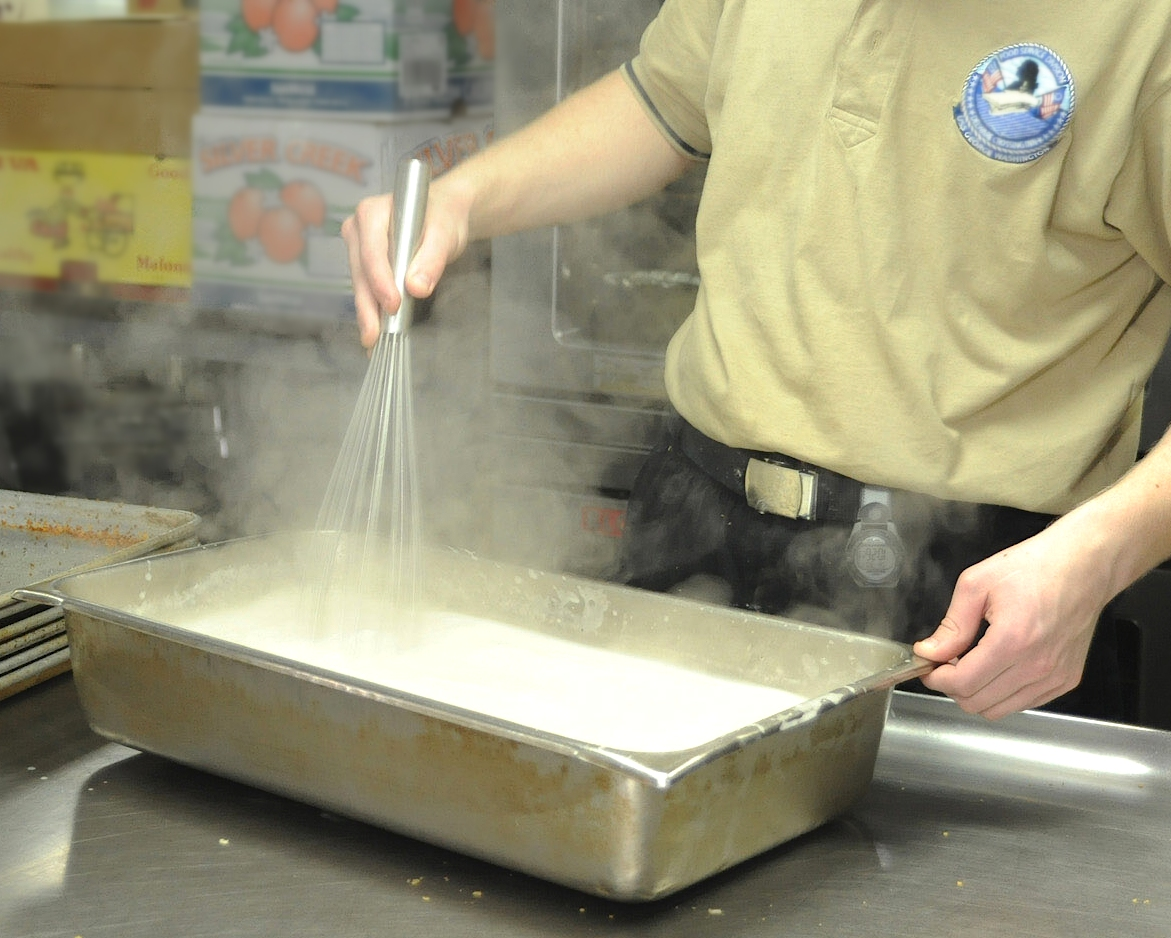
A cook whisking a sauce

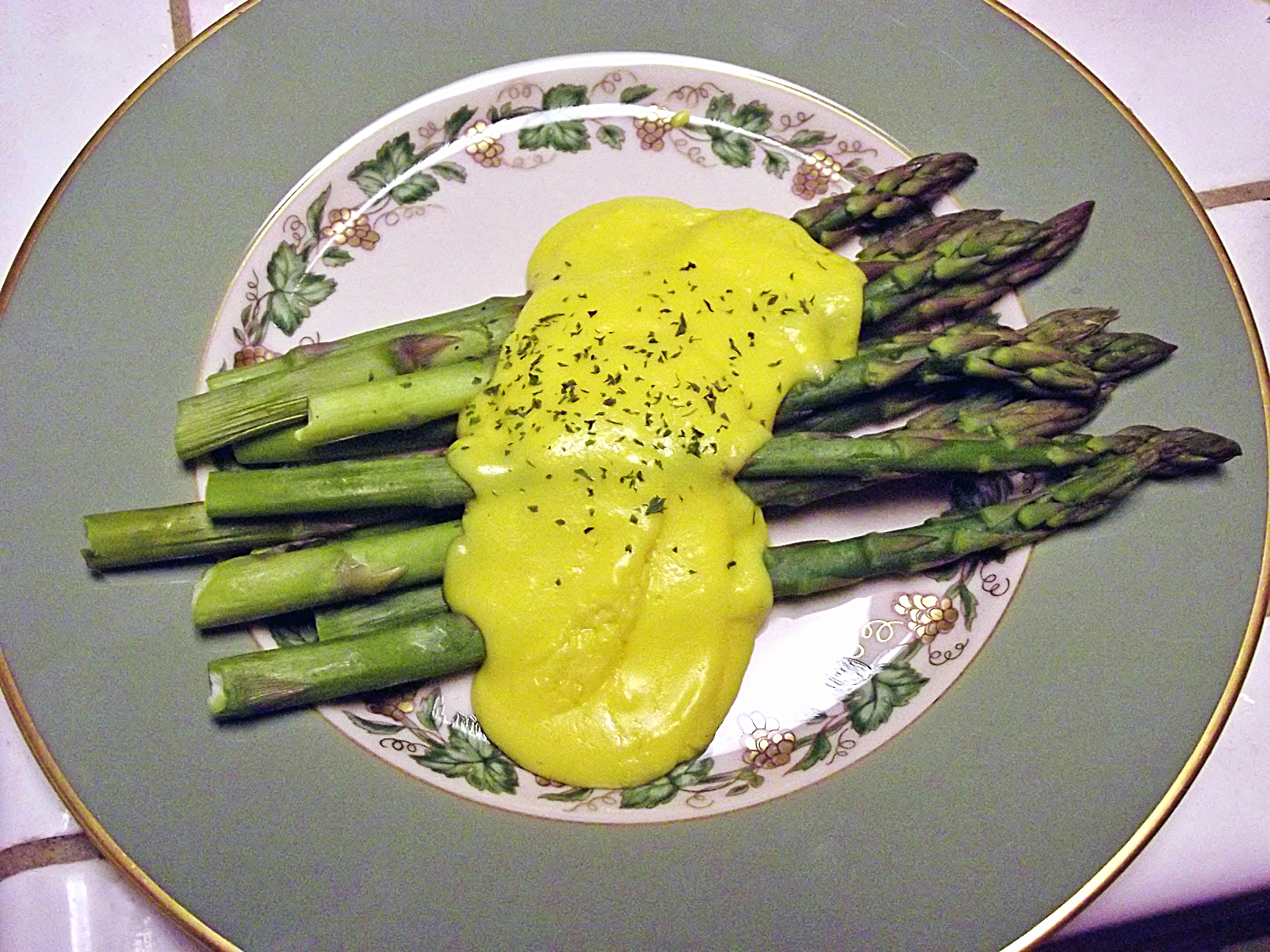
Hollandaise sauce on asparagus

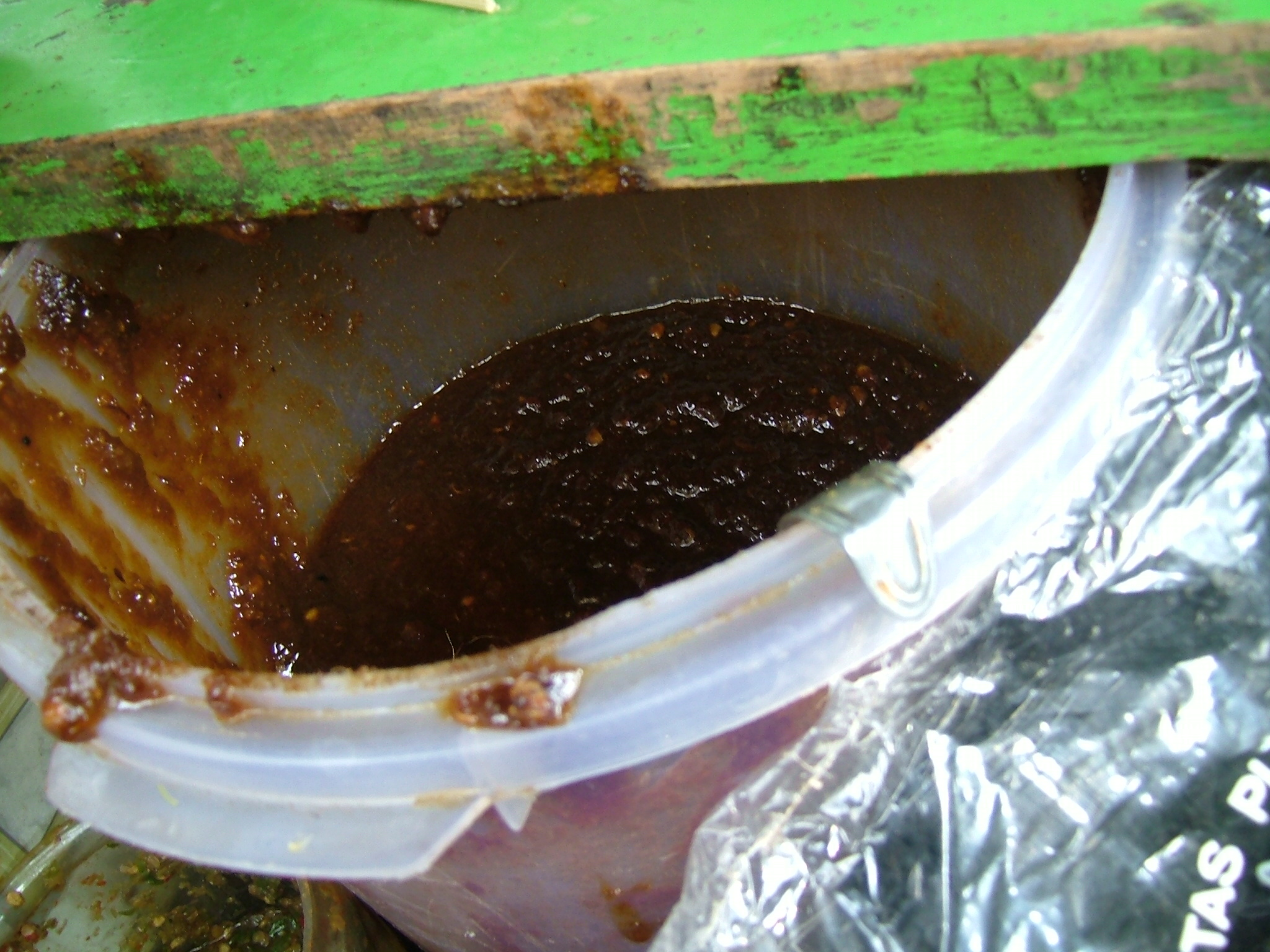
Sweet rujak sauce, made with palm sugar, tamarind, peanuts, and chilli

The following is a list of notable culinary and prepared sauces used in cooking and food service.

== General ==
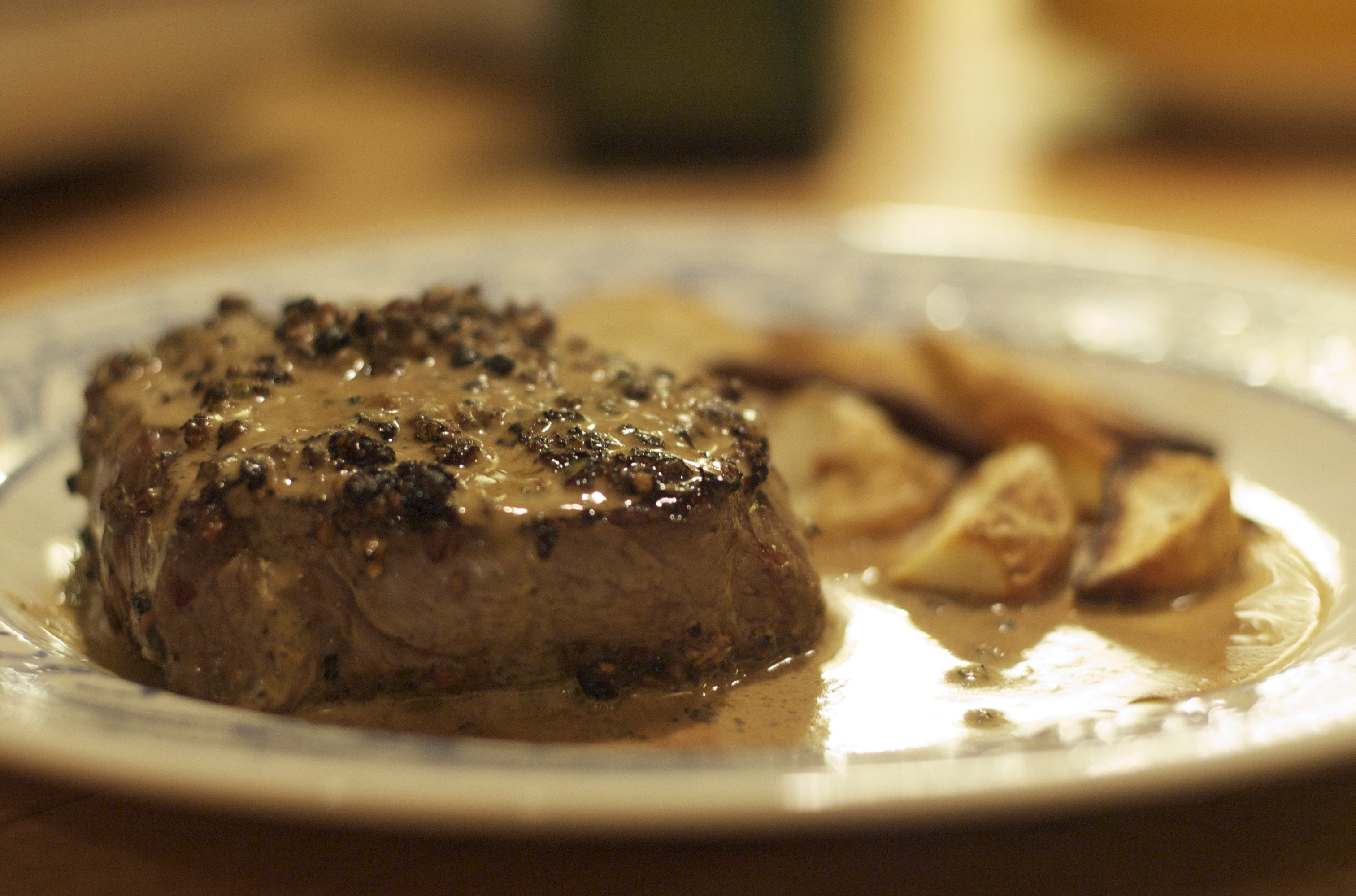
Steak au poivre with a peppercorn sauce

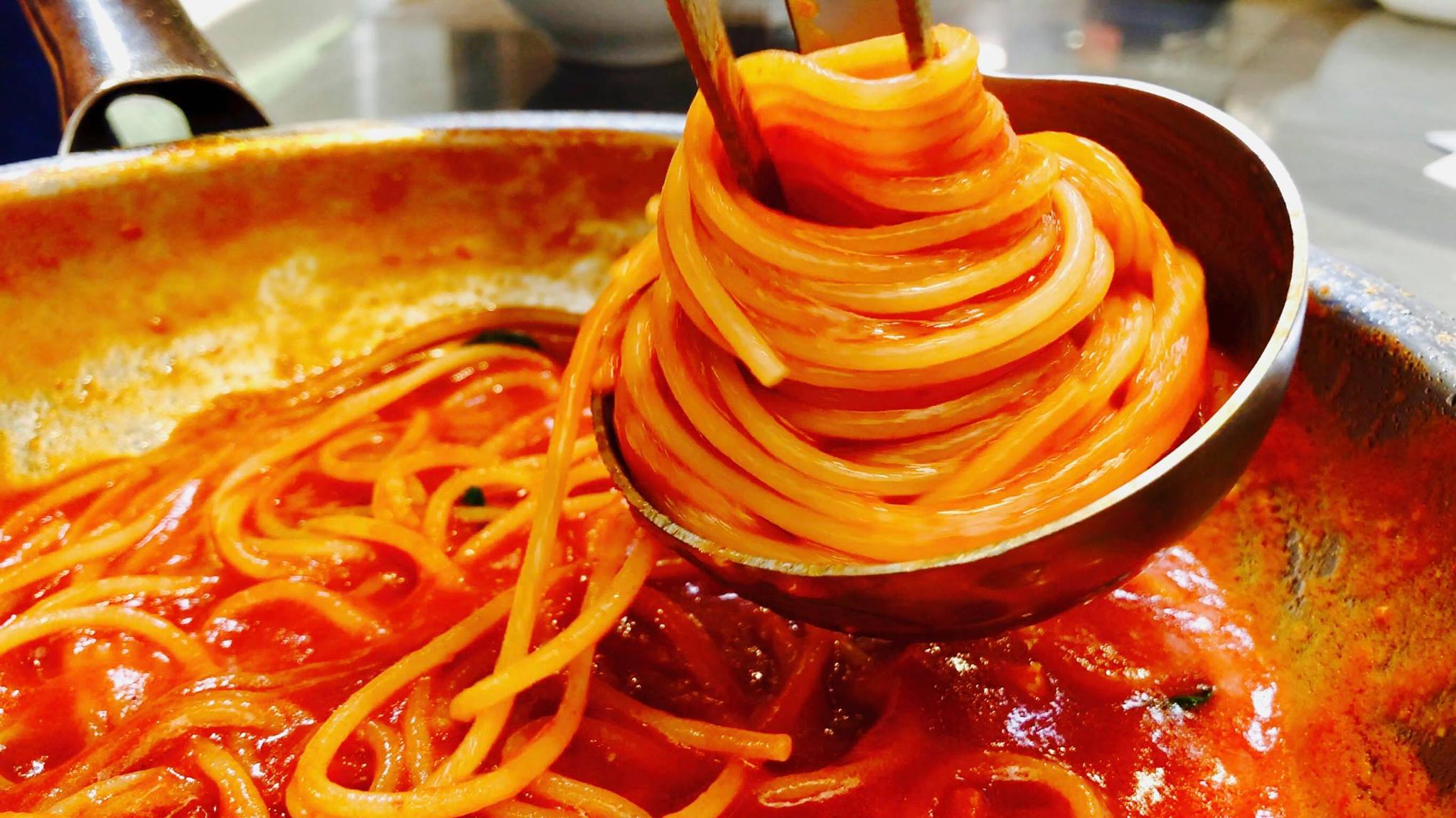
Spaghetti with tomato sauce

- Anchovy essence – Spiced fish sauce
- Avgolemono – Egg-lemon sauce or soup
- Avocado sauce – Sauce prepared using avocado as a primary ingredient
- Barbecue sauce – Sauce used as a marinade, basting, or topping
- Bread sauce – Sauce made with milk and bread crumbs
- Cheese sauce – Sauce made with cheese
- Cocktail sauce – Condiment served usually with seafoods
- Coffee sauce – Culinary sauce that includes coffee
- Corn sauce – Condiment
- Coulis – Thin sauce made from vegetables or fruits
- Duck sauce – Dip for Chinese-style duck dishes
- Egusi sauce – African sauce
- Fry sauce – Condiment for French fries
- Hollandaise sauce – Sauce made of egg, butter, and lemon
- Mahyawa – Iranian cuisine tangy sauce made out of fermented fish
- Mignonette sauce – Condiment served with oysters
- Mint sauce – Sauce made of chopped mint
- Mushroom ketchup – Style of ketchup
- Normande sauce – Culinary sauce – Creamy sauce accompanies with seafood
- Pan sauce – Cooking technique to create a sauce
- Peppercorn sauce – Culinary cream sauce
- Rainbow sauce – Type of culinary sauce
- Ravigote sauce – Classic, lightly acidic sauce in French cuisine
- Romesco – Catalan sauce of tomatoes, garlic, and nuts
- Salad dressing – Food mixture, served chilled or at room temperature
- Salsa – Condiment used in Mexican cuisine (salsa roja)
- Satsebeli – Tomato sauce in Georgian cuisine
- Sauce andalouse – Belgian sauce
- Sauce aurore – a velouté sauce flavored with tomato
- Sauce bercy – French sauce
- Sauce poulette – prepared using mushrooms and lemon
- Sauce vin blanc – Culinary sauce
- Sofrito – Cooked vegetable foundation for cooking
- Steak sauce – Brown sauce for seasoning of steaks
- Sweet chili sauce – Condiment primarily used as a dip
- Tomato sauce – Sauce made primarily from tomatoes
- Vinaigrette – Sauce made from oil and vinegar
- Wine sauce – Culinary sauce
- Worcestershire sauce – English fermented condiment

== Prepared sauces ==
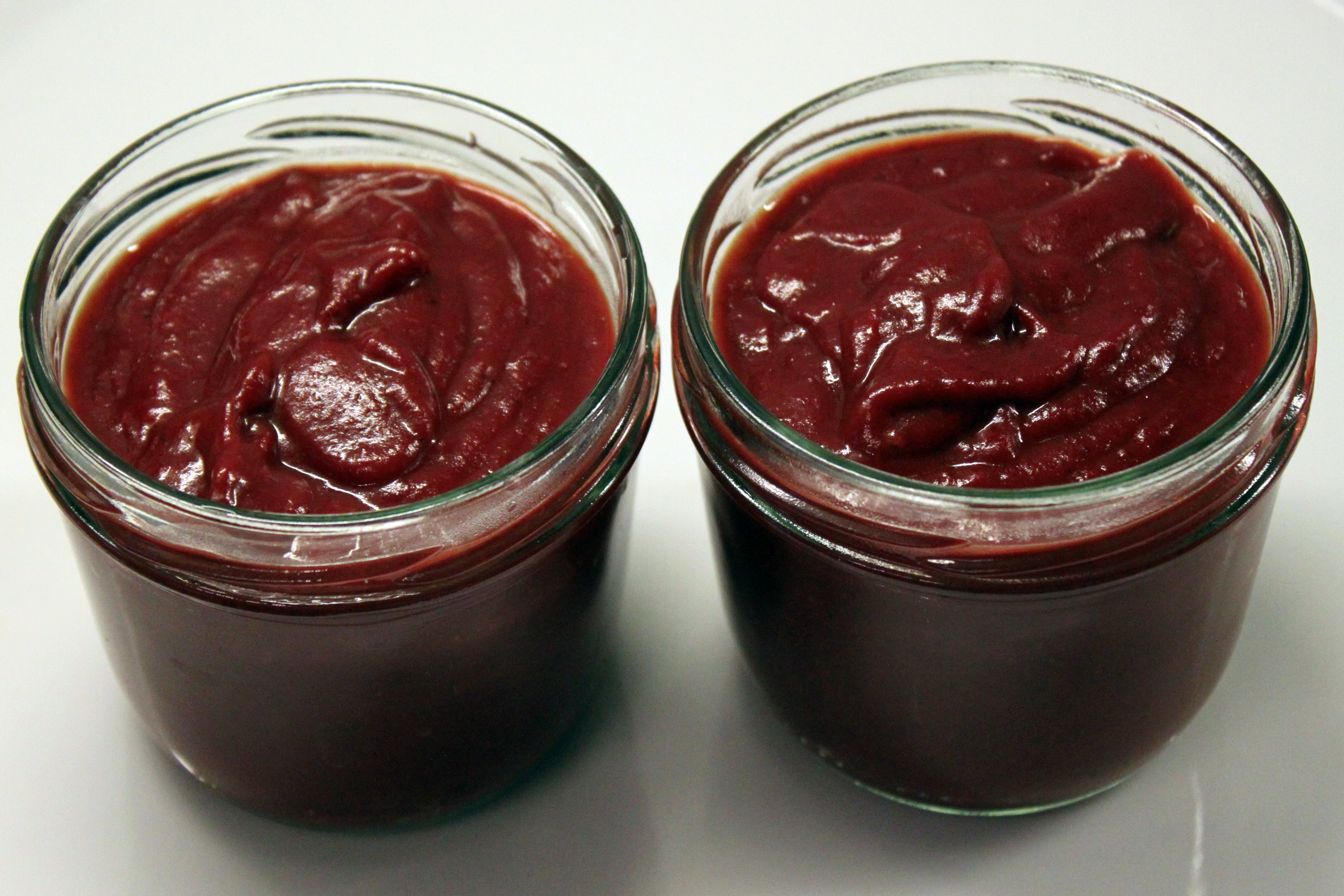
Ketchup

- Alfredo sauce, a creamy sauce replicating the butter and Parmesan cheese flavours of pasta Alfredo
- Baconnaise – Brand of bacon-flavored condiment
- Cheez Whiz – Processed cheese sauce
- HP sauce – British steak sauce
- Ketchup – Sauce used as a condiment
- Maggi – International food brand
- Magic Shell – American food and beverage manufacturer
- McDonald's sauces – Fast-food chain menu items
- Mustard (condiment) – Condiment made from mustard seeds
- OK Sauce – Brand of brown sauce
- Pickapeppa Sauce – Jamaican sauce
- Salsa Lizano – Costa Rican condiment
- Salsa (prepared) – Condiment used in Mexican cuisine
- Tapatío hot sauce – American hot sauce
- Prego – American pasta sauce brand

== By type ==
=== Brown sauces ===
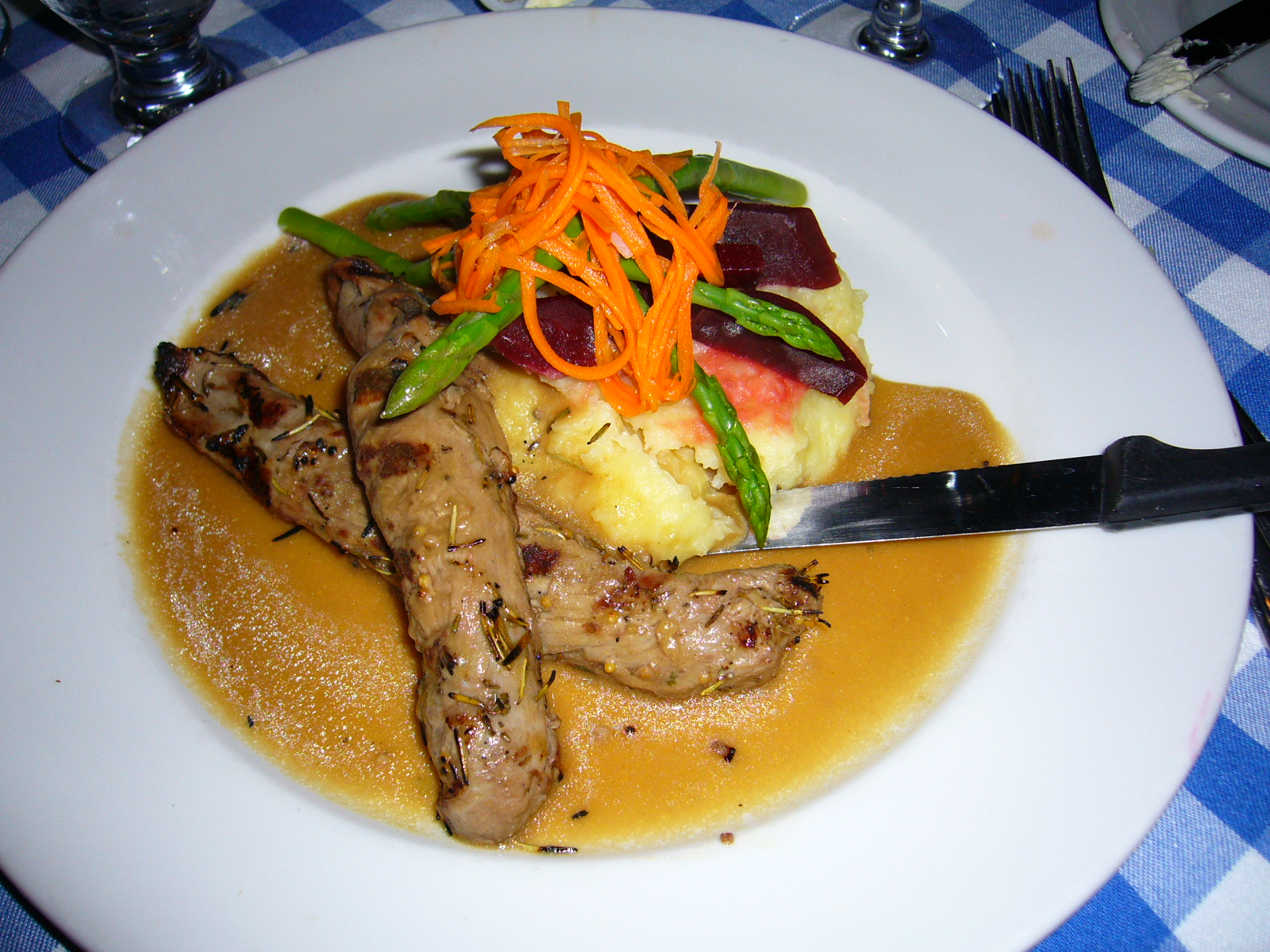
Pork fillet with Bordelaise sauce

Brown sauces – Sauce made with brown meat stock include:

- Bordelaise sauce – French wine sauce
- Chateaubriand sauce – Front cut of a beef tenderloin
- Charcutiere sauce – Compound French sauce
- Chaudfroid sauce – French culinary sauce
- Demi glace – Sauce in French cuisine
- Gravy – Sauce made from the juices of meats
- Mushroom gravy – Type of sauce
- Romesco sauce – Catalan sauce of tomatoes, garlic, and nuts
- Sauce Africaine – French brown sauce with vegetables and herbs
- Sauce au Poivre – Cooking sauce
- Sauce Robert – French brown mustard sauce

=== Butter sauces ===
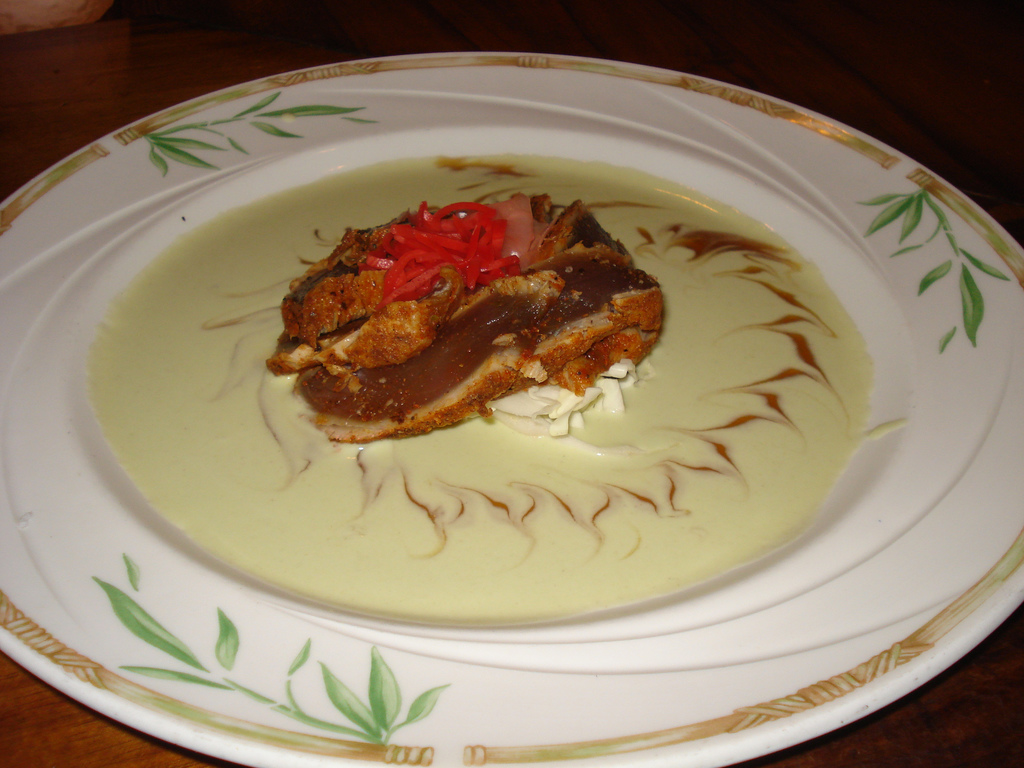
Seared ahi tuna in a beurre blanc sauce

- Beurre blanc – Emulsified butter sauce
- Beurre manie – Thickening agent
- Beurre monté – Melted butter sauce – Butter emulsified with water
- Beurre noisette – Brown butter sauce
- Café de Paris – Butter-based sauce
- Meuniere sauce – French brown butter, parsley, and lemon sauce

=== Emulsified sauces ===
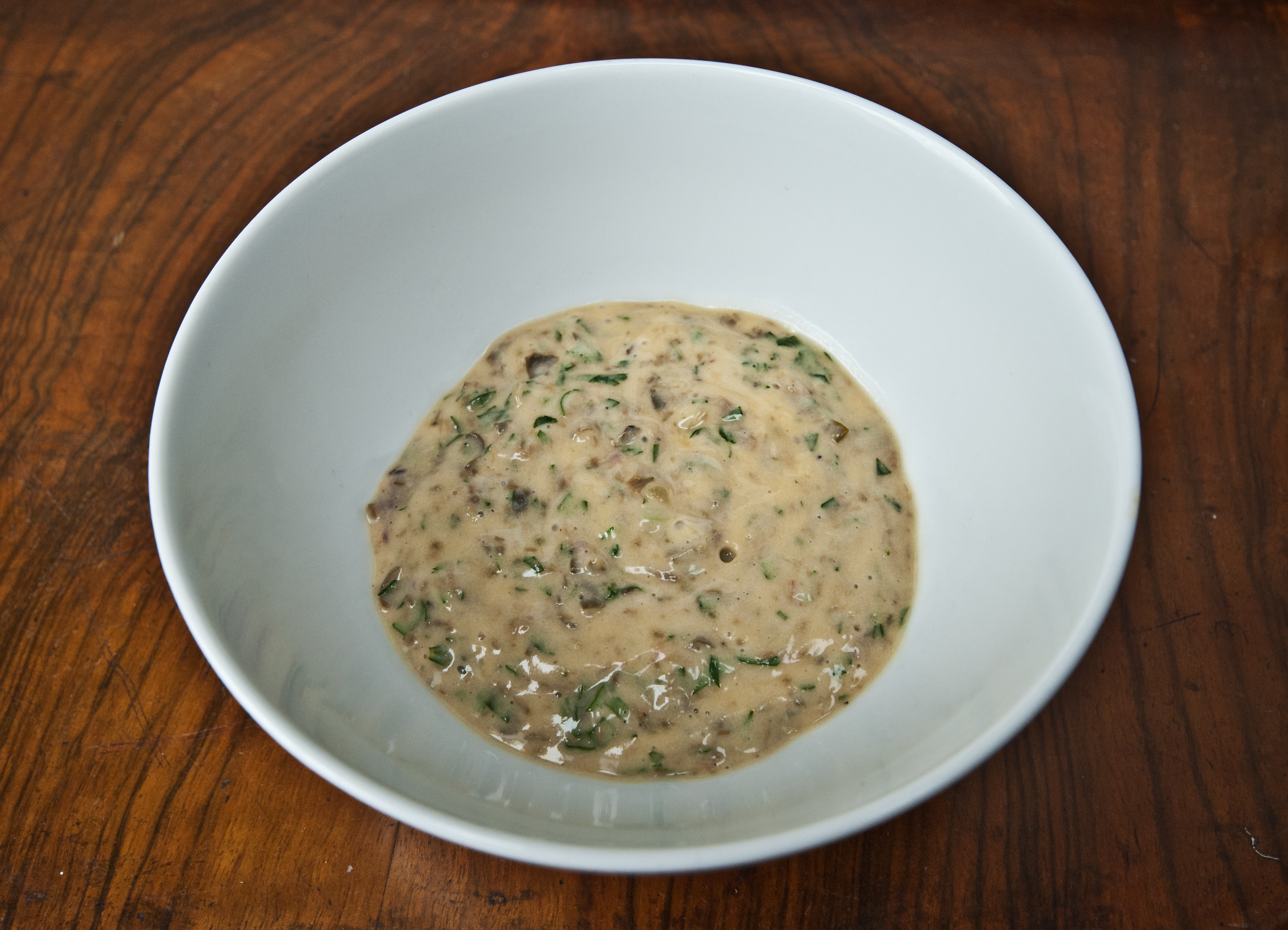
Remoulade seaweed sauce

- Anchoïade – French dipping sauce
- Aioli – West Mediterranean sauce of garlic and oil
- Béarnaise sauce – Sauce made of clarified butter and egg yolk
- Garlic sauce – Sauce with garlic as a main ingredient
- Hollandaise sauce – Sauce made of egg, butter, and lemon
- Mayonnaise – Thick cold sauce
- Remoulade – Mayonnaise-based cold sauce
- Salad cream – Dressing similar to mayonnaise
- Tartare sauce – Mayonnaise-based cold sauce(w/ chilli)

=== Fish sauces ===
- Bagna càuda – Piedmontese hot dish
- Clam sauce – Pasta sauce
- Colatura di alici – Italian fish sauce made from anchovies fermented in brine
- Garum – Historical fermented fish sauce

=== Green sauces ===
- See Green sauce – Sauce made from chopped herbs

=== Tomato sauces ===
- Tomato sauces – Sauce made primarily from tomatoes
- Ketchup – Sauce used as a condiment

=== Hot sauces ===
- Pepper sauces

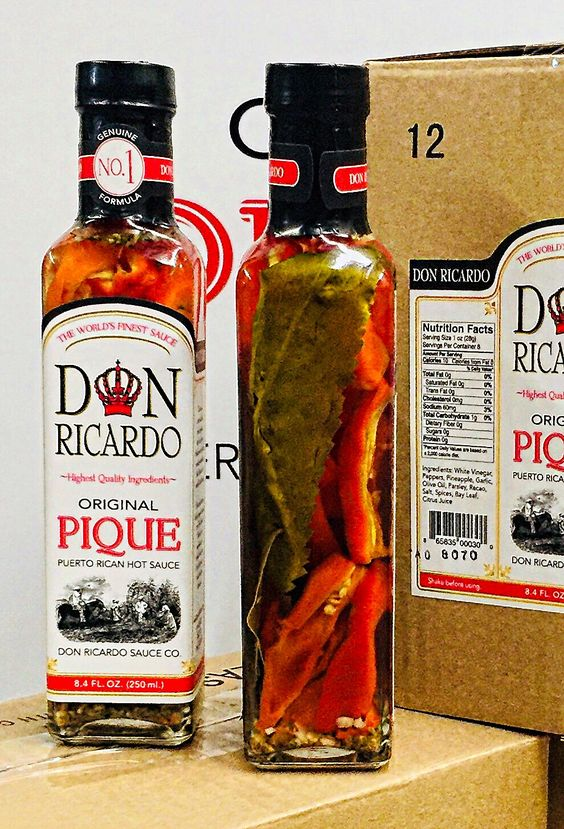
Pique sauce

- Mustard sauces
  - Mustard – Condiment made from mustard seeds
- Chile pepper-tinged sauces

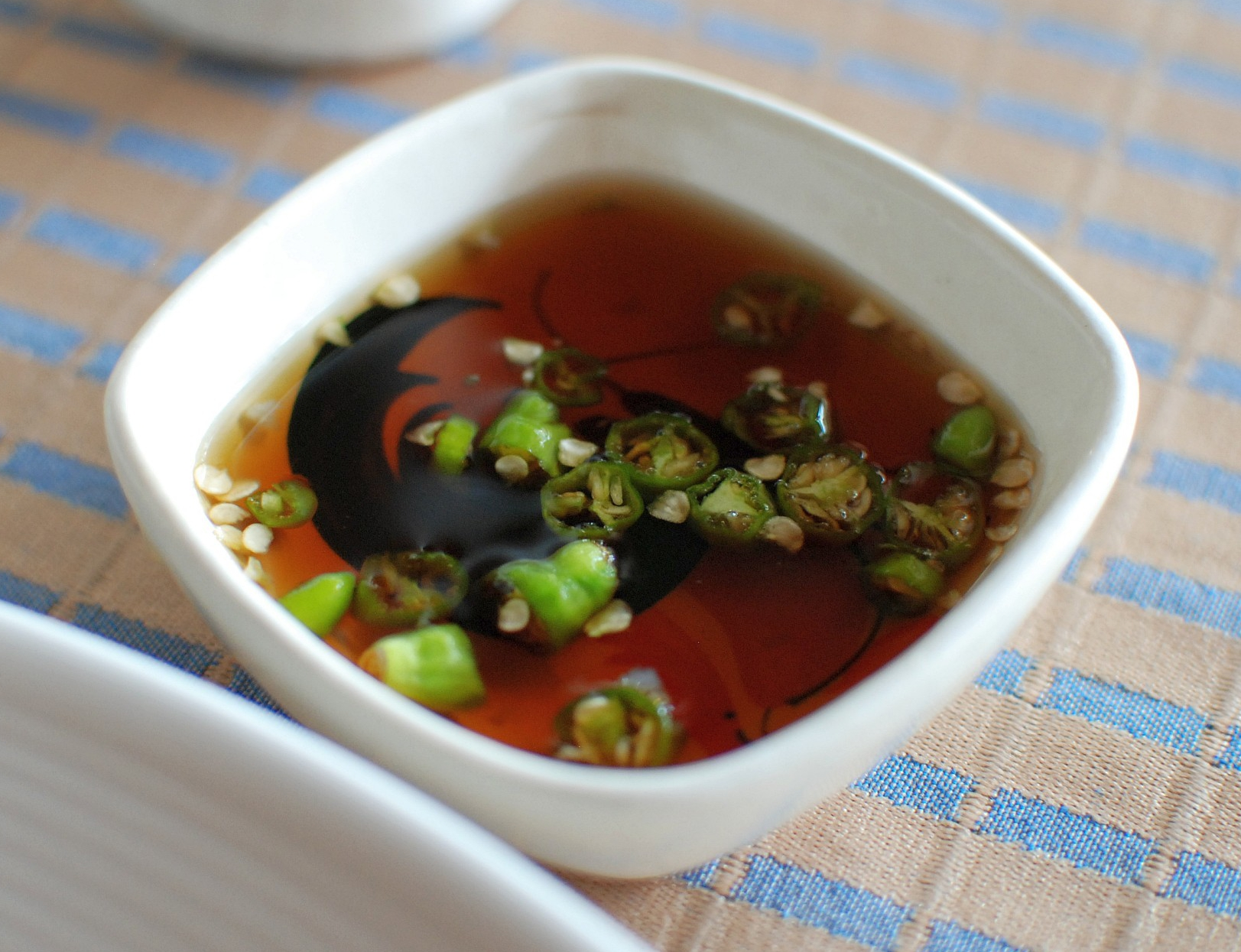
Phrik nam pla is a common hot sauce in Thai cuisine

- Condiments made from hot sauce include:
  - Buffalo Sauce – American dish of spicy chicken wings
  - Chili sauce – Condiment prepared with chili peppers
  - Datil pepper – Variety of chili pepper sauce
  - Enchilada sauce – A red sauce composed of dried red chili peppers soaked and ground into a sauce with other seasonings
  - Pique Sauce – Puerto Rican hot sauce
  - Sriracha sauce – Thai hot sauce
  - Tabasco sauce – American hot sauce brand

=== Meat-based sauces ===
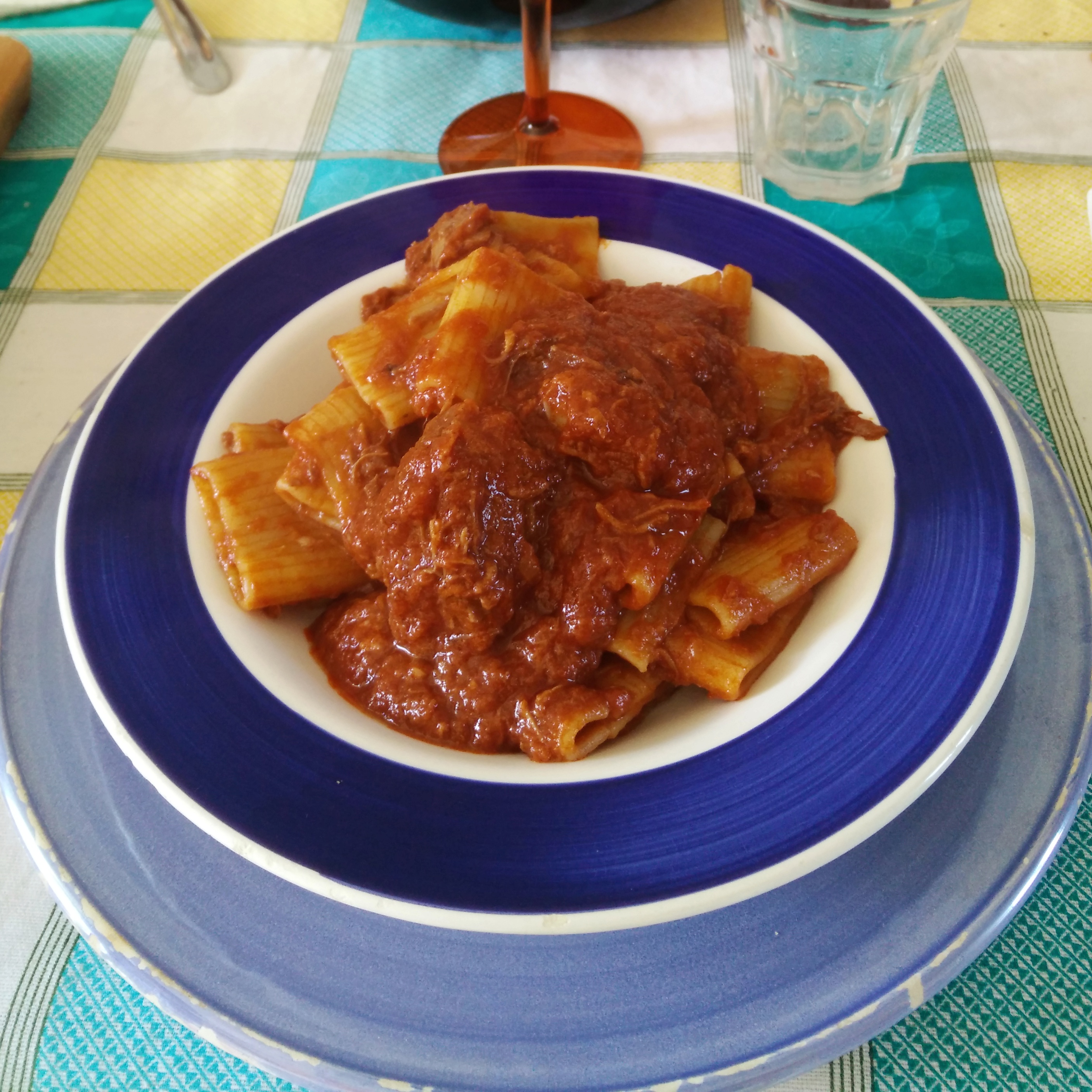
Neapolitan ragù served with paccheri pasta

- Amatriciana sauce – Italian pasta sauce
- Bolognese sauce – Main variety of ragù in Italian cuisine
- Carbonara – Italian pasta dish
- Cincinnati chili – Spiced meat sauce used as a topping for spaghetti
- Neapolitan ragù – Meat-based sauce from Naples, Italy
- Picadillo – Ground meat and tomato dish popular in Latin America and the Philippines
- Ragù – Meat-based sauce in Italian cuisine
- Ragù di salsiccia – Variety of ragù

=== Pink sauces ===
- See Pink sauce

=== Sauces made of chopped fresh ingredients ===
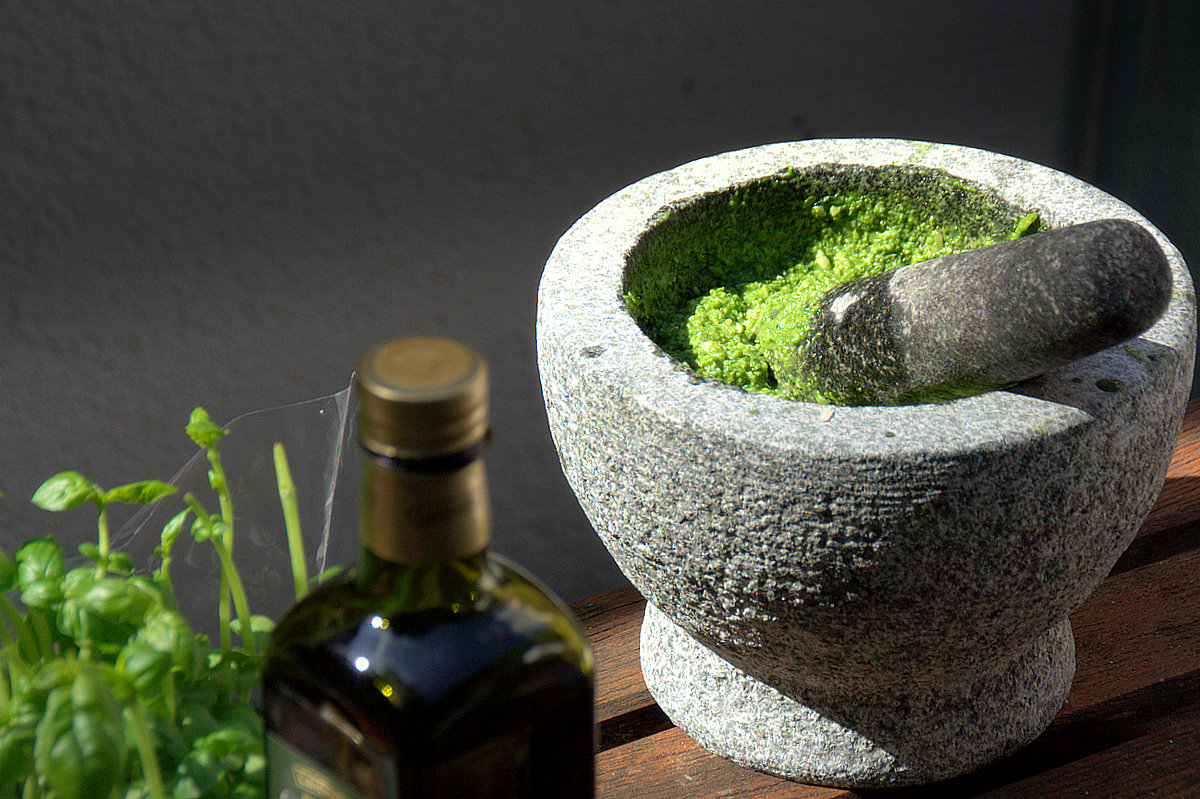
Fresh-ground pesto sauce, prepared with a mortar and pestle

- Chimichurri – Uncooked sauce for meat
- Gremolata – Condiment for ossobuco
- Miti (also samilolo/tai monomono) - sauce common throughout Polynesia by mixing salt water with chunks of young coconut flesh and other aromatics to ferment and later puree
- Mujdei – Romanian garlic and vegetable oil sauce
- Onion sauce - Sauce made with onions
- Persillade – Sauce or seasoning mix
- Pesto – Italian food paste
- Pico de gallo – Mexican condiment
- Latin American Salsa cruda of various kinds
- Salsa verde – Spicy Mexican sauce made from tomatillos
- Sauce gribiche – Cold egg sauce
- Sauce vierge – French sauce
- Tkemali – Georgian plum sauce

=== Sweet sauces ===
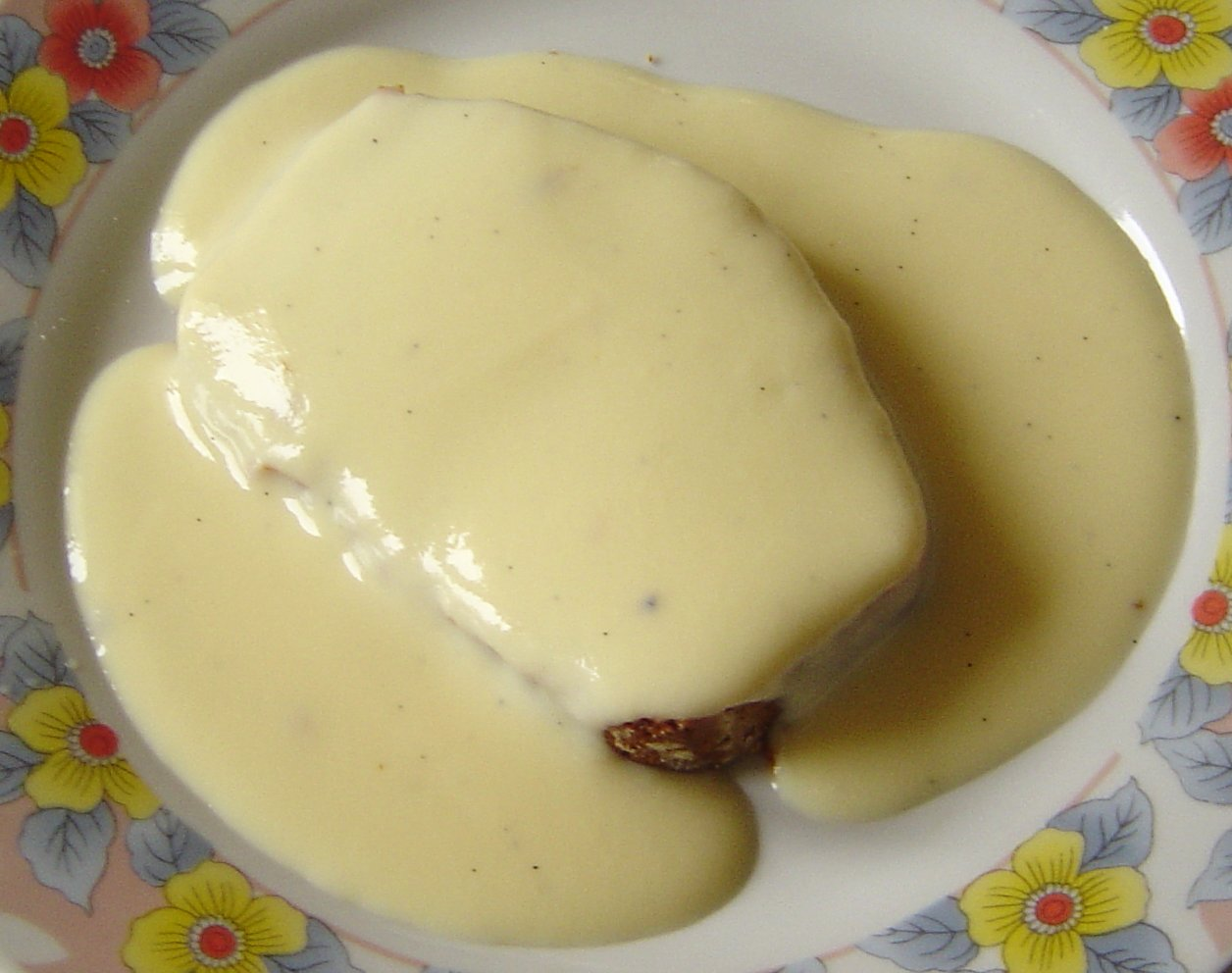
Crème anglaise over a slice of pain d'épices

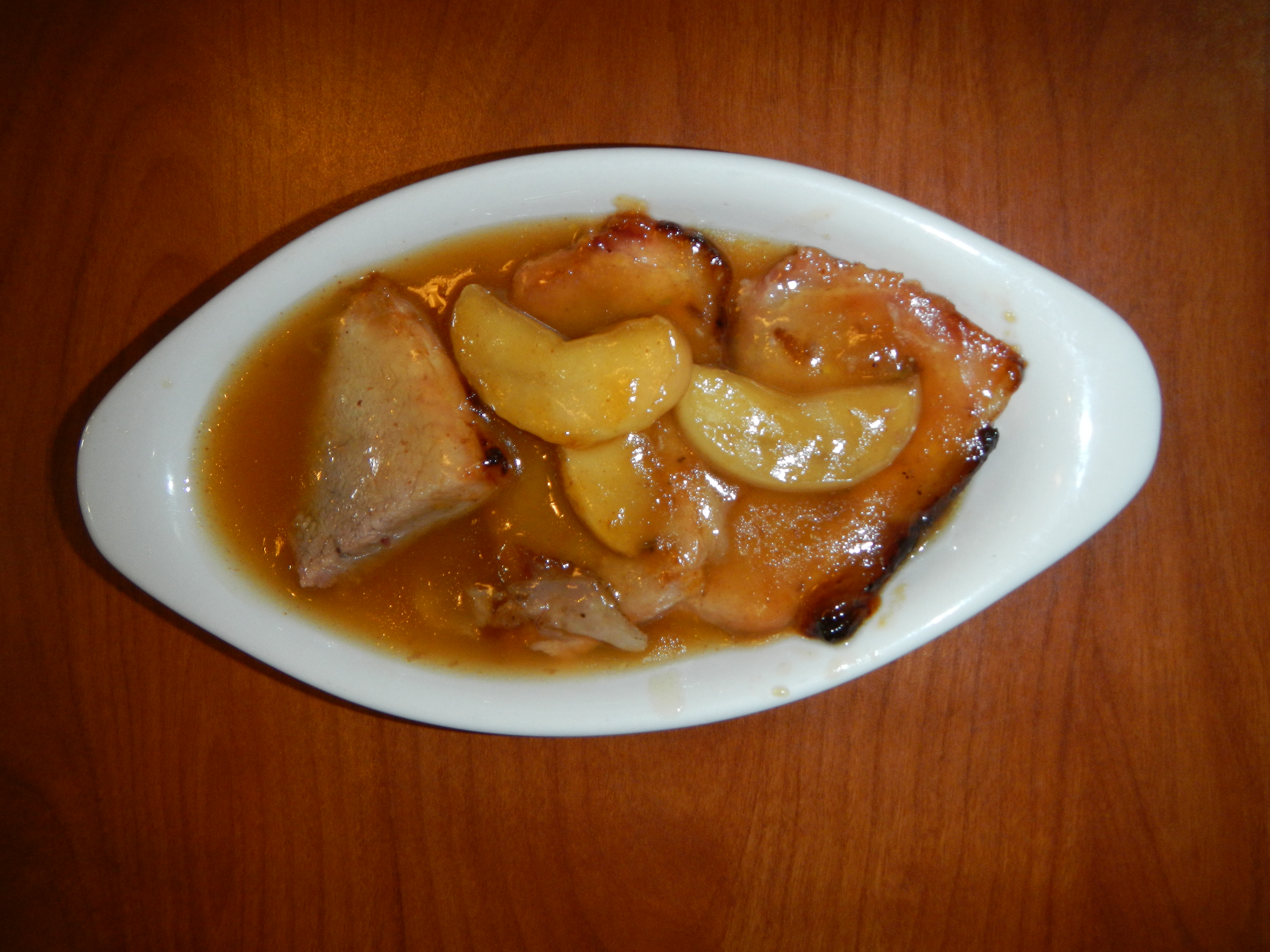
Pork with peach sauce

- Apple sauce – Purée made from apples
- Blueberry sauce – Compote or savory sauce made with blueberries
- Butterscotch sauce – Type of confectionery
- Caramel – Confectionery product made by heating sugars
- Chocolate gravy – Gravy made with cocoa powder
- Chocolate syrup – Chocolate-flavored condiment used as a topping or ingredient
- Cranberry sauce – Sauce made from cranberries
- Crème anglaise – Light sweetened pouring custard
- Custard – Semi-solid cooked mixture of milk and egg
- Fudge sauce – Chocolate-flavored condiment used as a topping or ingredient
- Hard sauce – Dessert sauce of sugar, butter, and spirits – not liquid, but called a sauce nonetheless
- Sweet chili sauce – Condiment primarily used as a dip
- Mango sauce – Tropical fruit
- Peach sauce – Sauce made from peaches
- Plum sauce – Chinese condiment
- Strawberry sauce – Dessert sauce
- Syrup – Thick, viscous solution of sugar in water
- Tkemali – Georgian plum sauce
- Zabaione – Italian dessert, or sometimes drink

=== White sauces ===
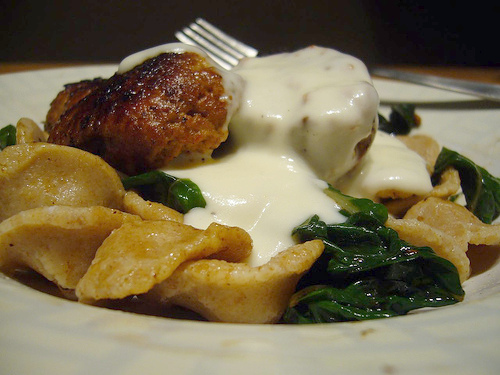
Mornay sauce poured over an orecchiette pasta dish

- Alfredo sauce – Creamy pasta dish with butter and cheese
- Béchamel sauce – French white sauce based on roux and milk
- Caruso sauce – Cream sauce for pasta
- Mushroom sauce – White or brown sauce prepared with mushrooms
- Mornay sauce – Type of béchamel sauce including cheese
- Sauce Allemande – Sauce used in classic French cuisine
- Sauce Américaine – Recipe from classic French cookery
- Suprême sauce – Classic French sauce
- Velouté sauce – French sauce made from roux and light stock
- White sauce (Virginia) – Dipping sauce in Virginia
- Yogurt sauce – Food produced by bacterial fermentation of milk

== By region ==
=== Africa ===
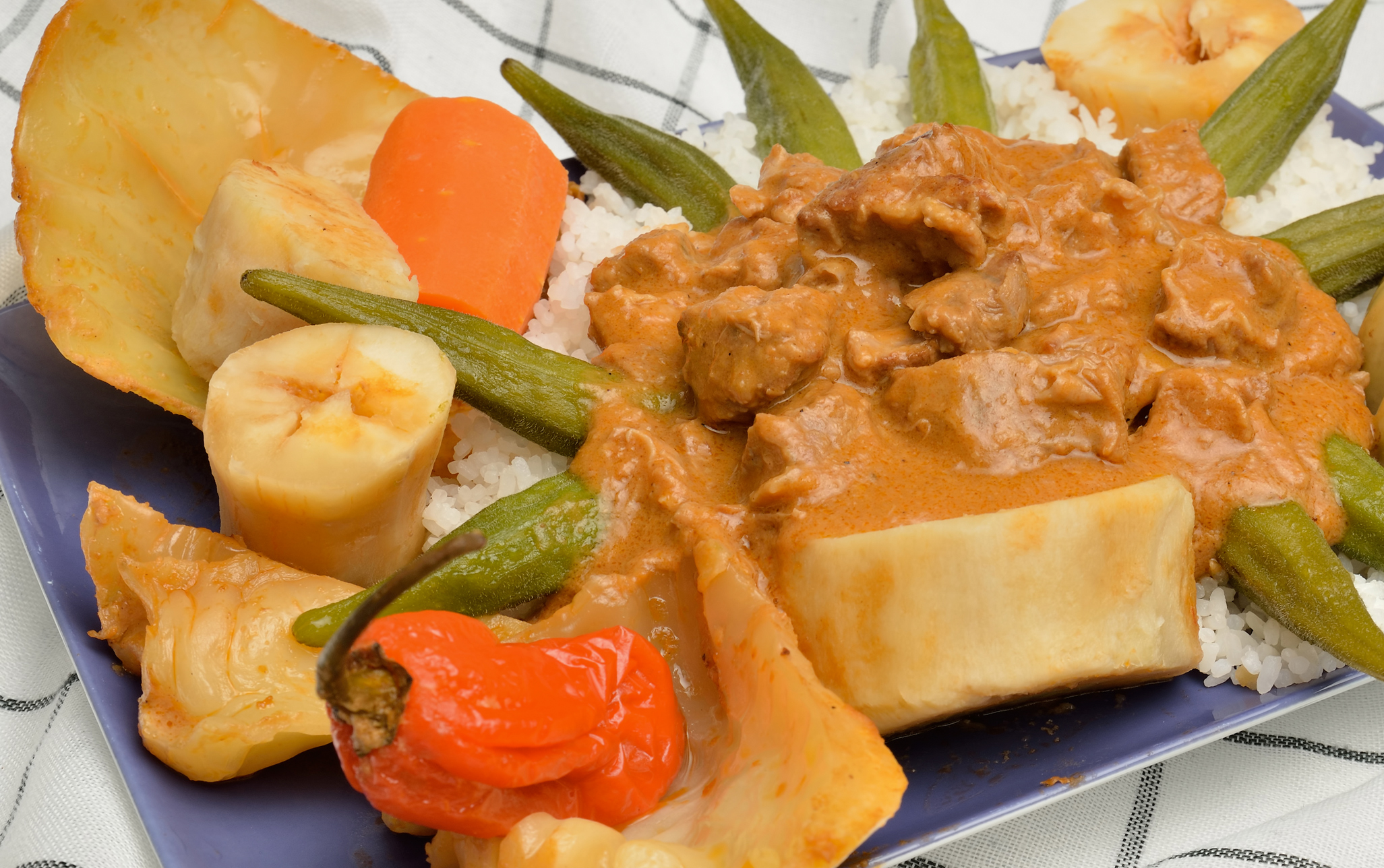
Maafe sauce is based upon peanuts and Calvados

Sauces in African cuisine include:

- Chermoula – Relish from Maghrebi cuisine
- Harissa – Tunisian hot chili pepper paste
- Maafe – Stew in West African cuisine
- Moambe – Ingredient made from palm nuts
- Shito – Ghanaian hot black pepper sauce

=== Asia ===
==== East Asian sauces ====
Sauces in East Asian cuisine include:

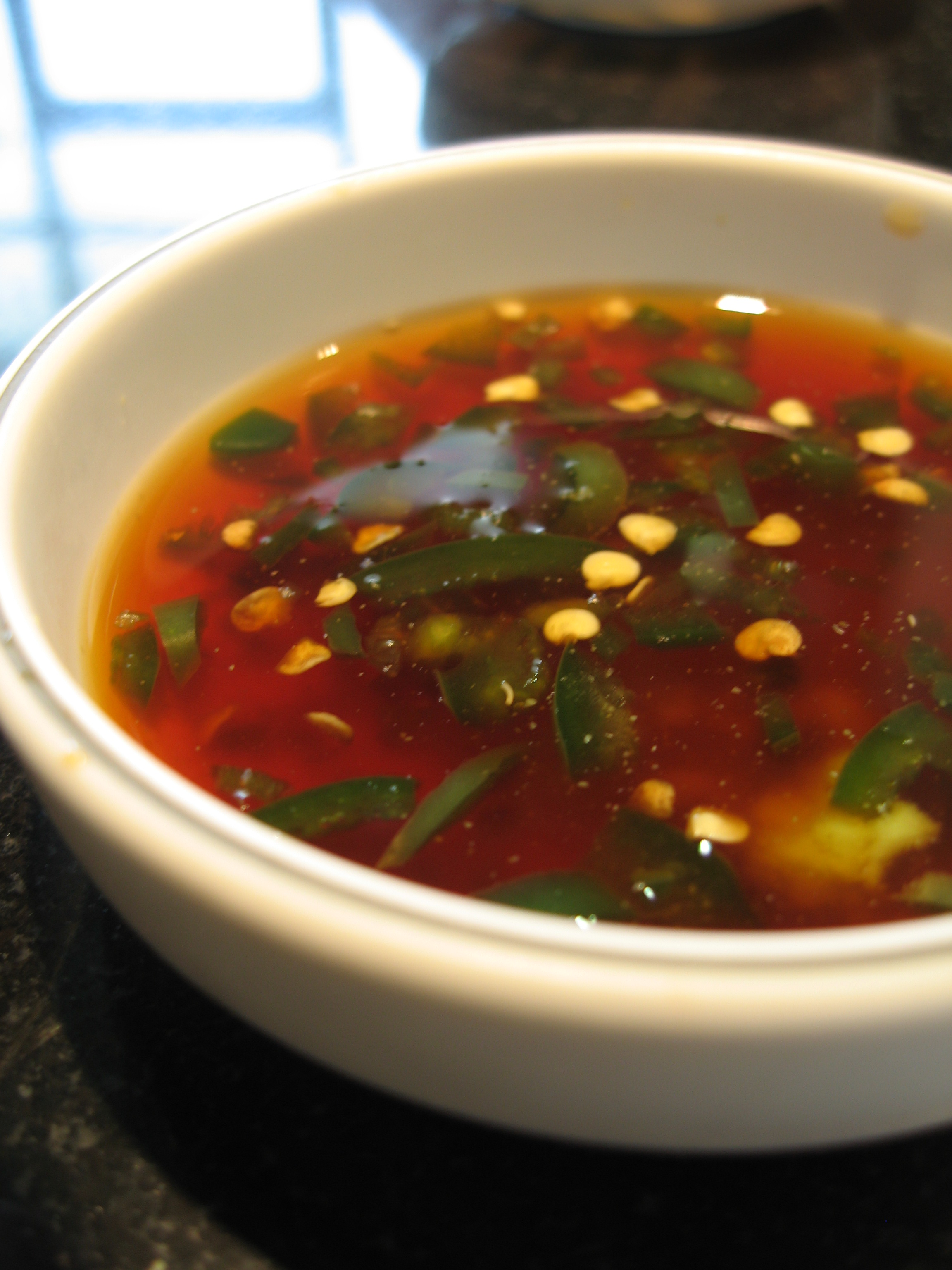
Choganjang, a Korean sauce prepared with the base ingredients of ganjang (a Korean soy sauce made with fermented soybeans) and vinegar

- Doubanjiang – Chinese spicy bean paste
- Doenjang – Korean fermented bean paste
- Gochujang – Spicy fermented Korean condiment
- Hoisin sauce – Sauce commonly used in Chinese cuisine
- Mala sauce – Spicy Chinese seasoning
- Mirin – Japanese rice wine used for cooking
- Oyster sauce – Condiment made by cooking oysters
- Plum sauce – Chinese condiment (Chinese; see umeboshi paste below for Japanese pickled plum sauce)
- Ponzu – Japanese citrus-based condiment
- Soy sauce – East Asian liquid condiment
  - Sweet soy sauce – Sweetened aromatic soy sauce, originating from Java, Indonesia
- Ssamjang – Spicy soybean paste used in Korean cuisine
- Tentsuyu – Tempura dipping sauce
- Umeboshi paste – Sour pickled Japanese fruit, or Japanese pickled plum sauce, a thick sauce from a fruit called a plum in English but which is closer to an apricot
- XO sauce – Spicy seafood sauce from Hong Kong

Cooked sauces

- Lobster sauce – Sauce in North American Chinese cuisine
- Shacha sauce – Chinese condiment
- Siu haau sauce – Cantonese barbecue sauce
- Sweet and sour sauce – Cooking method
- Sweet bean sauce, also known as Tianmianjiang – Sweet savory sauce in China and Korea
- Teriyaki – Japanese marinade – a way of cooking in Japan, a branch of sauces in North America

==== Southeast Asian sauces ====
Sauces in Southeast Asian cuisine include:

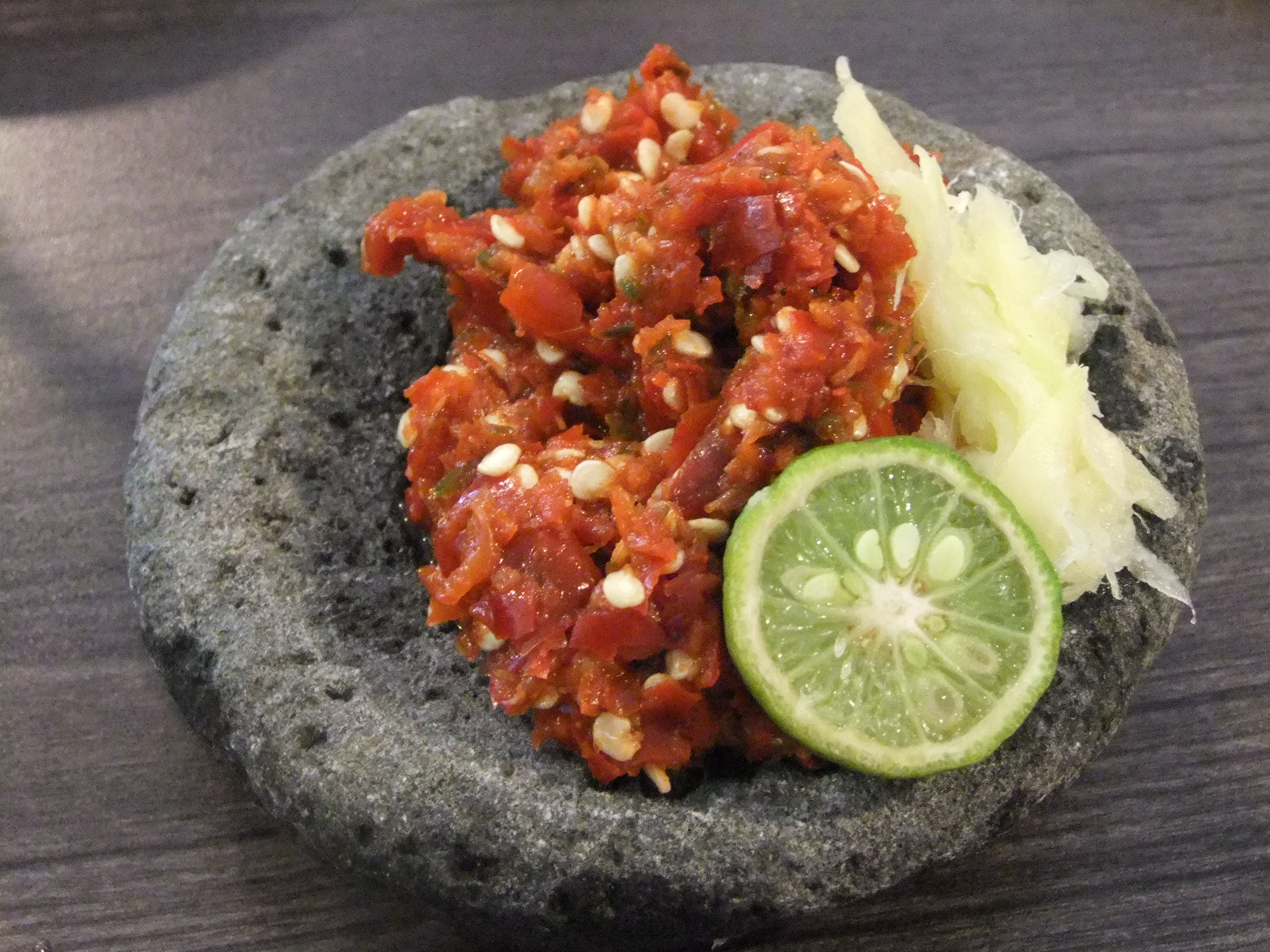
Traditional sambal terasi served on stone mortar with garlic and lime

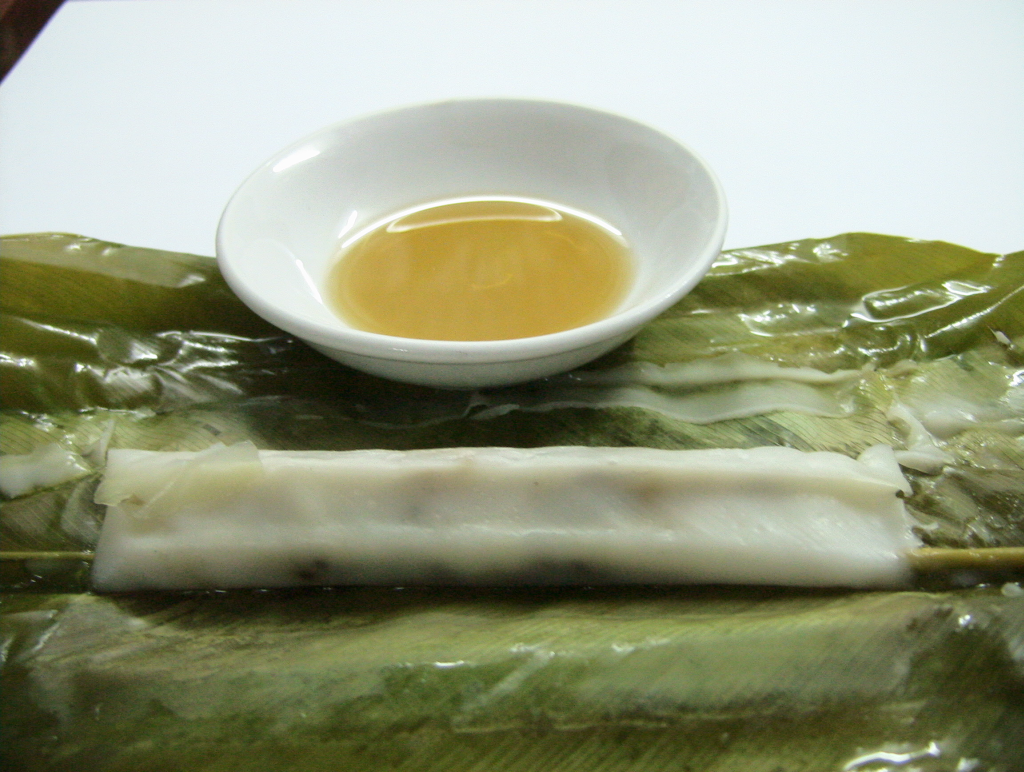
A bowl of Nước chấm

- Budu – Fish sauce originating from east coast of Peninsular Malaysia
- Fish sauce – Condiment made from fish
- Mắm nêm – Vietnamese fermented fish sauce
- Nam chim – Thai sauce
- Nam phrik – Thai chili sauce
- Nước chấm – Vietnamese dipping sauce
- Padaek – Lao pickled or fermented fish condiment
- Pecel – Indonesian vegetable dish
- Pla ra – Southeast Asian fermented fish seasoning
- Sambal – Southeast Asian spicy relish or sauce
- Peanut sauce, also known as Satay sauce – Indonesian sauce made from ground roasted or fried peanuts
- Saus cabai – Condiment prepared with chili peppers
- Sriracha sauce – Thai hot sauce
- Sweet soy sauce – Sweetened aromatic soy sauce, originating from Java, Indonesia
- Tương – Condiment made from soybeans

=== Caucasus ===
Sauces in Caucasian cuisine include:

- Ajika – Georgian dip
- Tkemali – Georgian plum sauce
- Satsivi – Georgian poultry dish

=== Mediterranean ===
Sauces in Mediterranean cuisine include:

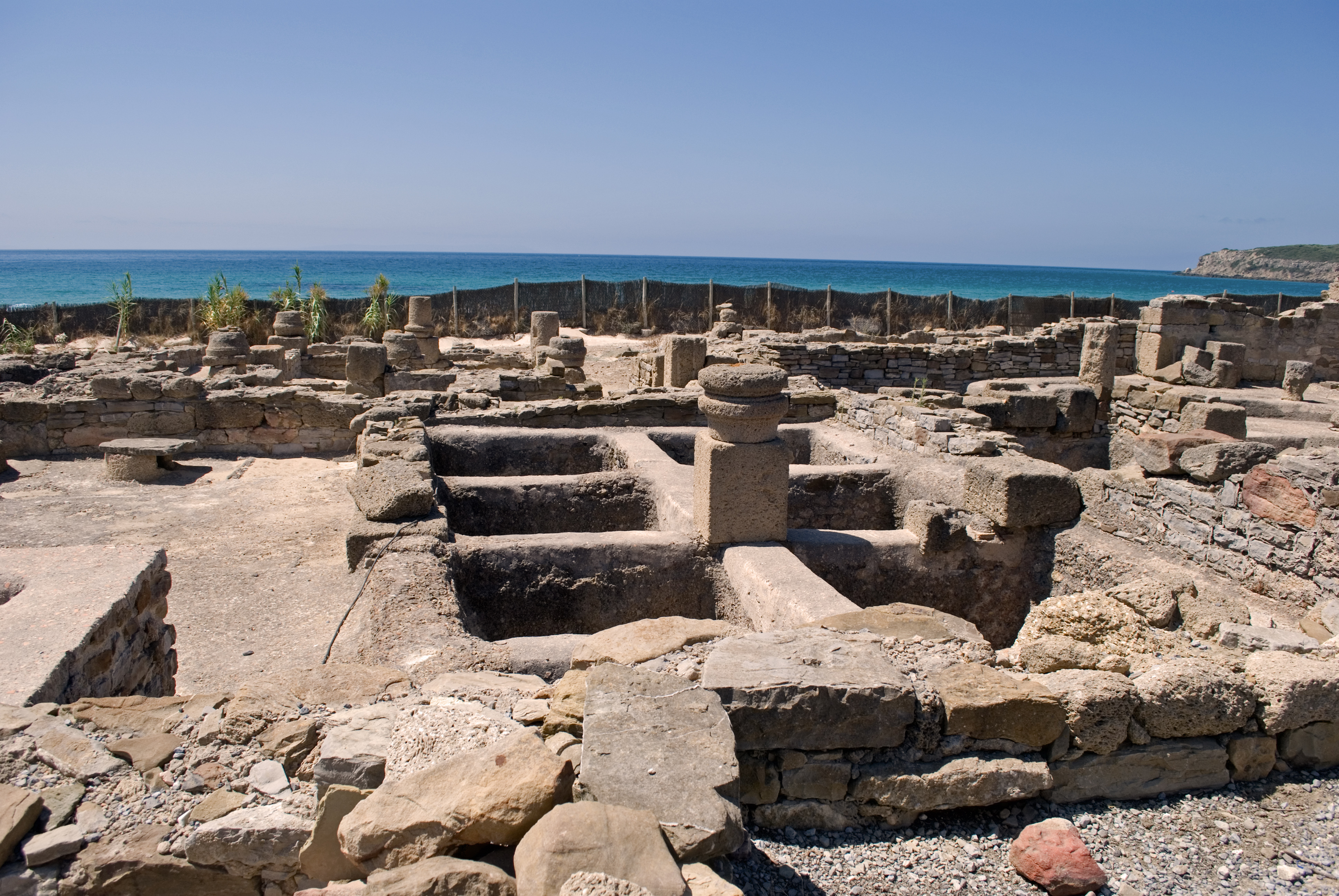
An historic Garum (fermented fish sauce) factory at Baelo Claudia in the Cádiz, Spain

- Garum – Historical fermented fish sauce

=== Middle East ===
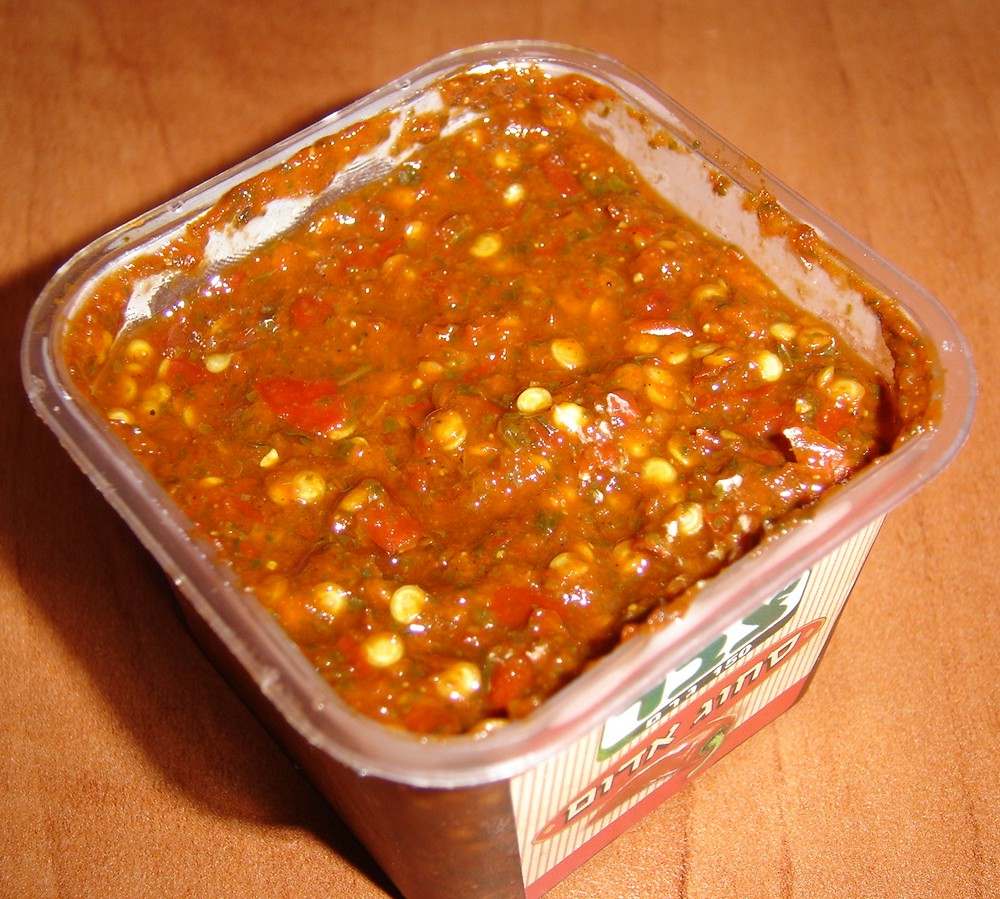
Commercially prepared red Sahawiq, a Middle Eastern hot sauce

Sauces in Middle Eastern cuisine include:

- Muhammara – Red pepper dip from Syrian cuisine
- Sahawiq – Yemeni hot sauce
- Toum – Garlic sauce common in the Levant
- Cacık – Yogurt sauce or dip found in Turkey, Iran, and Greece

=== Polynesian ===
Sauces in Polynesian cuisine include:

- Miti - sauce made from fermented young coconut flesh

=== South America ===
Sauces in South American cuisine include:

- Ají (sauce) – Ají-based condiment from Andean cuisine
- Caruso sauce – Cream sauce for pasta
- Chancaca – Sugar sauce in Andean cuisine
- Chimichurri – Uncooked sauce for meat
- Hogao – Colombian-style sofrito
- Salsa de maní – Ecuadorian peanut sauce
- Tucupi – Sauce used in Brazilian cuisine, extracted from the Cassava root

== By country ==
=== Argentina ===
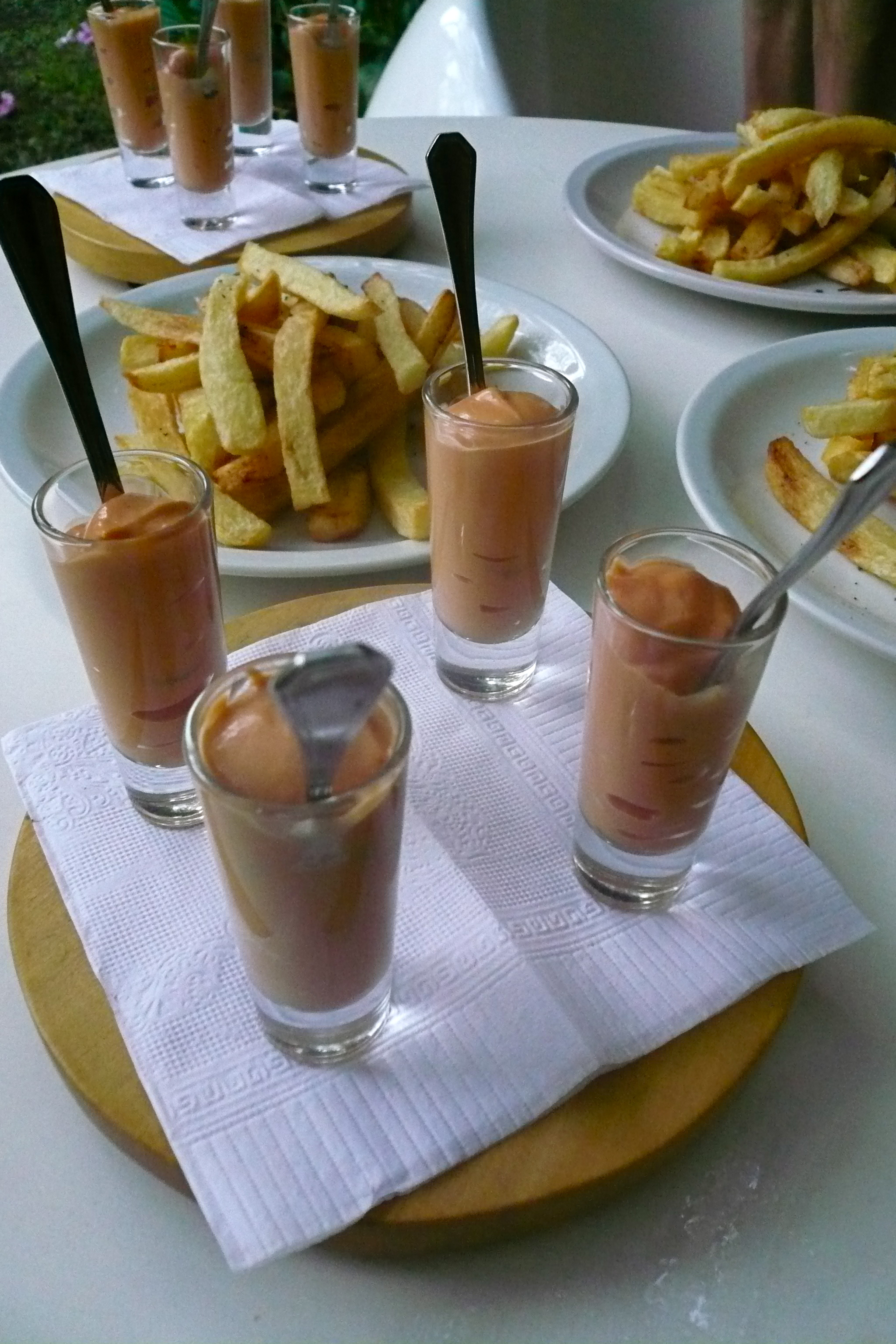
Salsa golf served at a "taste-off" in Buenos Aires

Sauces in Argentine cuisine include:

- Chimichurri – Uncooked sauce for meat
- Salsa criolla – Type of salad or relish found in Latin American cuisine
- Salsa golf – Cold sauce of mayonnaise and tomatoes

=== Barbados ===
Sauces in the cuisine of Barbados include:

- Bajan pepper sauce – Type of condiment

=== Belgium ===
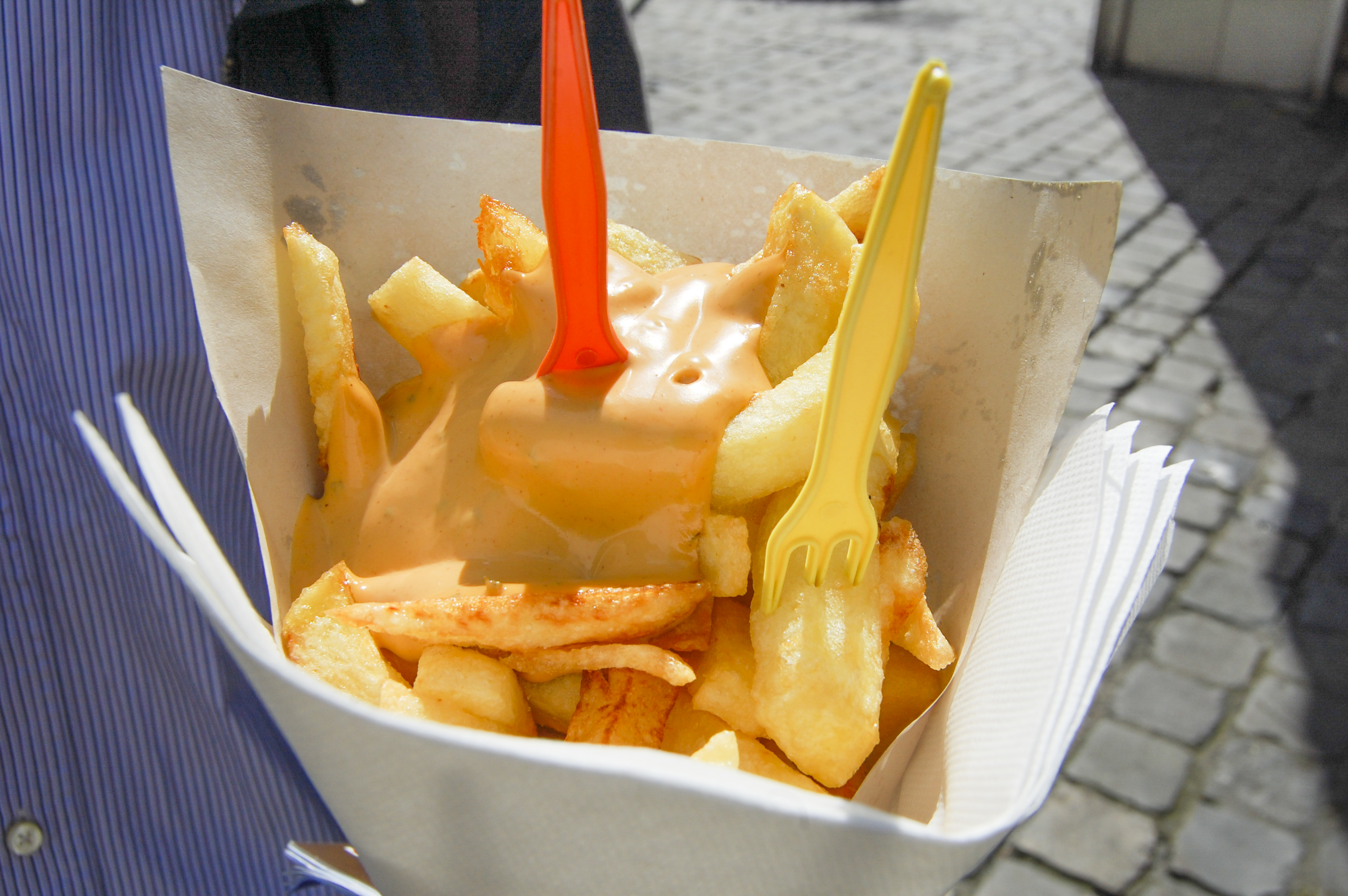
Belgian fries with andalouse sauce in Brussels

Sauces in Belgian cuisine include:

- Andalouse sauce – a mildly spiced sauce made from mayonnaise, tomatoes and peppers
- Brasil sauce – mayonnaise with pureed pineapple, tomato and spices
- Zigeuner sauce – Sauce in French cuisine – A "gypsy" sauce of tomatoes, paprika and chopped bell peppers, borrowed from Germany

=== Bolivia ===
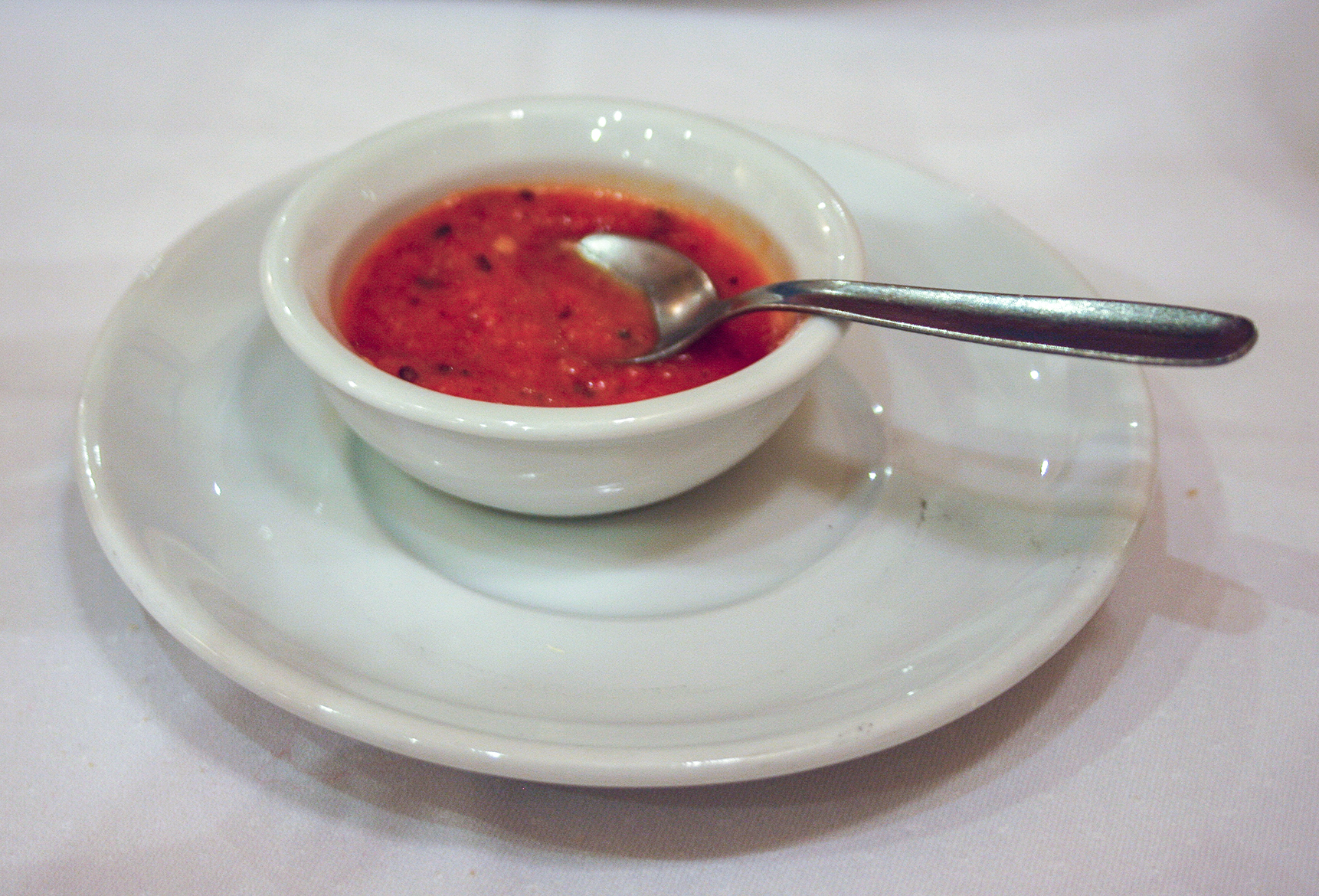
Llajwa

Sauces in Bolivian cuisine include:

- Llajwa – Bolivian chili sauce

=== Brazil ===
Sauces in Brazilian cuisine include:

- Vinagrete – Typical Brazilian condiment
- Tucupi – Sauce used in Brazilian cuisine, extracted from the Cassava root

=== Canada ===
Sauces in Canadian cuisine include:

- Donair sauce – Canadian restaurant chain
- Honey garlic sauce – Sweet and sour sauce
- Honey dill – Condiment

=== Chile ===
Sauces in Chilean cuisine include:

- Pebre – Chilean condiment
- Salsa Americana – Chilean relish made of pickles, pickled onions, and pickled carrots

=== China ===
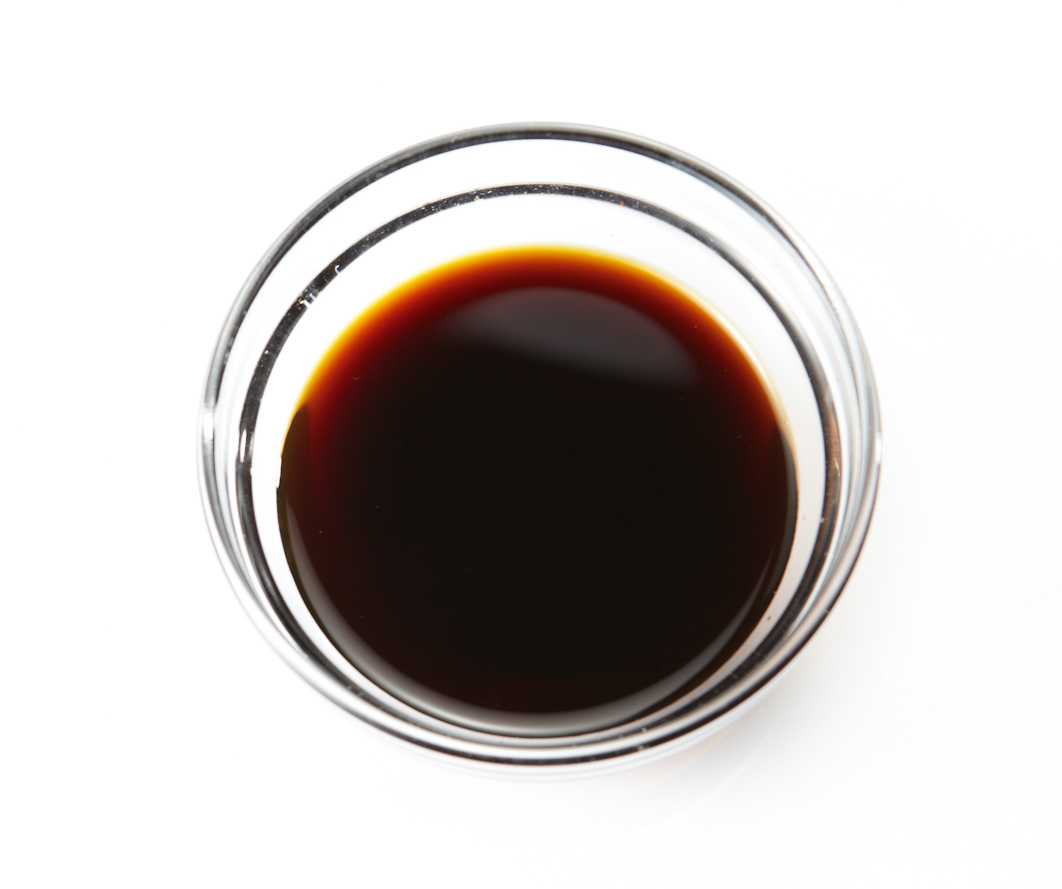
Soy sauce

- Light soy sauce (生抽) – a lighter-colored salty-flavored sauce used for seasoning and not as a dipping sauce
- Dark soy sauce (老抽) – a darker-colored sauce used for color
- Seasoned soy sauce – usually light soy sauce seasoned with herbs, spices, sugar, or other sauces
- Sweet bean sauce (甜面酱) – a thick savory paste
- Oyster sauce (蚝油)
- Fermented bean curd (腐乳) – usually cubes of tofu, and sometimes other spices and seasonings, which are used as a condiment or marinade along with some of the brine
- Douchi (豆豉) – fermented black beans, usually in a brine
- Cooking wine (料酒)
- Black vinegar (陈醋)
- Cha Shao sauce (叉烧酱, Cantonese: Char Siu)
- Duo Jiao (剁椒) - chili sauce.
- Chili oil (红油) – usually made by pouring hot oil that's been seasoned with spices onto ground chili flakes and left to steep
- Doubanjiang (豆瓣酱) – a mix of fermented beans, chilis, salt, and flour used for flavor and color
- Soy bean Paste / Yellow bean paste (黄酱)
- Fish sauce (鱼露)
- Garlic chive flower sauce (韭花酱)
- Guaiwei (怪味)
- Haixian sauce (海鲜酱, Cantonese: Hoisin)
- Plum sauce (苏梅酱)
- Sesame oil (香油)
- Sesame Paste (麻酱)
- Mala (麻辣)
- Shao Kao sauce (烧烤酱, Cantonese: Siu Haau) – a thick, savory, slightly spicy BBQ sauce generally known as the primary barbecue sauce used within Chinese and Cantonese cuisine.
- Shacha sauce (沙茶酱) – A sauce or paste that is used as a base for soups, hotpot, as a rub, stir fry seasoning and as a component for dipping sauces.
- XO sauce (XO酱) – a spicy seafood sauce that originated from Hong Kong.
- Yongfeng chili sauce (永丰辣酱)
- Yuxiang (魚香)

=== Colombia ===
Sauces in Colombian cuisine include:

- Hogao – Colombian-style sofrito
- Ají (sauce) – Ají-based condiment from Andean cuisine

=== Denmark ===
Sauces in Danish cuisine include:

- Persillesovs – Cream sauce seasoned with parsley – a key ingredient in the Danish national dish Stegt flæsk med persillesovs
- Brun sovs – Sauce made with brown meat stock

=== England ===
Sauces in English cuisine include:

- Apple sauce
- Bread sauce
- Brown sauce, including commercial brands:

- A1 Sauce
- Daddies
- HP Sauce

- Cumberland sauce
- Horseradish sauce
- Marie Rose sauce
- Mint sauce
- Shrewsbury sauce
- Worcestershire sauce

=== France ===
In French cuisine, the "mother sauces" (sauces mères, also grandes sauces) are the foundation of many other "daughter sauces" (petites sauces). Different classifications of mother sauces have been proposed since at least the early 19th century; the most common current list is Béchamel, Espagnole, Hollandaise, Tomate, and Velouté. French sauces include:

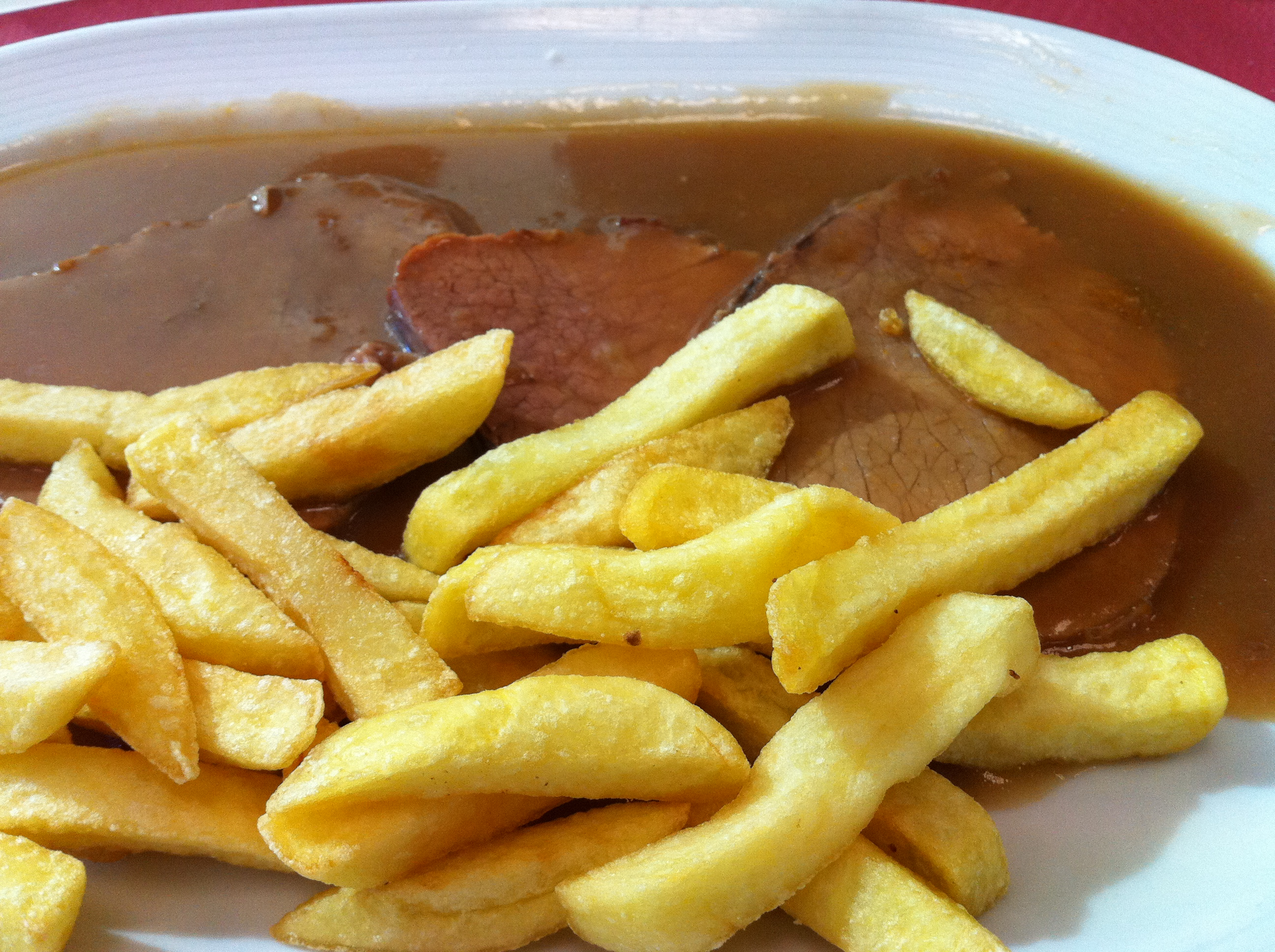
Beef with espagnole sauce and chips

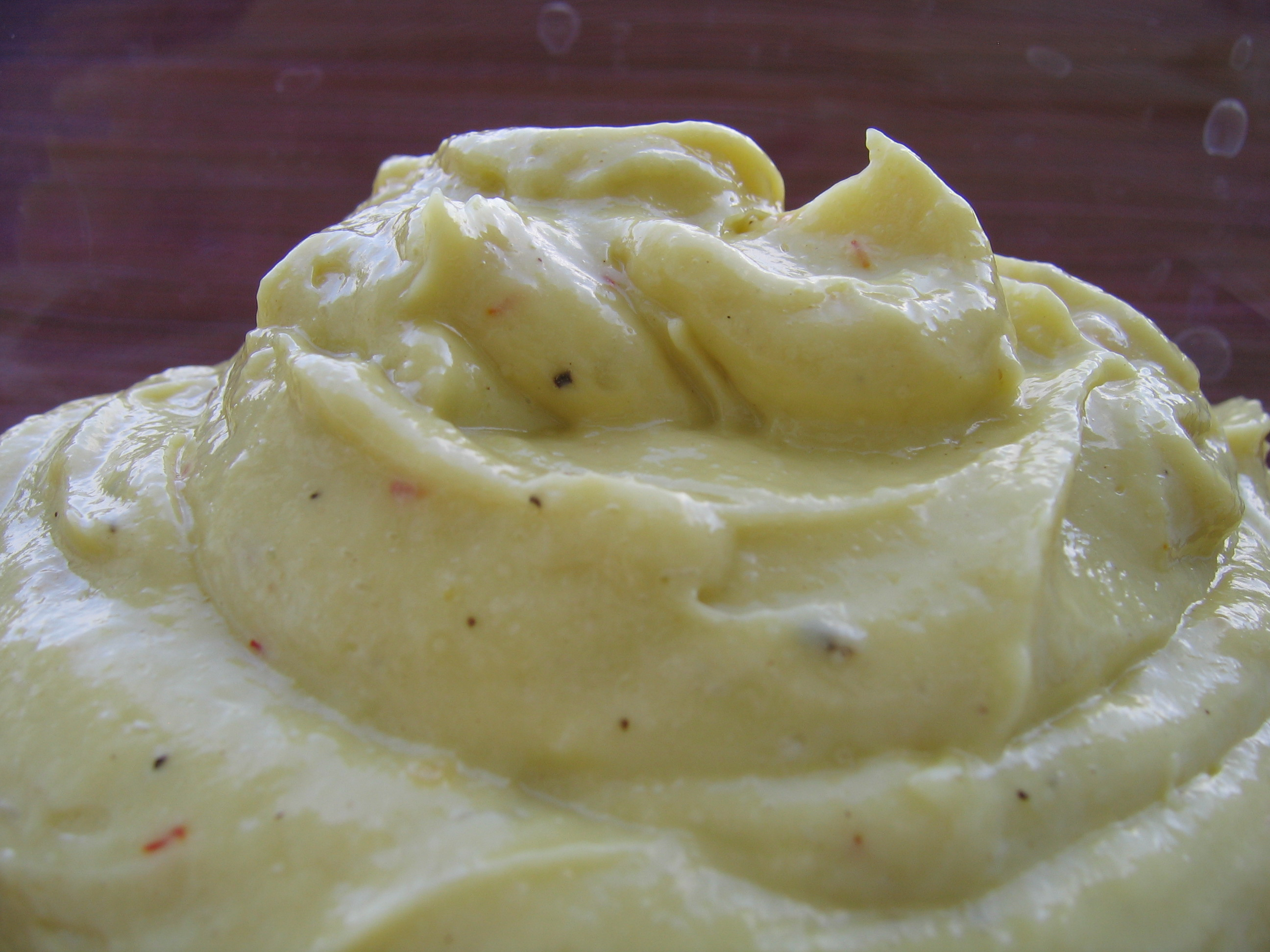
Rouille sauce

- Allemande – Veal stock, veal velouté, lemon juice, mushrooms and egg yolks.
- Américaine – Mayonnaise, blended with puréed lobster and mustard.
- Béarnaise – Reduction of chopped shallots, pepper, tarragon and vinegar, with egg yolks and melted butter.
- Bercy – Chopped shallots, butter and white wine, with either fish stock or meat stock.
- Béchamel – milk-based sauce, thickened with a white roux.
- Beurre blanc – Reduction of butter, vinegar, white wine and shallots.
- Beurre maître d'hôtel – Fresh butter kneaded with chopped parsley, pepper and lemon juice.
- Beurre noir – Browned butter with lemon juice/vinegar and parsley; traditionally served with raie (Skate).
- Beurre noisette – Lightly browned butter with lemon juice.
- Beurre vert – Butter mixed with the juice extracted from spinach.
- Bordelaise – Chopped shallots, pepper, herbs, cooked in red wine and mixed with demi-glace.
- Bourguignonne – Chopped shallots, herbs and mushroom trimmings reduced in red wine and meat stock.
- Bigarade sauce – an orange sauce, commonly for duck à l'orange.
- Bretonne – Two forms: (i) chopped onions, butter, white wine tomatoes, garlic and parsley; (ii) julienne of leeks, celery, mushrooms and onions cooked slowly in butter and mixed with fish velouté.
- Charcutière – Sauce Robert (below) garnished with gherkins.
- Chasseur – Minced mushrooms, butter, shallots and parsley with red wine and demi-glace.
- Demi-glace – A brown sauce, generally the basis of other sauces, made of beef or veal stock, with carrots, onions, mushrooms and tomatoes.
- Espagnole sauce – a fortified brown veal stock sauce.
- Genevoise sauce - A brown sauce made with fish fumet, mirepoix, red wine, and butter usually accompanied with fish.
- Gribiche – Mayonnaise with hard-boiled eggs, mustard, capers and herbs.
- Hollandaise – Vinegar, crushed peppercorns, butter, egg yolks and lemon juice.
- Lyonnaise – Fried onions with white wine and vinegar reduced and mixed with demi-glace.
- Mayonnaise – Egg yolks with vinegar or lemon juice, beaten with oil.
- Nantua – Diced vegetables, butter, fish stock, white wine, cognac and tomatoes.
- Périgueux – Demi-glace, chopped truffles and madeira.
- Poivrade – Diced vegetables with herbs, with demi-glace.
- Ravigote – Reduction of white wine and vinegar with velouté and shallot butter, garnished with herbs.
- Rémoulade – Mayonnaise seasoned with mustard and anchovy essence, garnished with chopped capers, gherkins, tarragon and chervil.
- Robert – Chopped onions in butter, with white wine, vinegar, pepper, cooked in demi-glace and finished with mustard.
- Rouennaise – Thin bordelaise mixed with puréed raw duck livers, gently cooked, finished with a reduction of red wine and shallots.
- Rouille – Garlic, pimento and chilli pepper sauce, traditionally served with fish soup.
- Soubise – Onion sauce. Versions include (i) béchamel and cooked chopped onions and (ii) onions and rice in white stock, reduced to paste and blended with butter and cream.
- Tartare – Cold sauce of mayonnaise with hard-boiled egg yolks, with onions and chives.
- Tomate – a tomato-based sauce.
- Velouté – white stock-based sauce, thickened with a roux or a liaison.
- Vénitienne – White wine with a reduction of tarragon vinegar, shallots and chervil, finished with butter.

=== Georgia ===
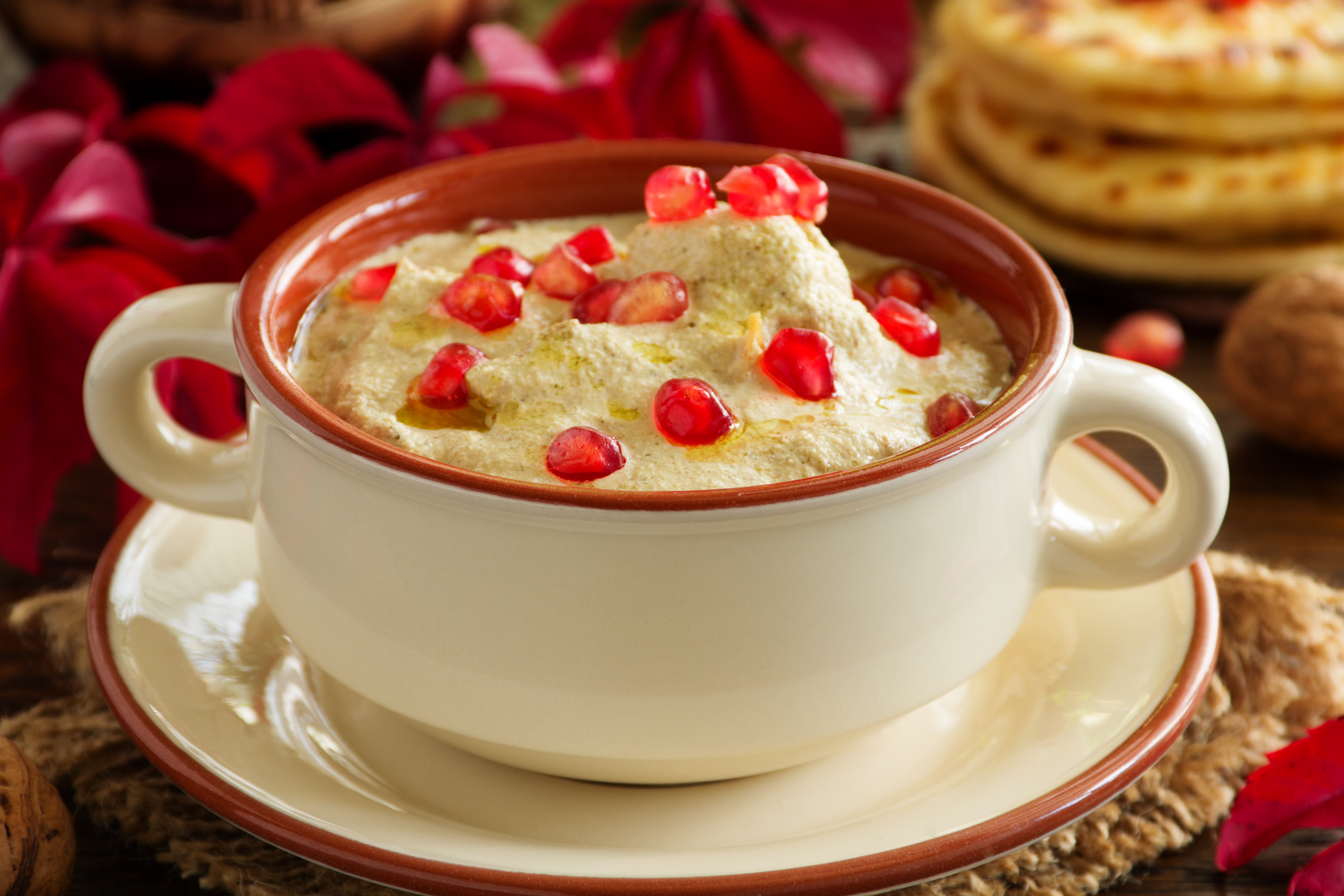
Chicken in satsivi sauce

Sauces in Georgian cuisine include:

- Ajika – Georgian dip
- Tkemali – Georgian plum sauce
- Satsebeli – Tomato sauce in Georgian cuisine

=== Germany ===
Sauces in German cuisine include:

- Currygewürzketchup – Sauce with curry powder
- Duckefett – Regional cuisine in Germany
- Frankfurt green sauce – Sauce made from chopped herbs

=== Greece ===
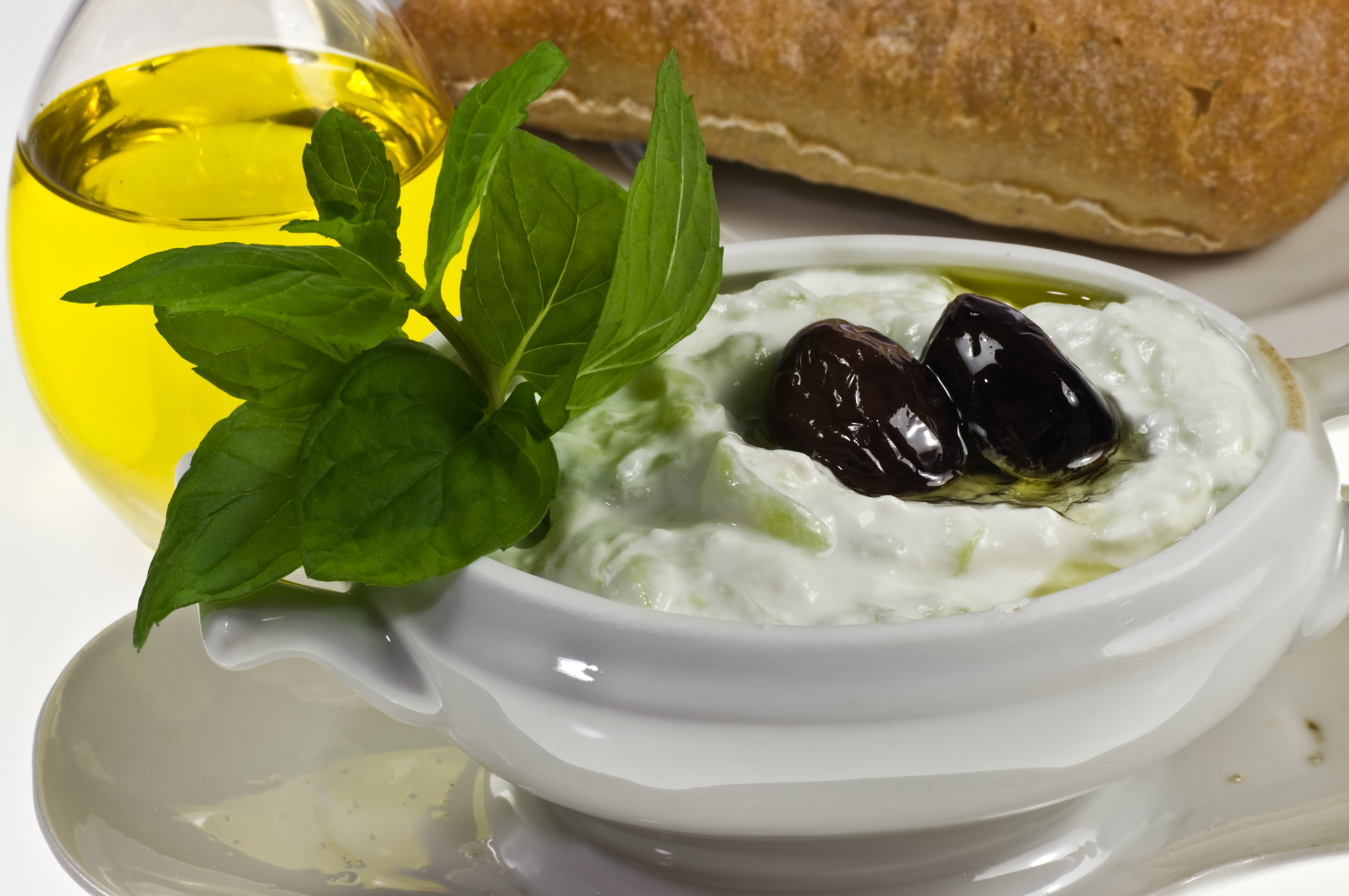
Tzatziki

Sauces in Greek cuisine include:

- Skordalia – Thick garlic sauce in Greek cuisine
- Tzatziki – Cold cucumber–yogurt dip, soup, or sauce
- Avgolemono – Egg-lemon sauce or soup
- Melitzanosalata
- Taramasalata – Roe-based meze common to Turkey and Greece

=== India ===
Sauces in Indian cuisine include:

- Coconut chutney (South India)
- Garlic chutney (South India)
- Mango Chutney (South India)
- Coriander (North India)
- Mint chutney (North India)
- Tomato chutney
- Imli (North India)
- Aloobukhara (North India)
- Khajoor (North India)

=== Indonesia ===
Sauces in Indonesian cuisine include:

- Dabu-dabu – Indonesian spicy condiment
- Colo-colo – Indonesian hot and spicy condiment
- Peanut sauce – Indonesian sauce made from ground roasted or fried peanuts
- Pecel – Indonesian vegetable dish
- Sambal – Southeast Asian spicy relish or sauce
- Sweet soy sauce – Sweetened aromatic soy sauce, originating from Java, Indonesia

=== Iran ===
Sauces in Iranian cuisine include:

- Mahyawa – Iranian cuisine tangy sauce made out of fermented fish

=== Italy ===
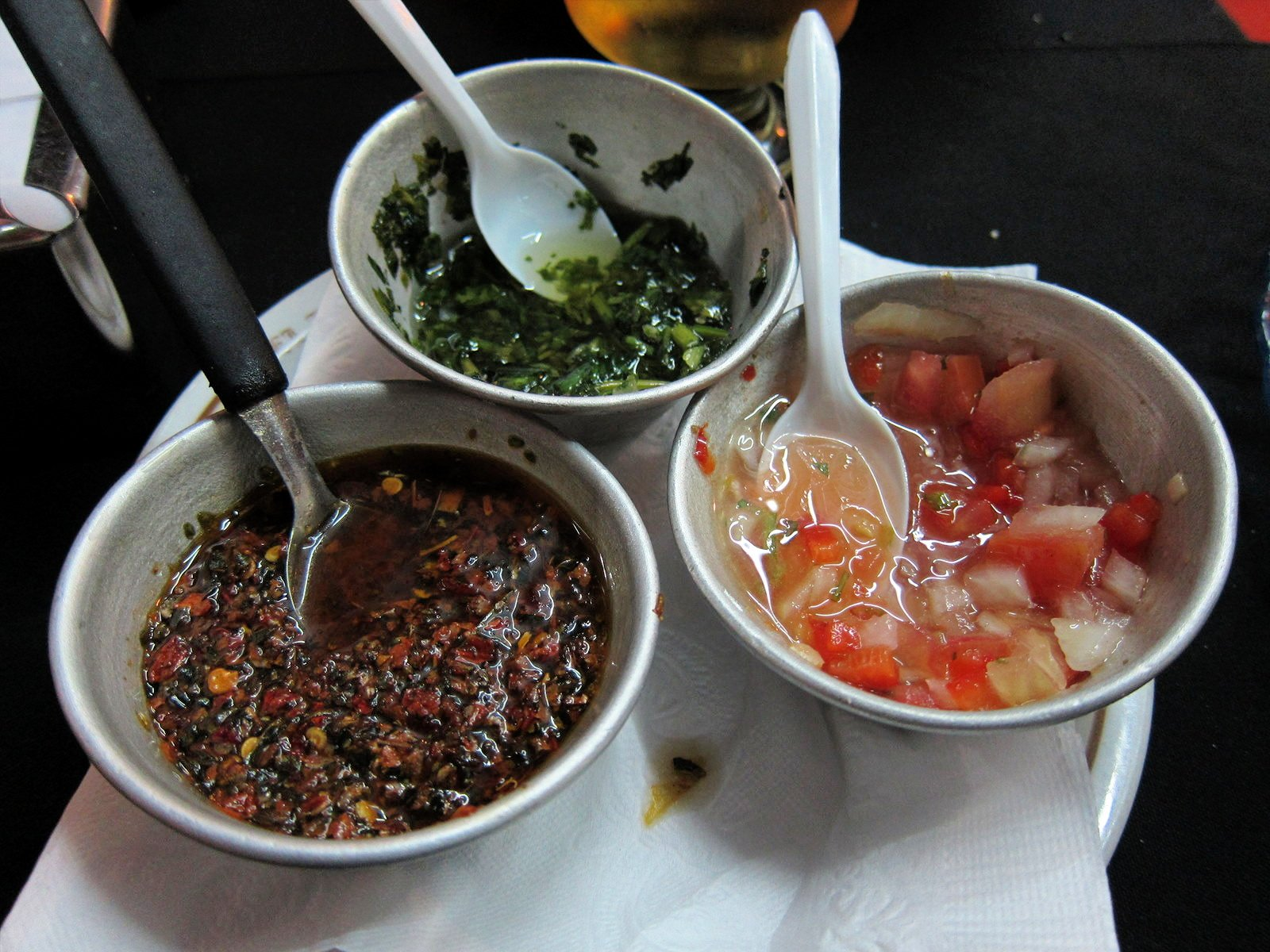
Sauces at a family run parilla (grill) in Palermo, Sicily

Sauces in Italian cuisine include:

- Agliata – Italian garlic sauce and condiment
- Agrodolce – Cooking method
- Amatriciana sauce – Italian pasta sauce
- Arrabbiata sauce – Italian pasta sauce
- Bolognese sauce – Main variety of ragù in Italian cuisine
- Genovese sauce – Meat-based Italian pasta sauce
- Neapolitan ragù – Meat-based sauce from Naples, Italy
- Pearà – Traditional Veronese sauce
- Pesto – Italian food paste
- Pesto alla trapanese – Sicilian variety of pesto
- Ragù – Meat-based sauce in Italian cuisine
- Ragù di salsiccia – Variety of ragù
- Sugo alla puttanesca

=== Israel ===
Sauces in Israeli cuisine include:

- Amba – a condiment using mango pickle popularised by Iraqi Jewish merchants in Bombay
- Pilpelchuma – a chili-garlic paste originating from Libyan Jews

=== Jamaica ===
Sauces in Jamaican cuisine include:

- Jerk sauce – Style of cooking native to Jamaica

=== Japan ===
Sauces in Japanese cuisine include:

- Shottsuru – Japanese fish sauce
- Tare sauce – Family of Japanese sauces
- Ponzu – Japanese citrus-based condiment
- Umeboshi paste – Sour pickled Japanese fruit, or Japanese pickled plum sauce
- Tonkatsu sauce – Japanese seasoning sauce

=== Korea ===
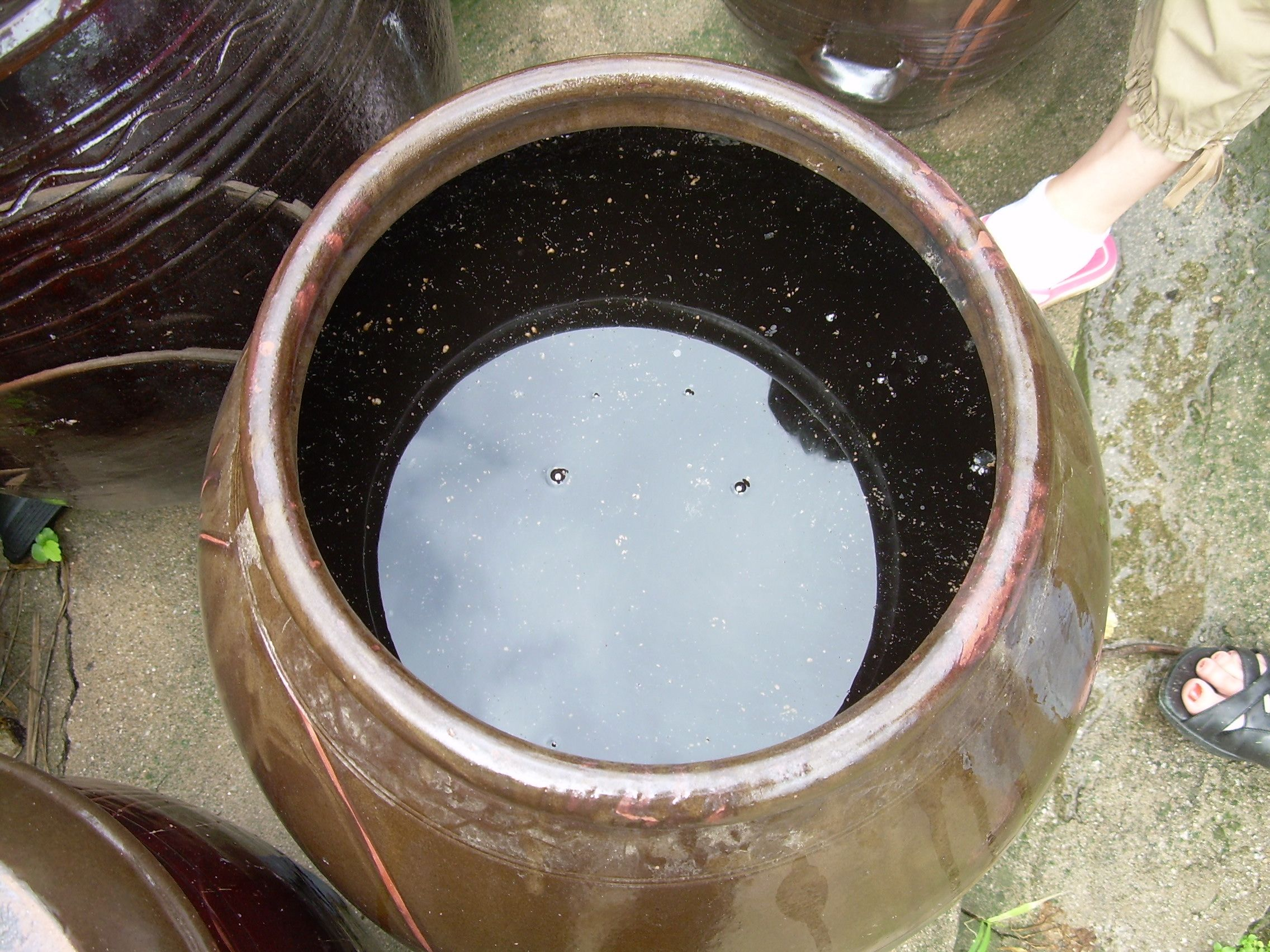
Traditional Korean soy sauce

Sauces in Korean cuisine include:

- Korean soy sauce – East Asian liquid condiment

=== Malaysia ===
Sauces in Malaysian cuisine include:

- Cincalok – Malay salted shrimp condiment

=== Mexico ===
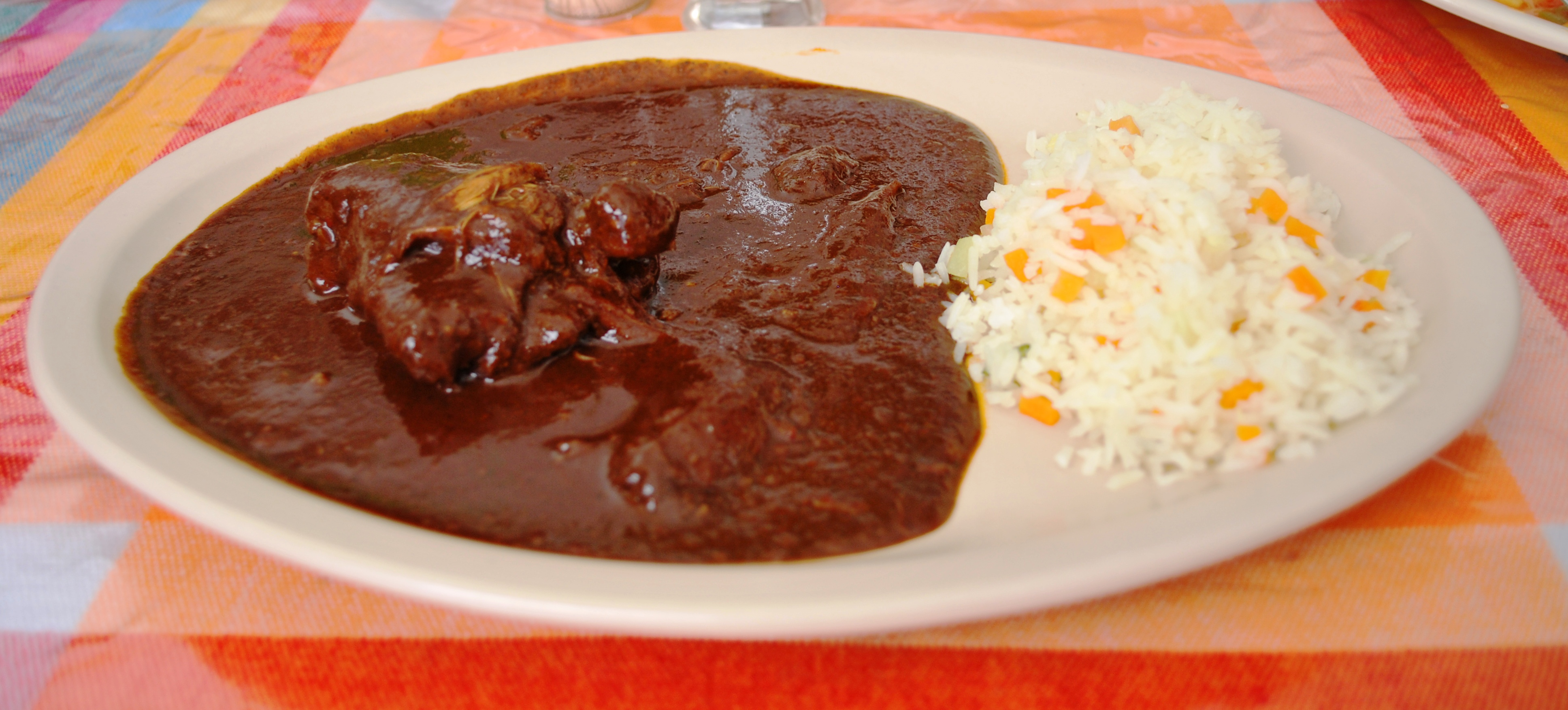
Chicken in a red mole sauce

Sauces in Mexican cuisine include:

- Guacamole – Mexican avocado-based dish
- Mole – Mexican sauce and marinade
- Pico de gallo – Mexican condiment
- Salsa macha
- Salsa Verde
- Xnipek – Spicy sauce native to Yucatán peninsula

=== Netherlands ===
Sauces in Dutch cuisine include:

- Fritessaus – Dutch condiment, usually served with French fries
- Joppiesaus – Type of sauce from the Netherlands

=== Peru ===
Sauces in Peruvian cuisine include:

- Huancaina – Peruvian appetizer
- Ocopa

=== Philippines ===
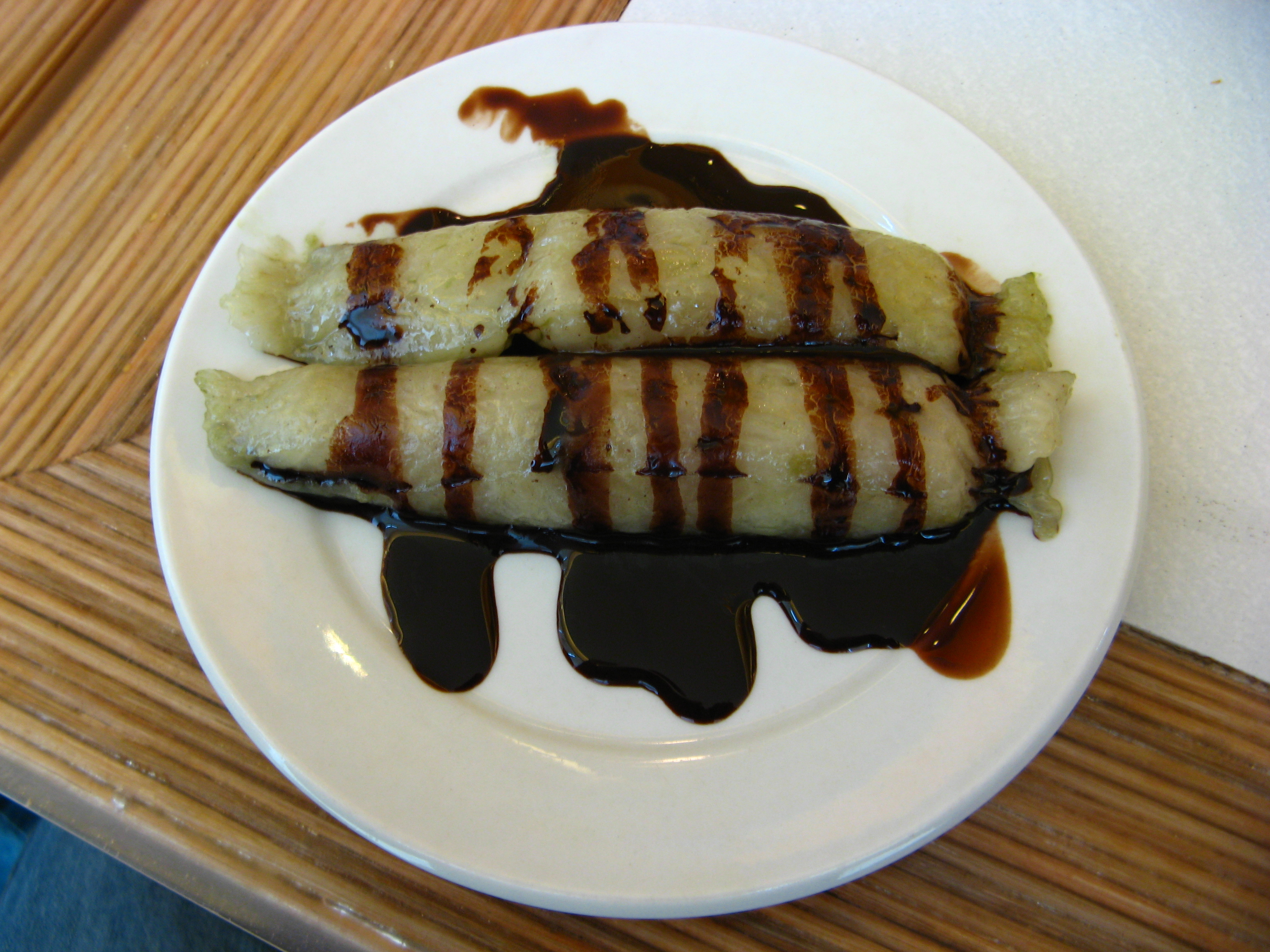
Cassava suman with Latik

Sauces in Filipino cuisine include:

- Bagoong – Type of Philippine condiment
- Banana ketchup – Sauce made from bananas
- Latik – Filipino dessert garnishing and condiment
- Liver sauce – Filipino condiment spread – used primarily as a dipping sauce for lechon or whole roasted pig. Flavour is savoury, sweet and piquant, vaguely reminiscent of British style brown sauces but with a coarser texture.

=== Poland ===
Sauces in Polish cuisine include:

- Ćwikła – Made of horseradish and cooked, minced beets. Very common during Easter. Served with various meats to eat with bread.
- Mizeria – Type of salad from Poland – A kefir or sour cream sauce or salad with thinly sliced cucumbers, sugar and herbs.
- Polonaise – Sauce in Polish cuisine – Garnish made of melted butter, chopped boiled eggs, bread crumbs, salt, lemon juice and herbs. In Poland it's usually used as a dressing, served with cooked vegetables like green beans, cauliflower, broccoli or Brussels sprouts next to potatoes and meat.
- Velouté à la polonaise – French sauce made from roux and light stock – A velouté sauce mixed with horseradish, lemon juice and sour cream.

=== Portugal ===
Sauces in Portuguese cuisine include:

- Cebolada – An onion sauce of Portuguese origin used for fish and game.
- Escabeche sauce – A vinegar-based sauce predominantly used for fish.
- Francesinha sauce – Portuguese sandwich – A red or orange sauce, often tomato-based, that includes beer along with a variety of other possible ingredients.

=== Puerto Rico ===
Sauces in Puerto Rican cuisine include:

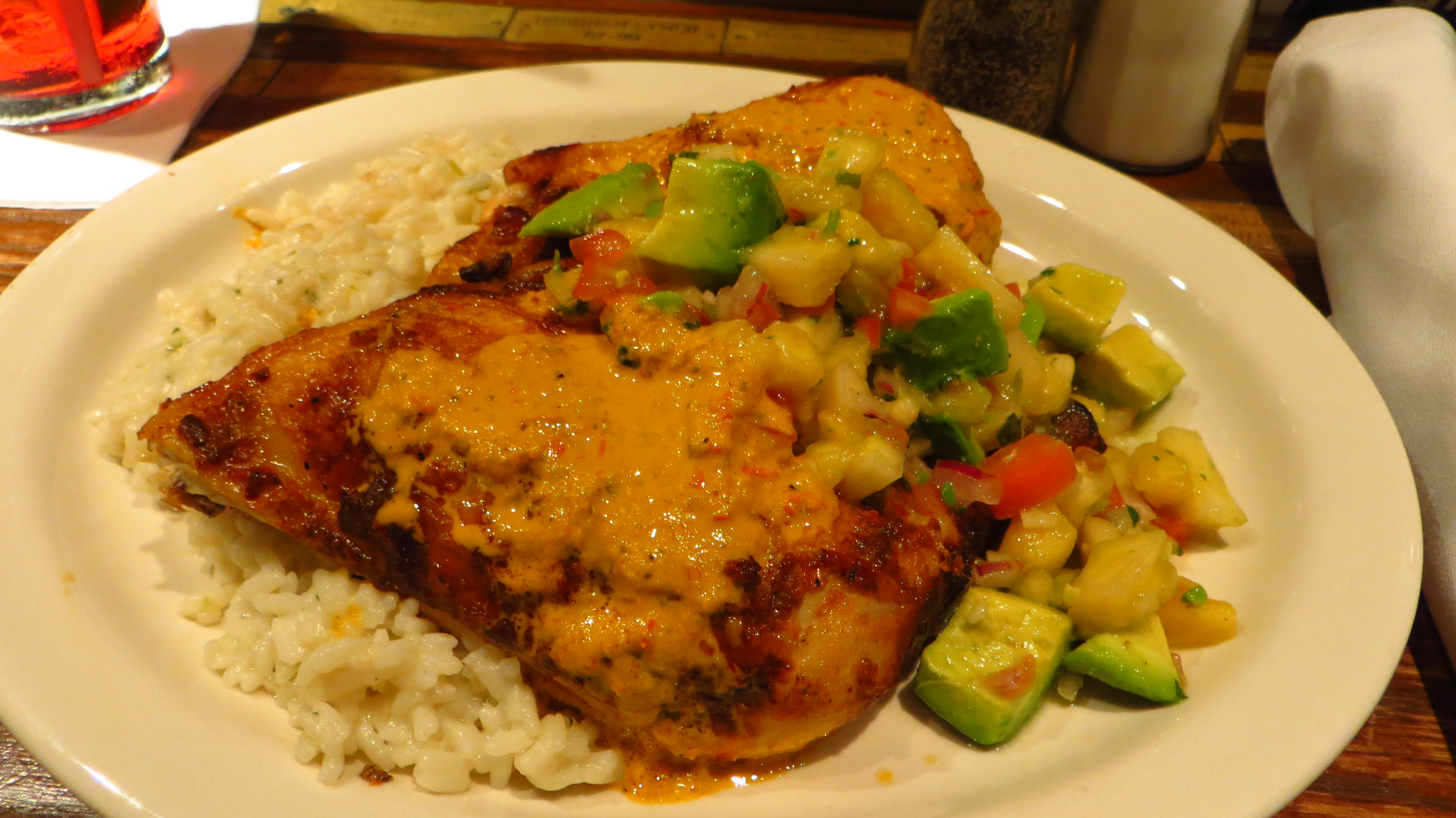
Chicken with Ajilimójili, rice, and salsa

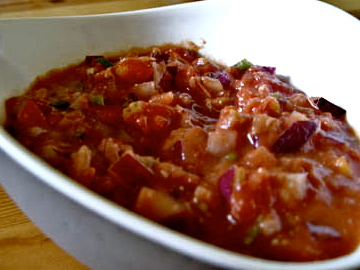
Mojito Isleño

- Adobo Mojado – Iberian culinary style
- Ajilimójili – Chili sauce from Puerto Rico
- Escabeche – Ibero-American fish, meat or vegetable dish Sauce –Pickling sauce made with chili, garlic, herbs, and vinegar primarily used for green banana, onions, root vegetables, chicken gizzard, and fish
- Ají de leche de coco – Spicy thick coconut milk and lime sauce
- Marie Rose sauce – British condiment – The sauce is made with sofrito, chilies, ketchup, sour orange, Worcestershire sauce, and mayonnaise
- Mojito Isleño – Puerto Rican condiment
- Mojo Criollo – Several types of sauces
- Pique – Puerto Rican hot sauce
- Pique Verde – Puerto Rican green hot sauce
- Recaíto – Cooking base made of pureed aromatics
- Sofrito – Cooked vegetable foundation for cooking

=== Romania ===
Sauces in Romanian cuisine include:

- Mujdei – Romanian garlic and vegetable oil sauce

=== Russia ===
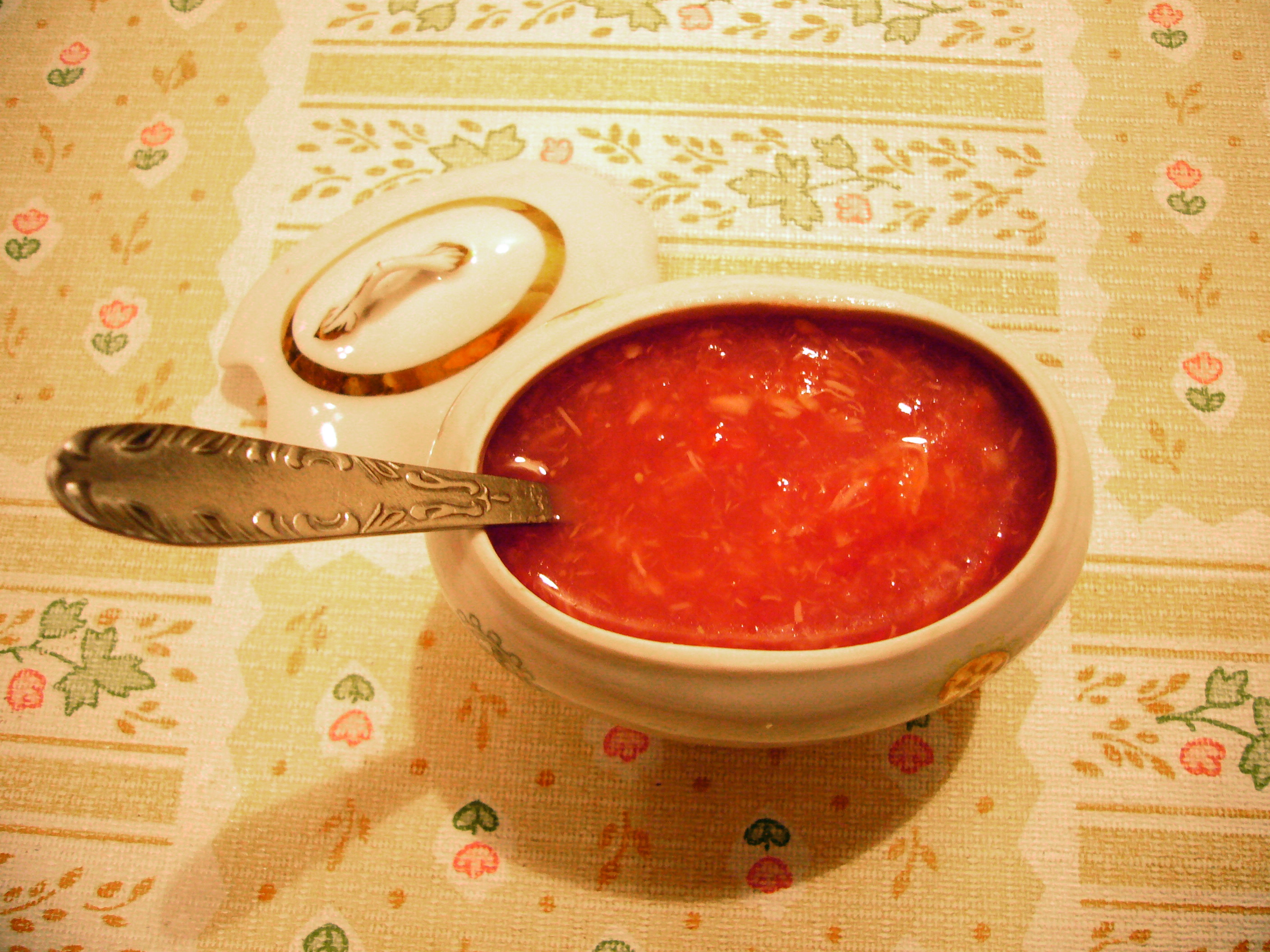
Khrenovina sauce, a spicy horseradish sauce originating from Siberia

Sauces in Russian cuisine include:

- Khrenovina sauce – Spicy horseradish sauce

=== Spain ===
Sauces in Spanish cuisine include:

==== Canary Islands ====
Sauces used in the cuisine of the Canary Islands include:

- Mojo – Several types of sauces

==== Catalonia ====
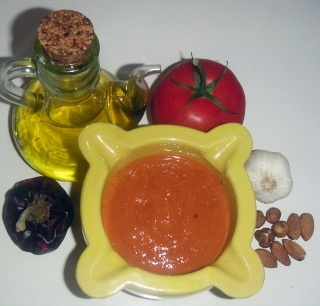
Romesco ingredients and sauce

Sauces in Catalan cuisine include:

- Salvitxada – Sauce from Catalan cuisine
- Xató – Sauce in Catalan cooking
- Romesco – Catalan sauce of tomatoes, garlic, and nuts
- Alioli – Mediterranean sauce made of garlic and olive oil, optionally egg yolks and seasonings

=== Sweden ===
Sauces in Swedish cuisine include:

- Brunsås – Sauce made with brown meat stock

=== Switzerland ===
Sauces in Swiss cuisine include:

- Café de Paris sauce – Butter-based sauce – a butter-based sauce served with grilled beef

=== Thailand ===
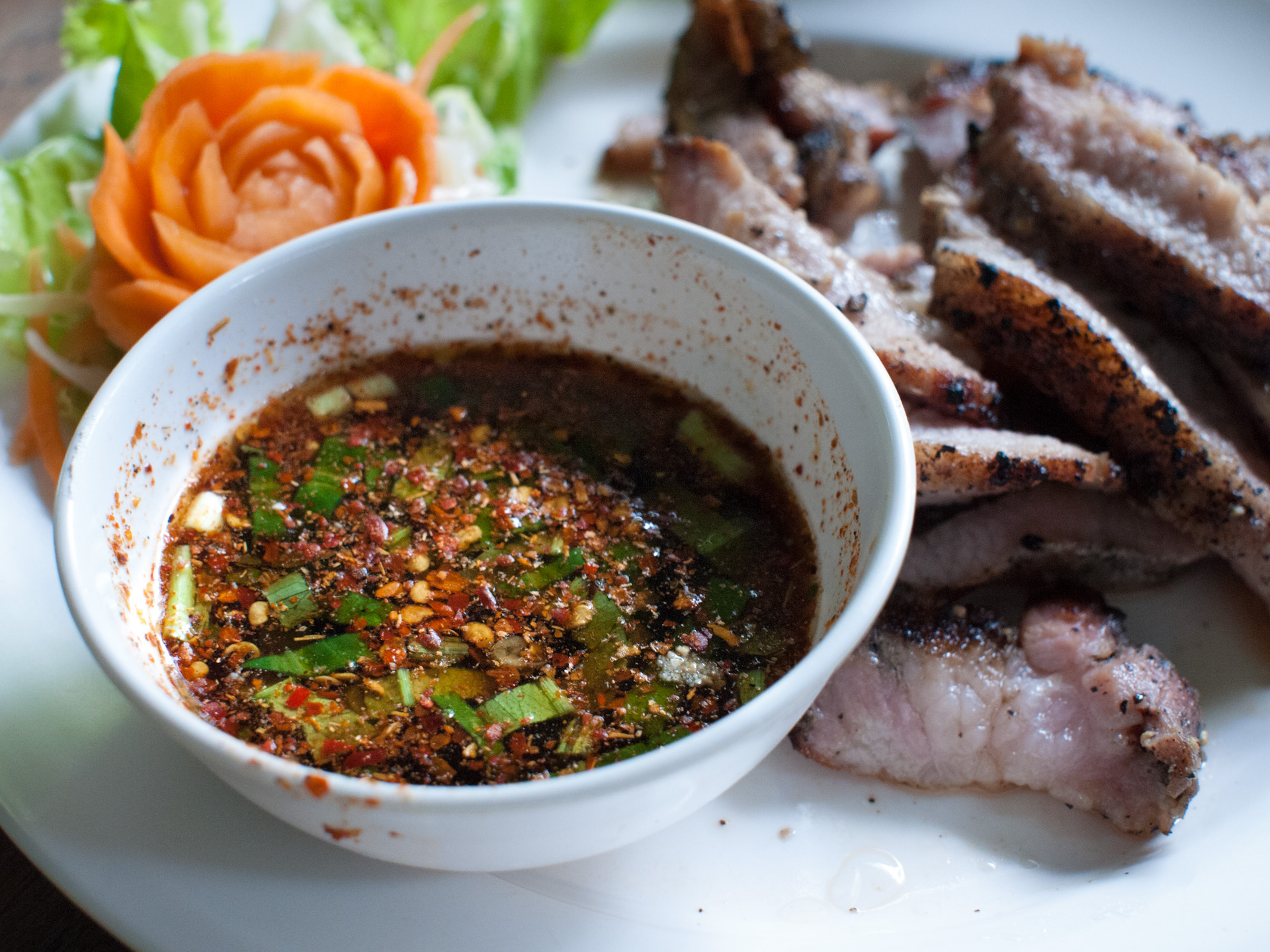
Nam chim chaeo sauce

Sauces in Thai cuisine include:

- Nam chim – Thai sauce
- Nam phrik – Thai chili sauce
- Sriracha sauce – Thai hot sauce
- Sweet chili sauce – Condiment primarily used as a dip

=== United Kingdom ===
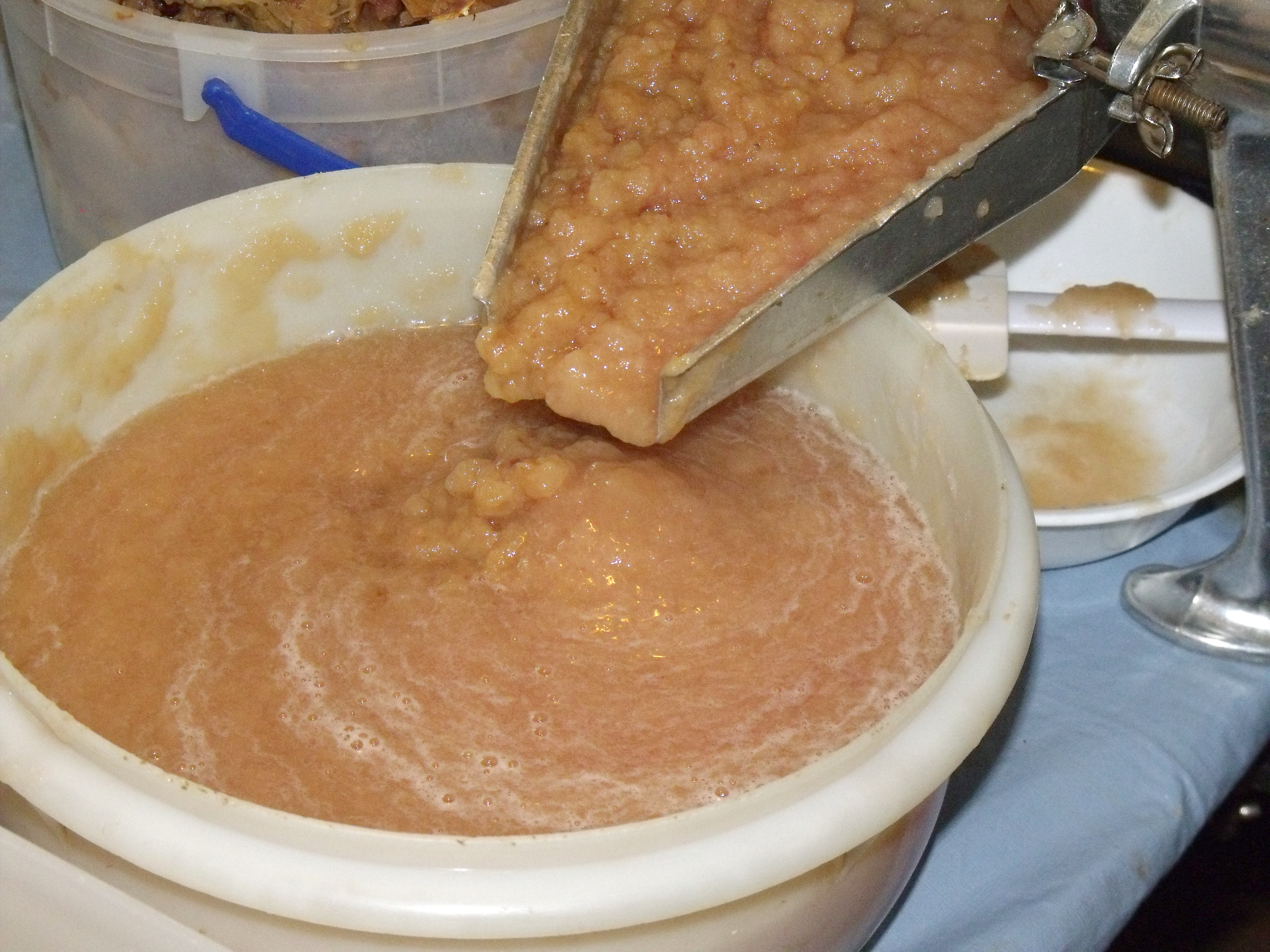
Homemade apple sauce being prepared

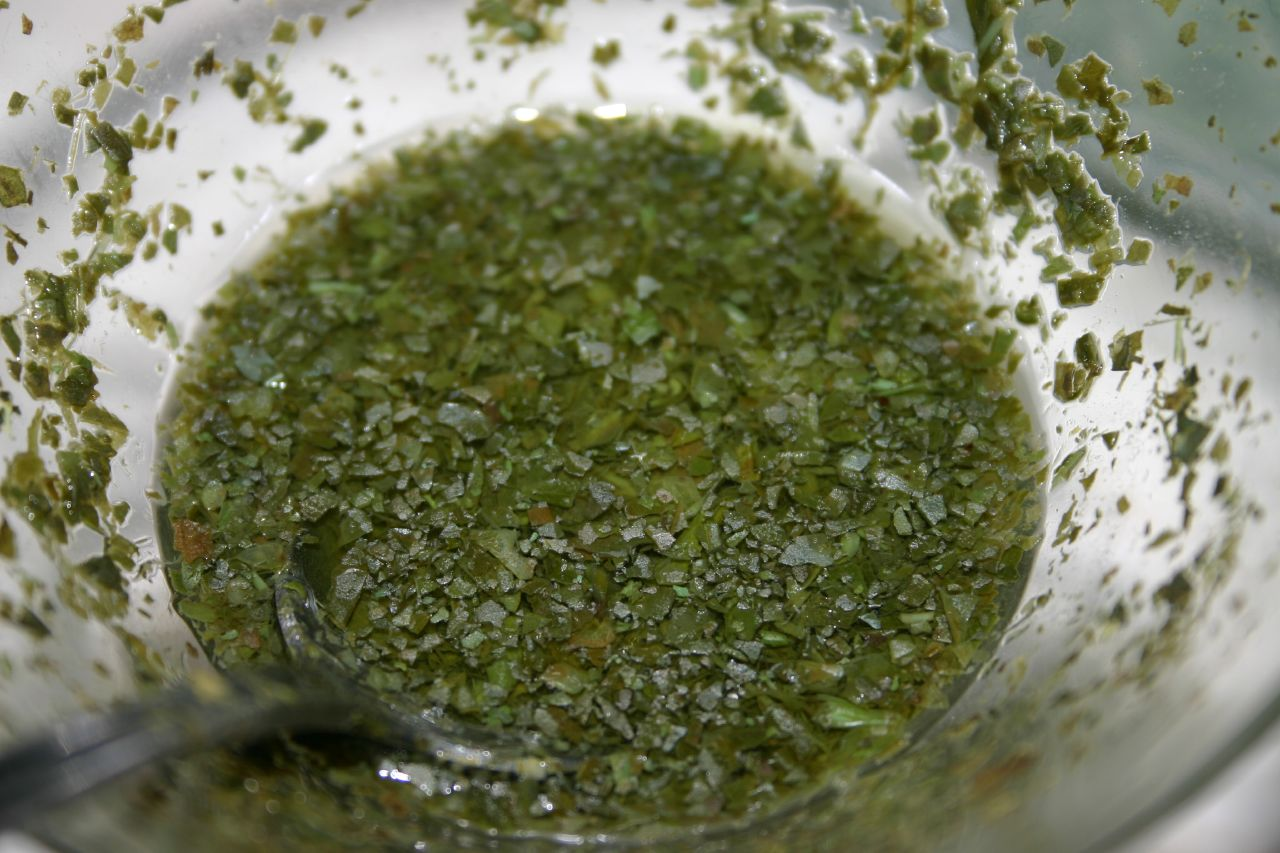
Mint sauce

Sauces in British cuisine include:

- Albert sauce
- Apple sauce – Purée made from apples
- Bread sauce – Sauce made with milk and bread crumbs
- Brown sauce – Type of condiment
- Cheddar sauce – British sauce made with cheddar cheese
- Cumberland sauce – Redcurrant-based condiment (Oxford sauce)
- Gravy – Sauce made from the juices of meats
- Henderson's Relish -- Spicy table sauce from Yorkshire
- Horseradish sauce – Species of flowering plant
- Marie Rose sauce – British condiment
- Mint sauce – Sauce made of chopped mint
- Mushroom sauce – White or brown sauce prepared with mushrooms
- Onion gravy – Type of sauce
- Parsley sauce – Cream sauce seasoned with parsley
- Redcurrant sauce – English condiment
- Shrewsbury sauce – English savoury sauce
- Tewkesbury mustard – Type of mustard
- Whisky sauce – Scottish whisky-based sauce
- White sauce – French white sauce based on roux and milk
- Worcestershire sauce – English fermented condiment
- Wow-Wow sauce, also known as Bow Wow Sauce

=== United States ===
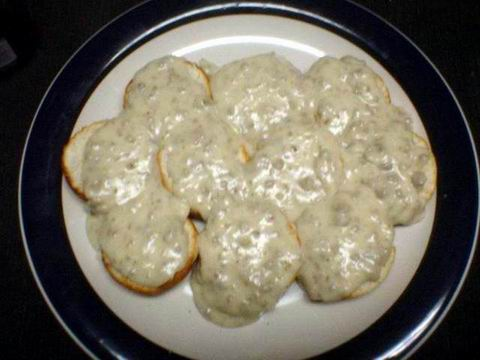
Sausage gravy served atop biscuits

Sauces in the cuisine of the United States include:

- Alfredo sauce – Creamy pasta dish with butter and cheese
- Barbecue sauce – Sauce used as a marinade, basting, or topping
- Brown gravy – Sauce made from the juices of meats
- Buffalo sauce – American dish of spicy chicken wings
- Cincinnati chili – Spiced meat sauce used as a topping for spaghetti
- Coffee sauce – Culinary sauce that includes coffee
- Comeback sauce – Sauce for fried food from Mississippi
- Coney sauce – American fast food item
- Cranberry sauce – Sauce made from cranberries
- Cream cheese – Soft, mild-tasting cheese with a high fat content
- Duck sauce – Dip for Chinese-style duck dishes
- Étouffée sauce – American seafood and rice dish
- Henry Bain sauce – American condiment for meats
- Huli-huli sauce – Hawaiian chicken dish
- Lobster sauce – Sauce in North American Chinese cuisine
- Mumbo sauce – American regional sauce
- Michigan sauce – Style of hot dog
- Old Sour – Fermented key lime juice used in sauces
- Red-eye gravy – Type of gravy
- Remoulade – Mayonnaise-based cold sauce
- Sausage gravy – Breakfast dish from the Southern United States
- Tomato sauce – Sauce made primarily from tomatoes
- Vodka sauce – Pasta dish with vodka, cream, and tomato sauce

=== Uruguay ===
Sauces in the cuisine of Uruguay include:

- Caruso sauce – Cream sauce for pasta

=== Vietnam ===
Dipping sauces are a mainstay of many Vietnamese dishes. Some of the commonly used sauces are:

- Mắm tôm – Fermented condiment - Fermented shrimp sauce
- Nước chấm – Vietnamese dipping sauce
- Tương – Condiment made from soybeans - fermented bean paste

== See also ==
- Chutney – South Asian condiment
- Compound butter – Butter mixed with other ingredients
- Condiment – Substance added to food for flavour
- Deglazing (cooking) – Cooking technique to create a sauce
- Dipping sauce – Type of condiment
- List of dips – Type of condiment
- Fermented bean paste – Fermented foods made from ground soybeans
- Fondue – Swiss melted cheese dish
- Gastrique – Caramelized sugar, deglazed with vinegar
- List of condiments
- List of dessert sauces
- List of fish sauces
- List of hot sauces
- List of mayonnaises
- List of meat-based sauces
- List of syrups
- Marination – Process of soaking foods in a seasoned, often acidic, liquid before cooking
- Outline of food preparation – Overview of and topical guide to food preparation
- Reduction (cooking) – Cooking process
- Relish – Condiment made from cooked pickled vegetables, fruit or herbs
- Sauce boat – Low lipped vessel in which sauce is served
- Saucery – Medieval office of sauce preparation
- Saucier – Type of chef
- Soup – Primarily liquid food
- Spread (food) – Food that is spread onto bread
- Sweet bean paste – Bean paste used in Asian cuisines
