= Genevoise sauce =

Type of sauce

Genevoise sauce or Geneva sauce is a type of French brown sauce made from fish fumet, mirepoix, red wine, and butter, usually accompanying fatty fishes such as trout and salmon. Some versions use white wine instead of red wine.

The sauce was originally made from the braising liquid from dishes prepared "à la genevoise" popular during Marie-Antoine Carême's time. One of the first recipes for the sauce was given by the eighteenth-century French chef and writer Louis Eustache Ude, who used white wine instead of red wine.

This sauce was later further popularized by the French chef and writer Auguste Escoffier in Le guide culinaire.

== Preparation ==
Fish bones (ideally salmon heads) and mirepoix are first sautéed in butter. The pot is then deglazed with red wine and reduced by half. Fish fumet is then added and simmered for about 40 minutes. The sauce is then finished with cold knobs of butter.

== See also ==
- French cuisine
- Sauce Espagnol
- French mother sauces
- Velouté sauce
- Sauce Bercy
- Fish fumet
- Brown stock
- Demi-glace
