= List of French omelettes =

The Dictionnaire de l’Académie française defines the word "omelette" as "A dish consisting of whole eggs beaten and cooked in a pan in butter or oil, to which various ingredients can be added". There are two basic types of French omelette: folded and flat. Omelettes fourées may be filled with various mixtures before being folded. Flat omelettes, omelettes plates, are served unfolded and resemble a thick pancake. In both cases, other ingredients may be added to the raw egg mix before it is cooked.

The Dictionnaire dates the word "omelette" to the fourteenth century and says that it comes from words derived from the Latin ovum, "egg" and alumella diminutive of "blade", because of the shape of a typical folded omelette. By the seventeenth century, French cooks had invented a large number of variants of the basic omelette; François Pierre La Varenne, the author of Le Pastissier françois (1653), set out a large number of recipes for "aumelettes", most of which were translated into English by Robert May (1660).

Some French omelettes are named after places, such as Boulogne, Burgundy, Dieppe, Rouen and many others. Some share the names of notable people – mostly French – including Agnès Sorel, Georges Feydeau, Louis XIV and Sarah Bernhardt.

English	French	Contents	Ref
African-style	À l'africaine	With tomatoes concassées, mixed with softened onions, rice and chopped ham	
Agnès Sorel	Agnès Sorel	With chicken purée, mixed with sliced mushrooms, garnished with slices of ox tongue, served with a border of gravy	
Albina	Albina	Chopped truffles in the egg mix; thick chicken purée added to the cooked omelette before folding	
Algerian-style	À l'algérienne	With chopped softened onions, peppers and tomatoes	
Alsace-style	À l'alsaciene	Fried in goose fat and filled with sauerkraut	
American-style	À l'américaine	Diced fried bacon in the mixture, stuffed with tomatoes concassées	
Anchovies	Aux anchois	Eggs mixed with chopped desalted anchovy fillets, surrounded with anchovy sauce or demi-glace	
Andalusian-style	À l'andalouse	With diced tomatoes red peppers and mushrooms, garnished with fried onion	
André Theuriet	André-Theuriet	Filled with asparagus and mushrooms in cream	
Archduke	À l'archiduc	With fried chicken livers in Madeira sauce, garnished with truffle slices, served with archduke sauce (sauce suprême with mushrooms)	
Argenteuil-style	Argenteuil	With white or green asparagus tips	
Argentine-style	À l'argentine	With diced aubergine, served with a border of tomato sauce	
Arles	À la belle arlésienne	With cod purée seasoned with garlic and mixed with olive oil coated with tomato sauce mixed with diced fried aubergines	
Artichoke hearts	Aux fonds d'artichauts	Diced or thinly sliced artichoke hearts are added to the egg mix; demi-glace poured around the finished dish	
Asparagus tips	Aux pointes d'asperges	With asparagus tips or stuffed with creamed asparagus tips	
Aubergines	Aux aubergines	With diced aubergines	
Bacon	Au lard or Au bacon	Egg mixture poured over diced fried bacon, omelette finished off in the usual way.	
Basque-style	Basquaise	Piperade is added to the cooked omelette before serving	
Belloy	Belloy	With diced fried eelpout livers, served with anchovy sauce	
Benedictine	Bénédictine	With creamed purée of salt cod mixed with chopped truffles, served with a border of suprême sauce	
Beranger	Beranger	With tomatoes concassées, mixed with diced fried bacon and chopped herbs, tomato sauce poured around the edge	
Bercy-style	À la Bercy	Chopped herbs are added to the egg mix; the omelette is garnished with chipolata sausages	
Berry-style	Berrichonne	Whites of leeks, shallot, mint and cream are added to the egg mix	
Bertrand	Bertrand	With creamed chicken mixed with chopped truffles, garnished with thin slices of chicken and truffles coated with hollandaise sauce blended with mushroom essence	
Black pudding	Au boudin de Nancy	À layer of sliced and cooked black pudding and shallots, served sandwiched between two plain omelettes	
Boulogne-style	À la boulonnaise	With diced fried mackerel, served with parsley butter	
Brayaude	Brayaude	From Riom in the Auvergne: with salt pork and potato	
Breton-style	À la bretonne	Chopped leeks, onions and mushrooms are added to the egg mixture	
Brillat Savarin	Brillat Savarin	salmis sauce, garnished with sliced truffles	
Brocciu	Au brocciu	Made with Corsican ewe-cheese and chopped mint	
Brussels-style (1)	À la bruxelloise	With creamed shredded endives, cream sauce poured around	
Brussels-style (2)	À la bruxelloise	Small Brussels sprouts are parboiled and added to the egg mix.	
Burgundy-style	À la bourguignonne	With chopped stewed snails and chopped parsley in the omelette mixture	
Butcher-style	À la bouchere or À la charcutière	Egg mixture, mixed with diced fried bacon and diced sausage, surrounded with mustard sauce	
Calf's brains	Au cervelle de veau	With diced calf's brain in Madeira sauce	
Canino	Canino	Egg mixture mixed with chopped onions, diced morels and garlic sausage fried in oil and mixed with chopped parsley	
Cardinal P.	Cardinal P	Omelette of plover eggs stuffed with salpicon of lobster and truffles in creamed veal gravy coated with cheese sauce, blended with lobster butter sprinkled with grated cheese and grilled rapidly	
Carp roes	Aux laitances de carpe	With diced soft roes that have been gently cooked in claret	
Catalonian	À la catalane	With diced tomatoes concassées, green peppers and diced fried potatoes and aubergines, all mixed together	
Cèpes	Aux cèpes	Mixed or stuffed with sliced cèpes fluted with chopped shallots, a border of thick gravy poured around the omelette	
Châlons-style	À la chalonnaise	With cockscombs and cocks' kidneys in cream sauce, surrounded with suprême sauce	
Chambéry-style	À la Chambéry	Egg mixture mixed with diced leeks, bacon, potatoes and cheese	
Chambord-style	À la Chambord	With soft roe purée surrounded with Chambord sauce	
Chartres-style	À la Chartres	Egg mixture mixed with chopped tarragon demi-glace mixed with chopped tarragon poured around	
Châtelaine-style (1)	À la Châtelaine	Stuffed with cooked chestnuts in meat glaze, with suprême sauce with onion	
Châtelaine-style (2)	À la Châtelaine	With slices and dice of truffle and artichoke hearts	
Cheese	Au fromage	Parmesan and Gruyère are added to the egg mix	
Cherbourg-style	À la cherbourgeoise	With shrimps, and garnished with more shrimps; shrimp sauce poured around	
Chicken livers	Aux foies de volaille	Sautéed chicken livers and chopped parsley are added to the egg mix	
Choisy	Choisy	With creamed shredded lettuce, served with a cream sauce	
Clamart	Clamart	With peas cooked à la française (traditionally with lettuce and button onions in cream)	
Cluny	Cluny	With game purée and a border of tomato sauce	
Continental-style	À la continentale	Chopped chives in the egg mixture, stuffed with diced fried potatoes and cepes, surrounded with demi-glace	
Courgette flower	Fleurs de courge	Stuffed with courgette flowers fried in butter, with chopped parsley	
Cracovian	À la cracovienne	With diced fried sweet potatoes mixed with bread crumbs	
Crayfish	Aux écrevisses	With salpicon of crayfish tails, border of Nantua sauce poured around	
Crécy	Crécy	Stuffed with carrot purée, served with suprême sauce	
Creole-style	À la Creole	Plain omelette, surrounded with Creole sauce	
Crevette	Crevette	Stuffed with shrimp tails and shrimp sauce	
Czech-style	À la tchèque	With short strips of ham and truffle in cream sauce, and the same sauce poured around the omelette	
Demidoff	Demidoff	With diced or puréed artichoke bottoms, garnished with slices of blanched marrow, covered with demi-glace	
Des jardins	Des jardins	With tomatoes concassées mixed with diced anchovy fillets and mushrooms, a border of Colbert sauce around the dish	
Dieppe-style	À la dieppoise	With salpicon of mussels and shrimps, surrounded with white wine sauce	
Diocletian	Dioclétien	With creamed lettuce purée, surrounded with velouté sauce	
Diplomat-style	Diplomate	With diced artichoke bottoms and truffles in truffle sauce	
Doria	Doria	With diced cucumber in velouté sauce with grated white Italian truffles	
Dretschina	Dretschina	Eggs beaten with milk, a little flour, cream, salt and pepper, cooked on both sides, arranged flat on a round dish, covered with brown butter	
Du Barry	Du Barry	Fried cauliflower florets and chopped chervil are added to the egg mix	
Durand	Durand	Egg mixture mixed with thinly sliced mushrooms and artichoke bottoms seared in butter, stuffed with asparagus tips and truffles in suprême sauce, with a border of demi-glace tomatoes poured around the edge	
Duse	Duse	Garnished with calf's brain and crayfish tails in Madeira sauce	
Dutch	Hollandaise	Egg mixture mixed with strips of smoked salmon sautéed in butter, a border of hollandaise sauce poured around	
Egyptian-style	À l'égyptienne	Eggs mixed with tomato purée, stuffed with saffron rice, tomato sauce poured around	
Farmer-style	À la paysanne	Eggs mixed with shredded sorrel, diced fried bacon and potatoes, served flat like a pancake	
Farmhouse-style	À la fermière	Beaten eggs mixed with small thin slices of carrots, onions and celery and chopped parsley, poured over diced ham fried In butter; omelette served flat on a round dish	
Favourite-style	À la favorite	With creamed asparagus tips and chopped ham, garnished with truffle slices, a border of cream sauce poured around	
Feydeau	Feydeau	Omelette stuffed with mushroom purée and garnished with small soft-poached eggs and Mornay sauce.	
Field fungi	Aux mousserons	With small field fungi; surrounded with Madeira sauce	
Field mushrooms	Aux chanterelles	With chopped fried field mushrooms; surrounded with cream sauce	
Fine herbs	Aux fines herbes	Omelette mixture mixed with chopped herbs (parsley, tarragon chervil, chives etc)	
Fishmonger-style	À la poissonnière	With salpicon of white fish, white wine sauce poured around	
Florentine	À la florentine	Eggs are mixed with blanched spinach leaves	
Forester-style	À la forestière	With sliced morels and boletus mixed with buttered meat glaze, border of thick veal gravy	
Foulard	Foulard	Egg whites beaten to snow mixed with the double amount of egg yolks and chopped fine herbs, seasoned with salt and pepper and baked	
Francis Joseph	François-Joseph	With diced chicken and mushrooms in paprika sauce, coated with cheese sauce, sprinkled with grated Parmesan cheese and glazed under the salamander	
French-style	À la française	Egg mixture mixed with whipped cream and chopped stewed shallots	
Frothy omelette	Omelette mousseline	Stiffly beaten egg whites mixed with egg yolks and a little whipped cream, seasoned with salt and pepper, baked in the oven, served open, not folded together	
Gardener-style	À la Jardinière	With mixed diced vegetables in cream sauce, a trickle of demi-glace around the edge	
Gascony-style	À la gasconne	Fried onions and ham are added to the egg mix with garlic and parsley.	
Genoese	Farinada genovese	Thin flat omelettes made of eggs, chickpea flour, water and salt, baked in hot oven.	
Gipsy	À la zingara	With tomatoes concassées, mixed with strips of ham, mushrooms and truffles, a border of demi-glace tomato	
Goby fish	Aux nonats	With the fried young of a small Mediterranean goby fried like whitebait	
Gordon	Gordon	Egg mixture mixed with diced parboiled ox marrow and truffles, garnished with slices of truffles and blanched ox marrow; border of Chateaubriand sauce	
Gounod	Gounod	Filled with diced fried sweetbread in truffle sauce; surrounded with truffle sauce	
Grandmother-style	Grand'mère	Omelette mixture mixed with croutons fried in butter and chopped parsley	
Gravy	Aux jus	Plain omelette with veal gravy poured around	
Greek-style	À la greque	With minced mutton, onions and peppers	
Greengrocer-style	À la verdurière	With sliced lettuce, sorrel, parsley, chervil and tarragon	
Grimaldi	Grimaldi	Purée of crayfish mixed with the omelette mixture, stuffed with salpicon of crayfish	
Guildford	Guildford	With stewed chopped morels and red peppers in white wine sauce	
Ham	Au jambon	Egg mixture, mixed with chopped boiled ham	
Harlequin	Arlequin	Four small omelettes one plain, one mixed with spinach, one with tomato purée and one with chopped truffles, not folded, placed one on top of the other, surrounded with a cordon of demi-glace	
Havana	À la havanaise	With fried chicken livers diced green peppers and tomatoes; a border of tomato sauce	
Hop shoots	Aux jets de houblon	With creamed hop shoots, an incision in the centre of the omelette, which is filled with hop shoots, cream sauce poured around	
Housewife's style (1)	À la ménagère	Cooked macaroni is added to the egg mix	
Housewife's-style (2)	Bonne femme	Egg mixture mixed with diced fried bacon, fried slices of onions and mushrooms	
Hungarian	À la hongroise	With chopped onions cooked in butter, mixed with diced ham, served with cream sauce flavoured with paprika	
Hunter-style	À la chasseur	With sautéed chicken livers and sliced mushrooms in demi-glace the incision filled with the same mixture, Hunter sauce poured around	
Imperial	À Impériale	With diced goose liver and truffles In Madeira sauce	
Indian	À l'indienne	With curry rice mixed with stewed chopped onions, surrounded with curry sauce	
Italian	À l'italienne	With risotto mixed with diced tomatoes surrounded with tomato sauce	
Jessica	Jessica	With sliced morels and asparagus tips in cream sauce, garnished with bouquets of morels and asparagus tips, a trickle of Chateaubriand sauce poured around	
Kidneys	Aux rognons	With diced sautéed kidneys in Port or Madeira sauce	
Lafontaine	Lafontaine	Mixture with grated cheese, stuffed with diced truffles and tomatoes in Madeira sauce	
Landes-style	Landaise	With pine nuts	
Little duke	Petit-duc	With boletus or mushrooms surrounded with Chateaubriand sauce	
Lobster	À l'homard	With diced cooked lobster and lobster sauce	
Lorraine	Lorraine	Diced bacon and Gruyère added to the egg mix	
Lott	Lott	With truffle purée, served surrounded with Madeira sauce	
Louis Forest	Louis Forest	With diced truffles and foie gras	
Louis XIV	Louis XIV	With chopped chicken and truffles in cream sauce, the same sauce poured around	
Lucerne	À la lucernoise	Mixed with diced fried rye bread, rooked on both sides and served flat (Swiss)	
Lyon-style	À la lyonnalse	Sliced onions, fried in butter, are added to the egg mixture	
Maintenon	Maintenon	Stuffed with sliced chicken, truffles and mushrooms, covered in béchamel sauce	
Manceile	Manceile	With chestnut purée mixed with strips of partridge, game sauce poured around	
Maria	Maria	Egg mixture mixed with chopped braised onions and fine herbs, the same mixture filled in the incision, white onion sauce poured around	
Marseille-style	À la marseillaise	With purée of salted cod mixed with tomatoes concassées, surrounded with Mantua sauce	
Masséna	Masséna	With diced artichoke bottom in tomato sauce, garnished with blanched slices of ox marrow slightly coated with buttered meat glace, border of Bearnaise sauce	
Maxim	Maxim	Plain omelette garnished with slices of truffle and crayfish tails on top, surrounded with sautéed frog legs	
Mazarin	Mazarin	With sliced fried chipolatas and mushrooms in Madeira sauce	
Médicis	Médicis	With diced roast fieldfare, truffles and morels bound with demi-glace, chasseur sauce poured around the omelette	
Meissonier	Meissonier	With diced carrots and turnips in cream sauce; surrounded with the same sauce	
Metz-style	À la messinoise	Strips of smoked sausage in the egg mixture, stuffed with sauerkraut surrounded with demi-glace	
Mexican	À la mexicaine	Strips of sweet peppers and diced mushrooms in the egg mixture, stuffed with tomatoes concassées, surrounded with demi-glace tomato	
Milanese	À la milanaise	With macaroni cut in small pieces and mixed with grated Parmesan cheese, truffle strips and tomato sauté surrounded with the same sauce	
Mireille	Mireille	With tomatoes concassées flavoured with garlic, cream sauce coloured with saffron poured around	
Mistral	Mistral	Fry diced aubergines in oil, pour egg mixture, mixed with diced sautéed tomatoes, a little crushed garlic and chopped parsley, over the aubergines, cook on both sides and served flat	
Molière	Molière	With Parmesan and Gruyère cheese and thick double cream	
Mona Lisa	Mona Lisa	With strips of fieldfare Surrounded with chasseur sauce	
Monaco	À la monégasque	Tomato purée and chopped tarragon In the egg mixture garnished with anchovy fillets and a trickle of anchovy sauce poured around	
Monkfish liver	Aux foies de lottes	With monkfish livers, surrounded with demi-glace	
Monselet	Monselet	Stuffed with truffles and mushrooms, asparagus heads, foie gras purée,	
Montbry	Montbry	Grated horseradish and chopped spring onion	
Morels	Aux morilles	With sliced fried morels; demi-glace poured round around the omelette	
Mushrooms	Aux champignons	Egg mixture, mixed with sliced sautéed mushrooms, thick gravy poured around	
Mussels	Aux moules	With mussels, white of leeks and chopped tomatoes	
Nana	Nana	Strips of mushrooms and shredded lettuce in the omelette mixture, stuffed with diced sweetbreads in cream sauce, cream sauce blended with essence of truffles poured around	
Nantes-style	À la nantaise	With sardine purée, surrounded with white wine sauce	
Nantua-style	Nantua	With salpicon of crayfish tails, garnished with crayfish tails, surrounded with Nantua sauce	
Newburg	Newburg	With diced lobster in cream and brandy sauce with cayenne pepper	
Nice-style	À la niçoise	With tomatoes concassées and diced green beans surrounded with demi-glace or thick veal gravy	
Nimes-style	À la nîmoise	Cooked in oil stuffed with purée of salted codfish, garnished with truffle slices	
Ninon	Ninon	With asparagus purée Garnished with sliced truffles, coated with light cream sauce	
Nivernese-style	À la nivernaise	With small glazed button onions, coated with demi-glace, garnished with glazed young carrots	
Noailles	Noailles	With fried chicken livers and kidneys, cream sauce poured around	
Normandy-style	À la normande	With ragoût of shrimps and mushrooms bound with Normandy sauce, garnished with sliced truffles and oysters, a border of Normandy sauce poured around the omelette	
Olympia	Olympia	With diced crabmeat and sweet peppers in cream sauce	
Omelette, plain	Omelette nature	Served without garnish of any kind	
Opera	Opéra	With chicken livers and asparagus tips, surrounded with Madeira sauce	
Ostend-style	À l'ostendaise	With poached oysters in white wine sauce garnished with sliced truffles, border of white wine sauce	
Ox marrow	À la moelle	With diced, blanched ox marrow in Madeira or Burgundy sauce, garnished with slices of blanched ox marrow, sprinkled with chopped parsley, surrounded with Madeira or Burgundy sauce	
Oysters	Aux huitres	With poached bearded oysters in cream sauce	
Pantagruel	Pantagruel	Diced truffles in the egg mixture stuffed with diced quail breasts in Madeira sauce, the same sauce poured round the omelette	
Parisian	À la parisienne	With strips of truffles, ox tongue and mushrooms, stuffed with chicken purée	
Parmentier	Parmentier	With fried diced potatoes and chopped parsley	
Perigord-style	À la périgourdine	With finely diced truffles, truffle sauce poured round	
Portuguese-style	À la portugaise	Stuffed with tomatoes concassées surrounded with tomato sauce	
Potatoes	Aux pommes de terre	Made with diced fried potatoes in the egg mixture	
Prelate	Du prélat	Mixed with shredded lettuce, stuffed with ragoût of lobster, crayfish tails and truffles in lobster sauce, border of Normande sauce	
Prince-style	À la princière	Guinea fowl eggs, mixed with strips of truffles and stuffed with asparagus tips	
Princess	À la princesse	Finely diced chicken and truffles in the egg mixture, stuffed with creamed asparagus tips garnished with asparagus tips	
Provençal-style	À la provençale	With large cubes of tomatoes simmered in oil, mixed with a little crushed garlic and chopped parsley	
Queen-style	À la reine	With creamed chicken purée, surrounded with suprême sauce	
Raspail	Raspail	With chopped boiled beef, ham and herbs in demi-glace; served surrounded with demi-glace	
Reform	À la réform	With strips of ox tongue, hard-boiled egg whites, pickled cucumbers and truffles	
Regency	À la régence	With ragoût of cockscombs and cocks' kidneys, mushrooms, truffles, ham and ox tongue in Regency sauce	
Rich man's omelette	Richemonde	With creamed sliced mushrooms and truffles and covered with hollandaise	
Rigoletto	Rigoletto	With diced truffles and ox marrow in meat glaze; served with a border of tomato sauce	
Robert	Robert	Diced fried bacon and fried onions are added to the egg mixture; served surrounded with sauce Robert	
Roman	À la romaine	With braised shredded spinach, mixed with chopped anchovies and a little garlic, sur-rounded with demi-glace tomato	
Rose Caron	Rose Caron	With diced fried bacon and aubergines	
Rossini	Rossini	Diced truffles and fried goose liver mixed with the beaten eggs, garnished with small slices of fried goose liver and truffles, covered with Madeira sauce	
Rouen-style	À la rouennaise	With duck liver purée; Rouenese sauce (made of red wine, duck liver, shallots and ducks' blood) poured around	
Royal	À la royale	With creamed chicken purée mixed with chopped truffles; garnished with sliced truffles; cream sauce poured around	
Russian	À la russe	Mixture seasoned with paprika stuffed with cold caviar, surrounded with shallot sauce	
Sagan	Sagan	With diced calf's brain surrounded with suprême sauce	
Saint-Flour	Saint-Flour	With onions, bacon and cabbage	
Saint-Hubert	Saint-Hubert	With game purée, garnished with mushroom caps, demi-glace or salmi sauce poured around	
Salvator or Salvatore	Salvator or Salvatore	With strips of ham and truffles in Madeira sauce	
Sarah Bernhardt	Sarah Bernhardt	With diced truffles, cockscombs and cocks' kidneys in cream sauce	
Saratoga	Saratoga	With diced crabmeat and green peppers in Creole sauce	
Savoy-style	À la savoyarde	With bacon or ham, raw leek, diced cooked potato and Gruyère cheese	
Schinkel	Schinkel	Eggs mixed with strips of artichoke bottom Mushrooms and ham with a little crayfish butter, border of buttered meat glaze, mixed with chopped tarragon	
Sea Food	Aux fruits de mer	Two omelettes with chervil and parsley in the egg mix, sandwiching a ragoût of mussels, shrimps, cockles and other shellfish, served with a cream sauce	
Seville-style	À la sévillane	With tomatoes concassées, mixed with diced green olives, flavoured with garlic surrounded with white velouté sauce mixed with a little tomato purée and blended with anchovy butter	
Shepherd-style	À la bergère	With hashed lamb mixed with diced mushrooms, surrounded with demi-glace	
Shrimps	Aux crevettes	With shrimps in shrimp sauce, surrounded with more shrimp sauce	
Sigurd	Sigurd	With sliced morels and truffles	
Sorrel	À l'oseille	Cooked with shredded sorrel in the egg mixture	
Soubise	Soubise	Filled with white onion purée, served surrounded with veal gravy	
Spanish (1)	À l'espagnole	With tomatoes concassées and garnished with deep-fried onion rings	
Spanish (2)	La Frita	Eggs mixed with chopped stewed onions and grated cheese, served flat and browned on both sides	
Spinach	Aux épinards	With creamed spinach purée, cream sauce poured around	
Spring onion	À la ciboulette	Plain omelette except for the addition of chopped spring onions to the egg mix	
Stuffed omelette	Omelette fourrée	A small omelette stuffed with any kind of purée and folded in a larger one of different taste; also term for any stuffed omelette	
Sweetcorn	Au maïs à la crème	Creamed sweetcorn is added to the egg mix; served with a cream sauce	
Swiss	À la suisse	Mixed with grated Swiss cheese, served flat on a round dish, sprinkled generously with grated Swiss cheese	
Talleyrand	Tallyrand	With onions, curry powder and sliced veal sweetbreads; served with cream sauce	
Tanitscheff	Tanitscheff	With ragoût of cockscombs and cocks' kidneys, mushrooms and truffles in Allemande sauce	
Tomatoes	Aux tomates	With tomatoes concassées, incision made on top of omelette, filled with tomatoes and sprinkled with chopped parsley	
Tortilla espanola	Tortilla espanola	Sliced onions and raw potatoes fried in oil, omelette mixture poured over, cooked on both sides and arranged flat on a round dish	
Trafalgar	Trafalgar	With deep fried whitebait	
Trouville	À la trouvillaise	With ragoût of mussels, mushrooms and shrimps in white wine sauce, surrounded with shrimp sauce	
Truffle	Aux truffles	Sliced truffles are added to the egg mix; a few large slices of truffle heated in lightly buttered meat glaze are placed on top of the omelette	
Tsarina	À la czarine	With diced cucumber and mushrooms with a border of cream sauce	
Tuna	Au thon	With marinated tuna, served with anchovy butter	
Turinese	À la turinoise	With thicken liver and mushrooms, border of Madeira sauce	
Turkish (17th c.)	À la turque	With chopped hare or other game, plus pine nuts or roast and peeled chestnuts, with fines herbs	
Turkish (20th c.)	À la turque	With poultry liver, surrounded with tomato demi-glace	
Valencia	Valencia	With risotto, coated with cream sauce mixed with chopped red peppers	
Vichy	Vichy	With Vichy carrots in cream sauce, stuffed with ragoût of lobster and truffles in lobster sauce	
Victoria	Victoria	Stuffed with diced lobster and truffles in lobster sauce	
Village-style	À la villageoise	With diced sautéed mushrooms mixed with chopped herbs	
Viveur	Viveur	With artichoke hearts, celeriac and diced fillet of beef	
Vosges-style	À la vosgienne	With smoked ham and Gruyère cheese	
Wedic	Wedic	With saffron rice mixed with diced mangoes and tomatoes, surrounded with suprême sauce blended with pistachio butter	
Yarmouth-style	Yarmouth	With flaked bloaters, surrounded with white wine sauce	

Sweet omelettes are less frequently seen than savoury ones, although in earlier centuries they were at least as numerous. In modern times they include Omelette à la Célestine (filled with apricot jam and sprinkled with caster sugar); à la dijonnaise (crushed macarons and cream added to the egg mix, stuffed with blackcurrant jam and crème pâtissière); à la Frangipane (filled with Frangipane); à la normande (filled with apple purée); à la norvégienne (similar to Baked Alaska); and Reine Pédauque (with apple purée, cream, kirsch and meringue).

== Sources ==
- Bickel, Walter (1989). Hering's Dictionary of Classical and Modern Cookery (eleventh ed.). London: Virtue. ISBN 978-3-8057-0307-9.
- Brazier, Eugénie; Moreau, Roger; Bocuse, Paul; Pacaud, Bernard (2015) [2004]. La Mère Brazier: The Mother of Modern French Cooking. London: Modern Books. ISBN 978-1-906761-84-4.
- David, Elizabeth (1986) [1984]. An Omelette and a Glass of Wine. London: Penguin. ISBN 978-0-14-046721-5.
- David, Elizabeth (1999) [1980]. Elizabeth David Classics. London: Grub Street. ISBN 978-1-902304-27-4.
- David, Elizabeth (2008) [1960]. French Provincial Cooking. London: Folio Society. OCLC 809349711.
- Davidson, Alan (1999). The Oxford Companion to Food. Oxford: Oxford University Press. ISBN 978-0-19-211579-9.
- Escoffier, Auguste (1934). Ma Cuisine (in French). Paris: Flamarion. OCLC 981486233.
- La Varenne, François Pierre (1663). Le Pastissier françois (in French). Paris: Jean Gaillard. OCLC 924246085.
- Montagné, Prosper (1976). Larousse gastronomique. London: Hamlyn. OCLC 1285641881.
- Saulnier, Louis (1978) [1923]. Le Répertoire de la cuisine. London: Jaeggi. OCLC 1086737491.
