= Albufera sauce =

Classic French sauce

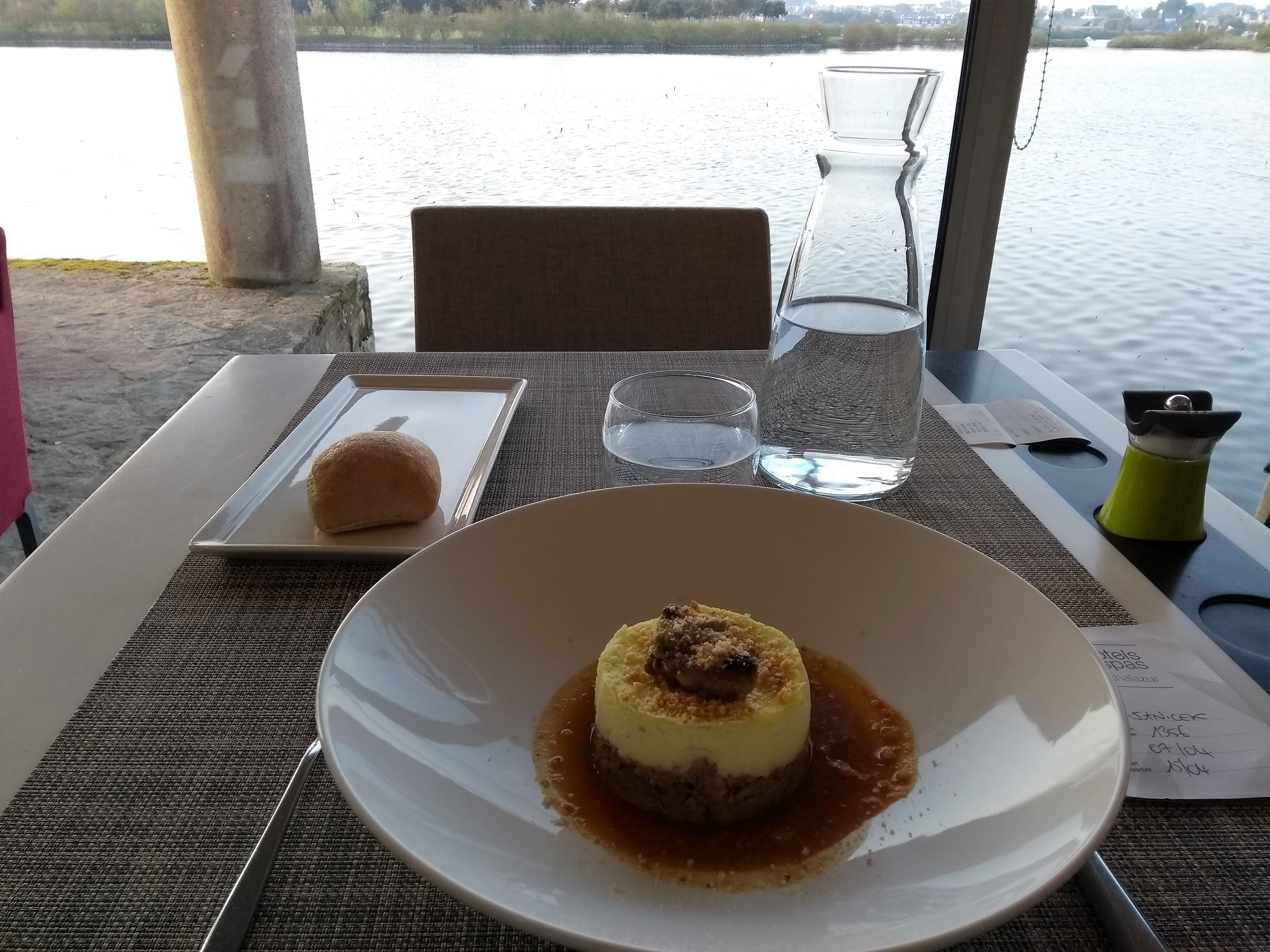
Parmentier of duck confit with pan-fried foie gras and Albufera sauce

Albufera sauce (French: sauce Albuféra) is a daughter sauce of French cuisine. It is based on a suprême sauce, which itself derives from the mother sauce velouté.

Escoffier shares a recipe in Le Guide culinaire which consists of a base of suprême sauce to which is added meat glaze in order to lend the latter an ivory-white tint which characterizes it. It is served chiefly with poultry and sweetbreads. Louis Gabriel Suchet (1770–1826), one of Napoleon's generals and Marshal of France for a time, was named duc d'Albufera after a lake near Valencia, Spain, to mark his victory there during the Peninsular War. Marie-Antoine Carême created several dishes in the duke's honor, including duck, beef, and the sauce that accompanies this chicken.
