= Sauce Robert =

French brown mustard sauce

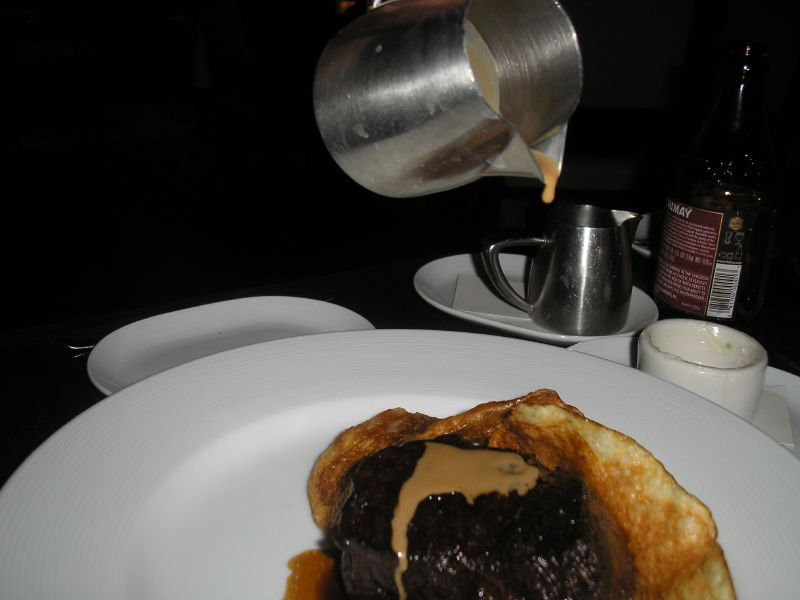
Steak with sauce Robert

Sauce Robert (French pronunciation: [sos ʁɔbɛʁ]) is a brown mustard sauce and one of the small sauces, or compound sauces, derived from the classic French demi-glace, which in turn is derived from espagnole sauce, one of the five mother sauces in French cuisine (béchamel, velouté, espagnole, sauce tomate, and hollandaise).

Sauce Robert is made from chopped onions cooked in butter without color, a reduction of white wine, pepper, an addition of demi-glace and is finished with mustard.

It is suited to red meat, specifically pork, typically grilled pork.

== History ==
Sauce Robert is one of the earliest compound sauces on record. Of the 78 compound sauces systematized by Marie-Antoine Carême in the early 19th century, only two—sauce Robert and remoulade—were present in much older cookbooks, such as François Massialot's Le Cuisinier Roial et Bourgeois, from 1691. In Charles Perrault's canonical telling of Sleeping Beauty (1696), the ogress Queen Mother insists that Sleeping Beauty and her children be served to her à la sauce Robert.

A version of sauce Robert also appears in Francois-Pierre de la Varenne's Le Cuisinier François (1651), the founding text of modern French cuisine.
