= Bercy (disambiguation) =

Bercy is an area of southeast Paris.

Bercy may also refer to:

- Bercy station (Paris Metro), a station at the intersection of the Boulevard de Bercy and the Rue de Bercy
- Gare de Paris Bercy, a station specialising in auto-trains
- Ministry of the Economy and Finance building, headquarters of the Ministry of the Economy and Finance, both often informally referred to as Bercy
- Accor Arena, the branding of the Palais Omnisports de Paris-Bercy, a sports stadium
- Paris Masters, a tennis tournament held annually in the stadium, sometimes called Bercy
- Pont de Bercy, a bridge over the Seine
- Sauce Bercy, in cooking
