= Wine sauce =

Culinary sauce

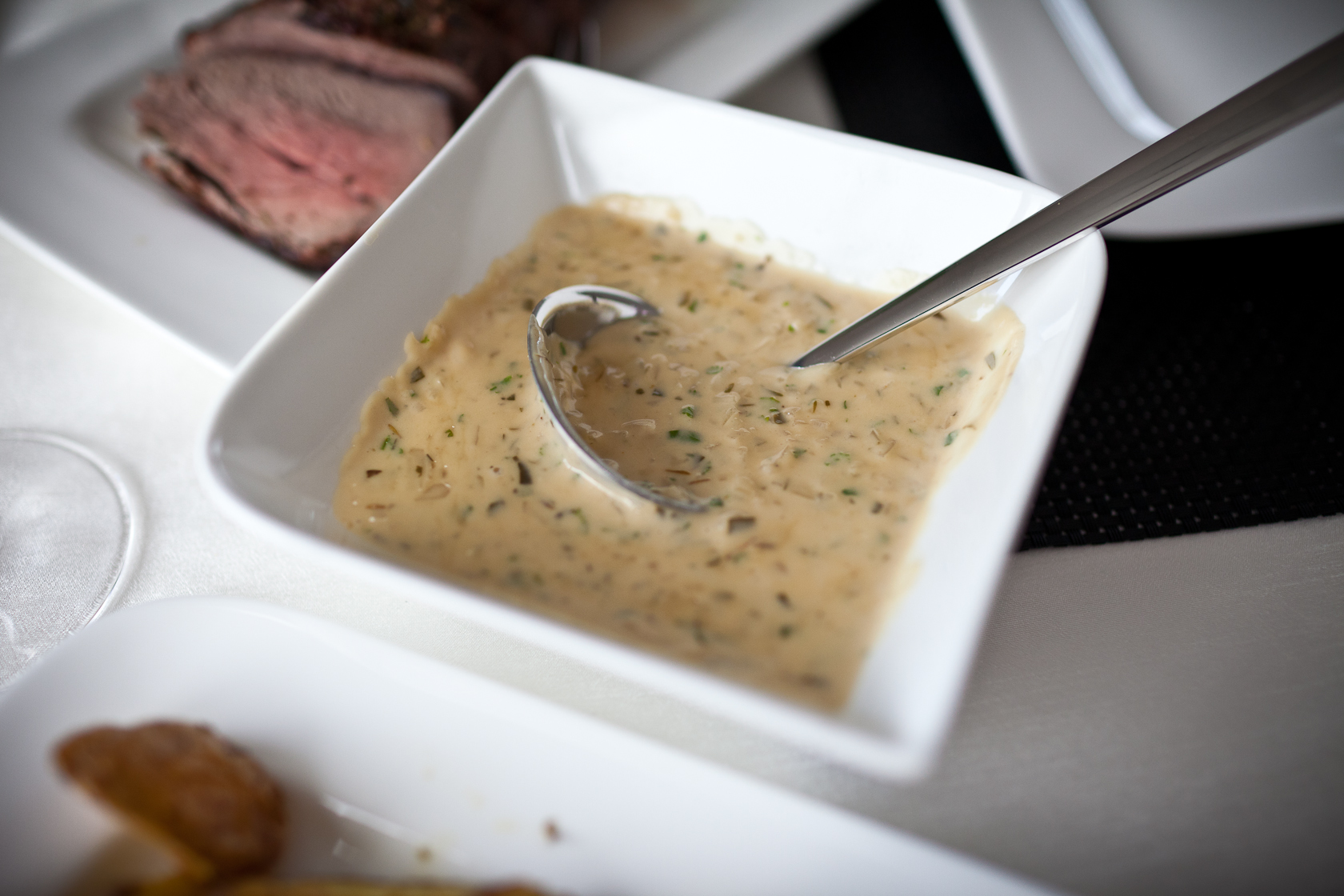
White wine sauce with beef

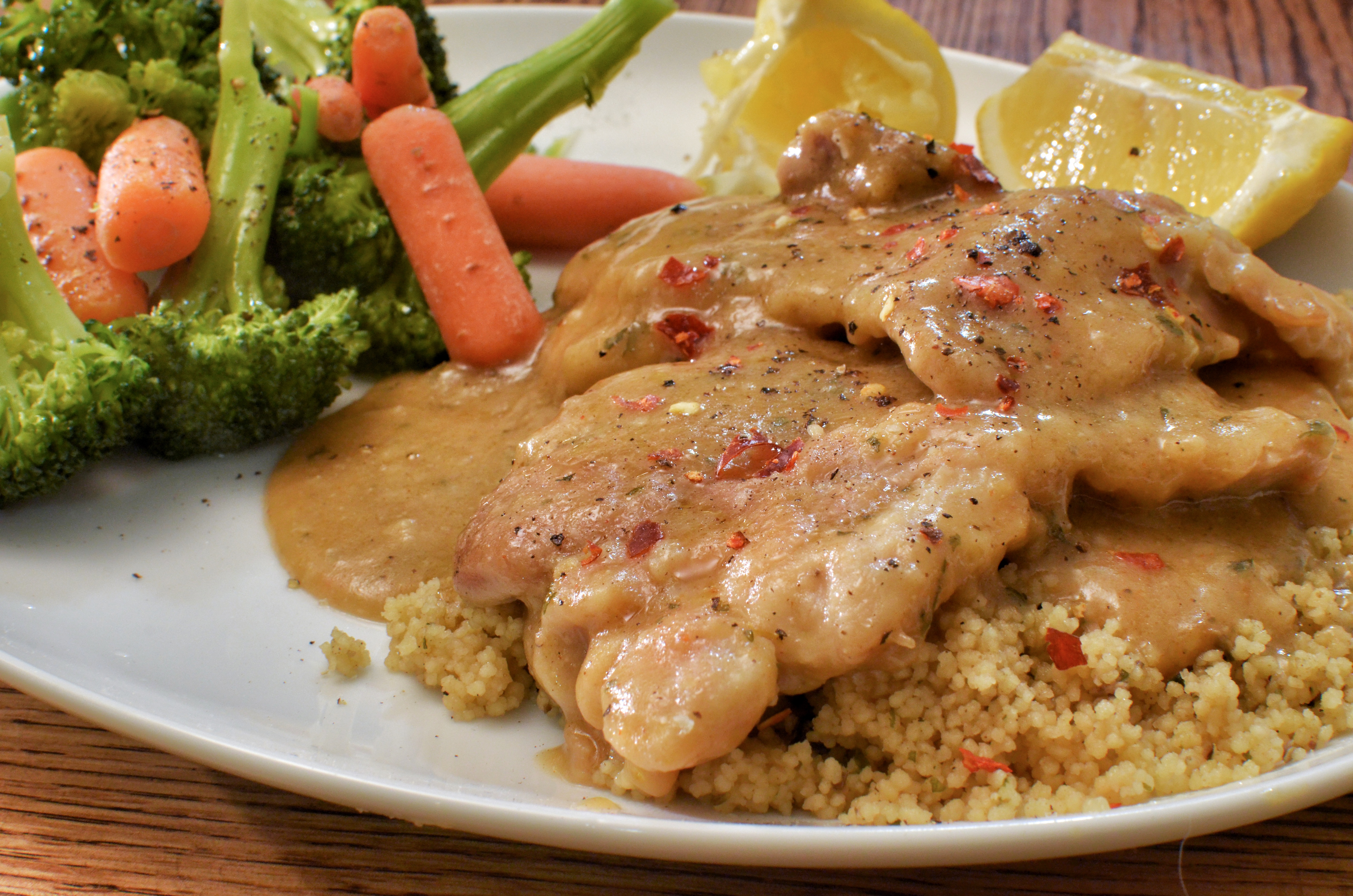
Chicken in wine sauce over couscous

Wine sauce is a culinary sauce prepared with wine as a primary ingredient, heated and mixed with stock, butter, herbs, spices, onions, garlic and other ingredients. Several types of wines may be used, including red wine, white wine and port wine. Some versions are prepared using a reduction. Several types of wine sauces exist, and it is used in many dishes, including those prepared with seafood, poultry and beef. Wine sauces are associated with French cuisine.

== Ingredients and preparation ==
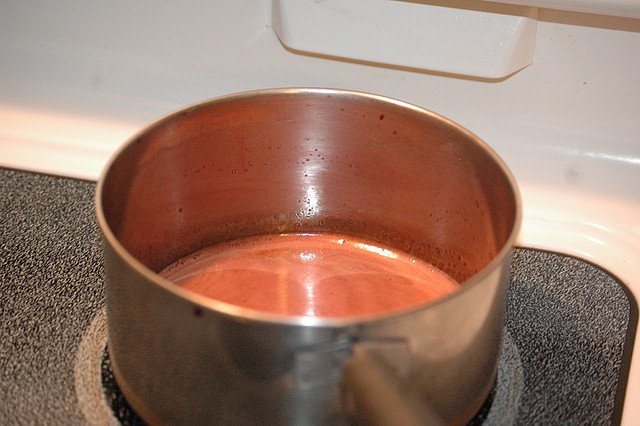
Reduction of red wine

Wine is a primary ingredient in wine sauce. Wine sauce may be prepared using various wines, such as red wines, white wines, Burgundy wines, and port wines, among others. Ingredients in addition to wine may include stock, mushrooms, butter or shrimp butter, tarragon vinegar, shallot, chervil, tarragon, spices, onion, garlic and others. Some wine sauces are prepared using a reduction, which may intensify their flavor or make the flavor sharper. Reduced wine may be used to prepare thicker wine sauces, while those lacking a reduction are generally thin. Some wine sauces are creamy, prepared with the addition of cream or milk.

Fish velouté is a French velouté sauce base from which several types of sauces can be prepared, including wine sauce. White wine sauce and champagne sauce are the most common sauces prepared from a fish velouté base.

== Varieties ==
Several types of wine sauces exist using wine as a primary ingredient. Sauce poivrade is a wine sauce in French cuisine that is prepared with mirepoix thickened with flour and moistened with wine and a little vinegar, then heavily seasoned with pepper. Sauce bourguignonne is a French sauce with a base of red wine with onions or shallots. Bordelaise sauce is a classic French sauce prepared with red wine, meat glaze or demi-glace, butter, shallots and bone marrow. Sauce lyonnaise is a French sauce prepared with white wine, vinegar and onions, which may be served with meat.

Some sauces, such as Normande sauce, use wine as a flavorant rather than as a main ingredient.

Wine sauces

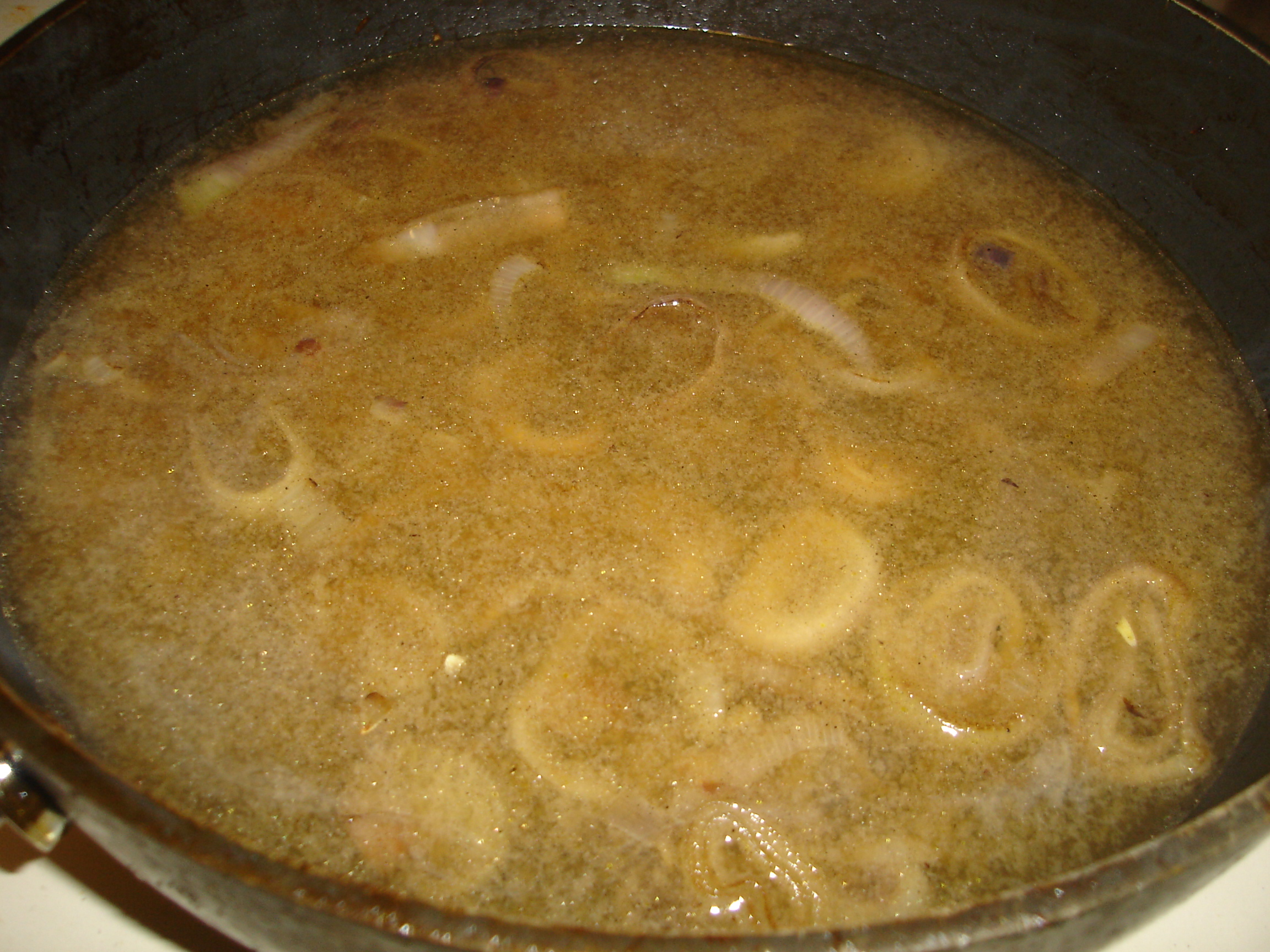
White wine sauce with shallot being cooked

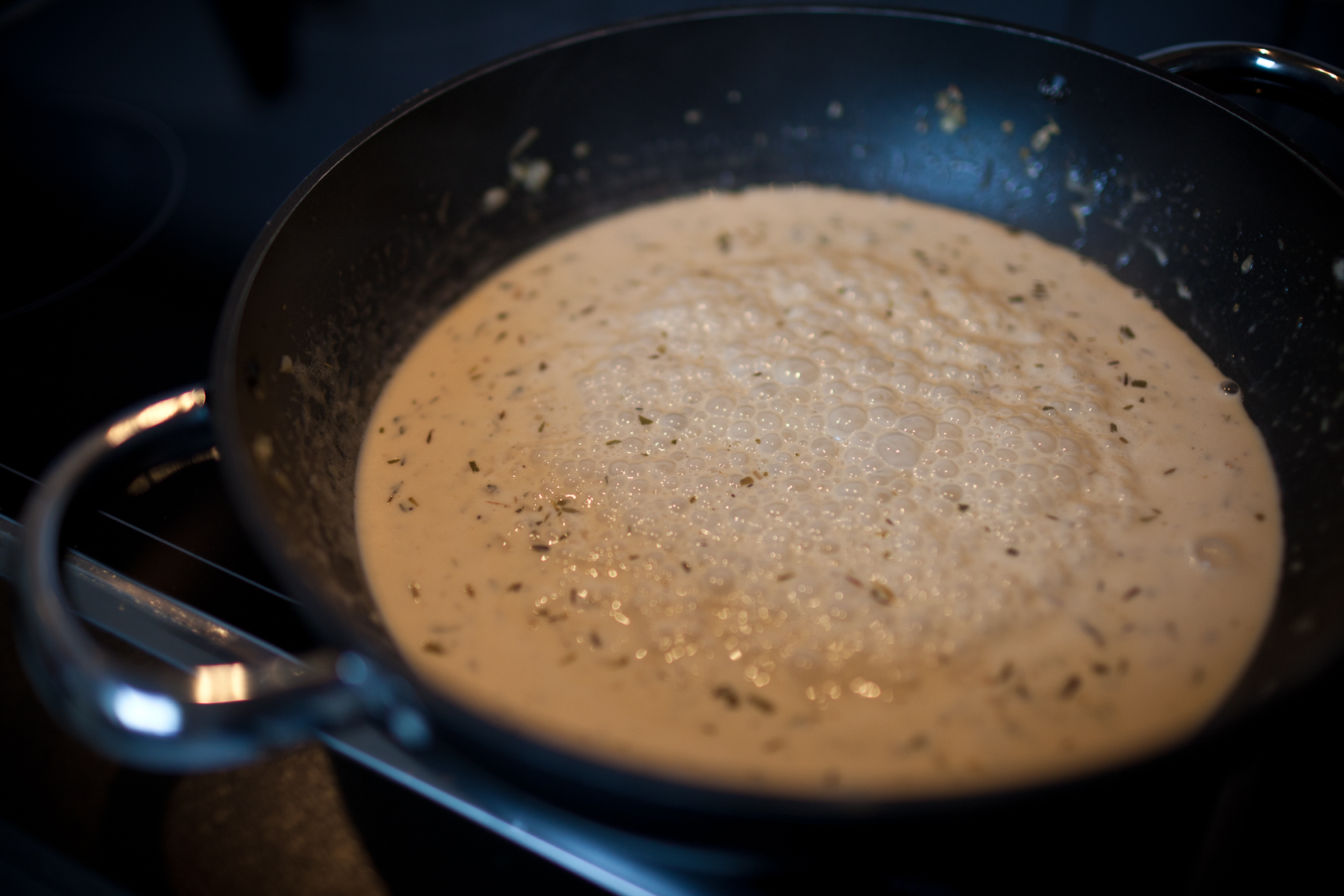
Sauce poivrade being cooked

== Use in dishes ==
"I cook with wine – sometimes I even add it to the food".

— Comedian W. C. Fields

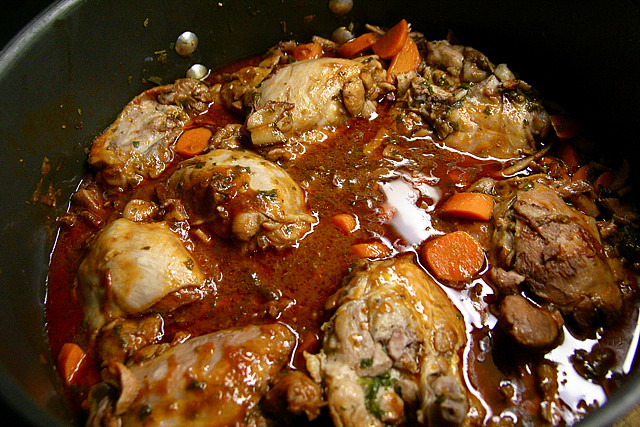
Close-up of coq au vin rouge

Wine sauce may be used in seafood dishes, such as those prepared using tuna and salmon. White wine sauce has been described as "a classic sauce for fish". It is used for poultry dishes, such as chicken, quail and others. Coq au vin is a French chicken dish that may be prepared using wine sauce prepared from red or white wine. Wine sauce is used in various beef dishes. Swiss steak is sometimes prepared with wine sauce. Pork dishes may also be prepared with it, such as those prepared from boneless pork loin or pork tenderloin. It may be used with rabbit dishes, and with some wild game dishes. Vegetarian dishes may also be prepared using wine sauce.

Wine sauce is sometimes used as a marinade for seafood preparations, such as herring in wine sauce, which is prepared by allowing cured herring to soak in a vinegar and wine sauce. This may be performed with the fish and sauce in jars. The wine sauce for this preparation is made by boiling vinegar, wine, onion, sugar and spices, such as bay leaf, cinnamon, clove, allspice, ginger, nutmeg and pepper, after which is rests to allow time for the ingredients to incorporate their flavors. Afterward, the sauce is strained and used to marinate the herring.

Additionally, plain wine itself without any further preparation may be used as a sauce on foods, such as on pears or on desserts such as ice cream.

Wine sauce in dishes

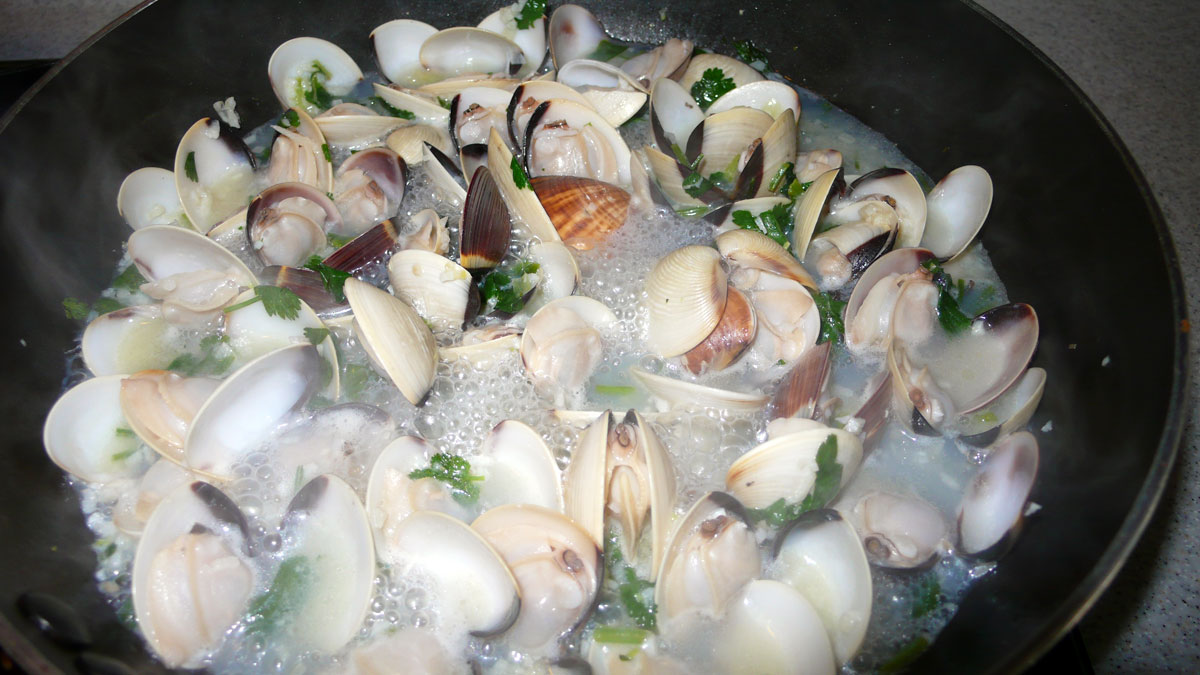
Clams simmering in a white wine sauce

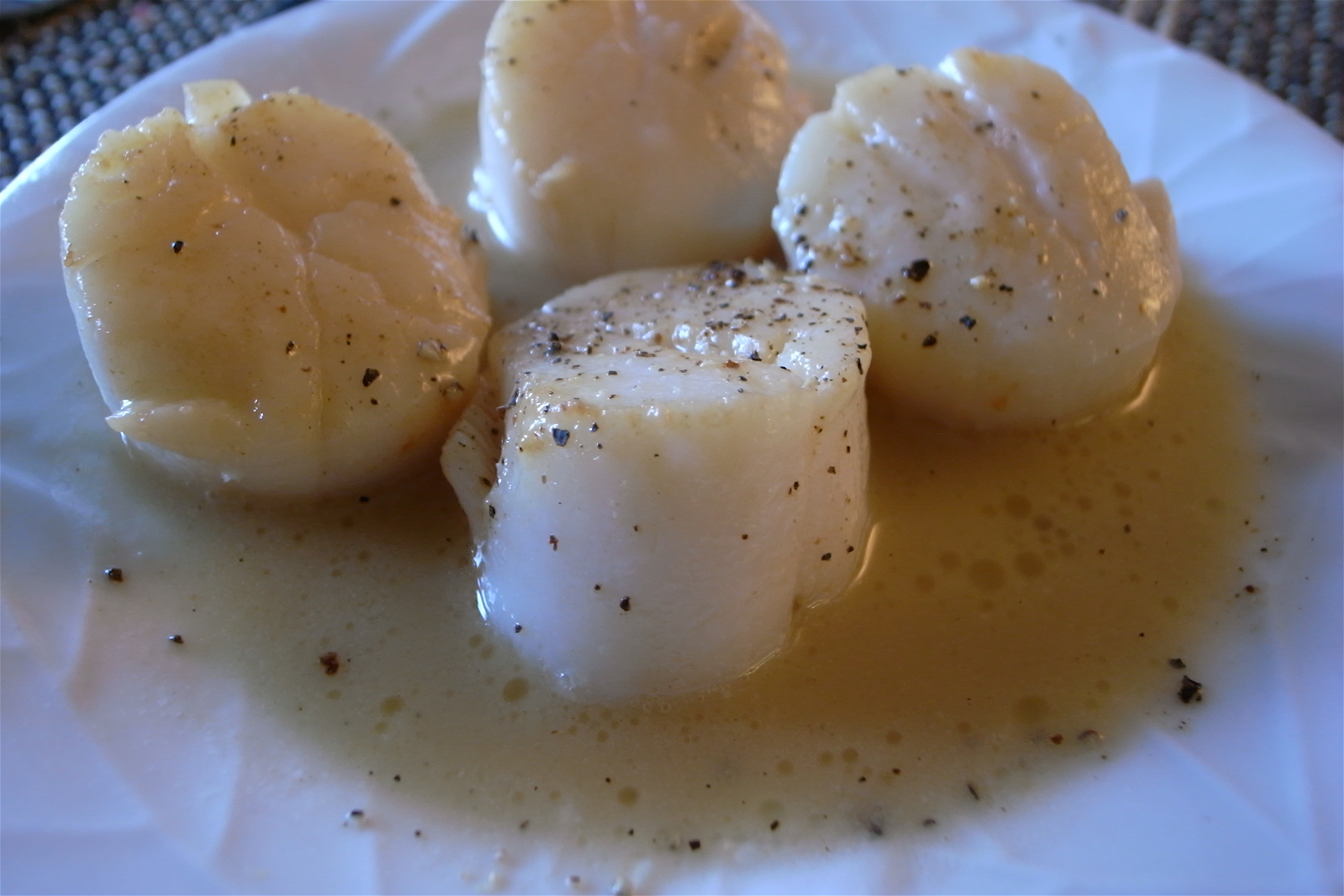
Scallops with wine sauce

== See also ==
- Cooking with wine
- List of sauces
- Wine and food matching
