= Venetian sauce =

French herb sauce

Venetian sauce (French: Sauce vénitienne) is a classical French herb sauce used to accompany fish. It consists of:

- a velouté and fish fumet base
- equal quantities of tarragon vinegar and white wine reduced with:
- chopped shallots and chervil
- White wine sauce
- Herb juice

After cooking, it is strained and finished with chopped chervil and tarragon.

== See also ==
- List of sauces
