= Brown sauce (meat stock based) =

Sauce made with brown meat stock

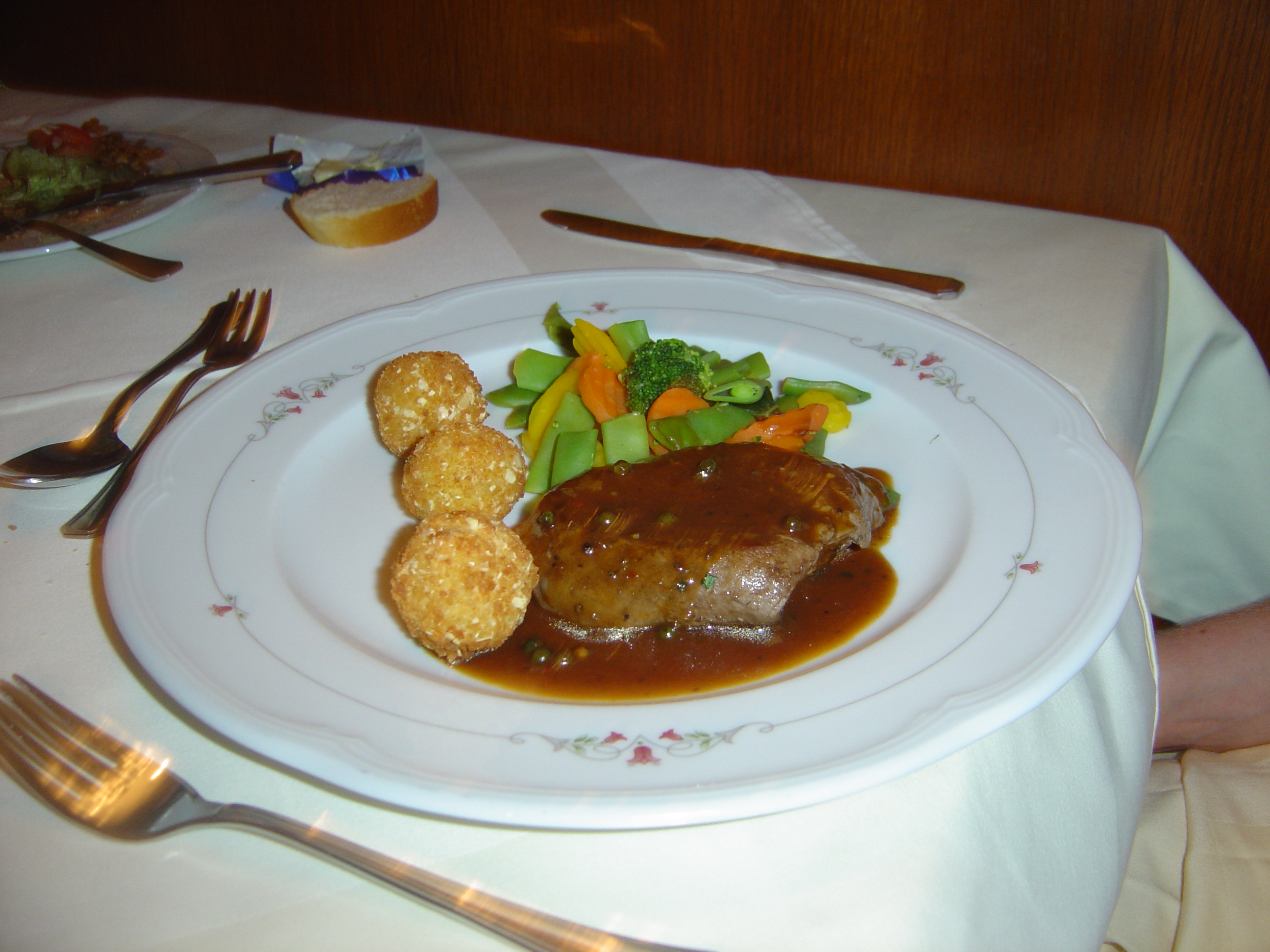
Brown sauce in Austrian dish

In classic French cuisine, a brown sauce is generally a sauce with a meat stock base, thickened by reduction and sometimes the addition of a browned roux, similar in some ways to, but more involved than, a gravy. The classic mother sauce example is espagnole sauce, as well as its derivative demi-glace, though other varieties exist.

== Nordic countries ==
In Danish cuisine, brown sauce (brun sovs) is a very common sauce, and refers to a sauce with a meat stock base (in modern times, often replaced by broth made from bouillon cubes), thickened by a roux, and sometimes colored a rich, deep brown with a product consisting of dark caramelized sugar, known as brun kulør (literally, "brown colouring") or madkulør (literally, "food colouring") or collorit soya (in Sweden). It is similar to what is known in the UK as gravy browning and in the U.S. as a brown gravy. Variations include mushroom sauce, onion sauce, and herbed brown sauce.

The Norwegian variety (brun saus) is made in the same way as the Danish brown sauce, usually from wheat flour. The sauce is colored by first browning the butter in the pan, before adding the wheat flour and letting it brown further. Food coloring (sukkerkulør, literally "sugar coloring"), soy sauce, and brown cheese (both for colour and taste) are sometimes added. The sauce may acquire different tastes depending on the meat served, as it is common to cook the meat for a while in the sauce before serving.

In Sweden (brunsås) and Finland (ruskeakastike), meatballs are usually served with a light brown, thick sauce, prepared in the same manner as sauce espagnole (combining dark brown roux with stock), but attains a lighter colour and smoother consistency due to the addition of cream. It is spiced with black pepper, and it is common to add soy sauce, blackcurrant jelly, apple sauce, onions, mustard, allspice, tomato puree or other ingredients to add flavor. It is available in ready-to-use or dehydrated form in stores.
