= Sauce bercy =

French sauce

Sauce Bercy is a classic sauce of French cuisine. The main ingredients are fish stock, velouté sauce, white wine, shallots and butter.

Auguste Escoffier wrote in Le guide culinaire that sauce Bercy is made to be served alongside fish.

== See also ==
- List of sauces
