= Hollandaise sauce =

Sauce made of egg, butter, and lemon

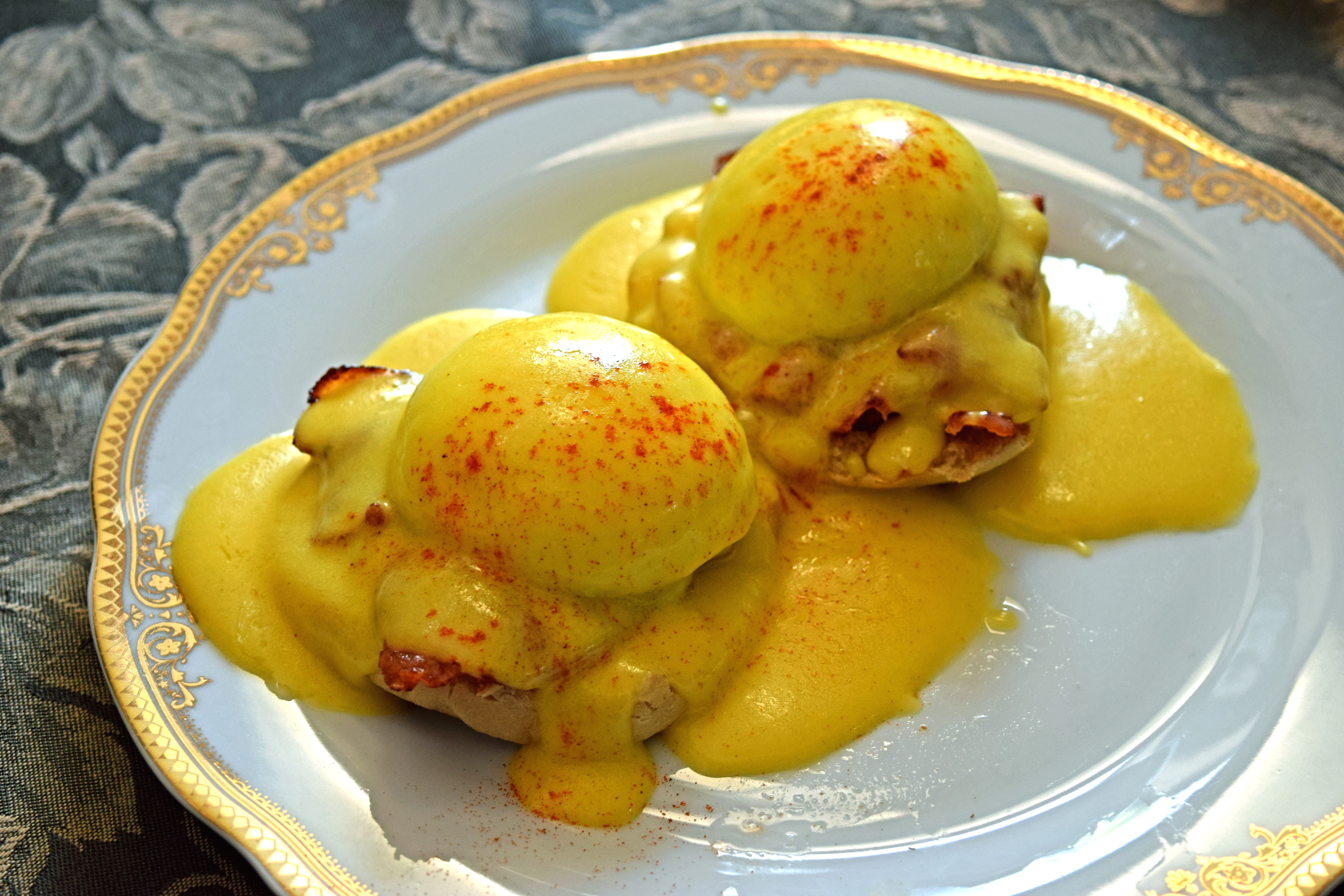
- Hollandaise sauce served as part of eggs Benedict, with a dash of paprika
- Type: Sauce
- Place of origin: France
- Main ingredients: Egg yolk, liquid butter, lemon juice

Hollandaise sauce (/hɒlənˈdeɪz/ or /ˈhɒləndeɪz/; from French sauce hollandaise [sos ɔlɑ̃dɛz] meaning "Dutch sauce") is a French recipe, a mixture of egg yolk, melted butter, and lemon juice (or a white wine or vinegar reduction). It is usually seasoned with salt, and either white pepper or cayenne pepper.

It is a key ingredient of eggs Benedict, and is often served on vegetables such as steamed asparagus.

== Origins ==
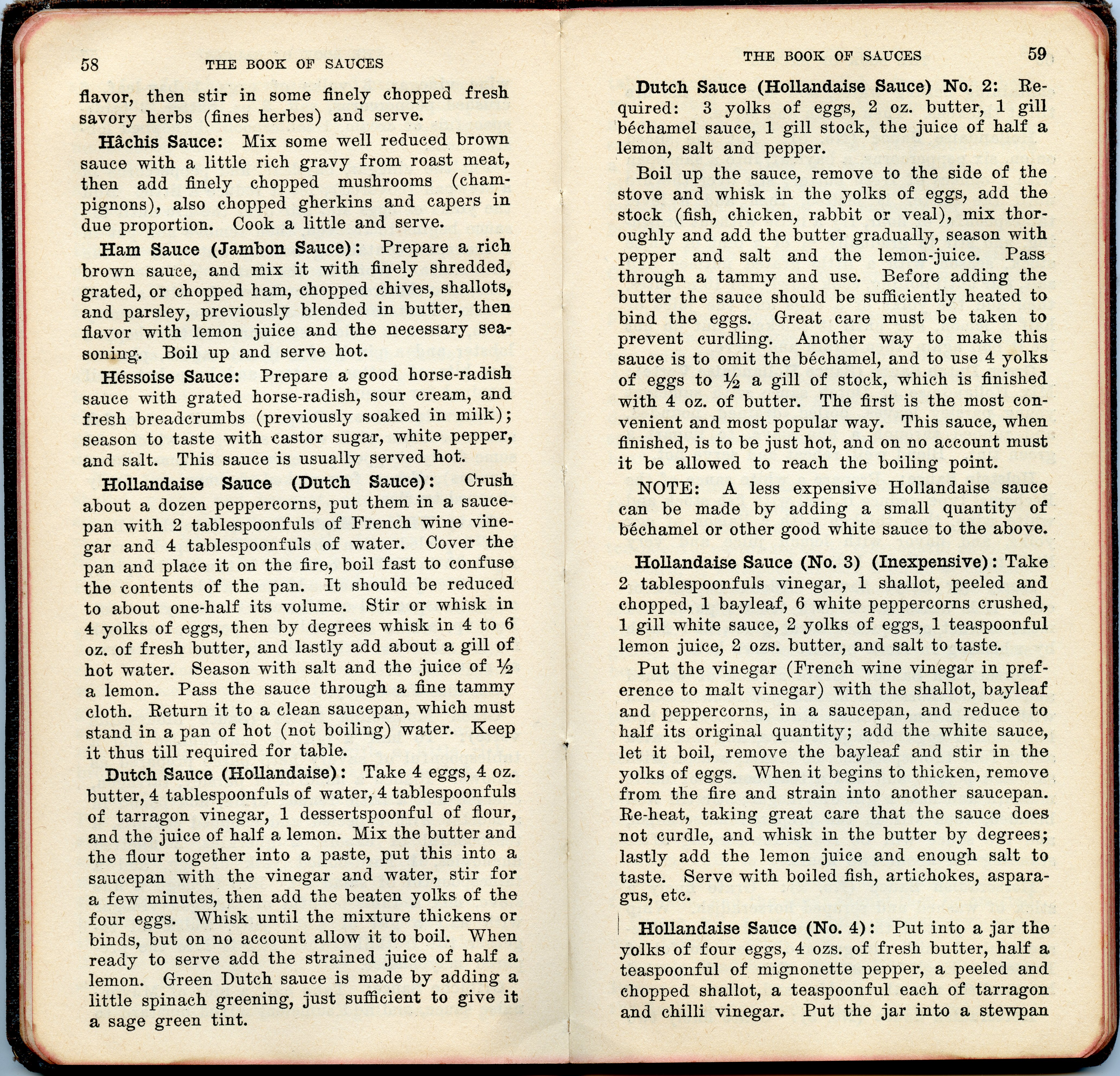
Some variations on hollandaise sauce

Sauce hollandaise is French for 'Hollandic sauce'. (Note: The French tended to give foreign names to their creations, hollandaise being one of them.) The first documented recipe is from 1651 in La Varenne's Le Cuisinier François for "asparagus with fragrant sauce":

make a sauce with some good fresh butter, a little vinegar, salt, and nutmeg, and an egg yolk to bind the sauce; take care that it doesn't curdle

The name was given during the Franco-Dutch war.

La Varenne is credited with bringing sauces out of the Middle Ages with his publication and may well have invented hollandaise sauce. A more recent name for it is sauce Isigny, named after Isigny-sur-Mer, which is famous for its butter. Isigny sauce is found in recipe books starting in the 19th century.

By the 19th century, sauces had been classified into four categories by Carême. One of his categories was allemande, which was a stock-based sauce using egg and lemon juice. Escoffier replaced allemande with egg-based emulsions, specifically mayonnaise, in his list of the mother sauces of haute cuisine. Hollandaise was included in the section on derivatives but in the English translation, the mention of mayonnaise as a mother sauce was removed and hollandaise was moved to the section on mother sauces.

While many assume that a true hollandaise sauce should only contain the basic ingredients of eggs, butter, and lemon, Prosper Montagne suggested using either a white wine or vinegar reduction, similar to a Béarnaise sauce, to help improve the taste.

In English, the name "Dutch sauce" was common through the 19th century, but was largely displaced by hollandaise in the 20th.

== Preparation and handling ==
As in other egg emulsion sauces, like mayonnaise and Béarnaise, the egg does not coagulate as in a custard; rather, the lecithin in the eggs serves as an emulsifier, allowing the mixture of the normally immiscible butter and lemon juice to form a stable emulsion.

To make hollandaise sauce, beaten egg yolks are combined with butter, lemon juice, salt, and water, and heated gently while being mixed. Some cooks use a double boiler to control the temperature. Some recipes add melted butter to warmed yolks; others call for unmelted butter and the yolks to be heated together; still others combine warm butter and eggs in a blender or food processor. Temperature control is critical, as excessive temperature can curdle the sauce. Some chefs start with a reduction. The reduction consists of vinegar, water and cracked peppercorns. These ingredients are reduced to "au sec" or almost dry, strained, and added to the egg yolk mixture.

Hollandaise can be frozen.

== Derivatives ==
Hollandaise and its derivative mayonnaise (hollandaise appearing in the 17th century and mayonnaise in the 18th century) are among the French mother sauces, and the foundation for many derivatives created by adding or changing ingredients, including:

- The most common derivative is egg yolk with reduction sauce Béarnaise. It can be produced by replacing the acidifying agent (vinegar reduction or lemon juice) in a preparation with a strained reduction of vinegar, shallots, fresh chervil, fresh tarragon, and (if to taste) crushed peppercorns. Alternatively, the flavorings may be added to a standard hollandaise. Béarnaise and its children are often used on steak or other "assertive" grilled meats and fish.
  - Sauce Choron is a variation of Béarnaise without tarragon or chervil, plus tomato purée.
  - Sauce Foyot (or Valois) is Béarnaise with meat glaze.
  - Sauce Colbert is sauce Foyot with reduced white wine.
  - Sauce Paloise is Béarnaise with mint substituted for tarragon.
- Sauce au vin blanc (for fish) is hollandaise with a reduction of white wine and fish stock.
- Sauce Bavaroise is hollandaise with cream, horseradish, and thyme.
- Sauce crème fleurette is hollandaise with crème fraîche.
- Sauce Dijon, also known as sauce moutarde or sauce Girondine, is hollandaise with Dijon mustard.
- Sauce Maltaise is hollandaise with blanched orange zest and the juice of blood orange.
- Sauce Mousseline, also known as sauce Chantilly, is hollandaise with whipped cream folded in.
  - Sauce divine is sauce Mousseline with reduced sherry in the whipped cream.
  - Madame Benoît's recipe for Mousseline uses whipped egg whites instead of whipped cream.
- Sauce noisette is hollandaise made with browned butter.
