= Normande sauce =

Culinary sauce

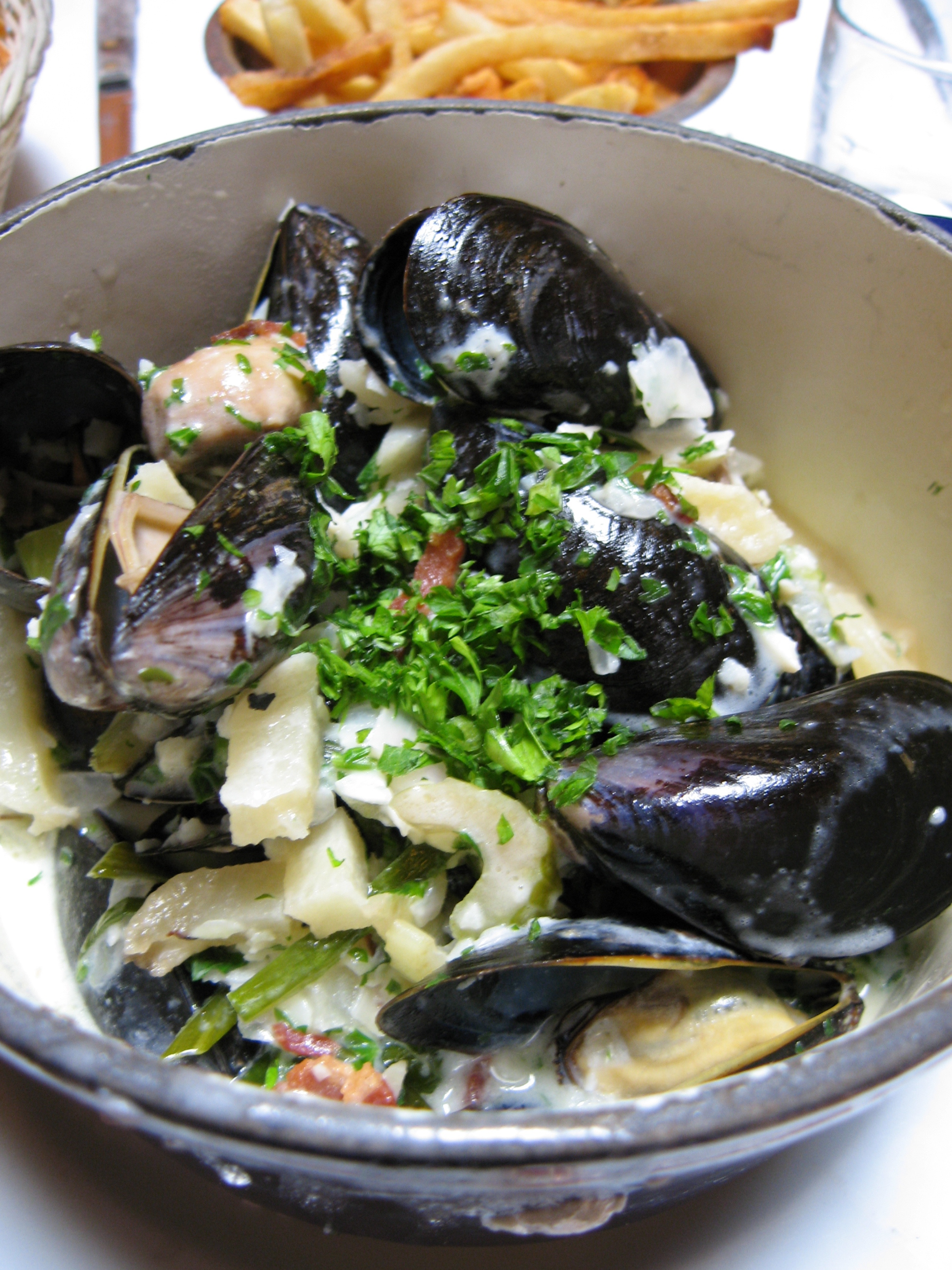
Moules Normandes: steamed mussels in Normande sauce with celery, leeks, mushrooms, potatoes and bacon

Normande sauce, also referred to as Normandy sauce and sauce Normande, is a culinary sauce prepared with velouté, fish velouté or fish stock, cream, butter and egg yolk as primary ingredients. Some versions may be prepared using both fish velouté and fish stock. Some may be prepared simply using a velouté base and the addition of cream, which are cooked together. Cider or dry white wine may also be used as primary ingredients.

Some versions may use mushrooms or mushroom ketchup in its preparation. Additional ingredients may include fish liquor (fish sauce), oyster liquor, mushroom liquor and lemon juice. Seasonings may include cayenne pepper, black pepper and salt. Some versions may be strained prior to use. The sauce may be used with seafood dishes, fettuccine dishes and on vegetables.

== Dishes with Normande sauce ==
Normande sauce may be served with seafood dishes such as those prepared with shellfish and fish. A 1911 recipe from Minneapolis, Minnesota uses the sauce as a garnish upon a molded fish dish. Sole Normande is a dish prepared using sole that is topped with Normande sauce.

It is sometimes used with fettuccine dishes, such as chicken fettuccine. It may also be served on vegetables to add flavor, such as asparagus, cauliflower, green peas, carrots and celery.

== See also ==
- List of sauces
- Normandy
