= Polonaise sauce =

Sauce in Polish cuisine

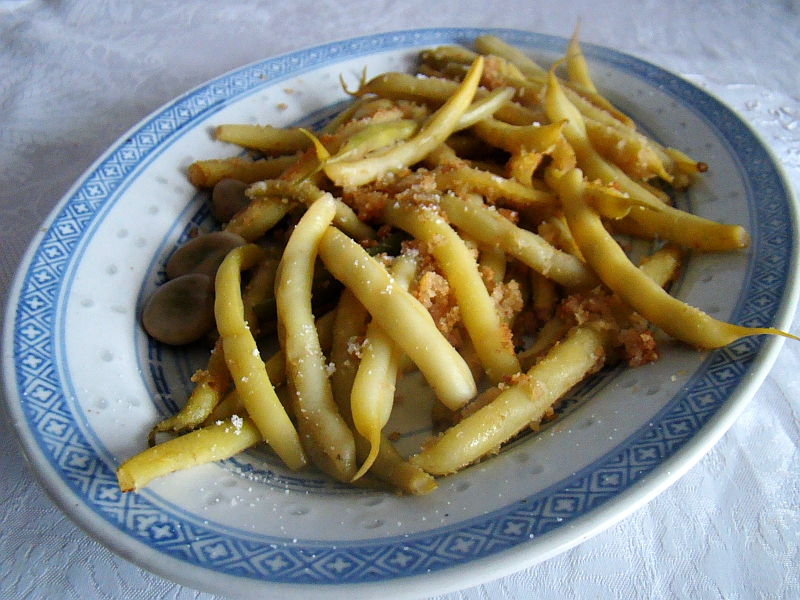
- Alternative names: Sauce à la polonaise (in French)
- Type: Sauce or garnish
- Place of origin: Poland
- Associated cuisine: Polish; French
- Main ingredients: Butter, breadcrumbs, herbs

Polonaise sauce (French: sauce à la polonaise, pronounced [sos a la pɔlɔnɛz]) is a sauce that originated in Poland and became popular in France in the 18th century. The sauce consists of melted butter, chopped boiled eggs, breadcrumbs, salt, lemon juice and herbs such as thyme, basil and parsley. It is poured over cooked or steamed vegetables, typically cauliflower, asparagus, wax beans or broccoli. Velouté à la polonaise is a wholly different sauce.

Preparation methods and ingredients differ among cooks. Variations include adding horseradish, sour cream, yogurt or kefir.
