= Suprême sauce =

Classic French sauce

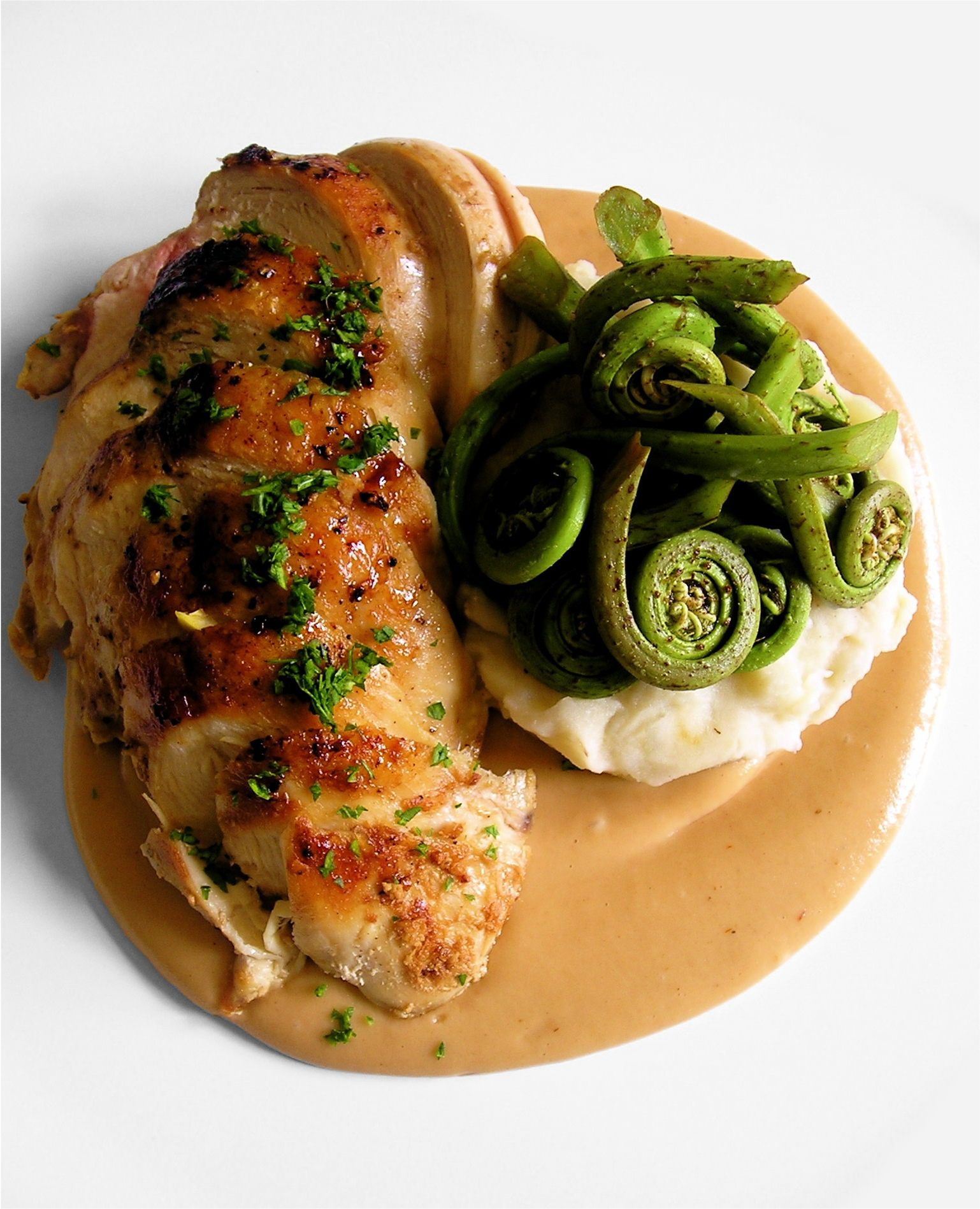
- Pan-roasted chicken breasts, garlic mashed potatoes, fiddlehead ferns and suprême sauce
- Type: Sauce
- Place of origin: France
- Main ingredients: Velouté sauce, cream or crème fraîche

Suprême sauce (French pronunciation: [sypʁɛm]) is a classic and popular "daughter sauce" of French cuisine. It consists of velouté, a "mother sauce", thickened with cream and strained.

== Recipes ==
According the Larousse Gastronomique, a seminal work of French haute cuisine, first published in 1938, suprême sauce is made from the mother sauce velouté (white stock thickened with a white roux—in the case of suprême sauce, chicken stock is usually preferred), reduced with heavy cream or crème fraîche, and then strained through a fine sieve.

A light squeeze of lemon juice is commonly added. In many cases, chefs also choose to add finely chopped and lightly sautéed mushrooms to the dish, although this was not specifically mentioned in Larousse Gastronomique or by Auguste Escoffier, the "Emperor of the World's Kitchens", who was an arbiter of classic French cuisine.

The Cook's Decameron suggests the following recipe: the sauce is made by placing three-quarters of a pint (350ml) of white sauce into a saucepan, and when it is nearly boiling, adding half a cup (120 ml) of concentrated fowl stock. It should then be reduced until the sauce is quite thick, passed through a chinois strainer into a bain-marie and have added two tablespoons (30 ml) of cream.

== See also ==
- List of sauces
- Supreme (cookery)
