= Velouté sauce =

French sauce made from roux and light stock

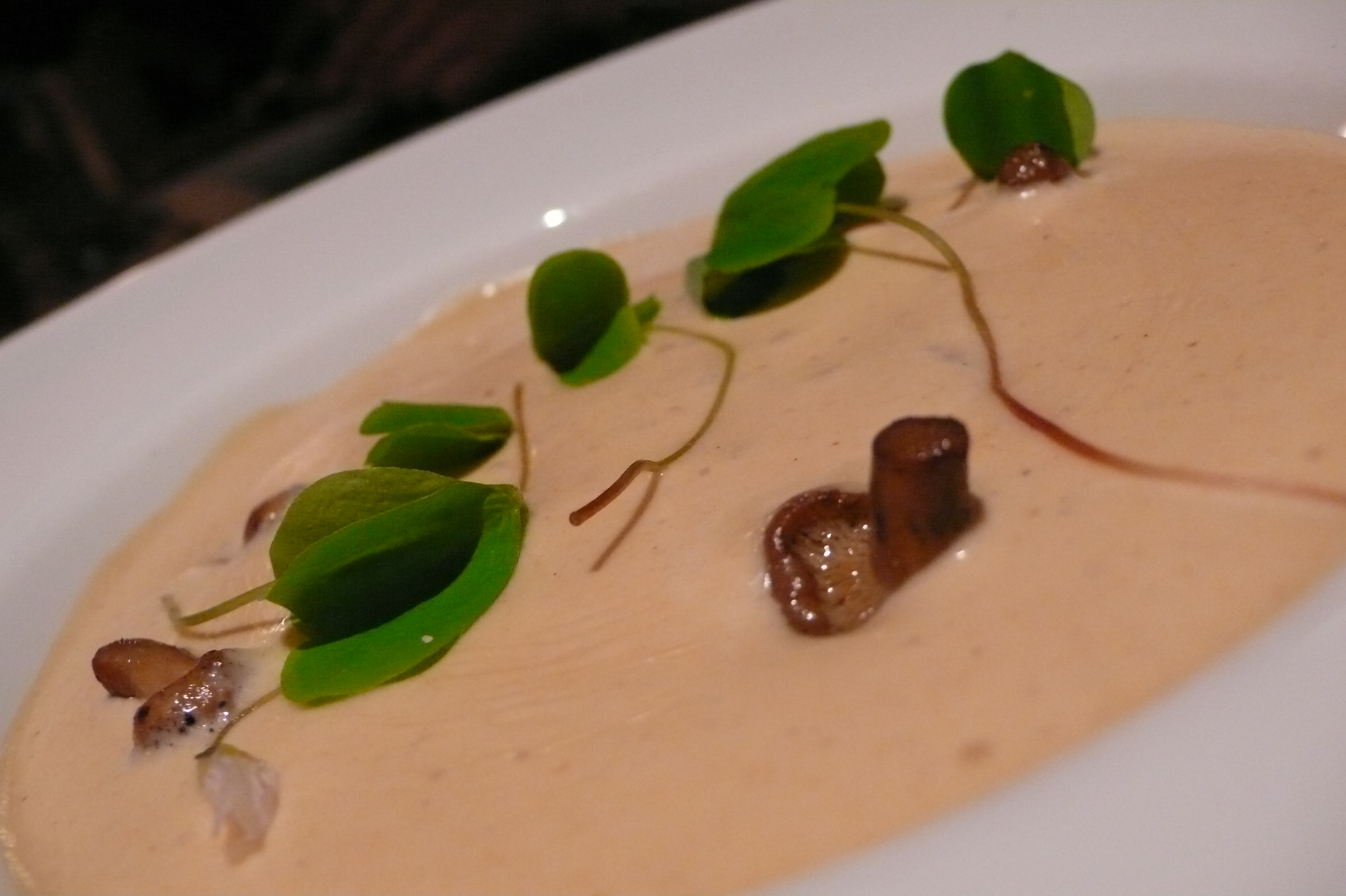
- Type: Sauce
- Place of origin: France
- Main ingredients: Stock, roux

A velouté sauce (French pronunciation: [vəlute]) is a savory sauce that is made from a roux and a light stock. It is one of the "mother sauces" of French cuisine listed by chef Auguste Escoffier in the early twentieth century. Velouté is French for 'velvety'.

In preparing a velouté sauce, a light stock (one in which the bones of the base used have not been roasted previously), such as veal, chicken, or fish stock, is thickened with a blond roux. The sauce produced is commonly referred to by the type of stock used (e.g. chicken velouté, fish velouté, seafood velouté).

== Derived sauces ==
Sauce velouté often is served on poultry or seafood dishes and is also used as the base for other sauces.

Sauces derived from a velouté sauce include:

- Albufera sauce: with addition of meat glaze, or glace de viande
- Allemande sauce: by adding a few drops of lemon juice, egg yolks, and cream
- Aurore: tomato purée
- Sauce bercy: shallots, white wine, lemon juice, and parsley added to a fish velouté
- Hungarian: onion, paprika, white wine
- Normande sauce: prepared with velouté or fish velouté, cream, butter, and egg yolk as primary ingredients; some versions may use mushroom cooking liquid and oyster liquid or fish fumet added to fish velouté, finished with a liaison of egg yolks and cream.
- Poulette: mushrooms finished with chopped parsley and lemon juice
- Sauce à la polonaise ("Polish-style"): sauce velouté mixed with horseradish, lemon juice, and sour cream (different from Polonaise garnish)
- Sauce ravigote: the addition of a little lemon or white wine vinegar creates a lightly acidic velouté that traditionally is flavored with onions and shallots, and more recently with mustard.
- Sauce vin blanc: has the addition of fish trim, egg yolks, and butter and, typically, it is served with fish.
- Suprême sauce: by adding a reduction of mushroom liquor (produced in cooking) and cream to a chicken velouté
- Venetian sauce: tarragon, shallots, chervil
- Wine sauce: such as white wine sauce and champagne sauce

== See also ==
- List of sauces
