= French mother sauces =

Class of primary sauces in French cooking

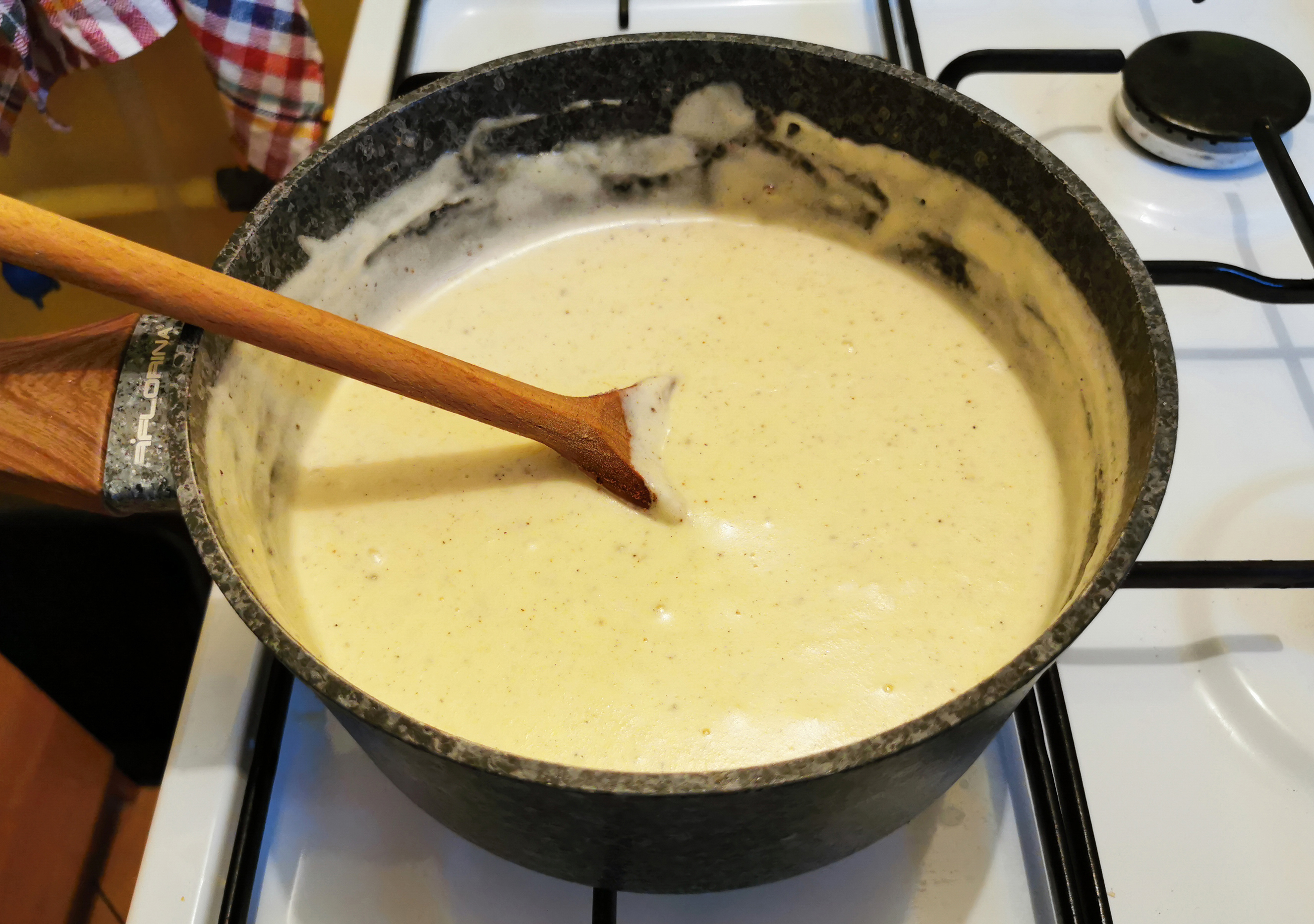
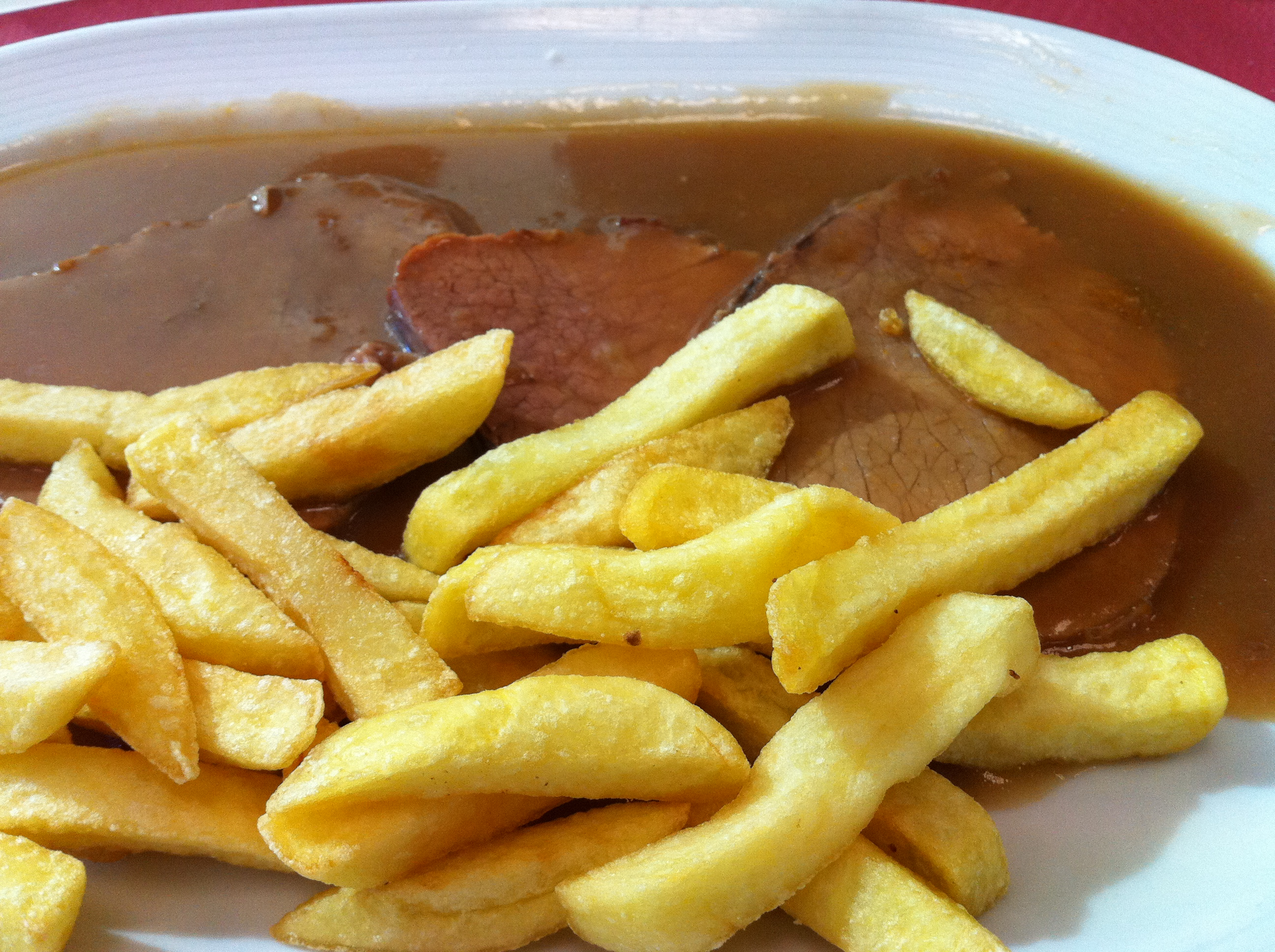
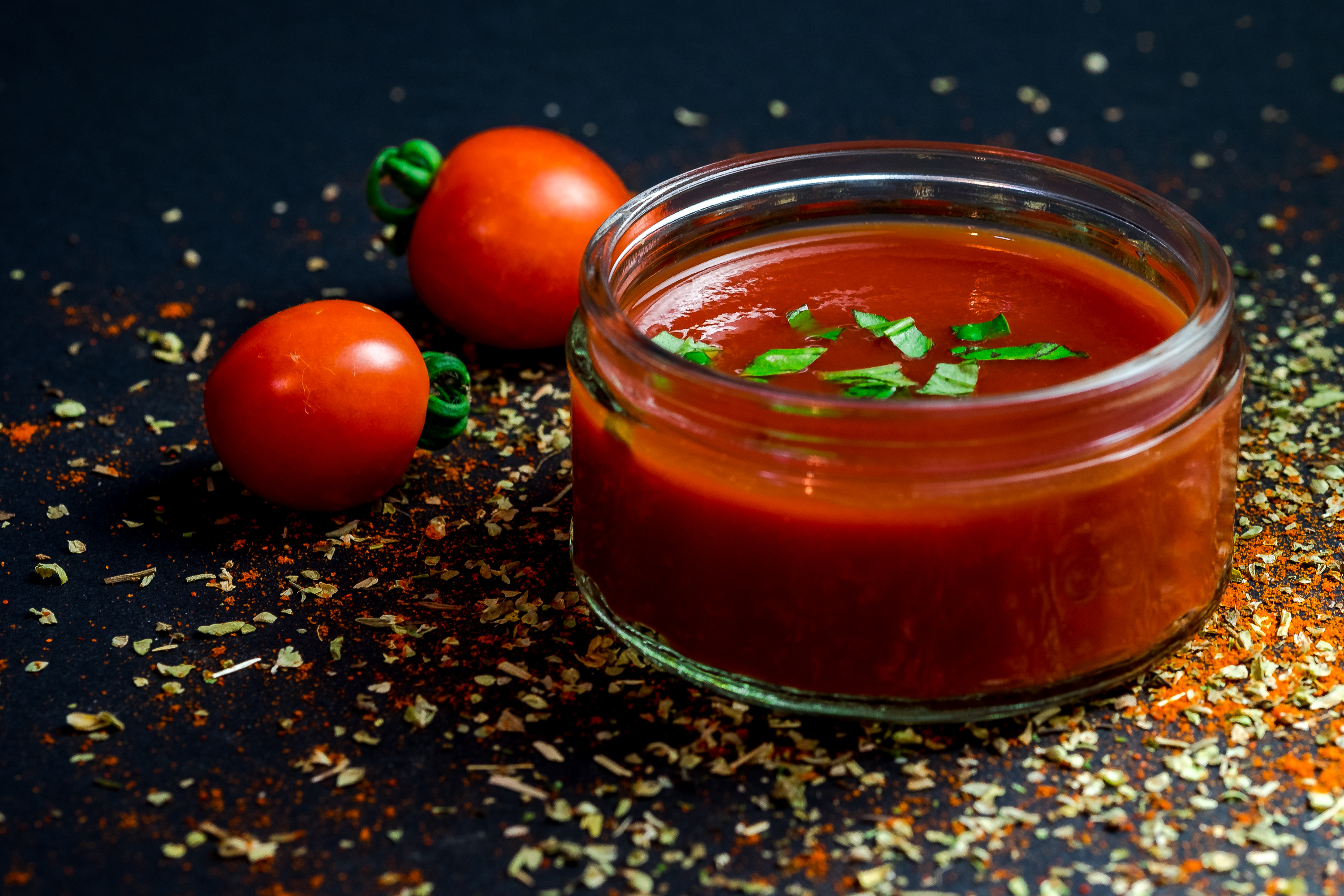
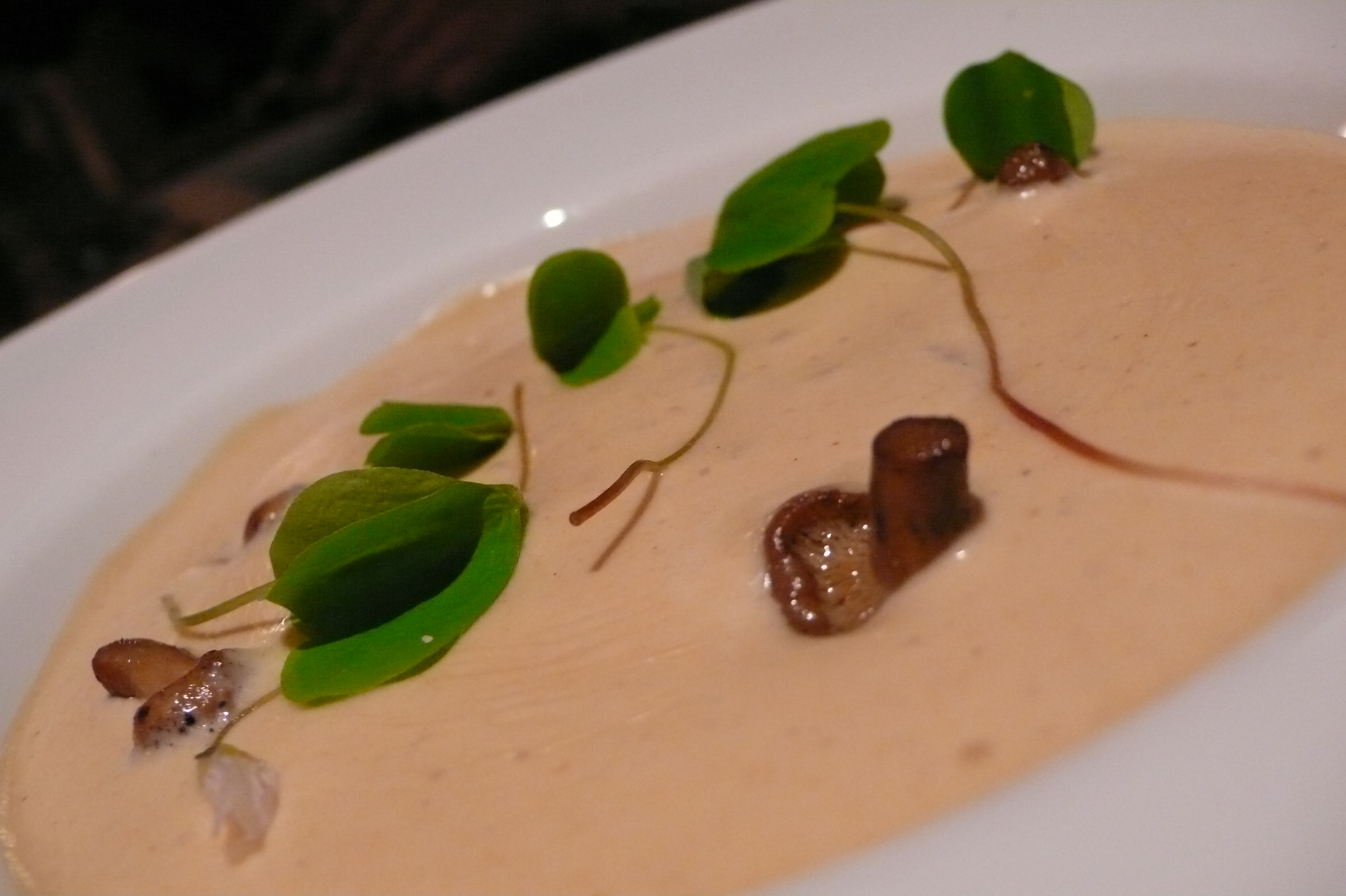
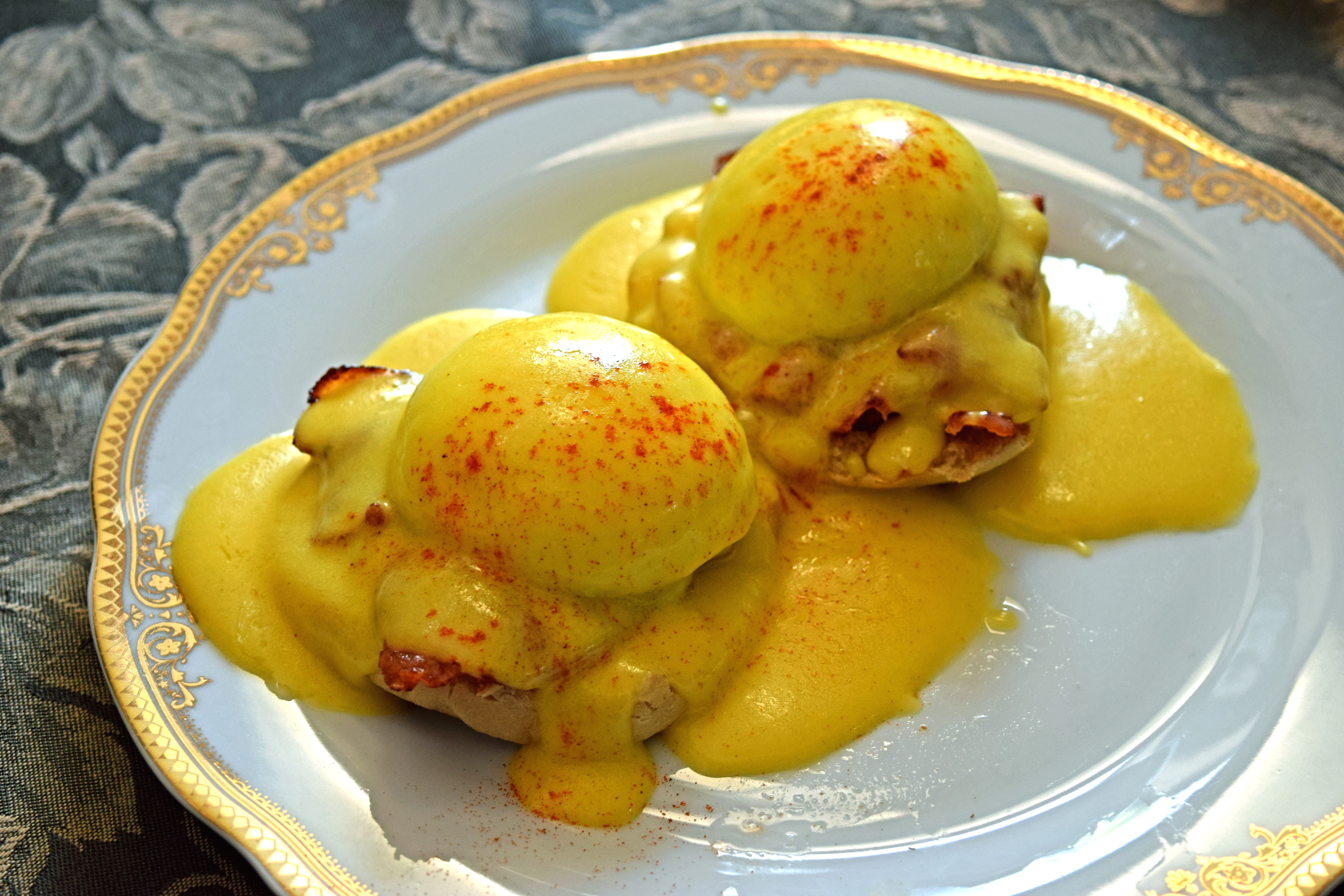
Sauces considered mother sauces. In order (left to right, top to bottom): béchamel, espagnole, tomato, velouté and hollandaise.

In French cuisine, the mother sauces (French: sauces mères, pronounced [sos mɛʁ]), also known as greater sauces (grandes sauces, pronounced [ɡʁɑ̃d sos]), are a group of sauces upon which many other sauces—"daughter sauces" or lesser sauces—are based. Different classifications of mother sauces have been proposed since at least the early 19th century.

== Current use ==
The most common list of mother sauces in contemporary use is béchamel, espagnole, tomato, velouté, and Hollandaise sauce.

=== Béchamel sauce ===
Béchamel is a milk-based sauce, thickened with a white roux and typically flavoured with onion, nutmeg, or thyme.

=== Espagnole sauce ===
Espagnole is a strong-flavoured brown sauce, made from a dark brown roux and a brown stock reduction—usually beef or veal stock—and tomatoes or tomato paste. Ingredients typically include roasted bones or bacon.

=== Velouté sauce ===
Velouté is light in colour, made by reducing clear stock (made from un-roasted bones), usually veal, chicken or fish stock, thickened with a white or blond roux. Velouté is the French word for "velvety".

=== Tomato sauce ===
Sometimes Tomate or Tomat. In addition to tomatoes, ingredients typically include carrots, onion, garlic, butter, and flour, plus pork belly and veal broth. The sauce tomate described by Escoffier is a tomato sauce made with fatty salted pork belly, a mirepoix of carrots, onions and thyme, and white stock.

=== Hollandaise sauce ===
Hollandaise is a warm emulsion based on egg yolk and clarified butter, flavoured with lemon juice or vinegar. In the original 1903 French edition of Le guide culinaire, hollandaise appears on page 150 among the petites sauces (daughter sauces), not among the grandes sauces.

Béarnaise sauce is a derivation of hollandaise.

== History ==
In 1833, Marie-Antoine Carême described four grandes sauces (great sauces). In 1844, the French magazine Revue de Paris reported:

Don’t you know that the grand sauce Espagnole is a mother sauce, of which all the other preparations, such as reductions, stocks, jus, veloutés, essences, and coulis, are, strictly speaking, only derivatives?

— Les Fantaisies du Rocher de Cancale

Different groups of mother and daughter sauces have been proposed by different chefs, varying in number and selection.

Sauce	Carême	Gouffé	Escoffier				Montagné	Common list
	1833	1867	1903	Heinemann	1907	1912	1938	(current)
Allemande	Yes	Yes	Yes	?	Yes	Yes	No	No
Béchamel	Yes	Yes	Yes	Yes	Yes	Yes	Yes	Yes
Demi-glace	No	No	Yes	Yes	Yes	Yes	Yes	No
Espagnole	Yes	Yes	Yes	Yes	Yes	Yes	Yes	Yes
Hollandaise sauce	No	No	No	Yes	No	No	No	Yes
Jus de veau lié	No	No	Yes	No	Yes	Yes	No	No
Poivrade	No	Yes	No	No	No	No	No	No
Marinade	No	Yes	No	No	No	No	No	No
Mayonnaise	No	No	Yes	No	Yes	Yes	Yes	No
Mirepoix	No	No	Yes	No	Yes	No	No	No
Suprême	No	No	Yes	No	Yes	Yes	No	No
Tomato	No	No	Yes	Yes	Yes	Yes	Yes	Yes
Velouté	Yes	Yes	Yes	Yes	Yes	Yes	Yes	Yes

=== Classification by Marie-Antoine Carême (1833) ===
In 1833, Marie-Antoine Carême published a classification of French sauces in his reference cookbook L’art de la cuisine française au XIXe siècle ("The Art of French Cuisine in the 19th Century"). He called them Grandes et Petites sauces ("great and small sauces").

In this cookbook, Carême defined a sauce classification and listed four grandes sauces:

- Espagnole
- Velouté
- Allemande
- Béchamel

Carême classified numerous sauces as petites sauces.

=== Classification by Jules Gouffé (1867) ===
In 1867, the French chef and pâtissier Jules Gouffé published Le livre de cuisine comprenant la grande cuisine et la cuisine de ménage (The Cookbook Including Grand And Domestic Cooking).

In this book, Gouffé listed twelve mother sauces. (He used both the terms grandes sauces and sauce mères).

- Espagnole Grasse (Fattier Espagnole)
- Espagnole Maigre (Leaner Espagnole)
- Velouté Gras (Fattier Velouté)
- Velouté Maigre (Leaner Velouté)
- Allemande (Velouté thickened with eggs)
- Béchamel à l’ancienne (Old Fashioned Béchamel)
- Béchamel de volaille (Poultry Béchamel)
- Béchamel maigre (Leaner Béchamel)
- Poivrade brune (Brown Poivrade)
- Poivrade Blanche (White Poivrade)
- Poivrade Maigre (Leaner Poivrade)
- Marinade

=== Classification by Auguste Escoffier (1903) ===
The pioneering chef Auguste Escoffier is credited with establishing the importance of Espagnole, Velouté, Béchamel and Tomate, as well as Hollandaise and Mayonnaise. His book Le guide culinaire was published in 1903. It lists numerous "Grandes Sauces de base", including espagnole, velouté, béchamel, and tomate as well as others such as mirepoix and jus de veau lié (thickened veal stock).

The original French editions of Le guide culinaire listed Hollandaise as a daughter sauce rather than a grande sauce. Mayonnaise, in the chapter on cold sauces, was described as a mother sauce for cold sauces, and compared to Espagnole and Velouté. The 1907 English edition removed this description of mayonnaise entirely, replacing it with hollandaise among the basic sauces — the likely origin of the modern five-sauce list.

The 1907 English edition of Le guide culinaire, A Guide to Modern Cookery, listed fewer "basic sauces", including Hollandaise alongside espagnole, "half glaze" (demi glace), velouté, allemande, béchamel, and tomate. The English edition did not describe mayonnaise as a mother sauce, and included the sentence that "Allemande Sauce is not, strictly speaking, a basic sauce".

== See also ==
- List of sauces
- Obe ata, a West African sauce used as a mother sauce
