= Meat glaze =

Gelatinous food flavouring agent

Meat glaze (French: glace de viande) is a dark brown, gelatinous flavouring agent used in food preparation. It is obtained by reducing brown stock through evaporation by slow heating. Compared to demi-glace, meat glaze is about twice as concentrated. Its high viscosity and salt content gives it an unusually long shelf life.

Meat glaze is used to add flavor to soups.

== See also ==
- Demi-glace
