= Le guide culinaire =

1903 cookbook by Auguste Escoffier

Le Guide Culinaire
- 2001 printing of 4th edition in French
- Author: Auguste Escoffier
- Language: French
- Subject: Culinary Arts
- Genre: non-fiction
- Publisher: Editions Flammarion
- Publication date: 1903
- Publication place: France
- Media type: book
- Pages: 943
- ISBN: 2-08-200803-7 (2001 printing)
- OCLC: 30633064

Le Guide Culinaire (French pronunciation: [lə ɡid kylinɛːʁ]) is Georges Auguste Escoffier's 1903 French restaurant cuisine cookbook, his first. It is regarded as a classic and still in print. Escoffier developed the recipes while working at the Savoy, Ritz and Carlton hotels from the late 1880s to the time of publication. The hotels and restaurants Escoffier worked in were on the cutting edge of modernity, doing away with many overwrought elements of the Victorian era while serving the elite of society.

== History ==
The first edition was printed in 1903 in French, the second edition was published in 1907, the third in 1912, and the current fourth edition in 1921.

Many of the recipes Escoffier developed while working at the Savoy in London, and later the Ritz in Paris. He kept notes on note cards. Recipes were often created and named for famous patrons including royalty, nouveaux riches, and artists. After leaving the Savoy in 1898, he began work on the book.

== Usage and style ==
The original text was printed for the use of professional chefs and kitchen staff; Escoffier's introduction to the first edition explains his intention that Le Guide Culinaire be used toward the education of the younger generation of cooks. This usage of the book still holds today; many culinary schools still use it as their culinary textbook.

Its style is to give recipes as brief descriptions and to assume that the reader either knows or can look up the keywords in the description.

== English and other editions ==
English translation of 4th edition

An abridged, English translation of Le guide Culinaire 1e – 1903, was published in 1907 as A Guide to Modern Cookery. A second edition of the translation was published in 1957 with an additional introduction by Eugène Herbodeau.

An English translation of Le Guide Culinaire 4e – 1921, by H. L. Cracknell and R. J. Kaufmann, was published in 1979 as The Complete Guide to the Art of Modern Cookery: The First Translation into English in Its Entirety of Le Guide Culinaire, including "some 2,000 additional recipes" omitted from the more than 5000 recipes of the 1907 translation. The 1979 translation was subsequently republished as Escoffier: The Complete Guide to the Art of Modern Cookery (1983), and a revised second edition with new forewords was published as Escoffier: Le Guide Culinaire, Revised (2011).

Le Répertoire de la cuisine, written by Escoffier's student Louis Saulnier and Théophile Gringoire, and published in 1914, is considered a companion guide to Le Guide Culinaire by Escoffier.
