= Demi-glace =

Sauce in French cuisine

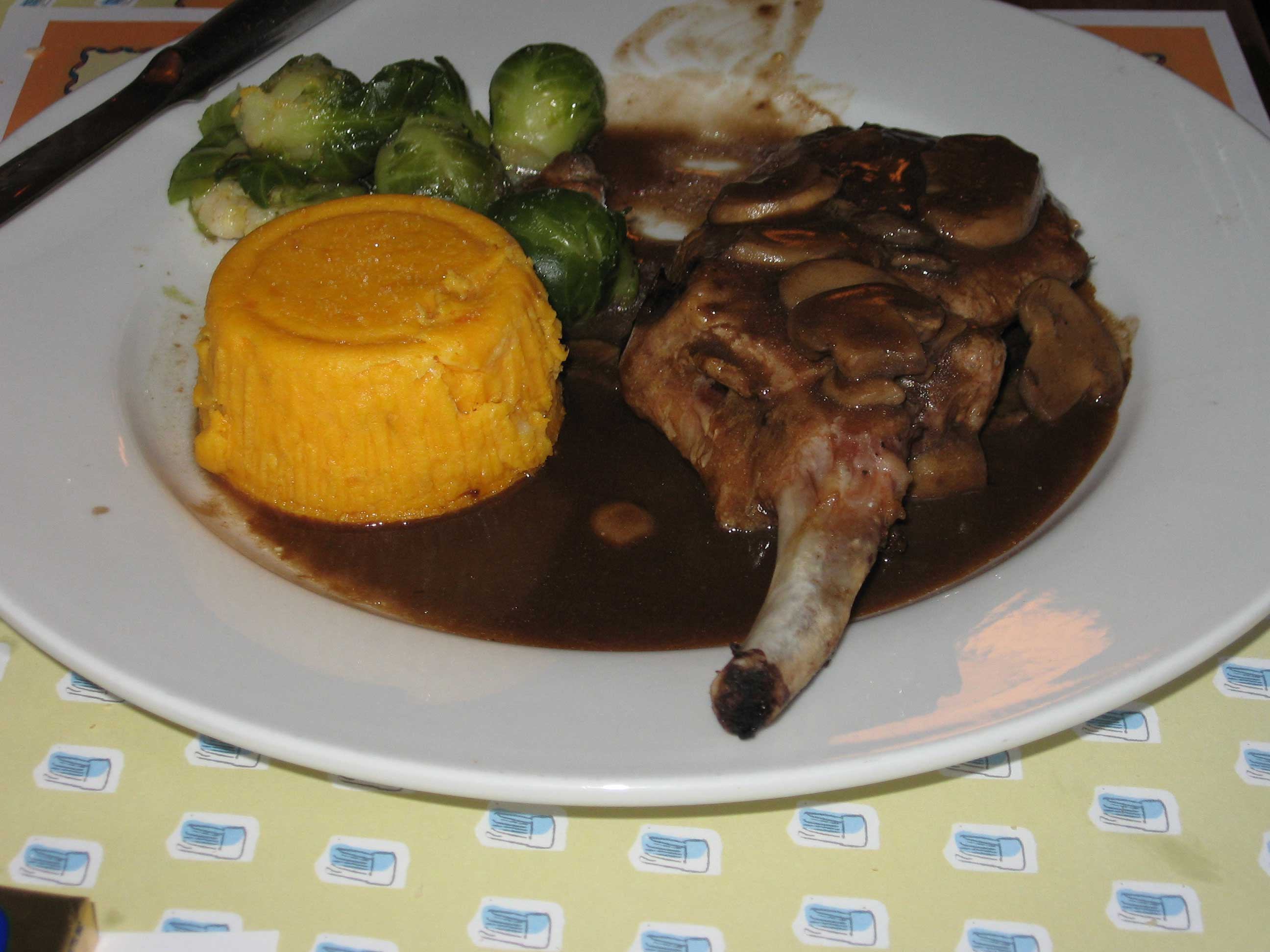
- A pork chop with brussels sprouts, a sweet potato purée, and a mushroom demi-glace
- Type: Sauce
- Place of origin: France
- Main ingredients: beef or chicken stock
- Variations: demi-glace au bœuf, demi-glace au poulet

Demi-glace (French pronunciation: [dəmi ɡlas], lit. 'half-glaze') is a rich brown sauce in French cuisine used by itself or as a base for other sauces. The term comes from the French word glace, which, when used in reference to a sauce, means "icing" or "glaze". It is traditionally made by combining one part espagnole sauce and one part brown stock. The sauce is then reduced by half, strained of any leftover impurities, and finished with a sherry wine.

Common variants of demi-glace use a 1:1 mixture of beef or chicken stock to sauce espagnole; these are referred to as "beef demi-glace" (demi-glace au bœuf) or "chicken demi-glace" (demi-glace au poulet).

== Preparation ==
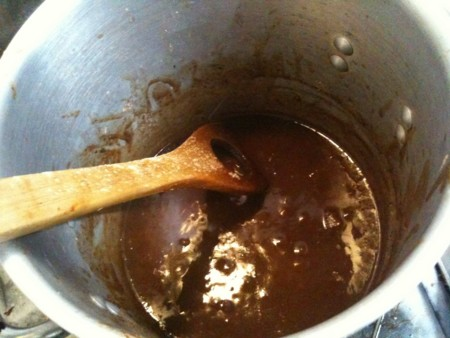
Demi-glace being reduced

Due to the considerable effort involved in making the traditional demi-glace, chefs commonly substitute a simple jus lié of veal stock to create a simulated version, which the American cookbook author Julia Child referred to as a "semi-demi-glace" (i.e. sans espagnole sauce).

== See also ==
- Gypsy sauce
- List of sauces
- Meat glaze
