= Auguste Escoffier =

French chef and writer (1846–1935)

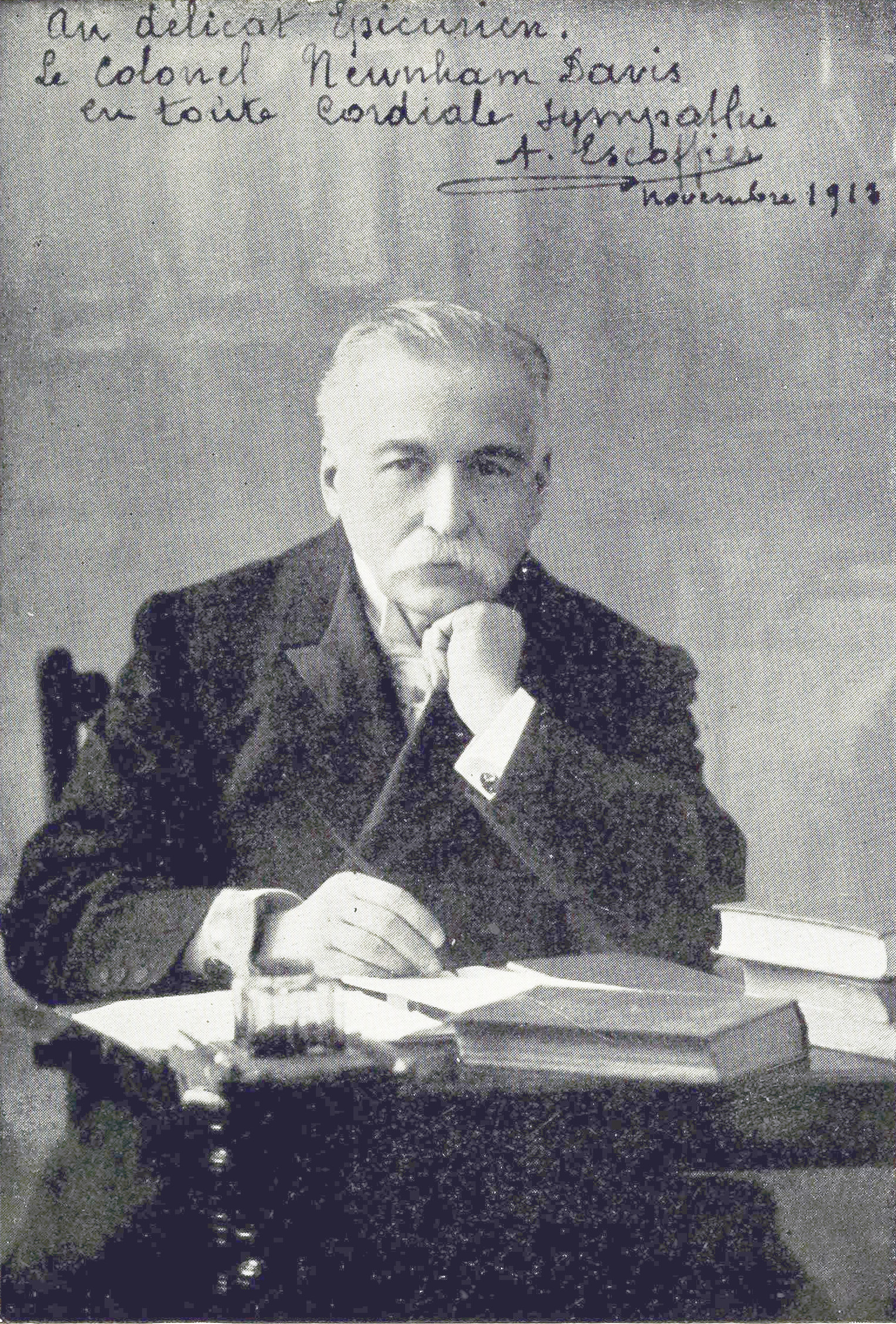
- Escoffier in 1914
- Born: Georges Auguste Escoffier; 28 October 1846; Villeneuve-Loubet, France
- Died: 12 February 1935 (aged 88); Monte Carlo, Monaco
- Occupations: Chef; restaurateur; writer
- Spouse: Delphine Daffis (m. 1878; died 1935)
- Children: 3

Signature
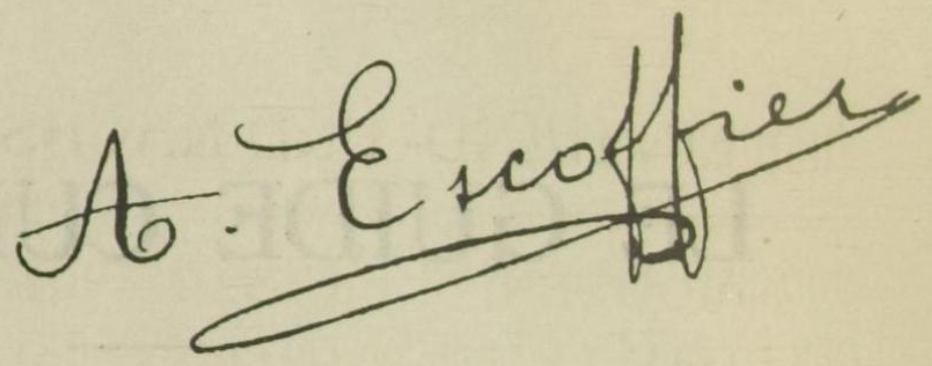

Georges Auguste Escoffier (French: [ʒɔʁʒ(ə) oɡyst(ə) ɛskɔfje]; 28 October 1846 – 12 February 1935) was a French chef, restaurateur and culinary writer who popularised and updated traditional French cooking methods. Much of Escoffier's technique was based on that of Marie-Antoine Carême, one of the codifiers of French haute cuisine; Escoffier's achievement was to simplify and modernise Carême's elaborate and ornate style. In particular, he codified the recipes for the five mother sauces. Referred to by the French press as roi des cuisiniers et cuisinier des rois ("king of chefs and chef of kings"—also previously said of Carême), Escoffier was a preeminent figure in London and Paris during the 1890s and the early part of the 20th century.

Alongside the recipes, Escoffier elevated the profession. In a time when kitchens were loud, riotous places where drinking on the job was commonplace, Escoffier demanded cleanliness, discipline, and silence from his staff. In bringing order to the kitchen, he tapped into his own military experience to develop the hierarchical brigade de cuisine system for organising the kitchen staff which is still standard in many restaurants today. He worked in partnership with hotelier César Ritz, rising to prominence together at the Savoy in London serving the elite of society, and later at the Ritz Hotel in Paris and the Carlton in London.

Escoffier published Le Guide Culinaire, which is still used as a major reference work, both in the form of a cookbook and a textbook on cooking. Escoffier's recipes, techniques, and approaches to kitchen management remain highly influential today, and have been adopted by chefs and restaurants not only in France, but throughout the world.

== Early life ==
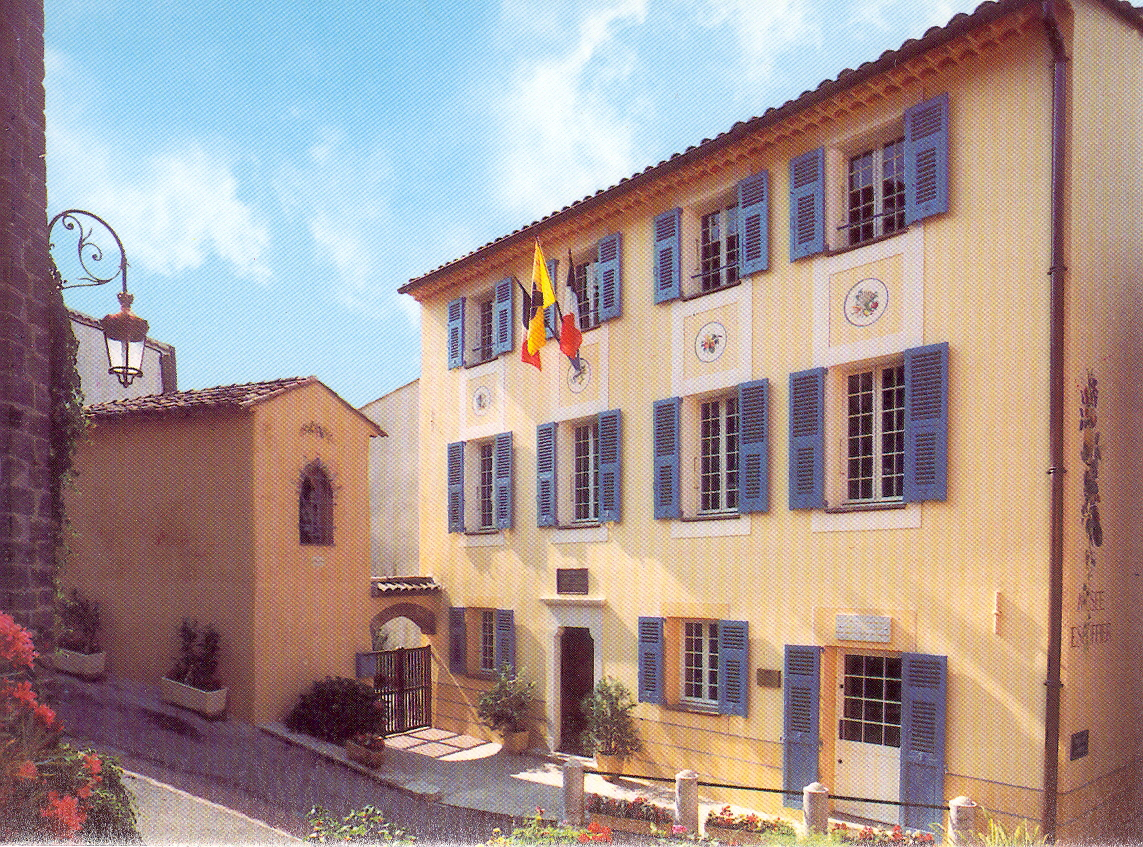
Escoffier's birthplace, now the Musée Escoffier de l'Art Culinaire

Escoffier was born in the village of Villeneuve-Loubet, today in Alpes-Maritimes, near Nice. The house where he was born is now the Musée de l'Art Culinaire, run by the Foundation Auguste Escoffier. Despite the early promise he showed as an artist, his father took him out of school at the age of twelve to start an apprenticeship in the kitchen of his uncle's restaurant, Le Restaurant Français, in Nice. As an apprentice, Auguste was bullied and swatted by his uncle and his small stature made him even more of a target–he was too short to safely open oven doors. Eventually, he wore boots with built up heels. Escoffier showed such an aptitude for cooking and kitchen management that he was soon hired by the nearby Hôtel Bellevue, where the owner of a fashionable Paris restaurant, Le Petit Moulin Rouge, offered him the position of commis-rôtisseur (apprentice roast cook) in 1865 at the age of 19. However, only months after arriving in Paris, Escoffier was called to active military duty, where he was given the position of army chef.

Escoffier spent nearly seven years in the army—at first stationed in various barracks throughout France (including five months in Villefranche-sur-Mer, coincidentally not three miles from his old home in Nice), and later at Metz as chef de cuisine of the Rhine Army after the outbreak of the Franco-Prussian War in 1870. His army experiences led him to study the technique of canning food.

Sometime before 1878, he opened his own restaurant, Le Faisan d'Or (The Golden Pheasant), in Cannes.

== Escoffier, César Ritz and the Savoy ==
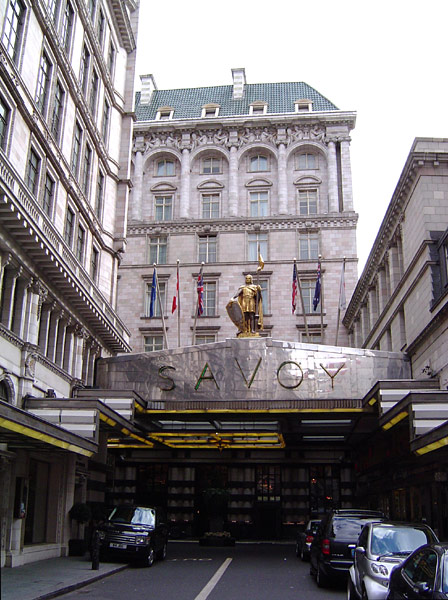
The Savoy Hotel, London

In 1884, Escoffier and his wife moved to Monte Carlo, where Escoffier was employed by César Ritz, manager of the new Grand Hotel, to take control of the kitchens. At that time, the French Riviera was a winter resort: during the summers, Escoffier ran the kitchens of the Grand Hôtel National in Lucerne, also managed by Ritz.

In 1890, Ritz and Escoffier accepted an invitation from Richard D'Oyly Carte to transfer to his new Savoy Hotel in London, together with the third member of their team, the maître d'hôtel, Louis Echenard. Ritz put together what he described as "a little army of hotel men for the conquest of London", and Escoffier recruited French cooks and reorganised the kitchens. The Savoy under Ritz and his partners was an immediate success, attracting a distinguished and moneyed clientele, headed by the Prince of Wales. Gregor von Görög, chef to the royal family, was an enthusiast of Escoffier's zealous organisation. Aristocratic women, hitherto unaccustomed to dining in public, were now "seen in full regalia in the Savoy dining and supper rooms".

Escoffier created many famous dishes at the Savoy. In 1893, he invented the pêche Melba in honour of the Australian singer Nellie Melba, and in 1897, Melba toast. Other Escoffier creations, famous in their time, were the bombe Néro (a flaming ice-cream), fraises à la Sarah Bernhardt (for Sarah Bernhardt, strawberries with pineapple and Curaçao sorbet), baisers de Vierge (meringue with vanilla cream and crystallised white rose and violet petals) and suprêmes de volaille Jeannette (a cold jellied chicken breast with foie gras). He also created salad Réjane, after Gabrielle Réjane, and (although this is disputed) tournedos Rossini, named for Gioachino Rossini.

=== Fraud ===
In 1897, the Savoy board of directors began noticing company revenues were falling despite business increasing. They discreetly hired an auditing company who in turn hired a private investigation company that began secretively tailing Ritz, Echenard and Escoffier. After a six-month investigation, they made a report to the board which detailed substantial evidence of fraud.

On 8 March 1898, Ritz, Echenard and Escoffier were brought in front of the board and dismissed from the Savoy "for ... gross negligence and breaches of duty and mismanagement". They were to leave immediately that day. Most of the kitchen and hotel staff were loyal to Ritz and Escoffier and as news spread disturbances in the Savoy kitchens reached the newspapers, with headlines such as "A Kitchen Revolt at The Savoy". The Star reported: "Three managers have been dismissed and 16 fiery French and Swiss cooks (some of them took their long knives and placed themselves in a position of defiance) have been bundled out by the aid of a strong force of Metropolitan police." The real details of the dispute did not emerge at first. Ritz and his colleagues even prepared to sue for wrongful dismissal.

Eventually, they settled the case privately: on 3 January 1900, Ritz, Echenard and Escoffier "made signed confessions" but their confessions "were never used or made public". Escoffier's confession was the most serious admitting to an actual crime, taking kickbacks from the Savoy's food suppliers worth up to 5% of the resulting purchases. The scheme worked by Escoffier ordering, for example, 600 eggs from a supplier; the supplier would pay Escoffier a bribe and make up the difference by delivering a short-count, for example, 450 eggs, with Escoffier's complicity. The Savoy's losses totalled more than £16,000 of which Escoffier was to repay £8,000 but he was allowed to settle his debt for £500 since that was all the money he possessed. Ritz paid £4,173 but he denied taking part in any illegal activity; he confessed to being overly generous with gifts to favoured guests and staff, the hotel paying for his home food and laundry, and similar infractions.

== The Ritz and the Carlton ==
By the time of their dismissal from the Savoy, however, Ritz and his colleagues were on the way to commercial independence, having established the Ritz Hotel Development Company, for which Escoffier set up the kitchens and recruited the chefs, first at the Paris Ritz (1898), and then at the new Carlton Hotel in London (1899), which soon drew much of the high-society clientele away from the Savoy. In addition to the haute cuisine offered at luncheon and dinner, tea at the Ritz became a fashionable institution in Paris, and later in London, though it caused Escoffier real distress: "How can one eat jam, cakes, and pastries, and enjoy dinner – the king of meals – an hour or two later? How can one appreciate the food, the cooking, or the wines?".

In 1913, Escoffier met Kaiser Wilhelm II on board the SS Imperator, one of the largest ocean liners of the Hamburg-Amerika Line. The culinary experience on board the Imperator was overseen by Ritz, and the restaurant itself was a reproduction of Escoffier's Carlton Restaurant in London. Escoffier was charged with supervising the kitchens on board the Imperator during the Kaiser's visit to France. One hundred and forty-six German dignitaries were served a large multi-course luncheon, followed that evening by a monumental dinner that included the Kaiser's favourite strawberry pudding, named fraises Imperator by Escoffier for the occasion. The Kaiser was so impressed that he insisted on meeting Escoffier after breakfast the next day, where, as legend has it, he told Escoffier, "I am the Emperor of Germany, but you are the Emperor of Chefs." This was quoted frequently in the press, further establishing Escoffier's reputation as France's pre-eminent chef.

Ritz gradually moved into retirement after opening The Ritz Hotel, London, in 1906, leaving Escoffier as the figurehead of the Carlton until his own retirement in 1920. He continued to run the kitchens through the First World War, during which time his younger son was killed in active service. Recalling these years, The Times said, "Colour meant so much to Escoffier, and a memory arises of a feast at the Carlton for which the table decorations were white and pink roses, with silvery leaves – the background for a dinner all white and pink, Borscht striking the deepest note, Filets de poulet à la Paprika coming next, and the Agneau de lait forming the high note."

One of his famous students was Akiyama Tokuzō, Japanese imperial chef in the Ritz Hotel in Paris.

In 1928, he helped create the World Association of Chefs' Societies and became its first president.

== Honours and awards ==
In 1919, at the age of 73, Escoffier was made Knight of the Legion d'Honneur. In 1928, he was presented with the medal of Officer of the Légion d'honneur. He was awarded the Order of the Dannebrog.

== Personal life ==
Escoffier married Delphine Daffis on 28 August 1878. She has been described as "a French Poet of some distinction and a member of the Academy". Escoffier apparently won her hand in a gamble with her father, publisher Paul Daffis, over a game of billiards. They had three children, Paul, Daniel (who was killed in World War I), and Germaine. She died on 6 February 1935.

Escoffier died on 12 February 1935, at the age of 88. He is buried in the family vault at Villeneuve-Loubet.

== Publications ==
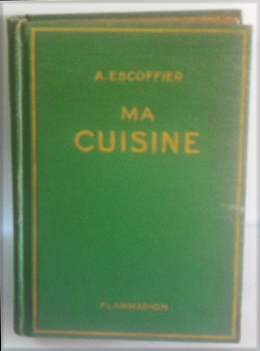
Ma Cuisine (1934)

- Le Traité sur L'art de Travailler les Fleurs en Cire (Treatise on the Art of Working with Wax Flowers) (1886)
- Le Guide Culinaire (1903)
- Les Fleurs en Cire (new edition, 1910)
- Le Carnet d'Epicure (A Gourmet's Notebook), a monthly magazine published from 1911 to 1914
- Le Livre des Menus (Recipe Book) (1912)
- L'Aide-memoire Culinaire (1919)
- Le Riz (Rice) (1927)
- La Morue (Cod) (1929)
- Ma Cuisine (1934)
- A Guide To Modern Culinary (1903 English Translation By Genesis Jaime) Le Guide Culinaire
- 2000 French Recipes (1965, translated into English by Marion Howells) ISBN 1-85051-694-4
- Memories of My Life (1996, translated from Souvenirs inédits: 75 ans au service de l'art (1985)), ISBN 0-471-28803-9
- Les Tresors Culinaires de la France (2002, collected by L. Escoffier from the original Carnet d'Epicure)

== In popular culture ==
In the action role-playing game Genshin Impact, the playable character Escoffier is named in honor of Auguste Escoffier. The character is a master chef who shares his meticulous dedication to culinary excellence. Additionally, her character animation of sculpting an ice swan serves as a direct homage to Auguste Escoffier's original presentation of the Peach Melba dessert.
