= Honey garlic sauce =

Sweet and sour sauce

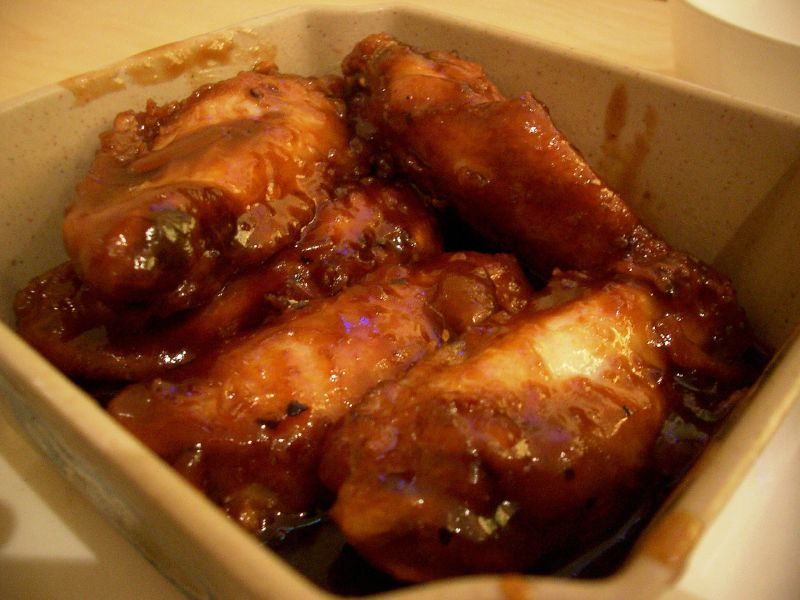
Chicken wings with honey-garlic sauce

Honey garlic sauce is a sweet and sour sauce that tastes like a mix between honey and garlic, popular in Canada. Honey garlic is one of the many sauces put on chicken wings, ribs, and other foods such as meatballs.

== See also ==
- Garlic sauce
- Agliata – a garlic sauce in Italian cuisine
- Aioli
- Buffalo wings
- Canadian cuisine
- List of garlic dishes
- List of sauces
- Teriyaki – similar to the sauce in Japanese cuisine, also seen in Canada
- Toum
