= Aioli (disambiguation) =

Aioli is a mediterranean sauce based on garlic.

Aioli may also refer to:

- L'Aiòli, a Provençal newspaper founded in 1891
- Aïoli garni, a traditional Provençal dish

== See also ==
- Aeolia (disambiguation)
