= List of garlic dishes =

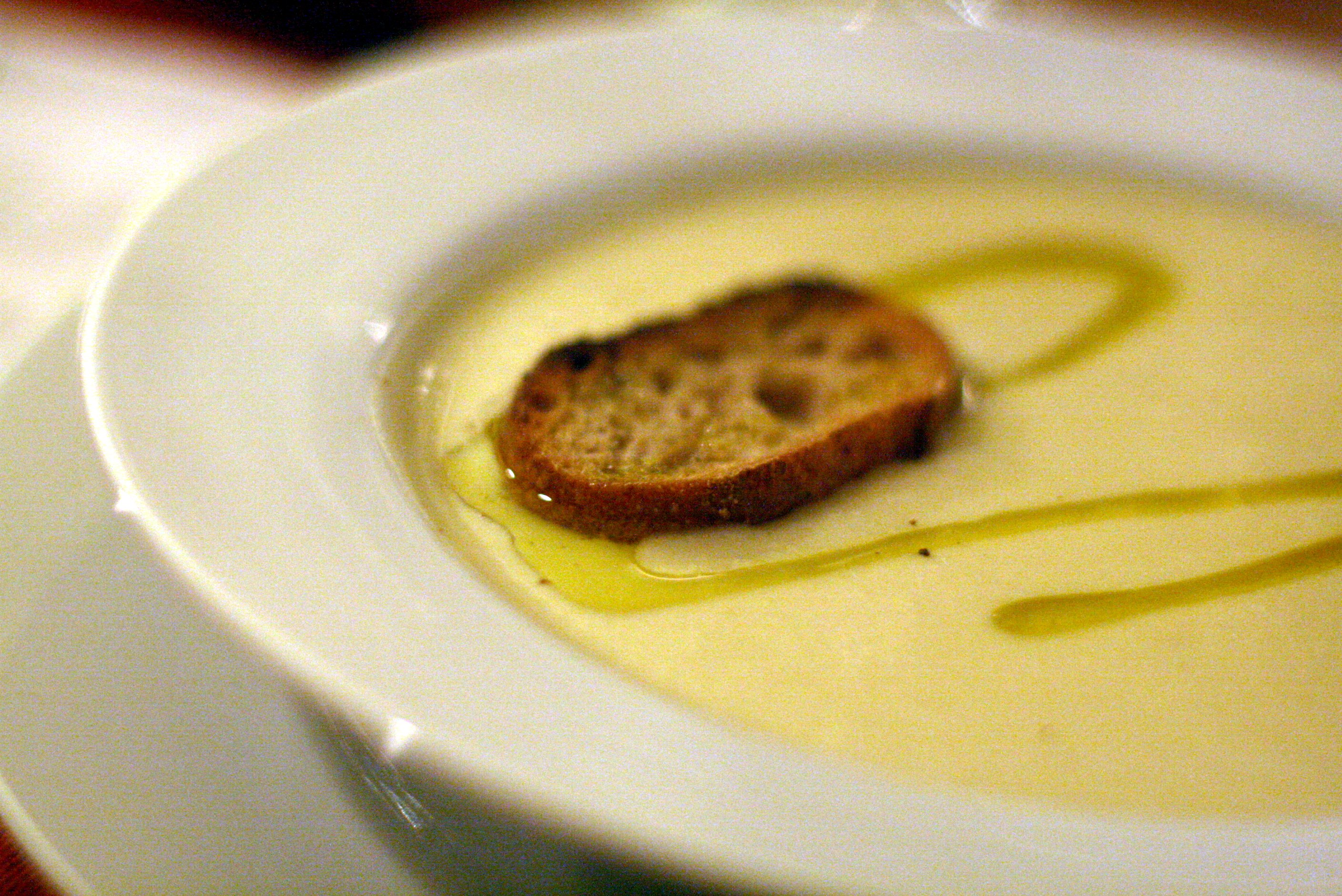
Green garlic soup

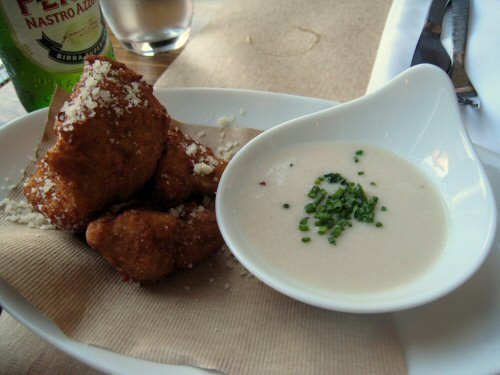
Agliata sauce (right) with fried cauliflower

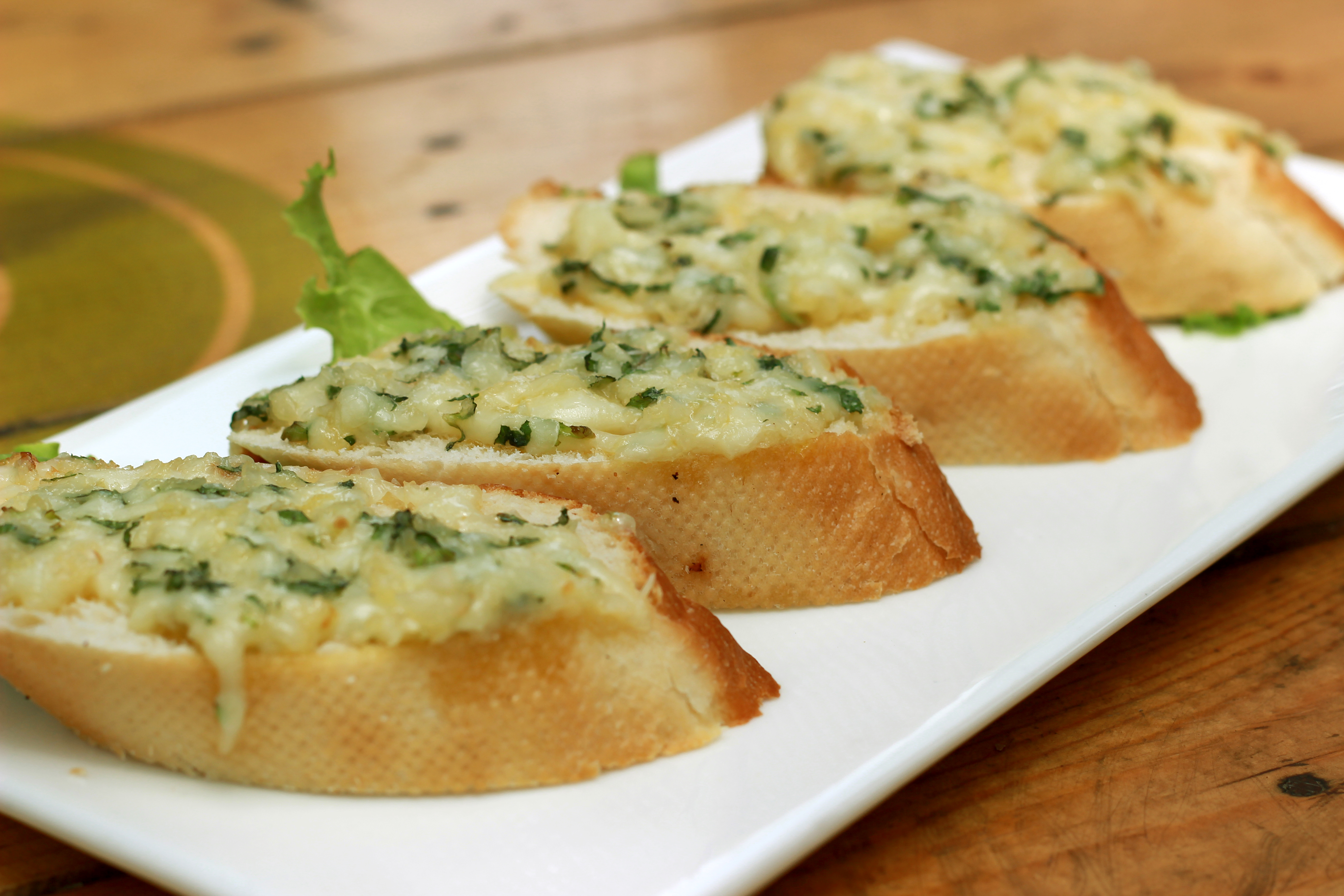
Garlic bread

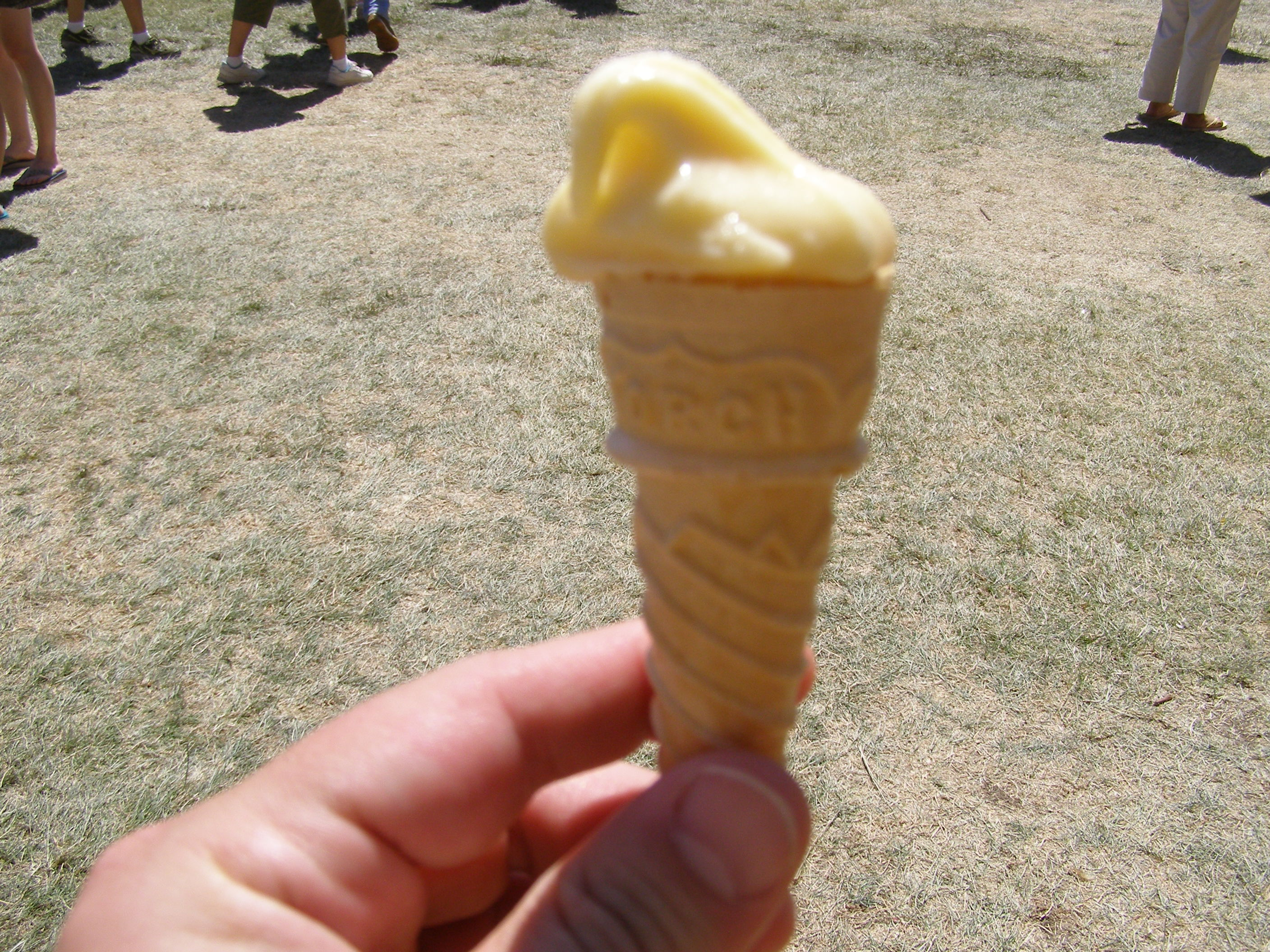
Garlic ice cream

This is a list of garlic dishes, comprising dishes and foods that use garlic as a main ingredient. Garlic is a species in the onion genus, Allium. Its close relatives include the onion, shallot, leek, chive, and Chinese onion. Garlic is native to Central Asia and northeastern Iran, has a history of several thousand years of human consumption and use, and has long been used as a seasoning worldwide. It was known to Ancient Egyptians, and has been used both as a food flavoring and as a traditional medicine.

== Garlic dishes ==
- Agliata – a savory and pungent garlic sauce and condiment in Italian cuisine used to flavor and accompany broiled or boiled meats, fish and vegetables.
- Aioli – a Mediterranean sauce made of garlic and olive oil; in some regions other emulsifiers such as eggs are used.
- Bagna càuda – a dish from Piedmont, Italy, made of garlic, anchovies, olive oil and butter, it is served and consumed in a manner similar to fondue.
- Black garlic – garlic aged in a heated, moist, controlled environment over time so the sugars caramelize and the cloves turn black.
- Česnečka – a garlic soup in Czech cuisine and Slovak cuisine consisting of a thin broth, a significant amount of garlic, sliced potatoes and spices such as caraway, marjoram and cumin.
- Garlic bread
- Garlic butter
- Garlic chutney – prepared using fresh garlic, dry or fresh coconut, groundnuts and green or red chili peppers, additional ingredients are also sometimes used.
- Garlic fingers – an Atlantic Canadian dish similar in shape and size to a pizza and made with the same type of dough, instead of being cut in triangular slices, they are presented in thin strips, or "fingers".
- Garlic ice cream – has been a dish at many garlic festivals
- Garlic Noodles – a noodle dish that originated in San Francisco, California
- Garlic oil
- Garlic rice – a Filipino fried rice dish made from stir-frying garlic and stale leftover cooked rice, and seasoned with salt.
- Garlic sauce – typically a pungent sauce, with the depth of garlic flavor determined by the amount of garlic used
- Garlic sausage – prepared using garlic and pork or beef/veal, or a combination of pork and beef.
- Garlic soup – many versions exist worldwide
- Ginger garlic masala – a crushed mixture of raw ginger and garlic cloves
- Garlic vinegar
- Honey garlic sauce
- Laba garlic – a vinegar-preserved garlic with a refined green coloration and a sour and slightly spicy flavor, its name derives from typically being prepared on December 8 of the lunar calendar (lunar month December the eighth, the Laba Festival, a traditional Chinese holiday).
- Mujdei – a spicy Romanian sauce made from garlic cloves crushed and ground into a paste, salted and mixed energetically with water and vegetable oil.
- Persillade – a sauce or seasoning mixture of parsley chopped together with seasonings including garlic, herbs, oil, and vinegar.
- Pistou – a Provençal cold sauce made from cloves of garlic, fresh basil, and olive oil. It is somewhat similar to the Ligurian sauce pesto, although it lacks pine nuts.
- Skordalia – a thick puree in Greek cuisine made by combining crushed garlic with a bulky base, such as a purée of potatoes, walnuts, almonds or liquid-soaked stale bread, and then beating the mixture in olive oil to make a smooth emulsion. Vinegar is often added.
- Smoked garlic
- Toum – a garlic sauce common to the Levant, it is similar to Provençal aioli, and contains garlic, salt, olive oil or vegetable oil, and lemon juice. It is traditionally crushed together using a wooden mortar and pestle.
- Vanillerostbraten – an Austrian beef cutlet dish prepared with garlic, salt, pepper, butter, onions, and brown bouillon and normally served with fried potatoes

== Gallery ==
Garlic dishes and foods

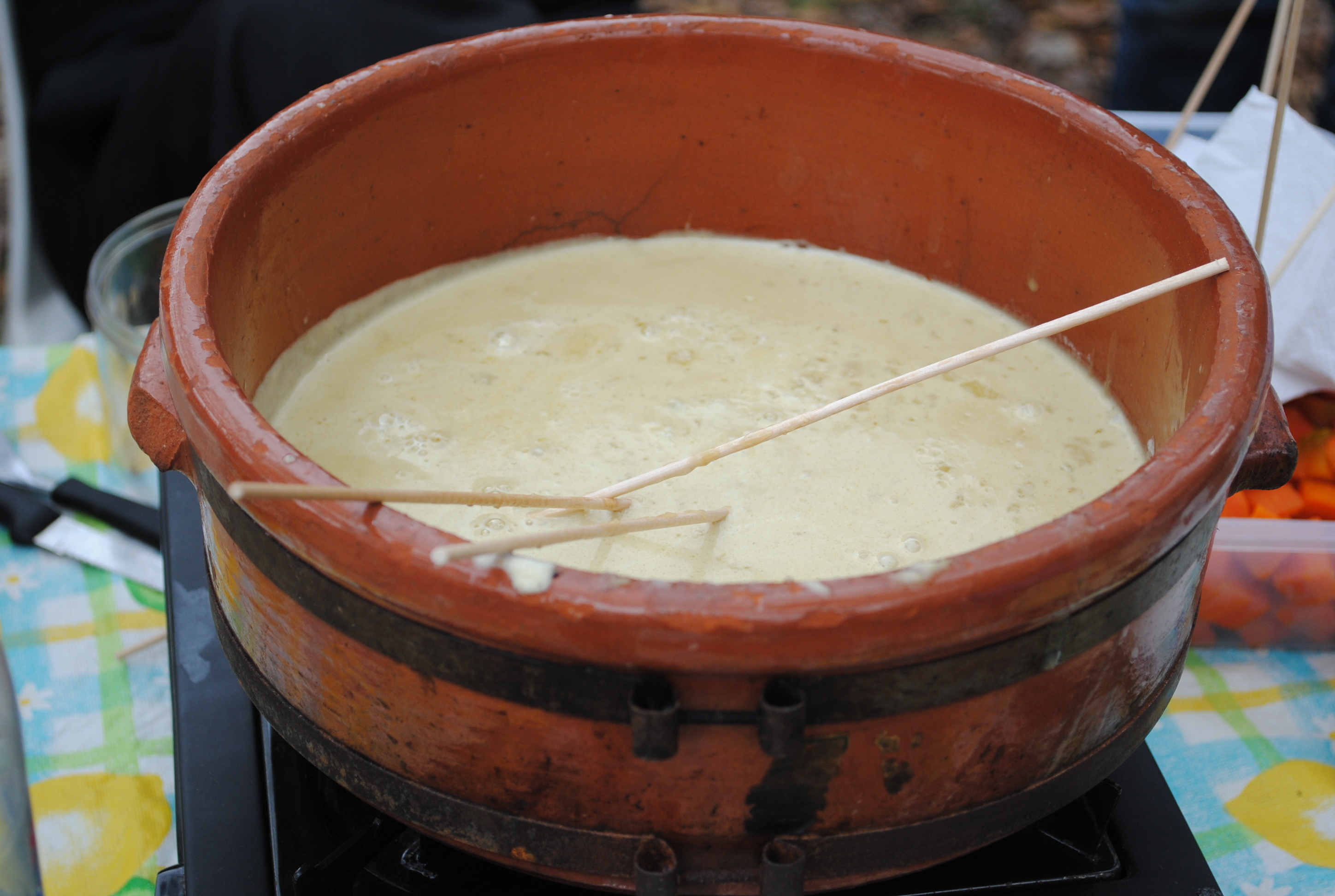
Bagna càuda

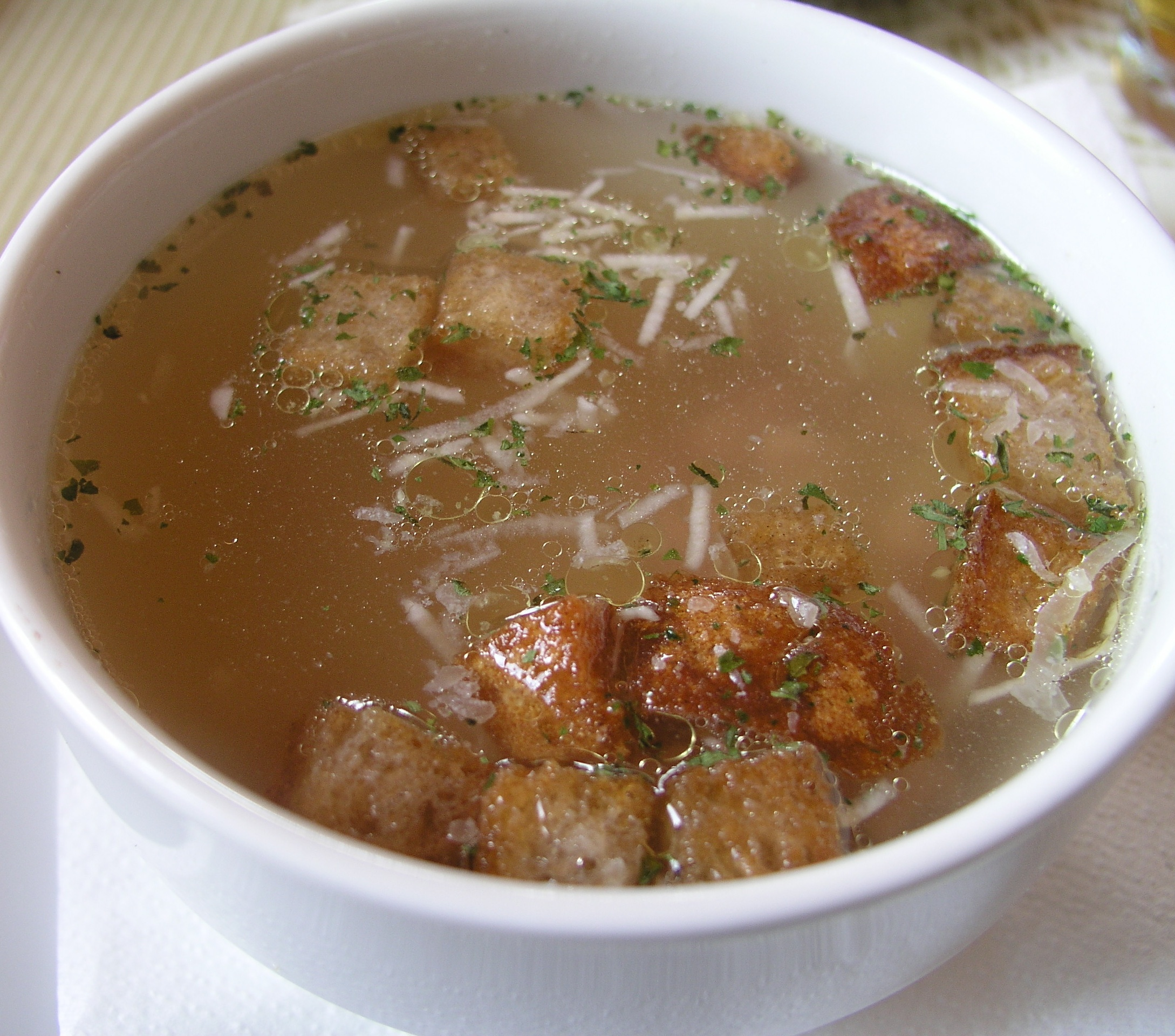
Česnečka at a restaurant in Hrádek nad Nisou, Czech Republic

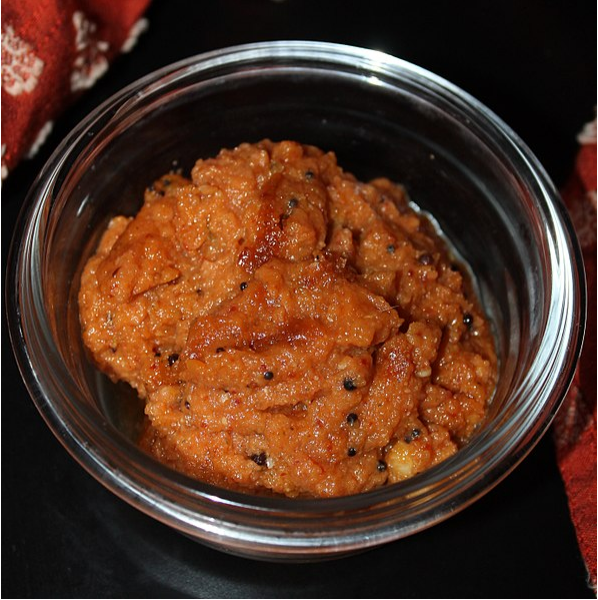
A garlic chutney in South India

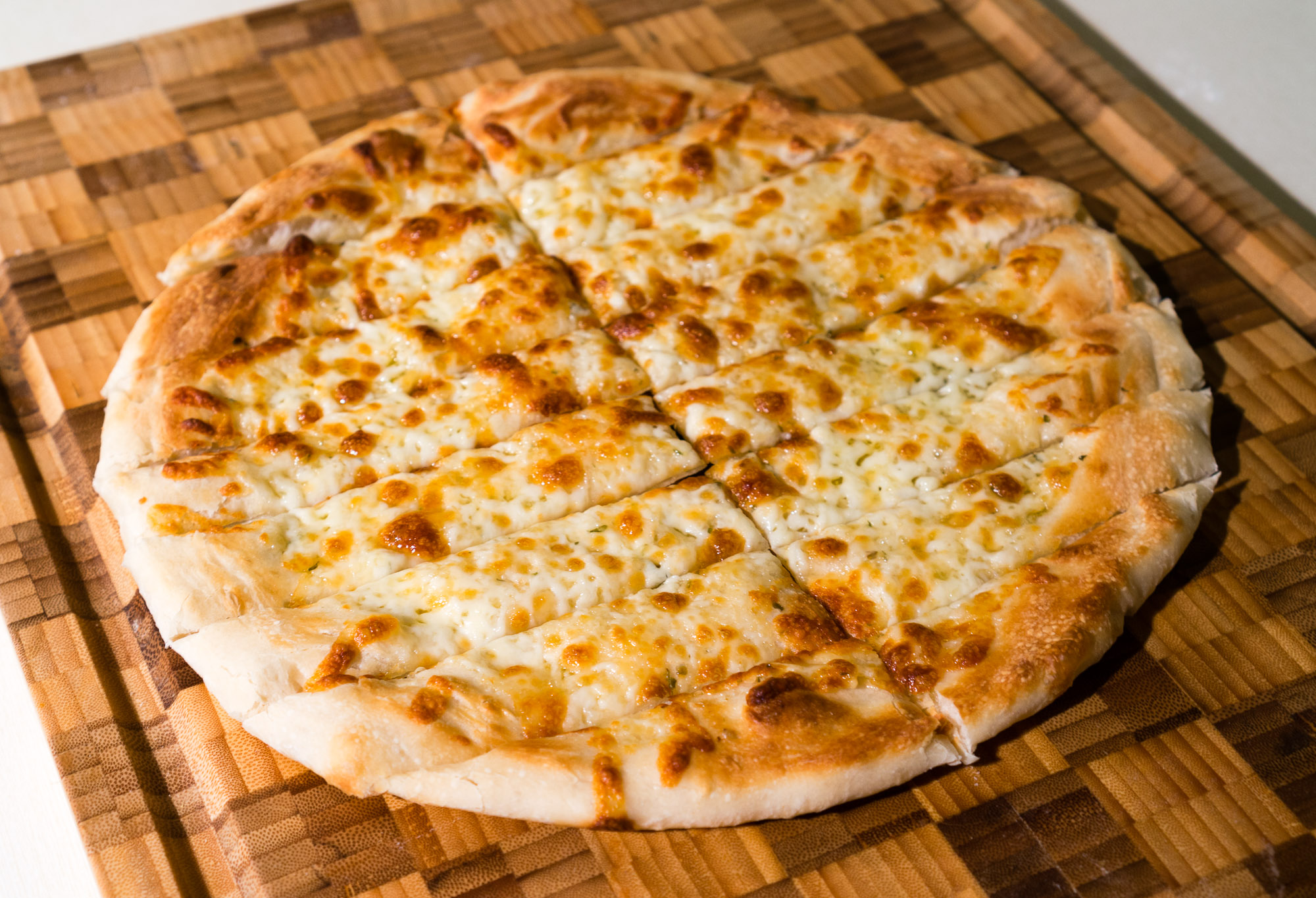
Garlic fingers

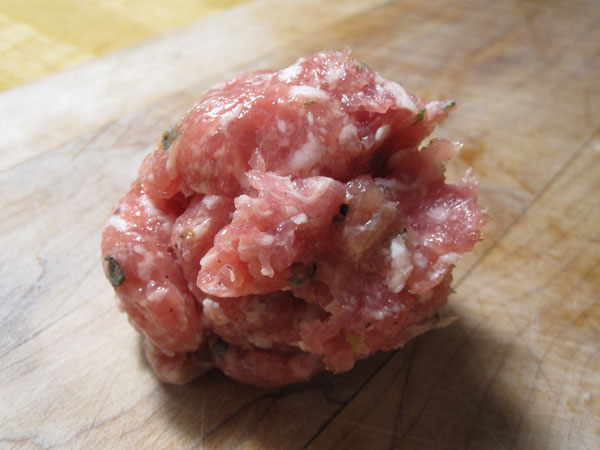
Homemade garlic sausage

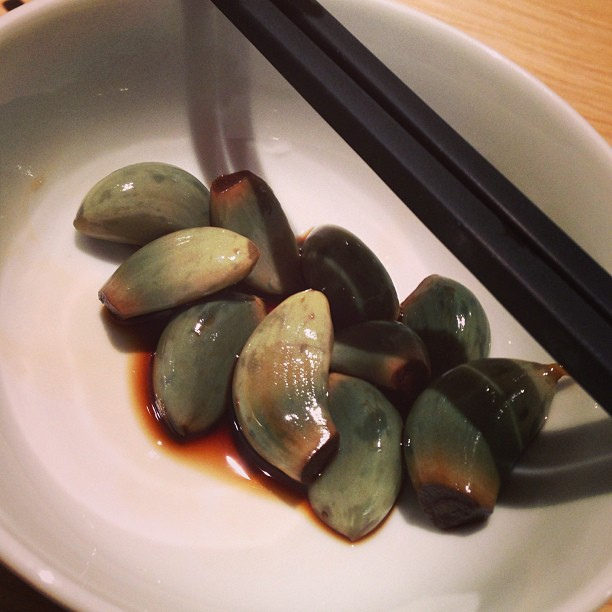
Laba garlic

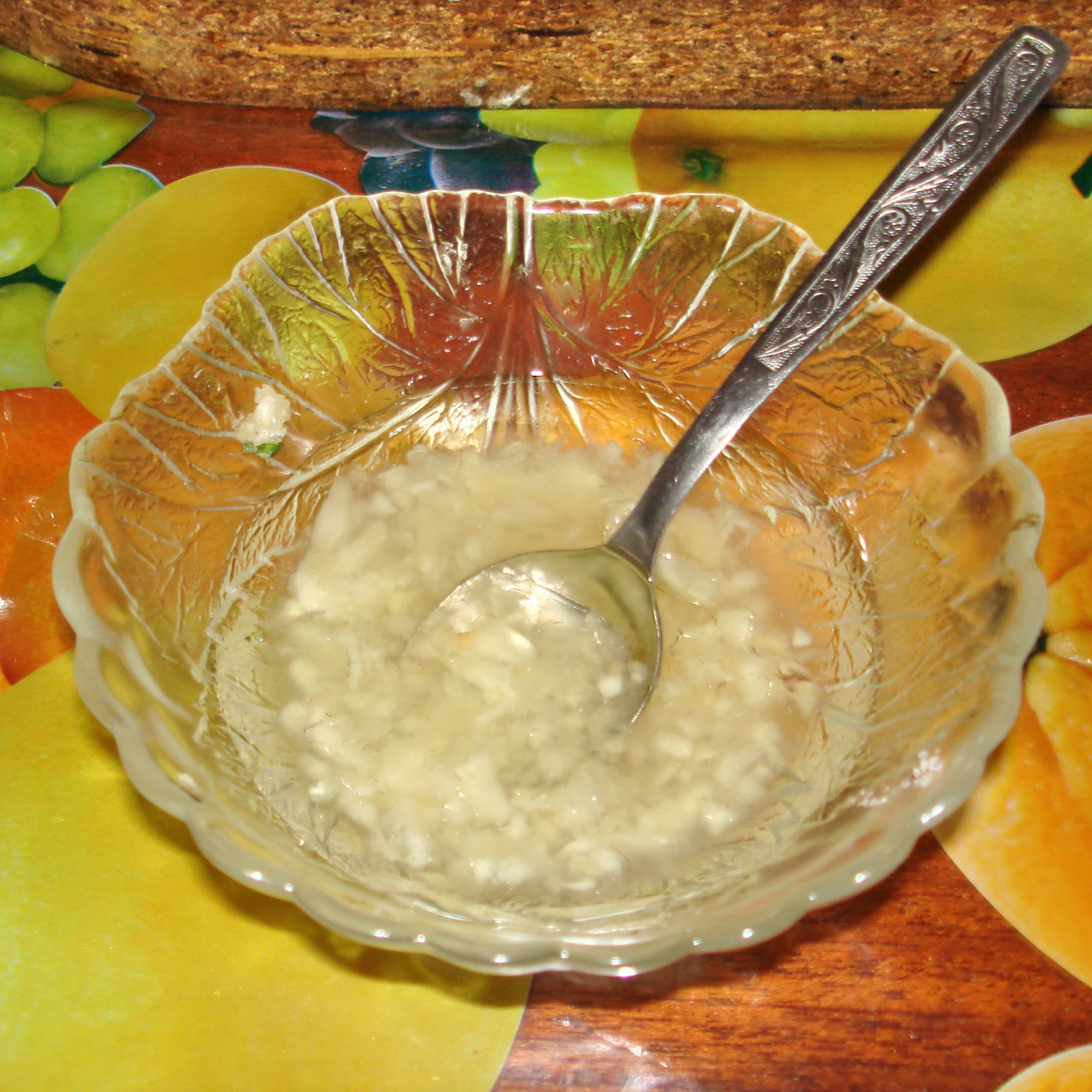
Mujdei

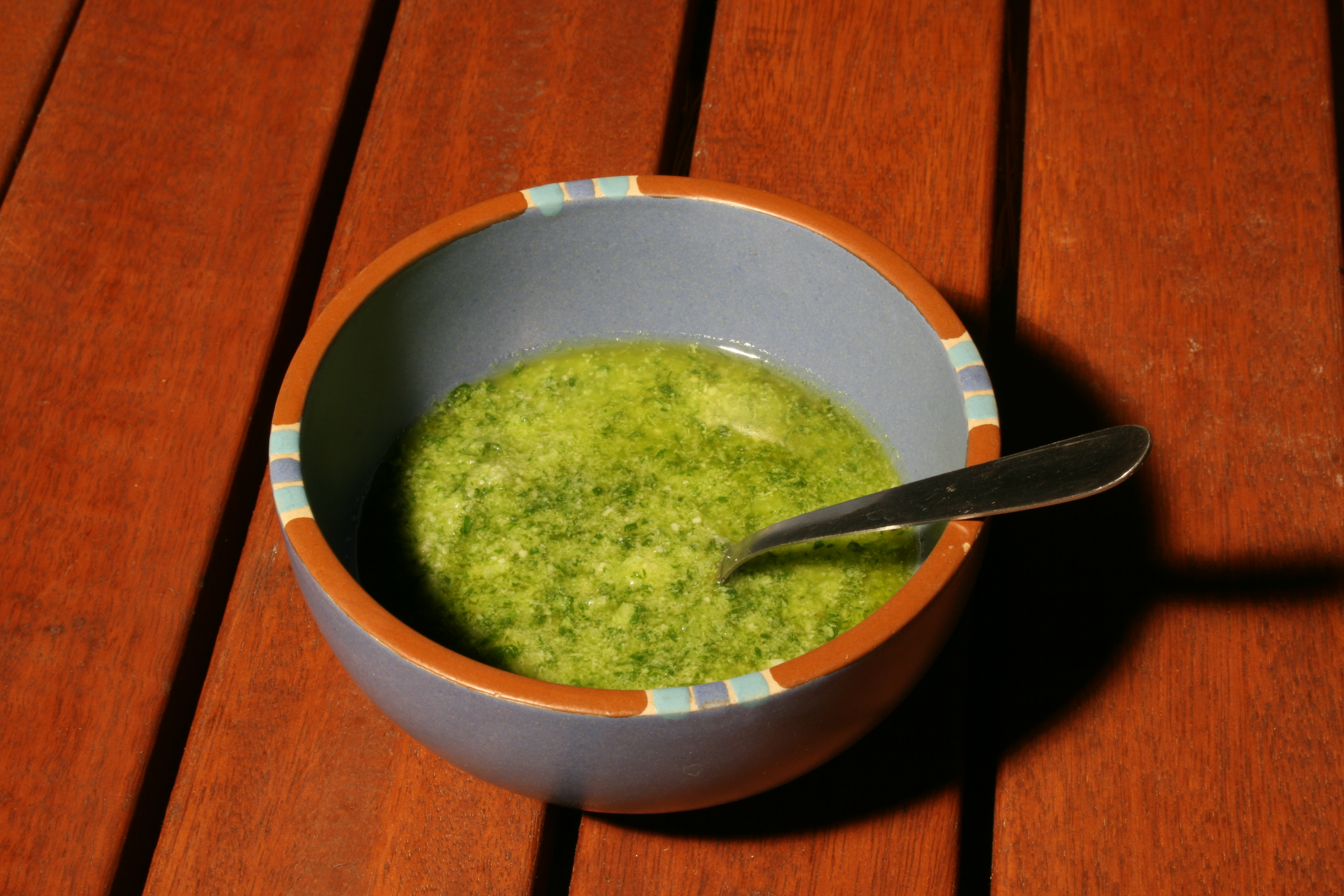
Pistou

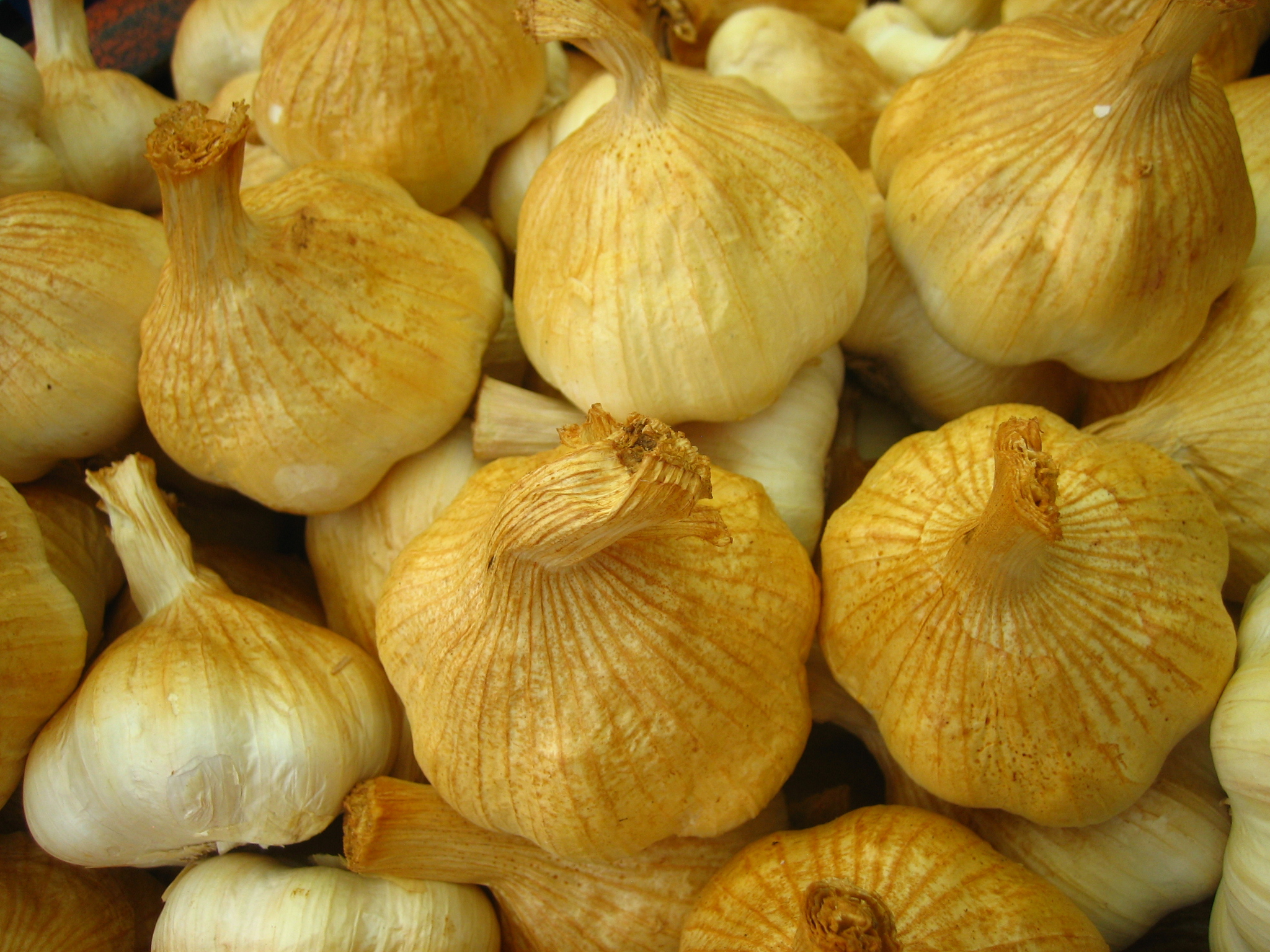
Smoked garlic

== See also ==
- List of onion dishes
- Pyruvate scale
