= Tolo (restaurant) =

Restaurant in New York City, U.S.

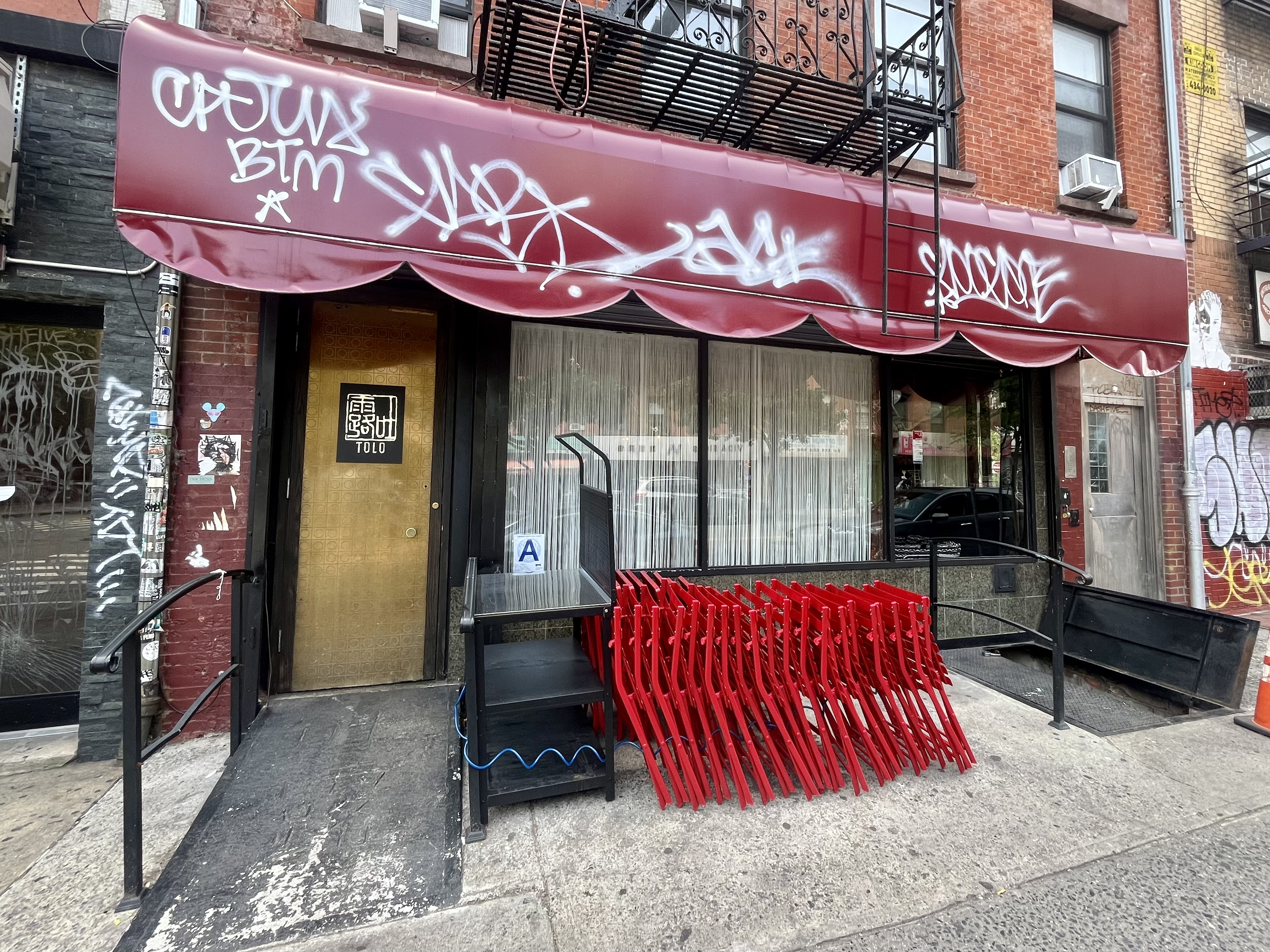
- The restaurant's exterior in 2024
- Interactive map of Tolo

Restaurant information
- Established: November 9, 2023
- Location: 28 Canal Street, New York City, New York, 10002, United States
- Coordinates: 40°42′52″N 73°59′26″W
- Website: tolonyc.com

Tolo is a restaurant in New York City.

== Description ==
The menu includes salt-and-pepper tofu with chili aioli, sweet-and-sour crispy fish, and "Typhoon Shelter-style" chicken.
