= Scorcolga =

Romanian condiment made with walnuts and bread

Scorcolga or Scordolea is a thick sauce of Romanian cuisine from the region of Northern Dobruja consisting of a puree of walnuts and bread mashed with milk, salt, pepper, lemon juice and oil. The scorcolga is traditionally served with crayfish.

== See also ==
- Skordalia
