= Mujdei =

Romanian garlic and vegetable oil sauce

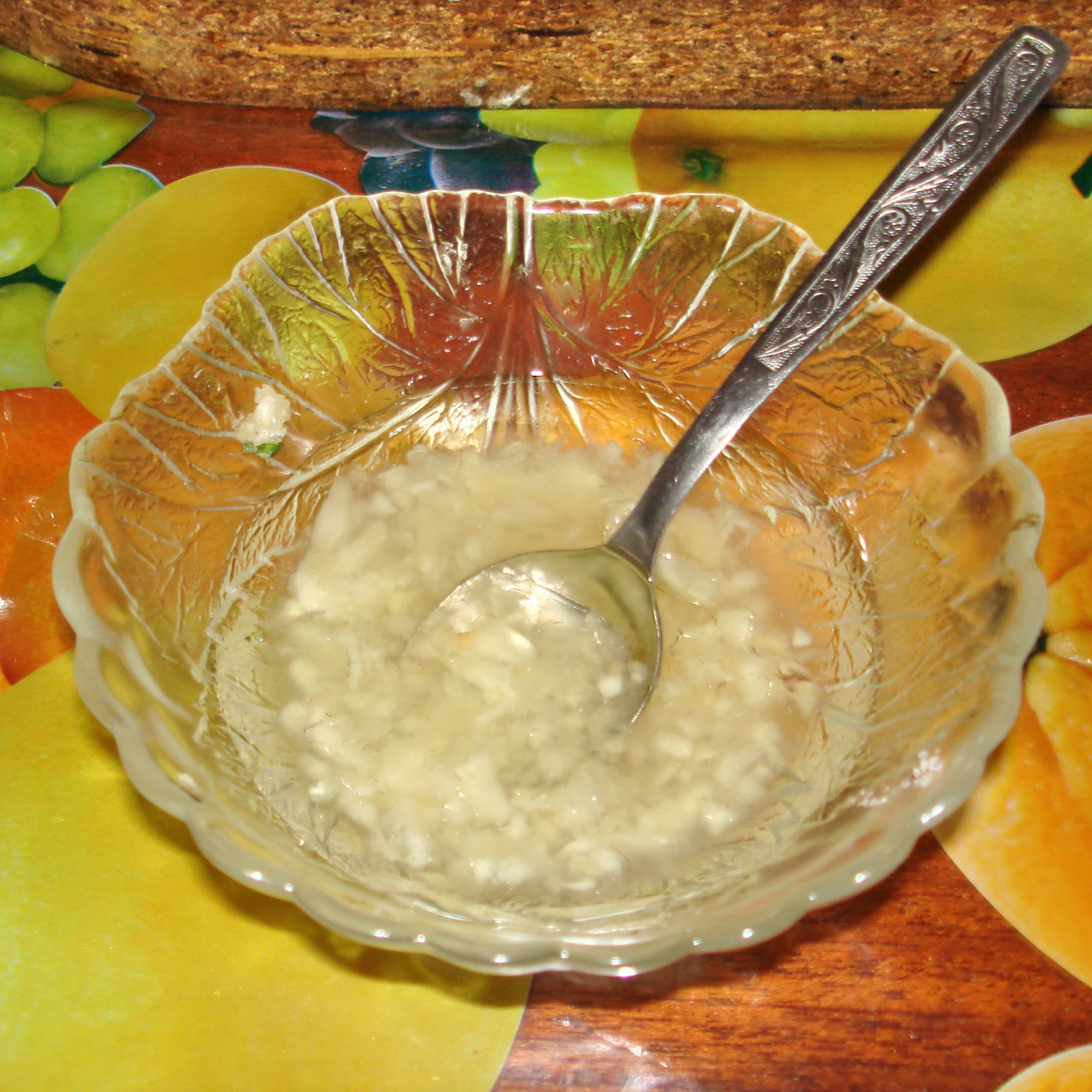
Garlic sauce (mujdei)

Mujdei (Romanian pronunciation: [muʒˈdej], plural: mujdeie) is a traditional spicy Romanian sauce. It is made from garlic cloves crushed and ground into a paste, salted and mixed with vegetable oil (almost always sunflower oil). Depending on regional preferences and the dish it is served with, lemon or other ingredients may be added. The result is a white sauce with a strong garlic flavor, varying in consistency from a thick paste to a runny sauce. In some parts of Romania mujdei is made out of cream, ground garlic, and salt, or sometimes ground garlic, salt, water, oil and paprika powder.

It is served with a variety of dishes, including fried fish, fried or grilled chicken or pork, rasol, and fried potatoes.

The word mujdei is derived from the phrase must de ai, meaning "garlic must (juice)".

== See also ==
- Agliata – an Italian garlic sauce
- Skordalia – a similar Greek garlic dip
- Aioli
- Toum
- Garlic sauce
- List of dips
- List of garlic dishes
- List of sauces
