= Rasol (Romanian dish) =

Romanian stew

- Type: Stew
- Place of origin: Romania
- Main ingredients: Meat (poultry, beef, or pork), potatoes, vegetables (carrots, tomatoes, onions)

Rasol (Romanian pronunciation: [raˈsol]) is a Romanian dish made from meat, potatoes, and vegetables, which are boiled together. The meat can be poultry (usually chicken, but also duck, goose or turkey), beef, or pork. A chopped up chicken or pork chop are usually used. Potatoes (peeled), carrots, tomatoes and onions are added whole and boiled with the meat. It is usually served together with some of the resulting soup, and with mujdei or horseradish.

== See also ==
- List of stews
