= Vanillerostbraten =

Austrian beef cutlet dish

Vanillerostbraten ("vanilla roast beef" in German) is an Austrian beef cutlet dish prepared with garlic, salt, pepper, butter, onions, and brown bouillon and normally served with fried potatoes.

Vanilla is not included in the recipe. When the dish was created, garlic was referred to as the vanilla of the poor man (Vanille des kleinen Mannes). Hence the name.

== See also ==
- List of beef dishes
- List of garlic dishes
