= Garlic noodles =

American food

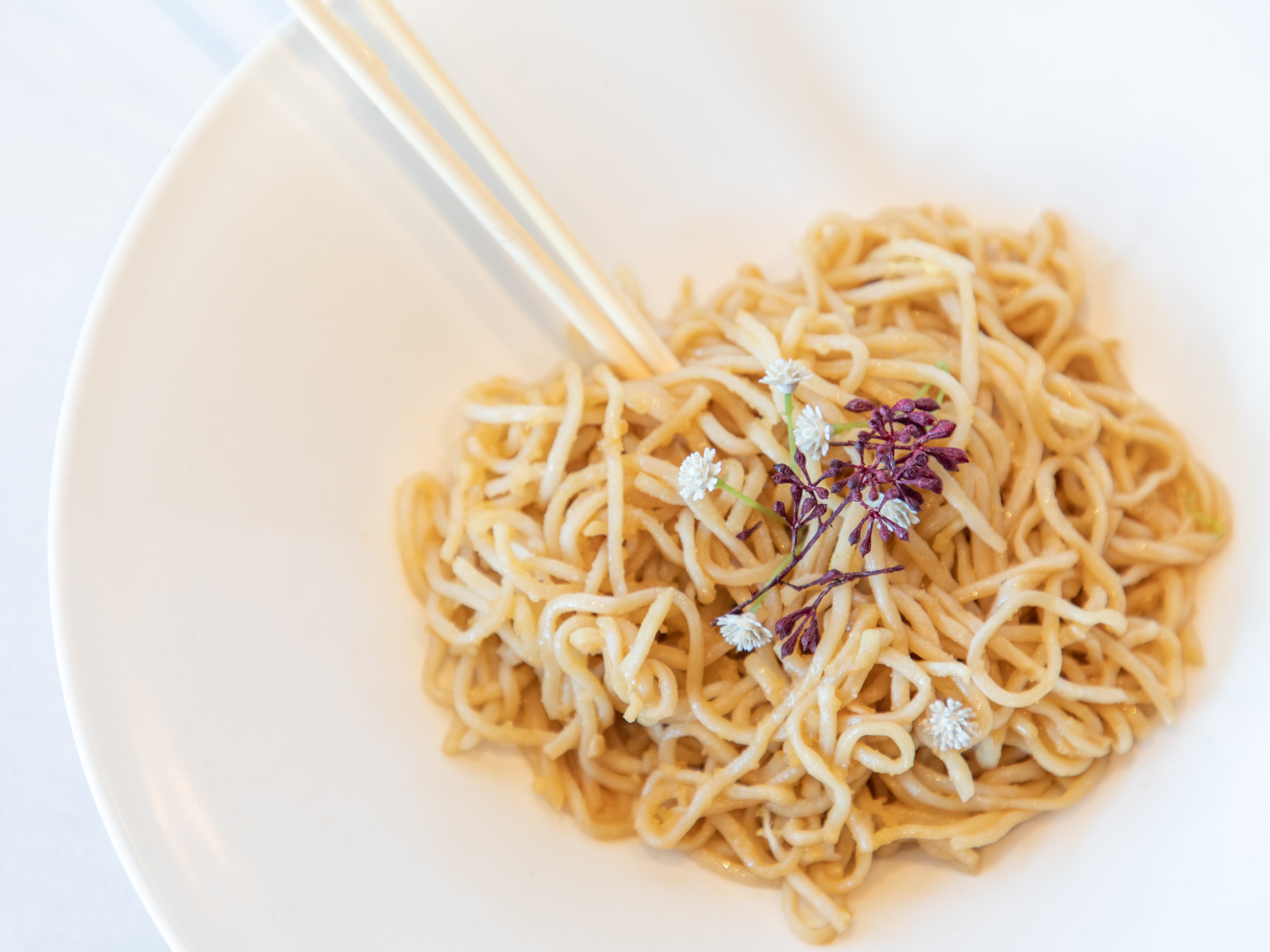
- Garlic noodles
- Alternative names: San Francisco garlic noodles
- Type: Noodle
- Region or state: San Francisco
- Created by: Helene An
- Main ingredients: Garlic, butter, oyster sauce, Parmesan cheese

Garlic noodles (Vietnamese: mì tỏi, pronounced [mi˧˩ tɔj˧˩]) are a noodle dish that originated in San Francisco, California. Created by Helene An in 1975, the dish is known for its rich garlic flavor, and has become a popular item in Vietnamese, Asian fusion, and mainstream eateries across the United States.

== History ==
Garlic noodles were created by Helene An at Thanh Long, a Vietnamese restaurant located in San Francisco. An, who immigrated to the United States from Vietnam in 1975, sought to create a dish that would appeal to American tastes while incorporating traditional Vietnamese flavors. The result was garlic noodles, which blend Vietnamese and Italian culinary techniques. The dish became a signature offering at Thanh Long and is typically paired with seafood, such as whole roasted Dungeness crab and butterflied prawns.

== Popularity ==
Since its creation, garlic noodles have been adapted by various restaurants and chefs across the United States. Different variations of the dish, such as spicy garlic noodles and soy butter garlic noodles, have emerged in numerous Asian-fusion restaurants. The dish's influence expanded when it was featured by J. Kenji López-Alt in The New York Times, further popularizing the recipe among a broader audience.

Garlic noodles became especially well known at Thanh Long, where they contributed to the restaurant's growing reputation for seafood in the 1980s. High-profile patrons, including celebrities, were regular visitors, which increased the dish's visibility. By the late 1980s, the success of Thanh Long helped propel the An family's expansion into other restaurants, such as Crustacean in San Francisco and Beverly Hills.

== See also ==
- List of noodle dishes
- List of garlic dishes
- List of Vietnamese dishes
- Vietnamese cuisine
