= Ginger garlic masala =

Mixture of raw ginger and garlic cloves

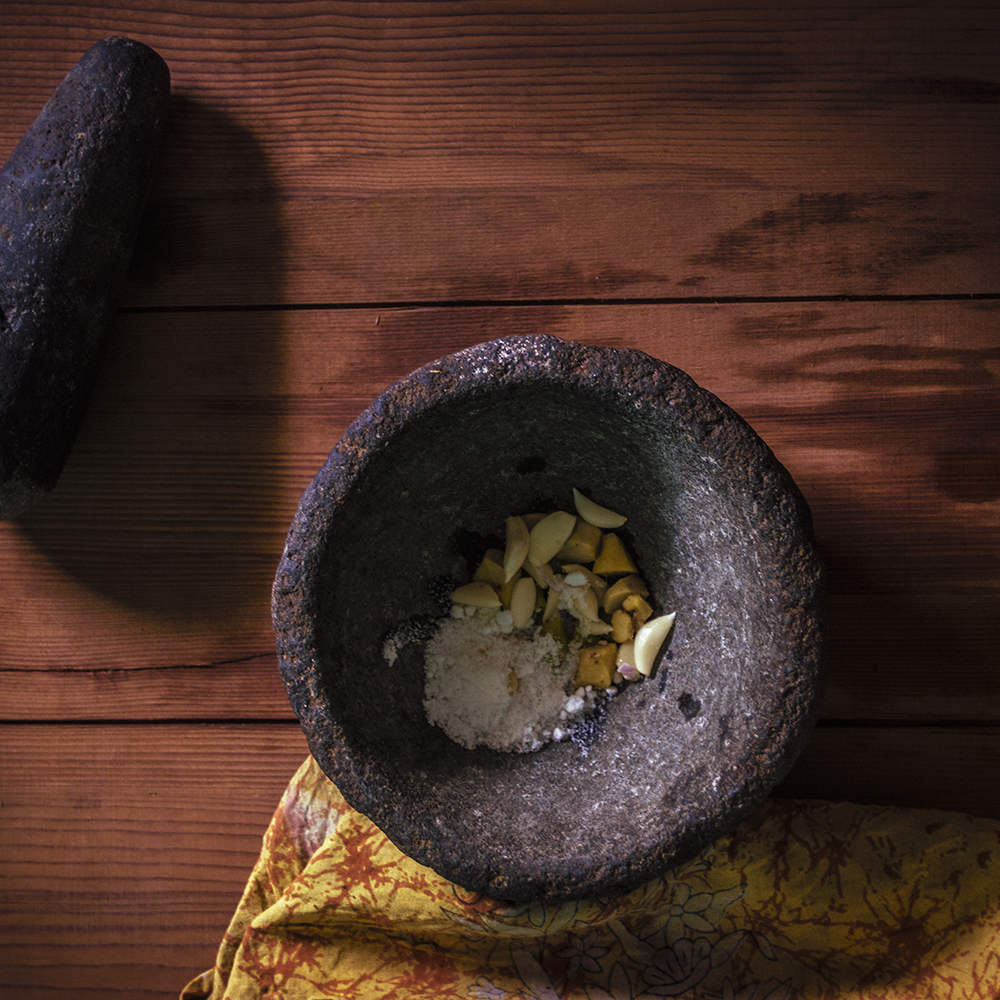
Grindstone (also called mortar and pestle) with garlic and ginger

Ginger garlic masala is a crushed mixture of raw ginger and garlic cloves.

Optionally, salt is added to the ginger garlic paste while crushing.

This compounded mixture is often used in Indian curries and vegetable dishes in many parts of India. It is also used in Thai cuisine.

The mixture has some beneficial properties and also enhances the taste and flavour of the dish it is added to. Ginger is especially well known for its digestive properties.

Ideally, the paste or masala should be freshly prepared using a grindstone. However, due to scarcity of time and unavailability of a grindstone, people may use a mixer-grinder appliance to prepare the paste. These days, the paste is also available as a ready-made preserve in many departmental stores or groceries.

== See also ==
- List of garlic dishes
