= Kibbeling =

Dutch seafood snack, consisting of chunks of deep-fried cod

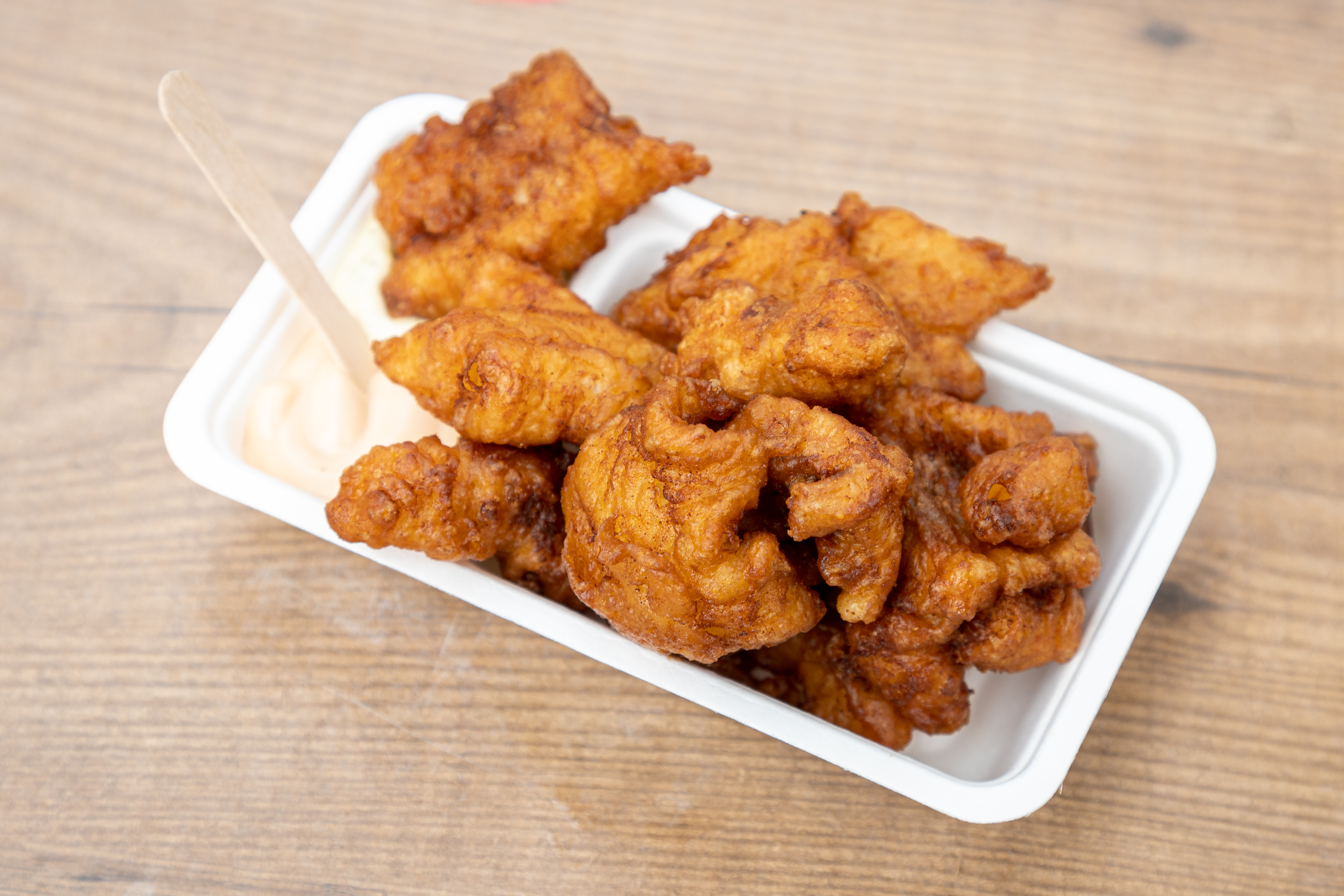
- A portion of kibbeling with garlic sauce.
- Course: Lunch, snack
- Place of origin: Netherlands
- Region or state: Northwestern Europe
- Main ingredients: Battered chunks of fish

Kibbeling (Dutch: [ˈkɪbəlɪŋ]) is a Dutch snack consisting of battered chunks of fish (traditionally cod), seasoned with a mix of spices and commonly served with remoulade or ravigote. Since the first half of the 17th century, it denoted the salted waste (the cheeks) of the cod fish, which was an important part of the common diet. It is a frequently consumed dish in the Netherlands.

== See also ==
- Fish and chips
- List of deep-fried foods
- List of fish dishes
