= L'Aiòli =

Provençal newspaper in Avignon, France

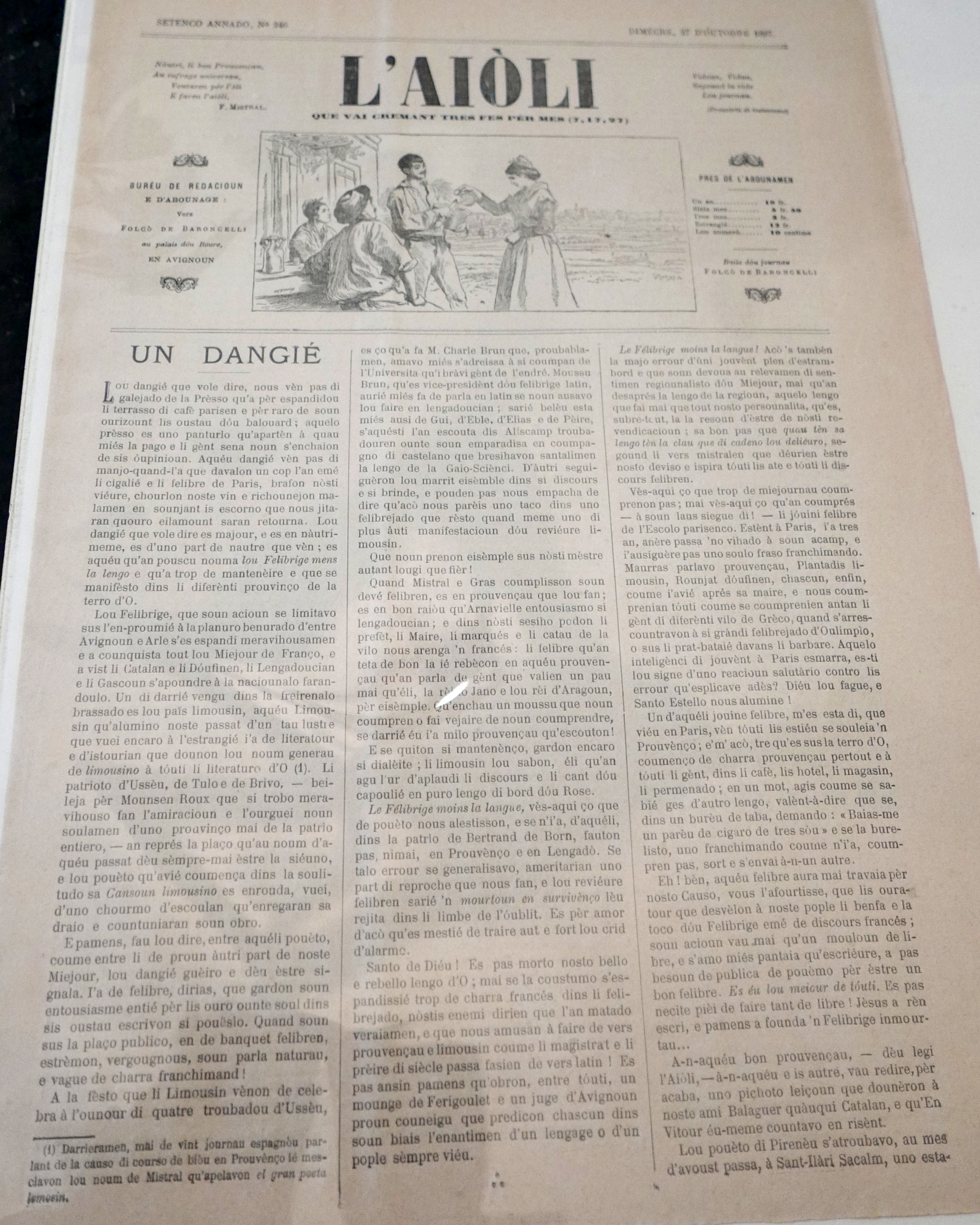

L'Aiòli was a Provençal-language newspaper founded by Frédéric Mistral in 1891 to defend and promote Occitan languages and literature, as part of the Félibrige movement. The name comes from a famous Provençal dish, aïoli.

It was published in Avignon and published three issues monthly.

It closed in 1899 after a total of 324 issues had been published.
