= Toum =

Garlic sauce common in the Levant

Salsat toum
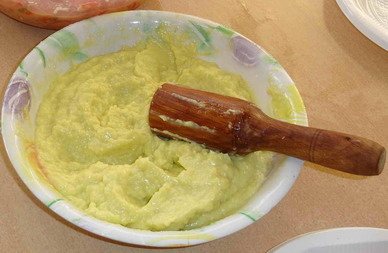
- A bowl of salsat toum with a pestle
- Region or state: Middle East
- Main ingredients: Garlic

Salsat toum (Arabic for 'garlic sauce'), also known as toumiya (Arabic: ثومية) or simply toum (ثوم 'garlic'), is a garlic sauce common to the Levant. It is similar to the Provençal aioli. There are many variations; a common one contains garlic, salt, olive oil or vegetable oil, and lemon juice, traditionally crushed together using a wooden mortar and pestle. There is also a popular variation in Lebanon where mint is added; it is called zeit wa toum ('oil and garlic').

Salsat toum is used as a dip, especially with french fries, chicken, and artichoke, and in Levantine sandwiches, especially those containing chicken. It is also commonly served with grilled chicken dishes, and can be served with almost any meat dish.

== Etymology ==
Toum means "garlic" in Arabic (ثوم ṯūm). The sauce goes by many names in Arabic, including, in addition to the above: مثومة (muṯawama) and ثومية (ṯūmiyya).

19th-century Orientalist Reinhart Dozy described muthawwamah (مثومة) as a "white sauce made from garlic and cheese" in his 1881 dictionary titled Supplément aux dictionnaires arabes.

== Preparation ==
Toum is traditionally prepared with a mortar and pestle, but food processors are often used instead. In its most basic form, toum is made from three ingredients: fresh garlic, table salt, and a neutral oil.

To make toum, the garlic is ground until it turns into paste and oil is slowly streamed into the mix. The mixture is pulsed until it emulsifies, with lemon juice or other ingredients often added to help with the emulsion.

Toum is traditionally vegan as it contains no eggs, but contemporary non-vegan varieties exist.

== See also ==
- Garlic sauces:
  - Aioli – West Mediterranean sauce of garlic and oil
  - Agliata – Italian garlic sauce and condiment
  - Mujdei – Romanian garlic and vegetable oil sauce
  - Skordalia – Thick garlic sauce in Greek cuisine
- List of Middle Eastern dishes
- List of dips
- List of garlic dishes
- List of sauces
