= Garlic sauce =

Sauce with garlic as a main ingredient

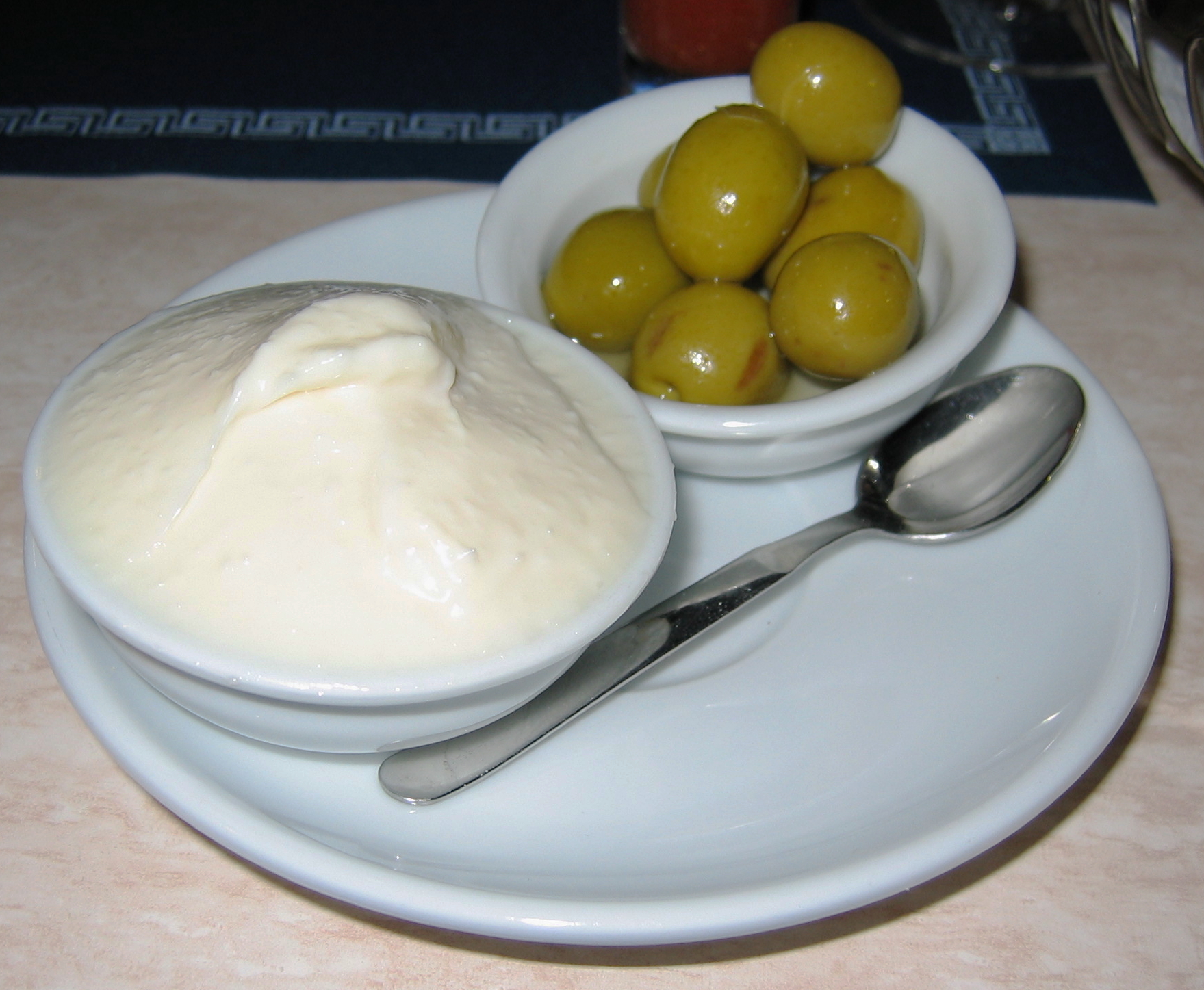
Aioli with olives

Garlic sauce is any sauce prepared using garlic as a primary ingredient. It is typically pungent, with the depth of garlic flavor determined by the amount of garlic used. The garlic is typically crushed or finely diced. Simple garlic sauces are composed of garlic and another ingredient to suspend it via emulsion, such as oil, butter or mayonnaise. Various additional ingredients can be used to prepare the sauce.

Garlic sauces can be used to add flavor to many foods and dishes, such as steak, fish, seafood, mutton, chops, chicken, eggs and vegetables. It is also used as a condiment.

== Types ==
=== Agliata ===
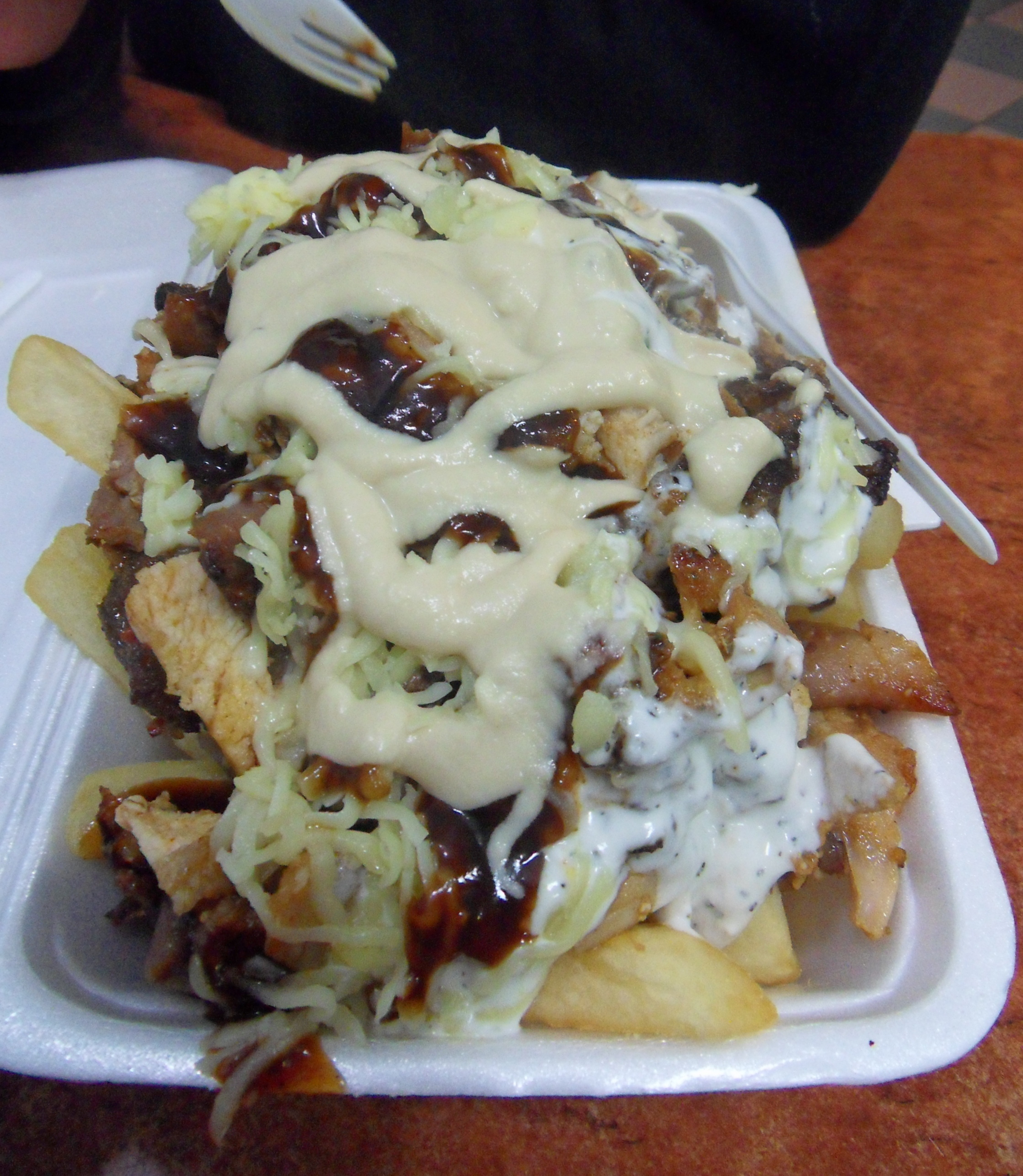
Garlic sauce used on a doner kebab

Agliata is a savory and pungent garlic sauce and condiment in Italian cuisine used to flavor and accompany broiled or boiled meats, fish and vegetables. It is first attested in Ancient Rome, and it remains part of the cuisine of Liguria. Porrata is a similar sauce prepared with leeks in place of garlic.

=== Aioli ===
Aioli is a Mediterranean sauce made of garlic and olive oil; in some regions other emulsifiers such as egg are used. The names mean "garlic and oil" in Catalan and Provençal. It is particularly associated with the cuisines of the Mediterranean coasts of Spain (Valencia, Catalonia, the Balearic Islands, Murcia and eastern Andalusia), France (Provence) and Italy (Liguria).

=== Filfil chuma ===
Filfil chuma is a North African recipe from Libyan Jews that is made from sweet and hot pepper powder, heaps of ground garlic, caraway, and cumin. It is used as a dipping sauce much like in Ethiopian cuisine, as a marinade for meat, or as a base seasoning for things such as stew and sauces.

=== Honey garlic sauce ===
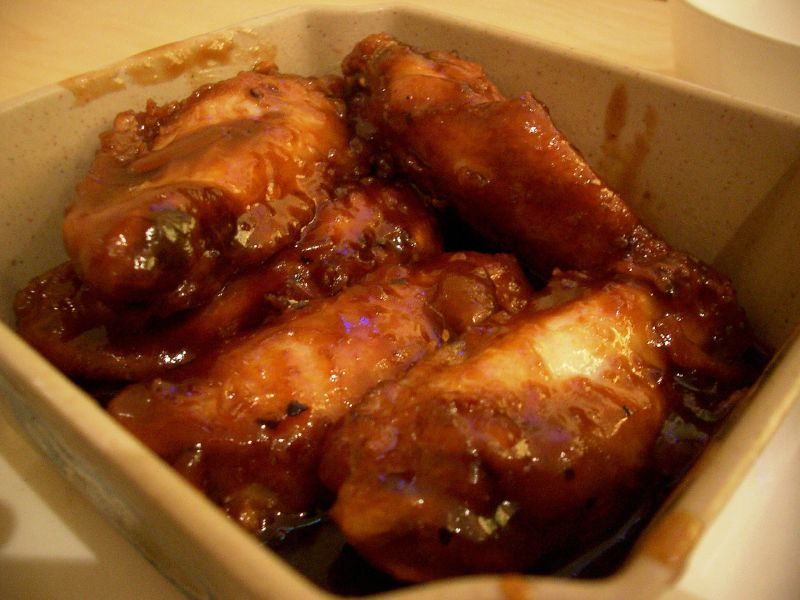
Chicken wings with honey garlic sauce

Honey garlic sauce is a sweet and sour sauce that tastes like a mix between honey and garlic, popular in Canada. Honey garlic is one of the many sauces put on chicken wings, ribs and other foods, such as meatballs.

=== Mojo ===
In Cuban cuisine, mojo applies to any sauce that is made with garlic, olive oil or pork lard, and a citrus juice, traditionally bitter orange juice. It is commonly used to flavor the cassava tuber and is also used to marinate roast pork. Without oregano, the sauce is typically called 'mojito' and used for dipping plantain chips and fried cassava (yuca). To create the marinade for pork, the ingredients are bitter orange juice, garlic, oregano, cumin, and salt. Garlic is also used as an ingredient in other preparations of mojo in various cuisines.

=== Mujdei ===
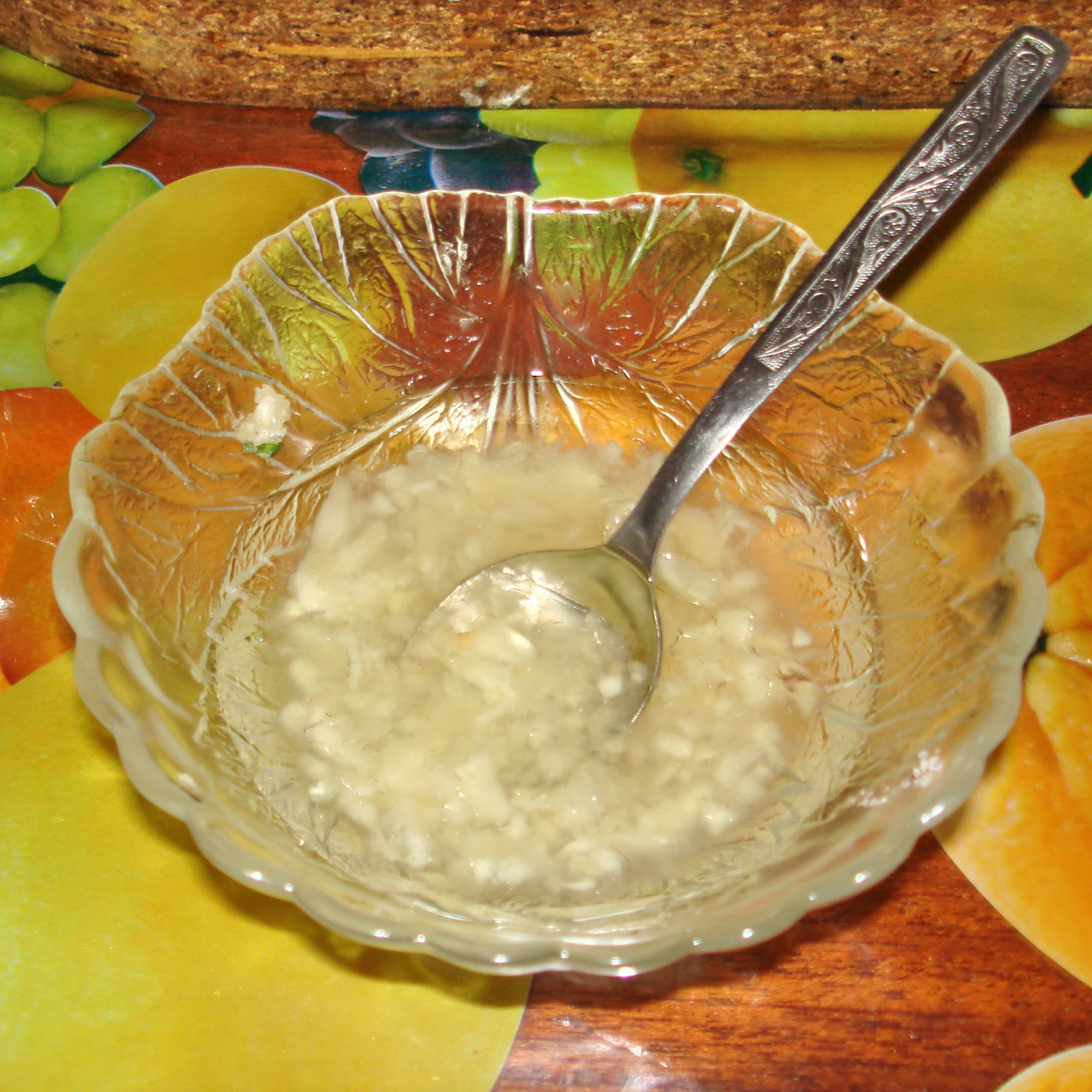
Mujdei

Mujdei is a spicy sauce in Romanian cuisine made from garlic cloves crushed and ground into a paste, salted and mixed with water and vegetable oil. Sunflower oil is almost always used. Sour cream can be added too.

=== Skordalia ===
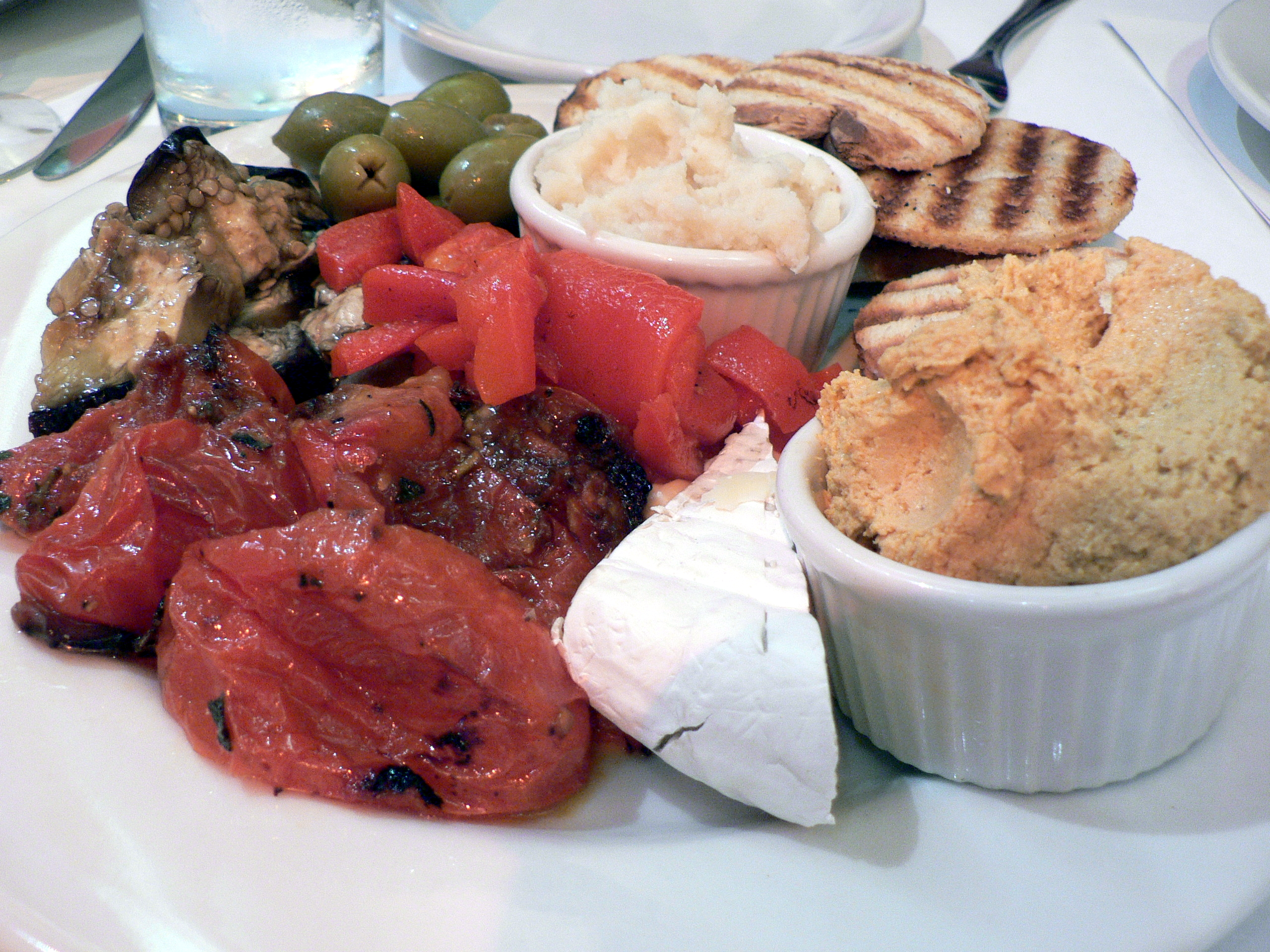
Skordalia (in ramekin at center) with hummus, vegetables and pita

Skordalia is a thick puree (or sauce, dip, spread, etc.) in Greek cuisine made by combining crushed garlic with a bulky base—which may be a purée of potatoes, walnuts, almonds, or liquid-soaked stale bread—and then beating in olive oil to make a smooth emulsion. Vinegar is often added.

=== Ta'leya ===
Ta'leya (Egyptian Arabic: تقلية, lit. 'frying') is a garlic sauce in Egyptian cuisine made by frying garlic with ghee or oil and then adding coriander and chili. It is used as an ingredient to add flavor to bamia and koshary.

=== Taratoor ===
Tarator, made of tahini, lemon juice and garlic, is a creamy garlic sauce in Arab cuisine of the Persian Gulf and French cuisine that is a predecessor to aioli. It was first prepared in the Greater Syrian region by peasants. It was later brought to the Iberian Peninsula by Phoenicians, and was also brought to the Iberian peninsula at a later time by Arabs. From there, the sauce was brought to Southern France.

=== Tomato and garlic sauce ===
Tomato and garlic sauce is prepared using tomatoes as a main ingredient, and is used in various cuisines and dishes. In Italian cuisine, alla pizzaiola refers to a tomato and garlic sauce, which is used on pizza, pasta and meats.

=== Toum ===
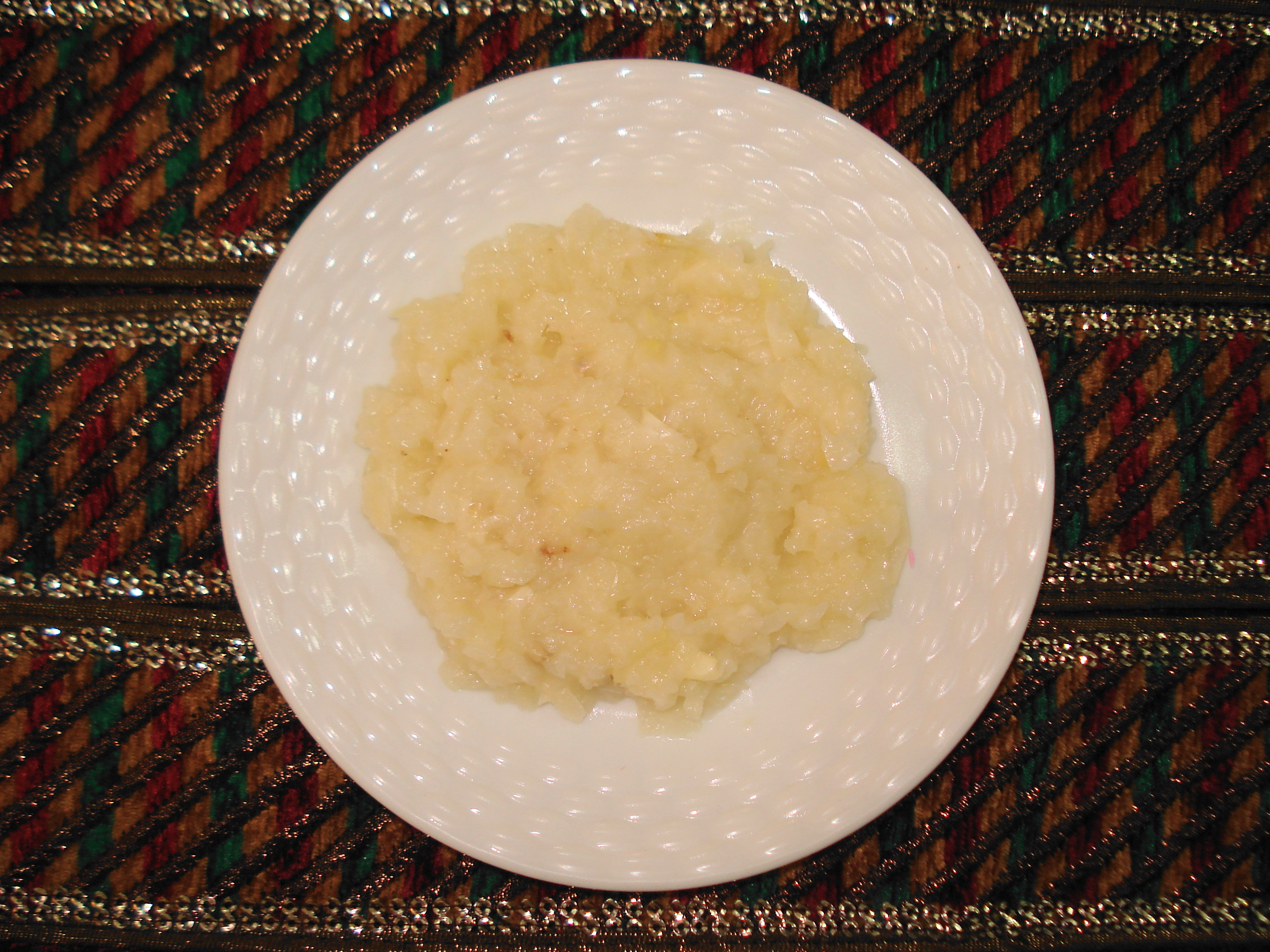
Toum

Toum is a thick garlic sauce common to the Levant. It contains crushed garlic, salt, olive oil or vegetable oil, and lemon juice, traditionally crushed together using a wooden mortar and pestle.

=== Sweet chili garlic sauce ===
Made throughout Southeast Asia, this uses red chilies, garlic, vinegar, and sugar syrup as the main ingredients, usually combined with a thickener like cornstarch.

=== Tzatziki ===
Tzatziki originated in Greece; it is made of minced garlic, grated cucumbers and yoghurt. It is popular especially in the Balkans. In Bulgaria it is called сух таратор, meaning "dried tarator", which is nothing like the Arabic taratoor.

== Gallery ==
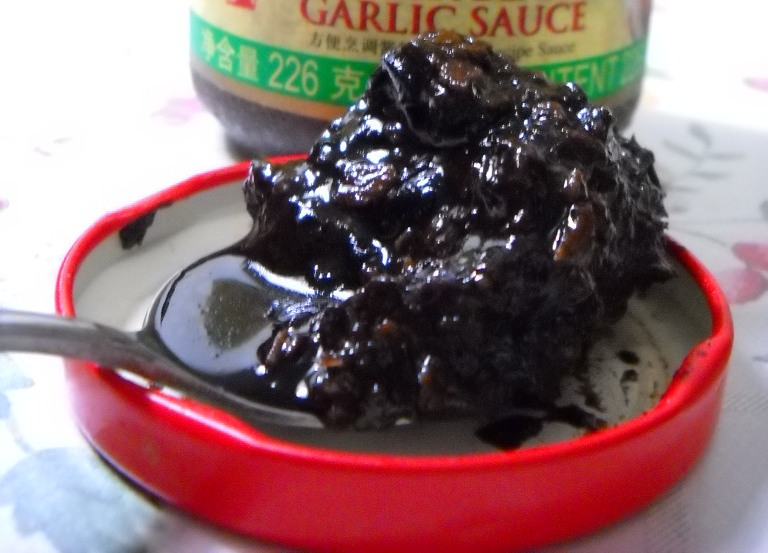
A commercial douchi garlic sauce

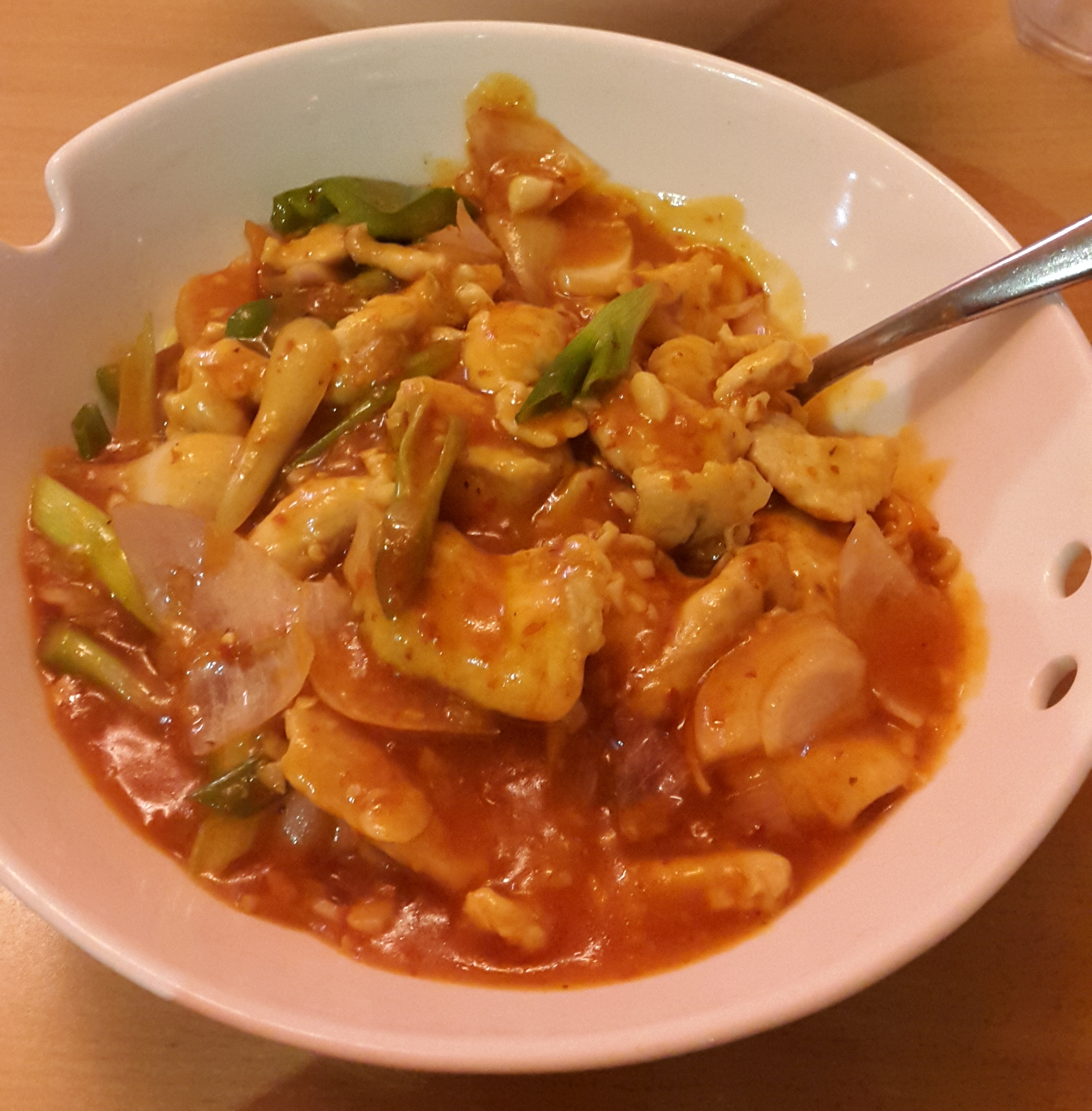
Chicken with a hot garlic sauce

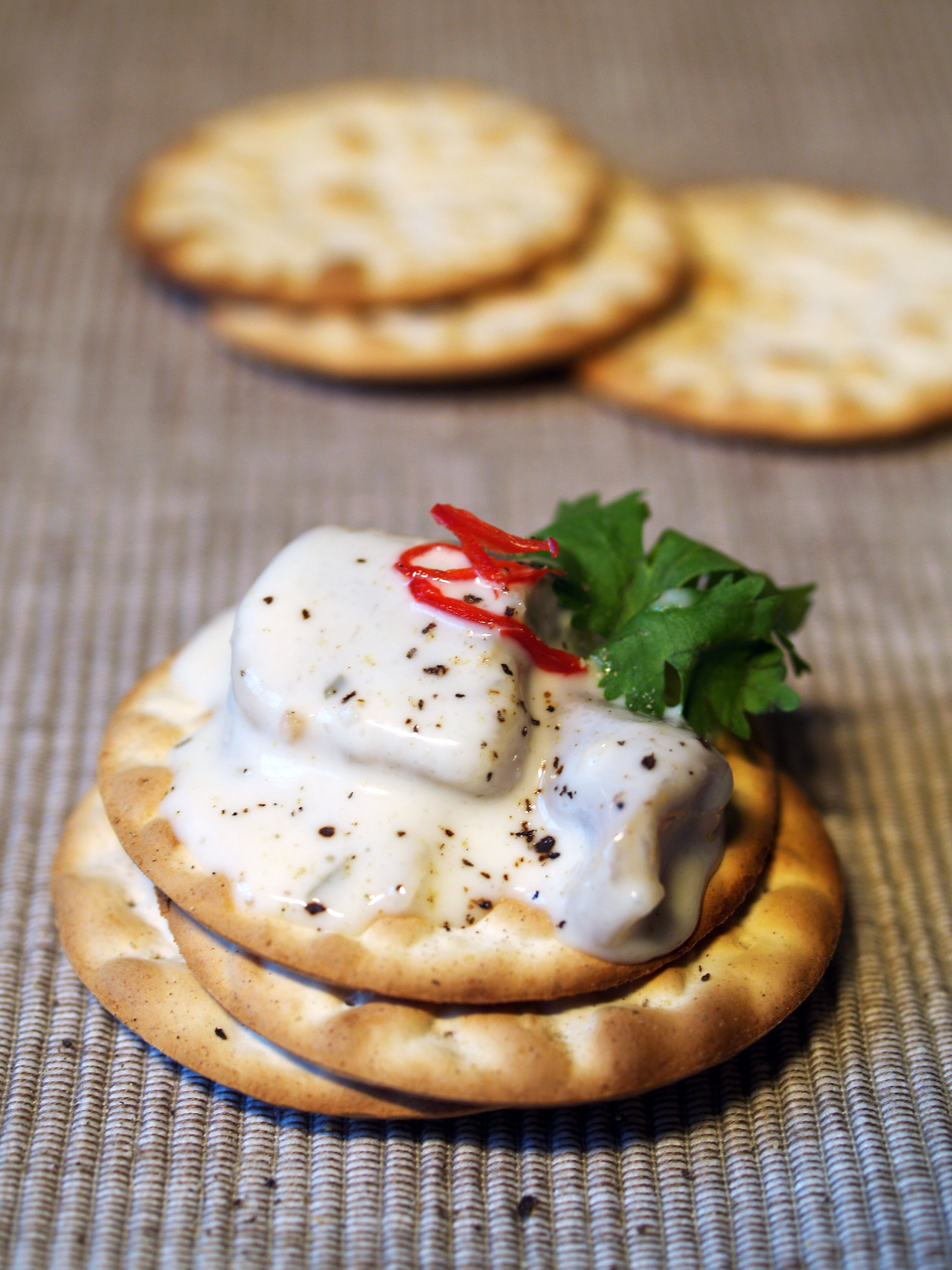
Crackers and herring topped with a garlic sauce

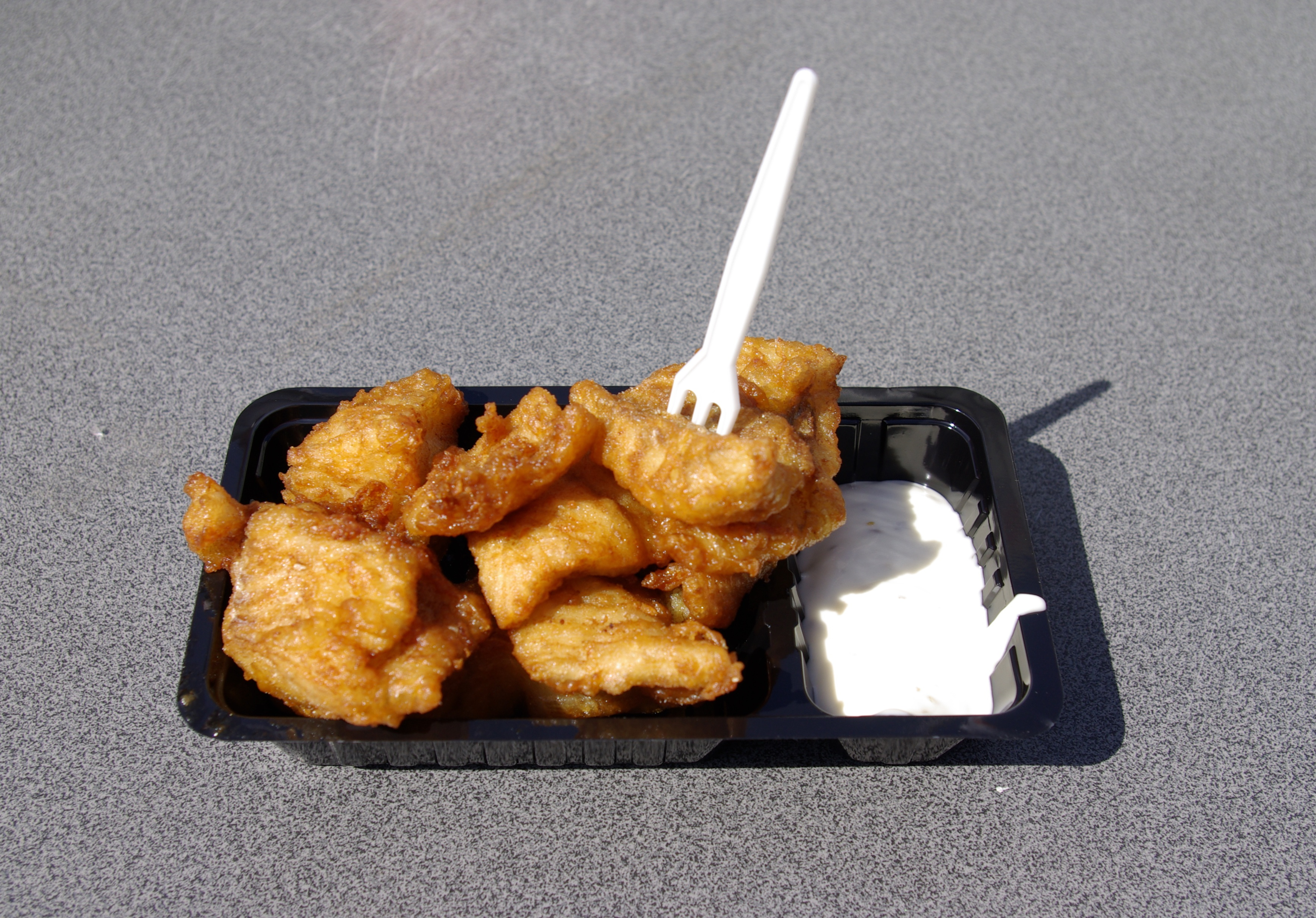
Kibbeling with garlic sauce

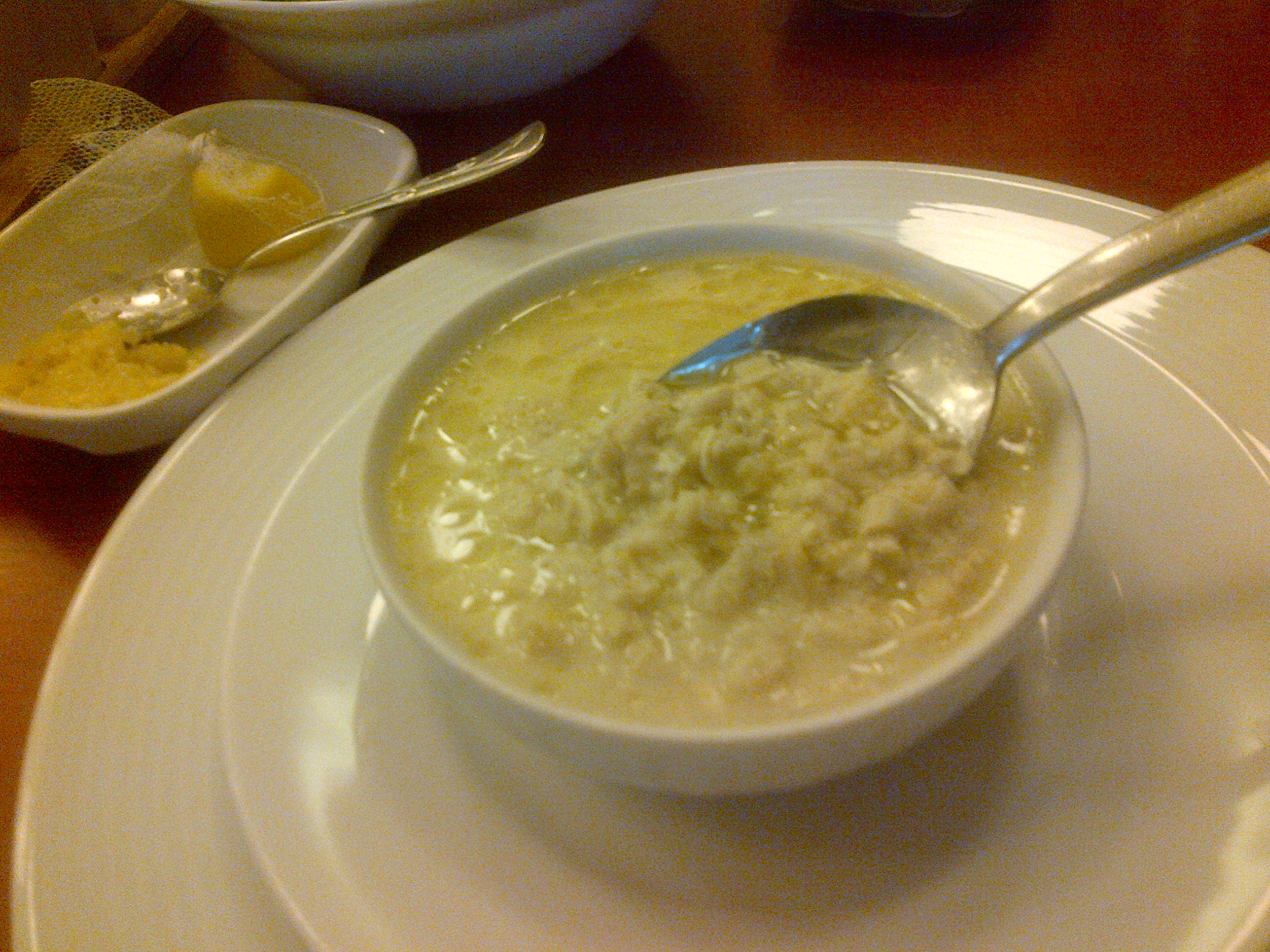
Ishkembe soup with a side dish of garlic sauce and lemon

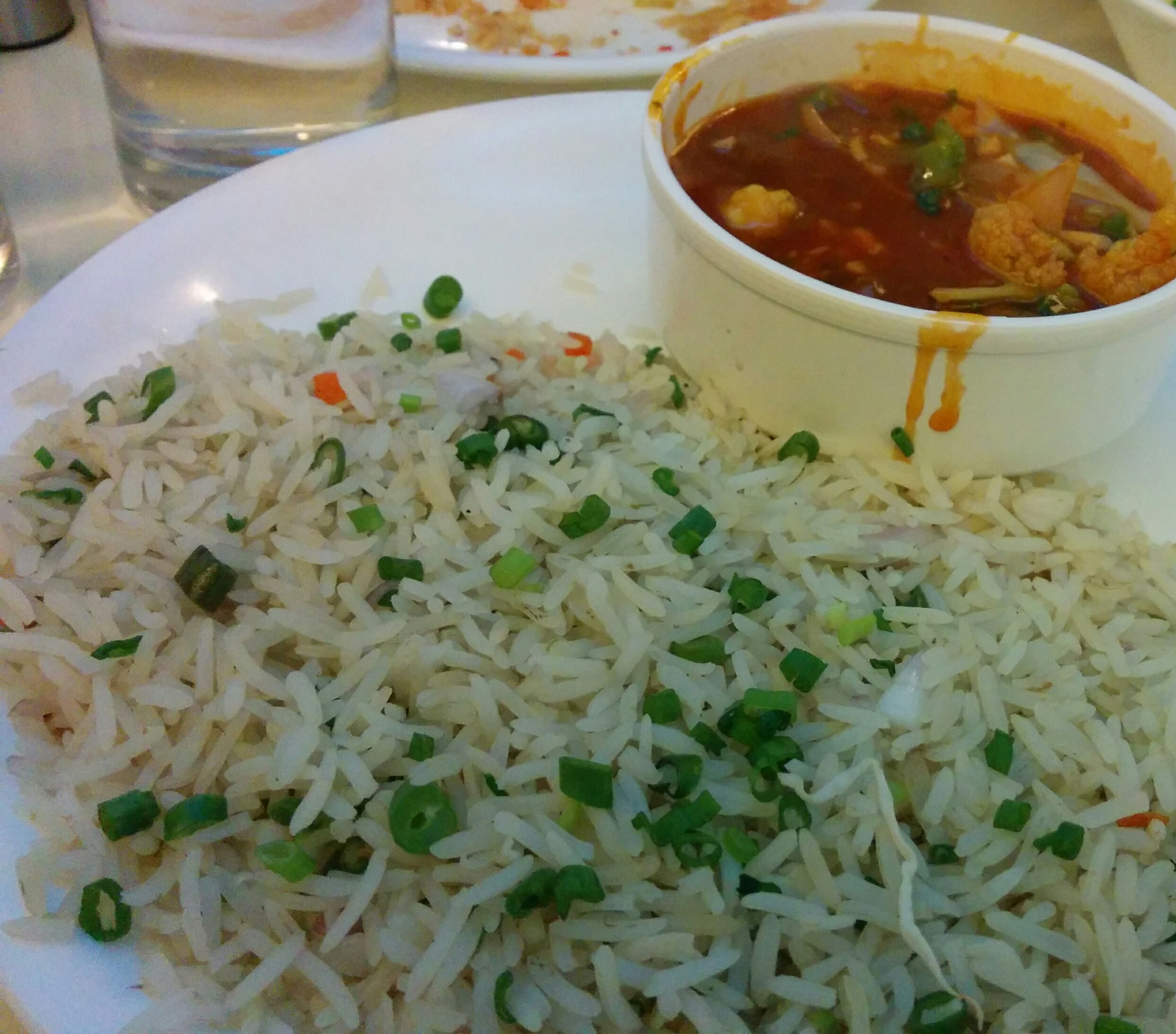
Vegetables in hot garlic sauce (top) with fried rice in India

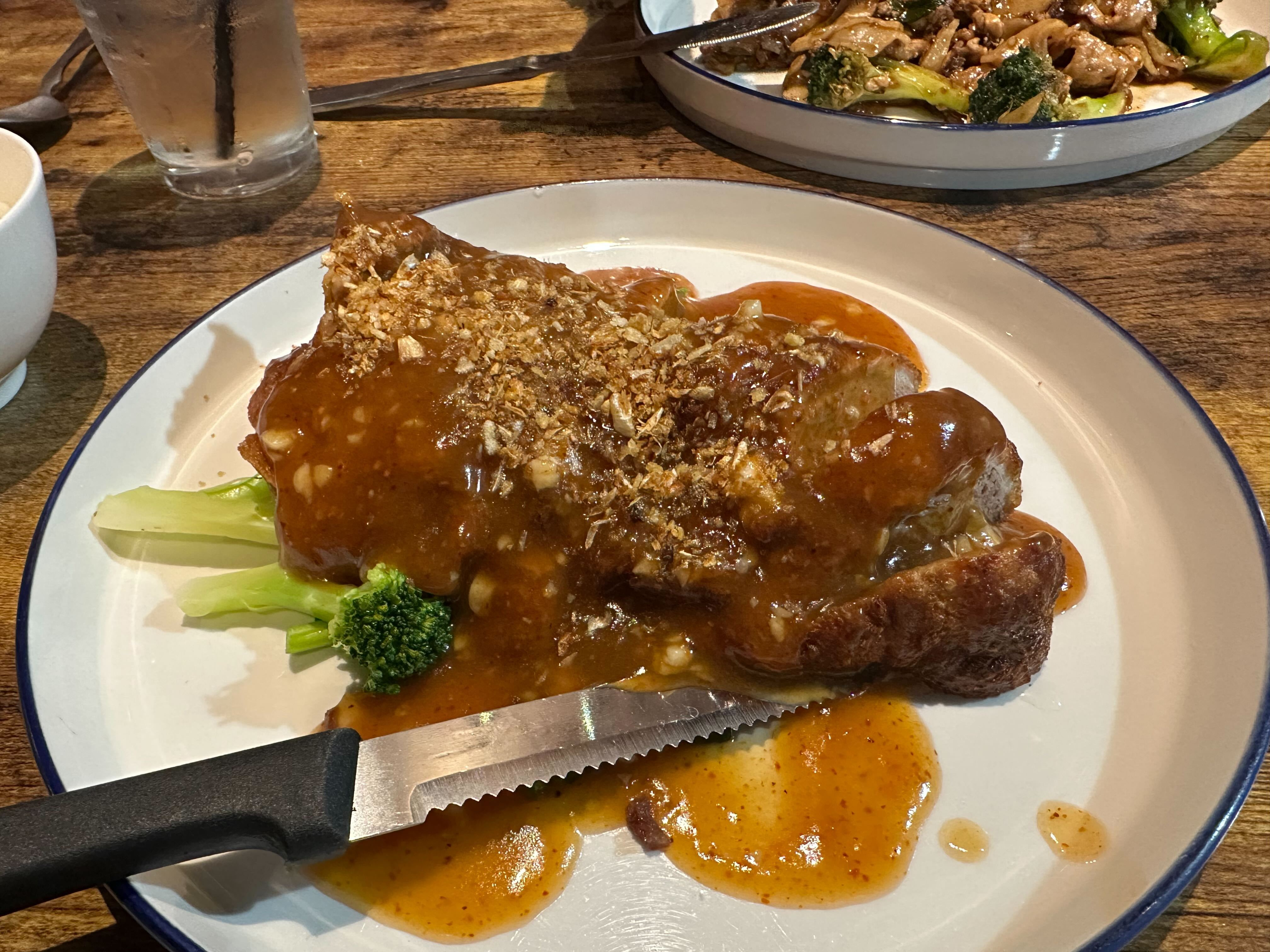
Thai Crispy Duck with Hot Garlic Sauce

== See also ==
- Garlic oil
- List of condiments
- List of sauces
