= Skordalia =

Thick garlic sauce in Greek cuisine

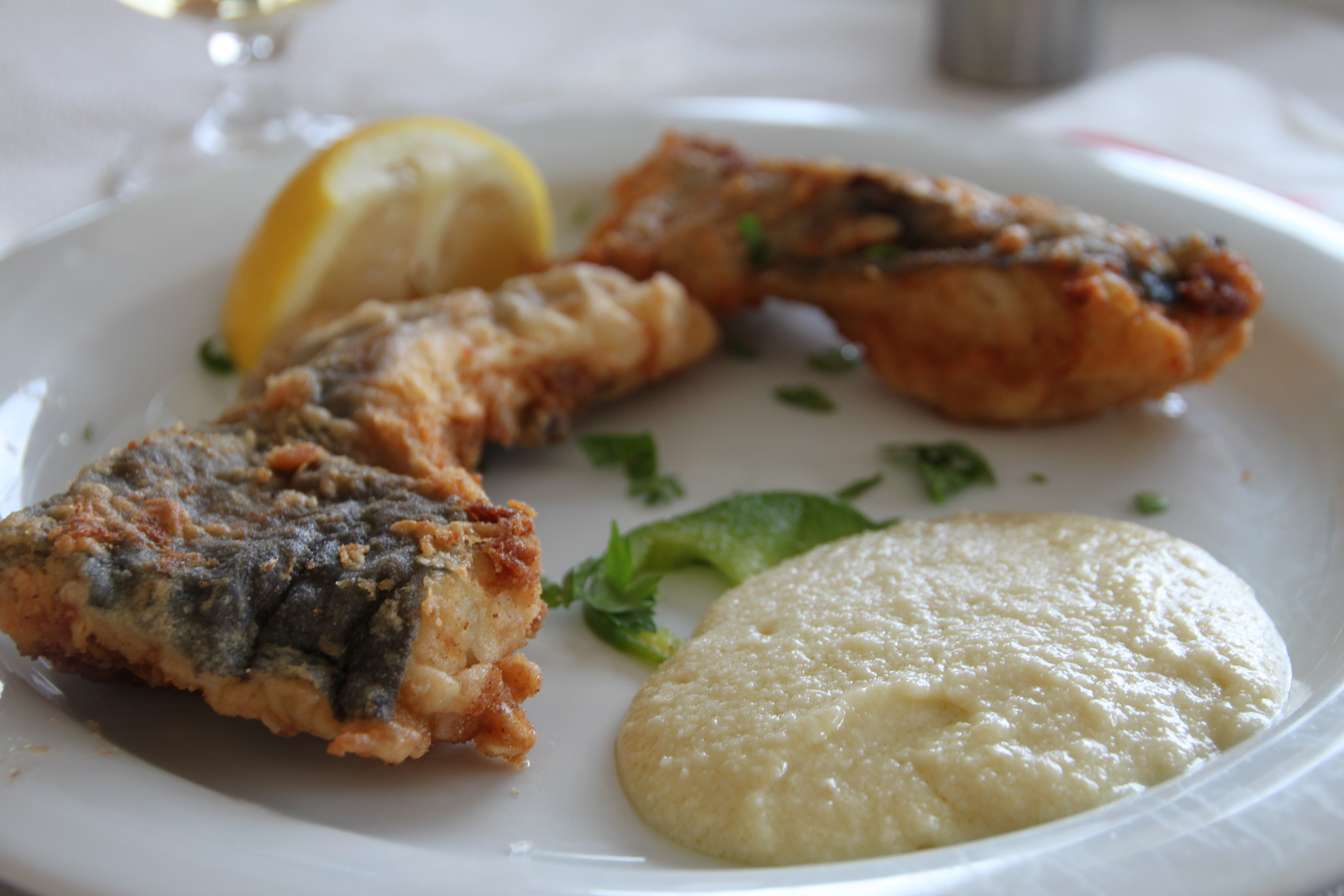
- Skordalia (lower right) with batter-fried cod, how it is traditionally served in Greece.
- Type: Puree
- Region or state: Greece
- Main ingredients: Garlic
- Ingredients generally used: Potatoes, walnuts, almonds, bread, olive oil

Skordalia (alternatively skordhalia or skorthalia) (Greek: σκορδαλιά [skorðaˈʎa], also called αλιάδα, aliada/aliatha) is a thick purée in Greek cuisine, made of garlic in a base of potatoes, walnuts, almonds or liquid-soaked stale bread mixed with olive oil in to make a smooth emulsion, to which some vinegar is added. It is usually made in a mortar and pestle. Skordalia is served as a garnish or side dish. It is mainly served with batter-fried cod, especially during Lent and on the Greek national holiday of March 25th. In the Anglosphere, it is promoted as a dip.

== Overview ==
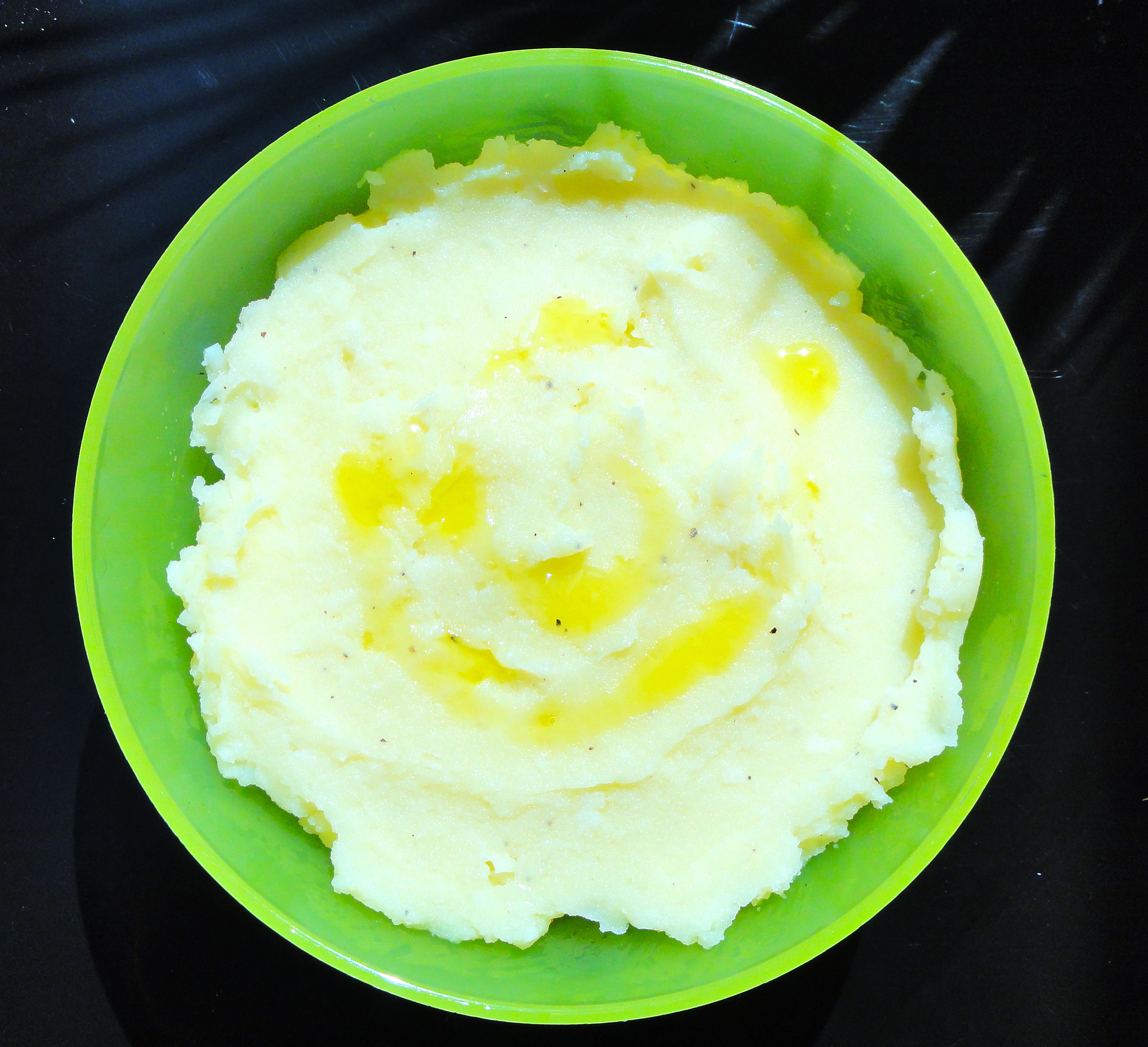
A plate with skordalia

Skordalia is the modern equivalent of ancient skorothalmi. The name, on the other hand, may be a pleonastic compound of Greek σκόρδο [ˈskorðo] 'garlic' and Italian agliata [aʎˈʎaːta] 'garlicky'.

Skordalia is usually served with batter-fried fish (notably salt cod, μπακαλιάρος), fried vegetables (notably eggplant and zucchini), poached fish, or boiled vegetables (notably beets). It is sometimes used as a dip.

Variants of skordalia may include eggs as the emulsifier, omitting or reducing the bulk ingredient, which makes for a result similar to the Provençal aïoli and Catalan allioli. In the Ionian Islands, cod stock and lemon are usually added instead of vinegar, and then skordalia is eaten as a main dish.

== See also ==
- Agliata – an Italian garlic sauce
- Aioli – a Provençal and Catalan garlic sauce
- Garlic sauce
- Tzatziki – a sauce of cucumber, garlic, and yoghurt
- Toum – a Levantine garlic sauce
- Bread sauce
- List of bread dishes
- List of dips
- List of garlic dishes
- List of sauces
