= Agliata =

Italian garlic sauce and condiment

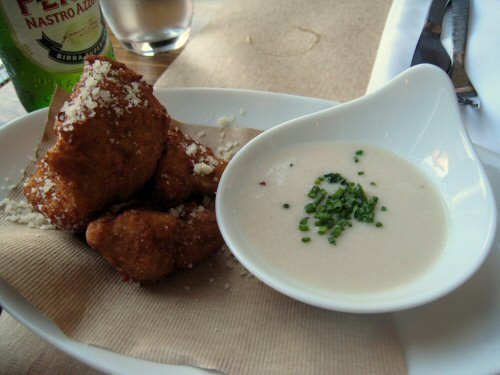
Fried cauliflower with agliata sauce (right)

Agliata (from aglio, lit. 'garlic'; Italian: [aʎˈʎaːta]; Ligurian: aggiadda, Ligurian: [aˈdʒadˑa]) is a pungent, savoury garlic sauce and condiment in Italian cuisine used to flavour and accompany grilled or boiled meats, fish and vegetables. It is first attested in ancient Rome, and it remains part of the cuisine of Liguria. Porrata is a similar sauce prepared with leeks in place of garlic.

== Preparation ==
Agliata is prepared with crushed garlic, olive oil, bread crumbs, vinegar, salt and pepper. The bread crumbs are soaked in vinegar, which is then squeezed out, after which the garlic is whisked or beaten into the mixture. Its preparation includes the emulsion of the ingredients to prevent separation, which is performed by the olive oil being added in a slow drizzle while the mixture is constantly whisked. It generally accompanies grilled or boiled meat, fish and vegetables.

== History ==
The origins of agliata date to ancient Rome. It has been described as a social-class crossover — typical peasant food also used by upper-class people. The Venetian, a 14th-century cookbook, stated that agliata can be served "with all kinds of meat", as reported by the Liber de Coquina, first published in the 13th century, where it is stated it can be used to "accompany any kind of meat".

Agliata is used in the cuisine of Liguria to accompany meats and fish, and has been described as "a Ligurian classic". It is still commonly used in Italian cooking.

== Similar foods ==
Porrata sauce is prepared using all of the ingredients in agliata except for the garlic, which is substituted with leeks (porri in Italian).

== See also ==
- List of condiments
- List of sauces
- Aioli – West Mediterranean sauce of garlic and oil
- Mujdei – spicy Romanian sauce made mostly from garlic and vegetable oil
- Skordalia – thick garlic sauce in Greek cuisine
- Toum – garlic sauce common in the Levant
