= Aioli =

West Mediterranean sauce of garlic and oil

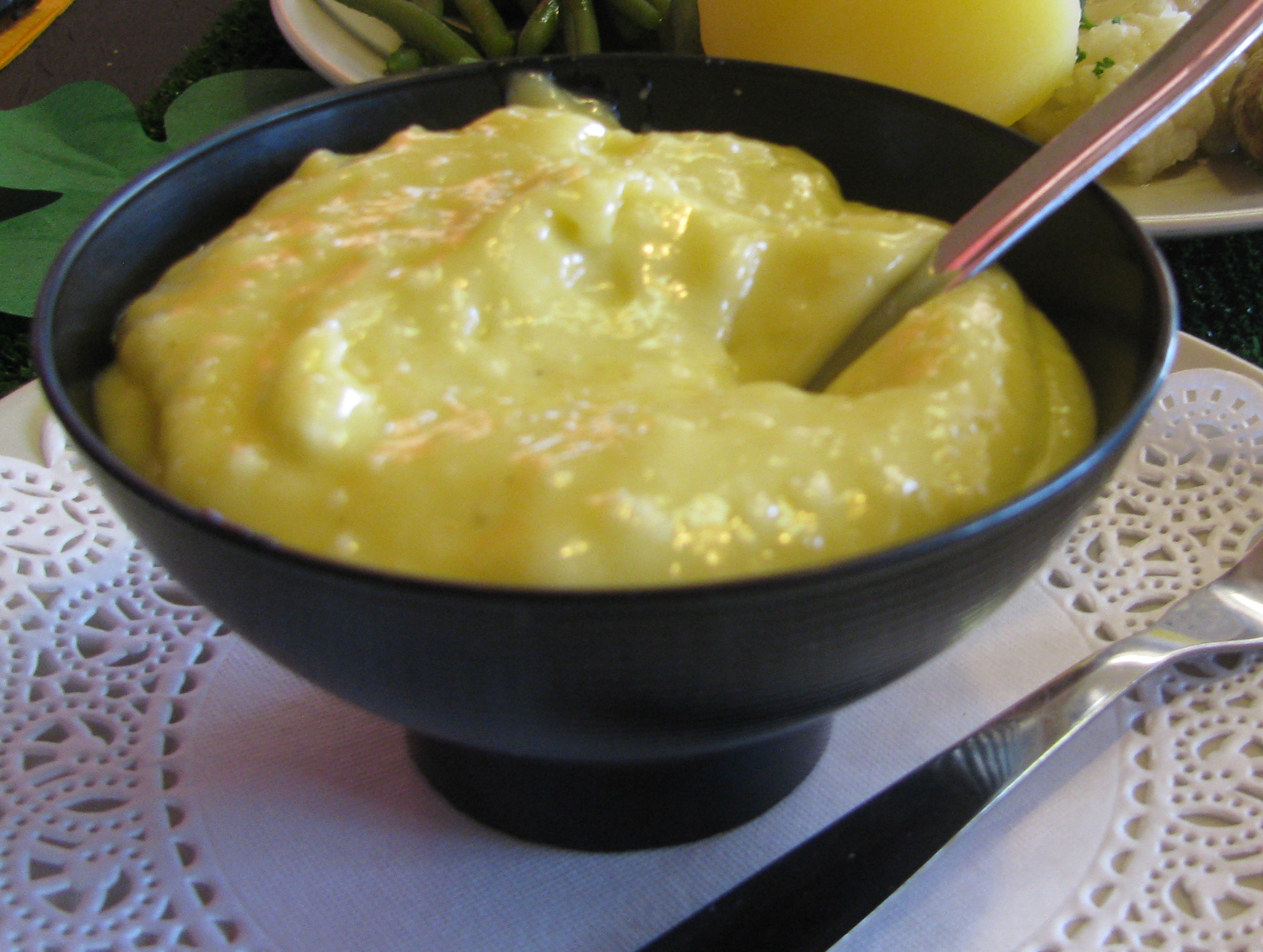
- Type: Sauce
- Place of origin: Catalonia/Occitan regions of France and Spain
- Main ingredients: Olive oil, garlic, sometimes eggs

Aioli, allioli, or aïoli (/aɪˈoʊli, eɪ-/) (Note: Provençal Occitan: alhòli [aˈʎɔli] or aiòli [aˈjɔli]; Catalan: allioli [ˌaʎiˈɔli]; Spanish: alioli [aˈljoli]; French: aïoli [ajɔli]) is a cold garlic sauce consisting of an emulsion of garlic and olive oil, in the cuisines of the northwestern Mediterranean.

The names mean 'garlic and oil' in Catalan and Provençal. It is found in the cuisines of southeastern France (Provence, Languedoc, Roussillon) and eastern Spain (traditionally Catalonia and to a lesser extent the Valencian Community, the Balearic Islands, Murcia, and eastern Andalusia).

Some versions of the sauce are closer to a garlic mayonnaise, incorporating egg yolks and lemon juice, while other versions omit egg yolk and contain more garlic. The garlic gives the sauce a pastier texture, making it more laborious to produce as the emulsion is harder to stabilise. There are many variations, such as adding lemon juice or other seasonings. In France, it may include mustard.

In Malta, arjoli or ajjoli is different; it is made with galletti (a type of cracker), tomato, onion, garlic, and herbs.

Like mayonnaise, aioli is an emulsion or suspension of small globules of oil and oil-soluble compounds in water and water-soluble compounds. Many older recipes do not include egg, but nowadays, egg or egg yolk is the usual emulsifier.

Since about 1990, it has become common in the United States to call all flavored mayonnaises aioli. Purists insist that true aioli must contain garlic and no other seasoning (except salt).

== Etymology ==
In the form aioli, the word is a compound of Provençal ai 'garlic' and oli 'oil'.

The English spelling comes from the French aïoli, which is an adaptation of an Occitan term. The spelling in Occitan may be alhòli, following the classical norm, or aiòli, following the Mistralian norm. In Catalan it is spelled allioli (pronounced [ˌaʎiˈɔli]). The most common term in Spanish is alioli, an adaptation from Catalan, although there are alternative Spanish terms such as ajoaceite, ajiaceite, ajolio or ajaceite. It is also spelled alioli in Galician.

== Basic recipe ==
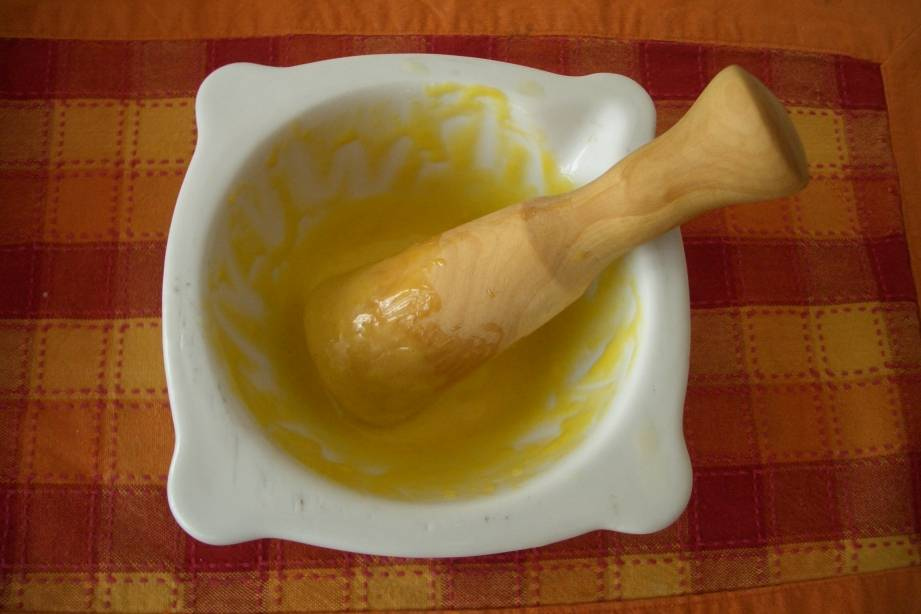
The sauce is traditionally made with a mortar and pestle

Garlic is crushed in a mortar and pestle and emulsified with salt and olive oil.

Today, aioli is often made in a food processor or blender, but some traditionalists object that this does not give the same result.

== Serving ==
In Occitan cuisine, aioli is typically served with seafood, fish soup, and croutons. An example is a dish called merluça amb alhòli. In the Occitan Alps it is served with potatoes boiled with salt and bay laurel.

In Provençal cuisine, aioli or, more formally, le grand aïoli, aioli garni, or aïoli monstre is a dish consisting of various boiled vegetables (usually carrots, potatoes, artichokes, and green beans), poached fish (normally soaked salt cod), snails, canned tuna, other seafood, and boiled eggs, all served with aioli. This dish is often served during the festivities on the feast days of the patron saint of Provençal villages and towns. It is traditional to serve it with snails for Christmas Eve and with cod on Ash Wednesday. Aïoli is so strongly associated with Provence that when the poet Frédéric Mistral started a regionalist Provençal-language newspaper in 1891, he called it L'Aiòli.

The Provençal cuisine fish soup bourride is generally served with aioli.

In Spain, particularly in Catalan cuisine and Valencian cuisine, allioli is often served with arròs negre, arròs a banda, fideuà, with grilled snails (cargols a la llauna), grilled meat, lamb, rabbit, vegetables, boiled cod (bacallà a la catalana, bacallà amb patates) and comes in other varieties such as allioli de codony (allioli with boiled quince, not the preserve) or allioli with boiled pear. Other commonly used vegetables are beets, fennel, celery, zucchini, cauliflower, chickpeas, and raw tomatoes.

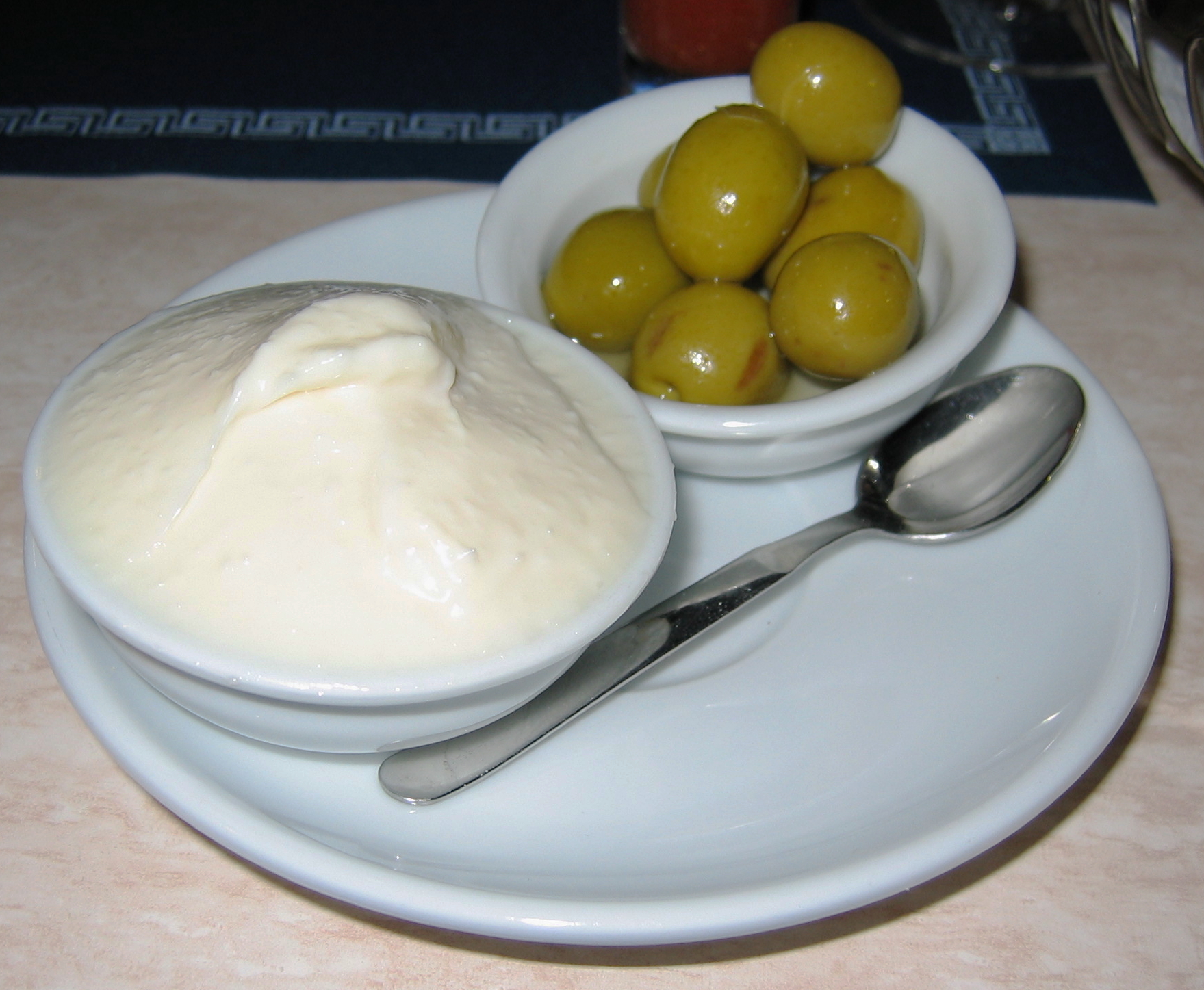
Aioli served with olives

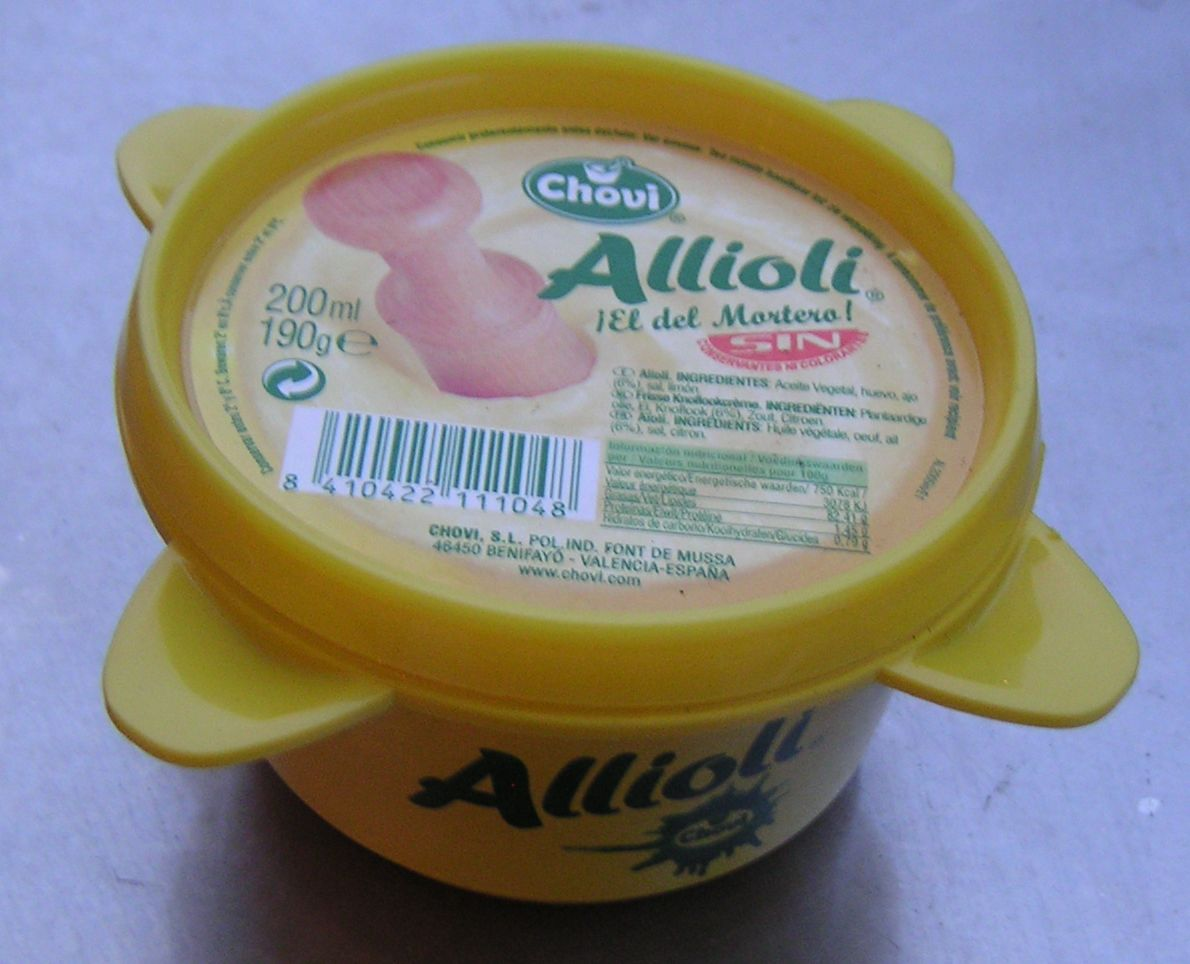
Allioli from a Spanish supermarket

== See also ==
- Dipping sauce – Type of condiment
- Garlic sauce – Sauce with garlic as a main ingredient
  - Agliata – Italian garlic sauce and condiment
  - Mujdei – Romanian garlic and vegetable oil sauce
  - Skordalia – Thick garlic sauce in Greek cuisine
  - Toum – Garlic sauce common in the Levant
- List of garlic dishes
- Makalo – Macedonian dipping sauce typically made from garlic and oil
