= Marie-Antoine Carême =

French chef (died 1833)

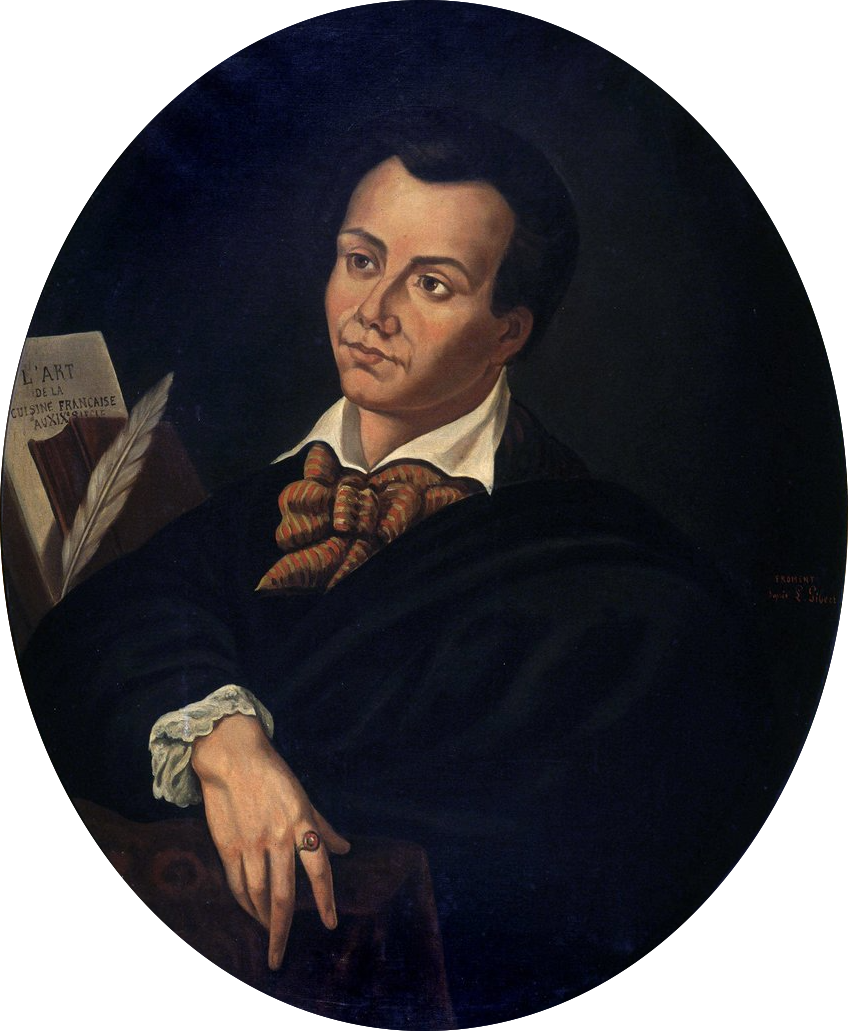
- Portrait by Charles de Steuben
- Born: 8 June 1783 or 1784 (Note: In a 2021 biography of Carême, Marie-Pierre Rey notes that if there were ever any parish registers or official civil documents recording the birth they were destroyed in the turmoil of the Paris Commune a hundred years later. Biographers who give 1783 as the year of birth include Rey, Georges Bernier (1989) and Ian Kelly (2004). 1784 is put forward in the Nouvelle biographie universelle (1852), Larousse Gastronomique and the Bibliothèque nationale de France.); Paris, France
- Died: 12 January 1833 (aged 48–49); Paris, France
- Other name: Antonin Carême
- Occupations: Chef; author

Marie-Antoine Carême (French: [maʁi ɑ̃twan kaʁɛːm]; 8 June 1783 or 1784 – 12 January 1833), also known as Antonin Carême, was a French chef and author who specialised in grande cuisine for the elite society.

Carême was born in Paris to a poor family and, when still a child, worked in a cheap restaurant. Later he became an apprentice to a leading Parisian pâtissier and quickly became known for his patisserie skills. He was deeply interested in architecture and was famous for his large pièces montées – table decorations sculpted in sugar, depicting classical buildings.

Working with leading chefs of the day, Carême extended his knowledge to cover all aspects of cooking, and became head chef to prominent people including Charles Maurice de Talleyrand-Périgord, Tsar Alexander I of Russia and the Prince Regent in Britain. He codified and to some extent simplified classical French cookery, insisted on the finest and most expensive ingredients, and was regarded as the foremost chef of his day.

Carême wrote a series of books, lavishly illustrated, intended to pass his skills on to other chefs providing grande cuisine for the elite of French, and other, society. His influence continued after his death; his approach was continued by Jules Gouffé, Urbain Dubois and Émile Bernard, reinvigorated by Auguste Escoffier and continued until it was overtaken by nouvelle cuisine in the second half of the 20th century.

== Life and career ==
=== Early years ===
Marie-Antoine Carême, known throughout his life as Antonin Carême, was born in Paris. The date of his birth cannot be authenticated and is disputed. The day and month are generally accepted as 8 June and the year as either 1783 or 1784. He was one of the many children of Marie-Jeanne Pascal and Jean-Gilbert Carême. The father was a construction worker, and the family lived in what Carême's biographers Philippe Alexandre and Béatrice de l'Aulnoit call a baraque – a shack – in what was then a poor part of Paris, near the rue du Bac and the rue de Sèvres. The French Revolution, starting in 1789, brought large-scale building work in Paris to a temporary halt, leaving Carême's father struggling to feed the family. Carême went to work at an early age at a Parisian gargote (Note: Defined by the Dictionnaire de l'Académie française as a "Restaurant à bas prix, où l'on sert une nourriture médiocre" − a low-cost restaurant, serving mediocre food.) – the most basic and modest kind of restaurant – thought to have been called À la fricassée de lapin.

There have been two contrasting explanations of how this came about. By Carême's account his father took him from home in the latter part of 1792 and sent him on his way alone, bidding him, with some touching words, to find a house that would take him in. (Note: "Go, little one, go well; in the world there are good jobs; let us languish; misery is our lot; we must die there. This is a time of good fortunes; you just need the spirit to make one, and you have it. Go, little one, and perhaps tonight or tomorrow some good house will open for you: go with what God has given you".) In the words of a biographer who accepts this version of events:

The boy thus abandoned, could have knocked on the door of a carpenter or of a locksmith or of a clothes merchant. Destiny led him to a humble cookshop, the owner of which gave him his first lesson in cooking.

More recent biographers have raised the possibility that this is a fanciful account, and that the family simply arranged for the gargotier to take the boy on.

Accounts differ also about the next stage of Carême's early years. Some biographers portray him as remaining at the gargote for more than five years, sweeping, washing, running errands, serving at table, and later, when he was considered mature enough, helping in the preparation of food. A conflicting account is that he left after a few months and moved to work for a baker in the rue Saint-Honoré, known as Père Ducrest. A contemporary recorded after Carême's death that the boy was to be seen hurrying through the streets delivering his employer's wares, before returning in the evening to Ducrest's kitchen, where he slept. By this account, Carême was taught to read and write by Alexis Eymery (fr), the tutor of Ducrest's children.

=== Apprentice pâtissier ===
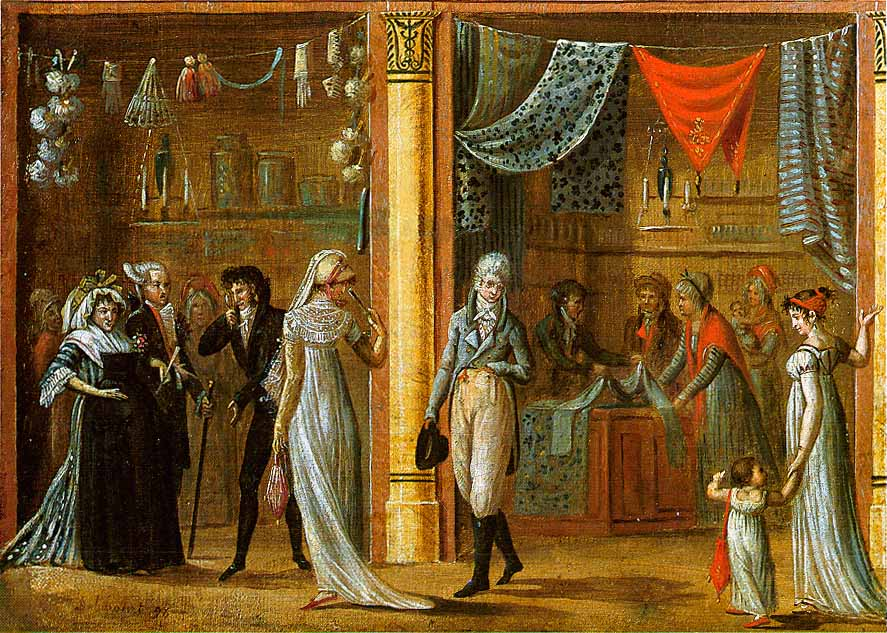
"Promenade de la galerie du Palais-Royal", 1798

Carême's history is more reliably documented from 1798, when he began an apprenticeship at Sylvain Bailly's patisserie-restaurant in the rue Vivienne. This was a step up, in career terms, as in post-revolutionary Paris, patisserie was the most prestigious branch of the culinary arts, and Bailly was among its most fêted practitioners, recommended by the influential Almanach des Gourmands, (Note: The author of the Almanach, Grimod de La Reynière, later came to admire Carême so much that he asked that a copy of "Le Pâtissier royal by the illustrious Carême" should be buried with him.) and with customers including the French foreign minister, Talleyrand. Bailly's establishment was within a hundred paces of the fashionable and bustling Palais-Royal, and among Carême's early tasks was to go there to encourage visitors to come to his employer's restaurant.

As an apprentice pastry-cook Carême began as a tourier, or turner, working the dough and repeatedly folding and rolling it to achieve the perfect puff pastry. He gained outstanding skill at this, and later put it to use in two confections with which he became particularly associated: the vol-au-vent and mille-feuille. One of Bailly's most celebrated offerings was gâteau de plomb; Carême suggested how to make it lighter, and invented decorations with which to top it. He steadily rose to a position of responsibility. Bailly allowed him to take two afternoons off each week to visit the old royal library (subsequently the Bibliothèque nationale) across the road from the restaurant. He read voraciously − not only cookery books from other countries and different eras, but also works about his other great interest, architecture. Of the latter he later wrote:

Egypt, Greece and Italy inspired me with a taste for architecture; but ... my financial means prevented me from devoting myself to that fine career. I had to repress this noble wish, without ceasing to admire what antiquity has produced, wonderful in its masculine and imposing architecture.

Bailly was conscious of the need to innovate and attract new customs. He wanted eye-catching pièces montées – elaborate displays of patisserie – in his windows. Sculpting in sugar paste had been well known in the Ancien Régime but had become neglected after the revolution. Carême helped to revive the art, creating croquembouches and extravagant showpieces based on the ancient architecture he had studied in the library. He is credited with saying, later, "The fine arts are five in number: music, painting, sculpture, poetry and architecture – of which the principal branch is confectionery". His constructions, featuring Greek columns and temples, Chinese pagodas and Egyptian pyramids, attracted widespread attention and approbation. His enthusiasm, then and later in his career, sometimes led him to conflate in a single pièce montée details from several widely differing architectural eras and styles.

=== Professional progress ===
After staying with Bailly for three years Carême joined another celebrated pâtissier, Gendron, who was based in the rue des Petits-Champs. Carême liked working for Gendron, where his talents were appreciated by prestigious customers including the finance minister, the marquis de Barbé-Marbois. Carême benefited from the flexible conditions offered by Gendron, being allowed to freelance, catering for important banquets. In 1803 he opened his own shop in the rue de la Paix, trading there for a decade. In tandem with running his shop he built what one biographer calls "an intermittent but spectacular career", first as a specialist pastry-cook and later as chef de cuisine, at the great imperial, social, and governmental banquets. In October 1808, Carême married Henriette Sophy Mahy de Chitenay. They had no children, although Carême later had a daughter, Marie, with another woman, Agatha Guichardet.

In addition to his skills as a pastry-cook, Carême became expert in the other branches of cookery. He was influenced by earlier cooks and food writers, and studied Vincent La Chapelle's Le cuisinier moderne (1736), Joseph Menon's Soupers de la cour (1758) and Lémery's Traité des alimens (1792). He worked for or alongside leading Parisian chefs; he later wrote:

It was under Messrs. Richaut, the famous sauciers of the house of Condé, that I learned the preparation of sauces; during the splendid festivities held at the Hôtel de Ville in Paris under the command of M. L'Asne that I learned the best part of cold buffet cookery; at the Élysée Napoléon under the auspices of Messrs. Robert and Laguipère that I learned the elegance of modern cookery and the running of a large establishment.

From 1803 to 1814 Carême worked as chef-pâtissier in the kitchens of Talleyrand at the Hôtel de Galliffet, under the head chef, Boucher. He continued to learn about the arts of cookery in general, and was engaged to cater for special events such as the festivities for the marriage of Jérôme Bonaparte to Catharina of Württemberg (1807) and of that of Napoleon to Marie-Louise of Austria (1810). Although of an age liable for conscription into the army, Carême was not called up; Talleyrand may have secured an exemption for him, but that is not certain.

=== Professional pinnacle ===
After the defeat of Napoleon in 1814, the British and Russians occupied Paris. Talleyrand, anxious to be on friendly terms with the allies, invited Tsar Alexander I to stay with him and tasked Carême with delighting his guest with a continual series of fine meals. According to the biographer Marie-Pierre Rey, "Talleyrand's generous hospitality undoubtedly had positive effects on the tsar's mood and the magnanimity that he showed to the French state".

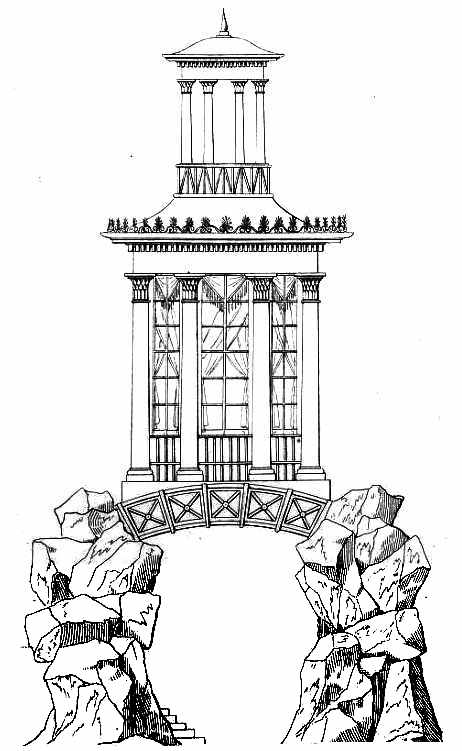
"Pavillon athénien" from Carême's Le Pâtissier pittoresque, 1815

After staying with Talleyrand for some weeks, the tsar took up residence in the Élysée Palace, and requested that Carême should be his head chef there during his stay. The biographer Georges Bernier (fr) writes that this appointment put Carême at the pinnacle of his profession. Already a renowned pastry-cook, he had risen further, to be chef de cuisine to the most powerful man in Europe, reflecting his employer's status with suitable culinary magnificence. The following year, after Napoleon's brief return and final defeat at Waterloo, Alexander returned to Paris, and again secured Carême's services.

When the tsar assembled his troops for a grand review at Châlons-sur-Marne, Carême had to provide three banquets for 300 people each, despite enormous logistical difficulties. There were few supplies available locally and food, wines, linens, glassware and even herds of cattle and flocks of sheep had to be transported from Paris, over 80 miles (130 km) away. In addition, Carême had to cope with the tsar's preference for Russian service – a succession of individual courses – rather than the traditional French service, in which numerous dishes were set out on the table on hot plates and kept under cloches to keep warm. (Note: Sources differ as to whose preference prevailed. According to Kelly, Carême had his way and the service was à la française; according to Darra Goldstein, at the tsar's insistence the service was à la russe.) In Carême's view, "This [Russian] manner of service is assuredly favourable to good cheer; but our French service is more elegant and sumptuous. Is there anything more imposing than the sight of a grand table served à la française?" Despite Carême's opposition, service à la russe gradually supplanted the old French service throughout Europe as the 19th century progressed. (Note: Kelly speculates that by drawing attention to the question, Carême may have hastened the popularisation of service à la russe, in general use since the late 19th century.)

In 1815 Carême published his first books. Le Pâtissier royal parisien was an illustrated two-volume compilation of recipes for a skilled pastry-cook. Le Pâtissier pittoresque focused on piéces montées, with over 100 of Carême's drawings of designs, together with what the food writer Barbara Wheaton calls "more or less sketchy instructions" for executing them.

In 1816 Carême accepted the position of chef to the Prince Regent, based at Carlton House in London and the Royal Pavilion in Brighton. This was Carême's first venture outside France. He was paid an unprecedentedly high salary, and the prince was full of praise for his creations, but Carême was unhappy in his post. He hated the English weather, particularly the fogs, which exacerbated the respiratory problems he had after years of working in smoky kitchens. He found the prince's domestic staff unfriendly, even the French footmen, and he later wrote that he endured l'ennui extrême and mal du pays – he was bored and homesick. He returned to France in late 1817 with no firm plans for his immediate future.

=== St Petersburg, Paris and Vienna ===
Tsar Alexander returned to Paris in 1818, en route to an international congress at Aix-la-Chapelle. Carême's friend Muller, comptroller of the tsar's household (and dedicatee of Le Pâtissier pittoresque), convinced Alexander that having Carême cook for the Russian delegation would enhance its standing, and approached him with the proposal that he should work for the tsar at Aix and then travel with him to Russia. Carême agreed to go to Aix, with a handsome salary and lavish budget, but declined to go on to Russia.

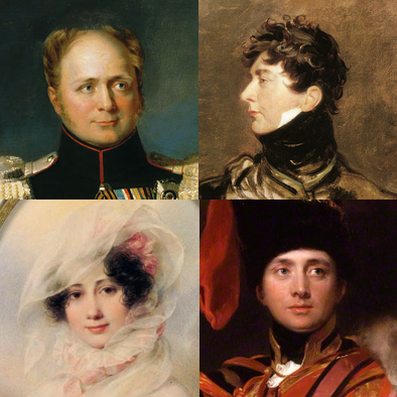
Carême was chef to (clockwise from top left) Tsar Alexander I, the Prince Regent, Lord Stewart and Princess Bagration, among others.

After briefly working in Austria and England for Lord Stewart, the British ambassador to Vienna, Carême decided to take up the tsar's offer, (Note: According to one theory he did so at Talleyrand's behest, but this is far from certain.) and he went by sea to St Petersburg in mid-1819. The timing was unfortunate for him: as he arrived, the tsar was leaving for a forty-day visit to Archangel. In his absence, Carême spent time exploring the architecture of St Petersburg, which he found inspiring – "the most beautiful city in the world". Otherwise, by the time the tsar returned, Carême was disenchanted with Russia, its food and the arrangements at the court. He left at the end of August.

On his return to Paris, Carême became head chef to Princess Catherine Bagration, a distant cousin of the tsar and widow of the celebrated general Pyotr Bagration, killed at the Battle of Borodino in 1812. Carême enjoyed working for the princess, who lived in style and had a discerning appreciation of food, but poor health prevented her from entertaining on the extensive scale that would fully occupy a chef of his standing. Lord Stewart successfully urged Carême to return to work for him.

While working for Stewart, Carême introduced what became the international symbol of the chef: the toque hat. Until then, chefs had generally worn loose berets or cotton caps resembling nightcaps. Carême felt that the latter were reminiscent of the sickroom and "made us look ill" whereas the appearance of a chef should "announce the man in good health". The toque was quickly taken up by chefs in Vienna, and then in Paris and elsewhere.

Carême continued to write, and in 1821 he published two volumes of his thoughts on architecture. Projets d'architecture dédiés a Alexandre 1 contained drawings of his suggestions for new buildings in St Petersburg, and the second volume, Projets d'architecture pour l'embellisement de Paris, did the same for his native city. The following year he returned to the subject of catering in his Le maître d'hotel français, comparing old and new cuisine and detailing seasonal menus that he had presented in Paris, St Petersburg, London and Vienna. The title reflected Carême's firm conviction that the head chef should control and supervise not only the cooking of the food, but its service as well.

=== Last years ===
Carême's last salaried post came in 1823 as chef to the banker James Rothschild and his wife Betty. Rothschild was by far the richest man in France, and Carême was as happy to work for a nouveau-riche employer as for royalty. Rothschild had bought the former house of Napoleon's stepdaughter, Hortense de Beauharnais, at 19 rue Lafitte (a few hundred metres from the rue Vivienne, where Carême had been apprenticed). The Rothschilds paid Carême a large salary, and allowed him substantial time off to continue writing his books. He published Le Cuisinier parisien in 1828. With him in charge of the catering, the Rothschilds' house became the focal point of Parisian high society, and Carême's name was continually featured in the press.

By the end of the decade it was clear to his employers and to Carême that his health was in decline. (Note: Wheaton writes, "No doubt he was worn out by a life that began in deprivation and continued with the stress of organising so many high-visibility meals and with his decades of hard work in carbon-monoxide-laden kitchens; there is a moving passage in his last book in which he displays great sympathy for those working in kitchens, and describes vividly the terrible conditions with which they (and he) had to contend".) The Rothschilds offered him land on which to retire on their country estate, but he preferred to remain in Paris. He declined a final effort by the former Prince Regent, now George IV, to tempt him back to England, and retired to his house in the rue Neuve-Saint-Roch near the Tuileries.

In retirement, Carême worked on his last project, L'Art de la cuisine française au XIX siécle – "The Art of French Cookery in the 19th Century". It was to be a five-volume work, extensively illustrated; he lived to complete the first three volumes. His pupil, Armand Plumerey, (Note: Plumerey – also spelled Pluméry – trained under Carême in Talleyrand's kitchens and was later head chef to the Princess Poniatowski and then to the Russian ambassador to Paris.) added the remaining two volumes that Carême had planned.

Carême died, mentally alert to the end, at his Paris home on 12 January 1833, aged 48 or 49. He was buried in the Montmartre Cemetery.

== Reputation and legacy ==
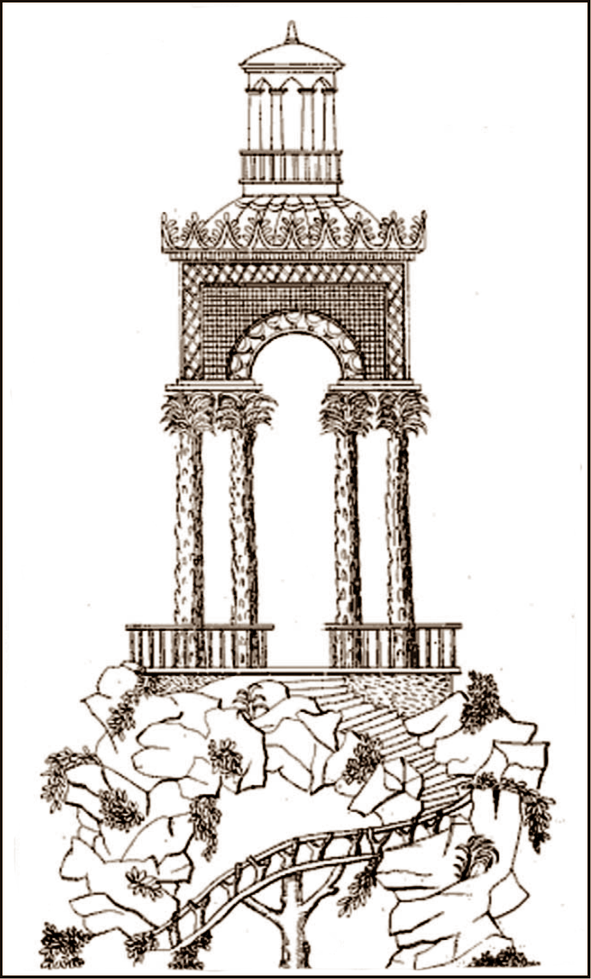
Carême's design for a sugar-paste sculpture of a Parisian bower

Carême was known as "the king of chefs and the chef of kings". Wheaton comments that although he remains the most famous of 19th-century French chefs, there are two differing schools of thought about him. "Gastronomes and food writers have praised him as a great genius of haute cuisine", and have held him up as "an outstanding example of how a lowly apprentice, of a humble background, could rise to the topmost pinnacle of his profession". An opposing view is that he was conceited, his prose inelegant, his menus "pretentious and heavy" and his pièces montées an extravagant waste of ingredients. In Wheaton's judgement "the truth lies somewhere in between".

Carême is credited with codifying the key sauces – the mother sauces, or in his phrase, the grandes sauces – on which classic French haute cuisine is based. His recipes for Velouté, Béchamel, Allemande, and Espagnole became standard for French chefs of his day. His classifications were retained, with modifications, by later chefs including Auguste Escoffier, and the concept of mother sauces continued to be acknowledged by subsequent generations of cooks, including James Beard and Julia Child.

The work of Carême was aimed at the elite of French and other societies. The food writer Stephen Mennell writes that Carême's cuisine was not merely haute but grande, and in one of his books the chef advised people of lesser means not to attempt his elaborate style of cooking: "Better to serve a simple meal, well-prepared, and not try to cover the bourgeois table with an imitation of the rich". He reacted against some traditional practices, such as garnishing meat with fish and vice versa, and he either invented or refined several features of French cookery, including choux pastry, vol-au-vents, profiteroles, and mille-feuilles.

Carême's influence continued after his death; his approach was continued by Jules Gouffé, Urbain Dubois and Émile Bernard, reinvigorated by Escoffier and continued until haute cuisine was supplanted by nouvelle cuisine and simpler styles of cooking in the second half of the 20th century.

== Works by Carême ==
Year	Title	Subtitle	Subtitle translated	Publisher	Ref
1815	Le Pâtissier royal parisien Vol 1 and Vol 2	Traité élémentaire et pratique de la pâtisserie ancienne et moderne: suivi d'observations utiles aux progrès de cet art, et d'une revue critique des grands bals de 1810 et 1811	Elementary and practical treatise on ancient and modern pastry: followed by observations useful for the progress of this art, and a critical review of the great balls of 1810 and 1811	Dentu, Paris	
1815	Le Pâtissier pittoresque	Précédé d'un traité des cinq ordres d'architecture	Preceded by a treatise on the five orders of architecture	Didot, Paris	
1821	Projets d'architecture, dédiés à Alexandre 1er, empereur de toutes les Russies			Didot, Paris	
1821	Projets d'architecture pour l'embellissement de Paris			Didot, Paris	
1822	Le Maître d'hôtel français Vol 1 and Vol 2	Parallèle de la cuisine ancienne et moderne, considérée sous le rapport de l'ordonnance des menus selon les quatre saisons	Parallel of ancient and modern cuisine, considered in relation to the order of menus according to the four seasons	Didot, Paris	
1828	Le Cuisinier parisien	L'art de la cuisine française au 19 siècle	The art of French cuisine in the 19th century	Didot, Paris	
1833–1847	L'art de la cuisine française au dix-neuvième siècle Volumes 1–3 by Carême; Volumes 4–5 by Plumerey			Dentu, Paris	

== Notes, references and sources ==
=== Sources ===
==== Books ====
- Alexandre, Philippe; Béatrix de l'Aulnoit (2015). Le Roi Carême (in French) (Kindle ed.). Paris: Albin Michel. ISBN 978-2-226-30045-4.
- Beard, James (1977). Theory & Practice of Good Cooking. New York: Knopf. ISBN 978-0-89043-108-5.
- Bernier, Georges (1989). Antonin Carême, 1783–1833: la sensualité gourmande en Europe (in French). Paris: Grasset. ISBN 978-2-246-42071-2.
- Carême, Antonin (1815). Le pâtissier royal parisien (in French). Paris: Dentu. OCLC 1045241366.
- Carême, Antonin (1822). Le maitre-d'hôtel français (in French). Paris: Renouard. OCLC 1040640006.
- Child, Julia (2008). Julia's Kitchen Wisdom. New York: Knopf. ISBN 978-0-375-41151-9.
- Davidson, Alan (1999). "Sugar paste". In Alan Davidson (ed.). The Oxford Companion to Food. Oxford: Oxford University Press. ISBN 978-0-19-211579-9.
- Davis, Jennifer (2013). Defining Culinary Authority: The Transformation of Cooking in France, 1650–1830. Baton Rouge: Louisiana State University Press. ISBN 978-0-80-714533-3.
- Grimod de La Reynière, Alexandre-Balthazar-Laurent (1803). Almanach des gourmands (in French). Paris: Maradan. OCLC 1040260755.
- Hoefer, M. (1852). Nouvelle biographie universelle (in French). Paris: Firmin Didot fréres. OCLC 1049964003.
- Hyman, Philip; Mary Hyman (1999). "French cookbooks". In Alan Davidson (ed.). The Oxford Companion to Food. Oxford: Oxford University Press. ISBN 978-0-19-211579-9.
- Kelly, Ian (2004). Cooking for Kings: The Life of Antonin Carême, the First Celebrity Chef. London: Short. ISBN 978-1-904095-93-4.
- Mennell, Stephen (1996). All Manners of Food: Eating and Taste in England and France from the Middle Ages to the Present. Urbana: University of Illinois Press. ISBN 978-0-252-06490-6.
- Montagné, Prosper (1976). Larousse gastronomique. London: Hamlyn. OCLC 1285641881.
- Plumerey, Armand (1847). L'art de la cuisine française au dix-neuviême siêcle (in French). Vol. 5. Paris: Fayot. OCLC 969509254.
- Rey, Marie-Pierre (2021). Le premier des chefs: l'exceptionnel destin d'Antonin Carême (in French). Paris: Flammarion. ISBN 978-2-08-142057-1.
- Robinson, Jancis (2014). The Oxford Companion to Wine (fourth ed.). Oxford: Oxford University Press. ISBN 978-0-19-870538-3.
- Snodgrass, Mary Ellen (2004). Encyclopedia of Kitchen History. London: Taylor & Francis. ISBN 978-1-280-25674-5.
- Wheaton, Barbara (1999). "Carême, Antonin". In Alan Davidson (ed.). The Oxford Companion to Food. Oxford: Oxford University Press. ISBN 978-0-19-211579-9.

==== Journals ====
- Goldstein, Darra (1995). "Russia, Carême, and the Culinary Arts". The Slavonic and East European Review. 73 (4): 691–715. JSTOR 4211935. (subscription required)
