= Fritto misto =

Italian fried selection of meat or fish and vegetables

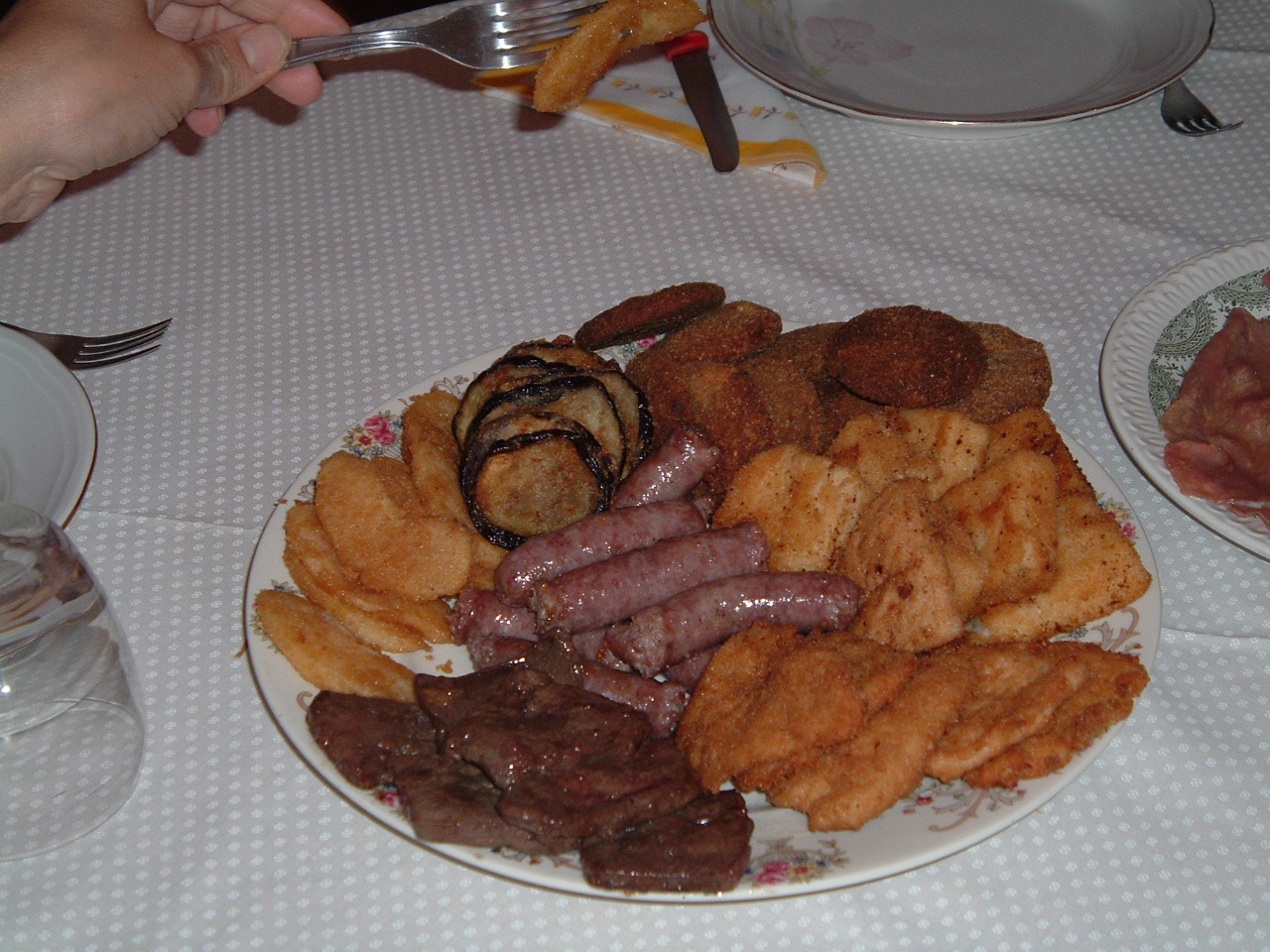
- Type: Antipasto or main course
- Place of origin: Italy
- Main ingredients: Meat or fish and vegetables

Fritto misto (lit. 'mixed fry') is a mainly savoury dish popular in the cooking of various regions of Italy; a range of ingredients – meat, fish and vegetables – may be used: the ingredients are cut into small strips and deep-fried in oil. Each region varies the ingredients for its local version. Fritto misto may be served as an appetiser (antipasto) or as a one-plate buffet dish. In some places and at some times it has been cooked and served as street food. In many variants of the dish some sweet elements, such as fried apples or amaretti di Saronno biscuits, are included along with the meat, fish and vegetables.

== History ==
Fritto misto stall, Rome, 1816

Fritto misto has been familiar in Italy for many years. An engraving made in 1803 shows fritto misto being handed to a family group, and another, from 1816, shows an outdoor wood-burning stove, heating a cauldron of oil in which the fryer cooks his pieces of battered meat or fish while his assistant wraps a helping into a cone of paper for a customer. The dish was known to non-Italians by the mid-19th century: it is mentioned in Sand and Canvas (London, 1849) in a chapter reporting on eating out in Rome:

a sort of omnium gatherum, as its name implies, consisting generally of small portions of calve's head, liver, brains, artichoke, cabbage leaves, cauliflowers and young gourds, fried in fat

The Parisian chefs Urbain Dubois and Émile Bernard included a detailed recipe for fritto-misto à l'italienne in their La Cuisine classique (1872), commenting, "The fritto-misto is a national delicacy of Italy; the Romans especially prepare it with the greatest care, because it is very important to them." Like many other chefs and food writers, they emphasise the importance of eating the dish as soon as it is cooked: "The essential point is that the fry is served very hot, because as it cools it softens and thus loses all its qualities." (Note: Le point essentiel es que la friture soit servie bien chaude, car en refroidissant elle se ramollit et perd par ce fait toutes ses qualités.) A New York article on "Christmas in Rome" at the end of the century referred to "fritto misto, a dish of brains, liver, potatoes and various vegetables, all fried that rich golden color which seems to be only obtainable in a foreign frying-pan".

The frugal Roman street version of fritto misto was often made of offal (brains, sweetbreads, liver) and vegetables, all battered and deep-fried. More upmarket fritto misto was, and is, found in Bologna, typically containing prime cuts such as strips of lamb and chicken along with the offal and vegetables. In coastal areas a fritto misto di pesce (lit. 'mixed fry of fish') is familiar. The main ingredients may include baby octopus, calamari rings, cod, sardines, shrimps and whitebait. Fritto misto di pesce, is often named after the area from which it comes, such as fritto misto ligure or fritto misto della laguna. Elsewhere in Italy fritto misto di verdure (with vegetables) is popular, and may include artichoke hearts and wild mushrooms. A sweet element may be introduced to the mixed savoury ingredients, such as amaretti di Saronno biscuits or deep-fried fruit.

== Regional variants ==
	English translation	Main ingredients	Ref
Fritto misto alla bolognese	Bologna-style	Strips of lamb cutlets and chicken, sweetbreads, mortadella, cubes of cheese, strips of artichokes, aubergines, cauliflower, courgettes and courgette flowers, fennel, mushrooms, potatoes and tomatoes, with some sweet ingredients including apple fritters	
Fritto misto alla emiliana	Emilia-style	Lamb testicles, brains, lamb chops or chicken breasts, liver, artichokes, Brussels sprouts, courgettes, cauliflower and tomatoes	
Fritto misto alla fiorentina	Florence-style	Brains, liver, kidneys, sweetbreads, testicles, veal, artichokes, cauliflower, courgettes, potato and mozzarella	
Fritto misto alla milanese	Milan-style	Veal escalopes, calf's liver, brains, cockscombs, cauliflower, artichokes and courgettes	
Fritto misto alla marchigiana	Marche-style	Stuffed olives, brains, artichoke hearts, courgettes and minced veal	
Fritto misto alla napoletana	Naples-style	Testicles, brains, potato, courgettes and courgette flowers, mozzarella and sliced boiled eggs	
Fritto misto alla piemontese	Piedmont-style	Calf's liver, kidneys, brains, sweetbreads, lamb chops, chicken breast, beef fillet, artichokes, aubergines, cardoon and apples	
Fritto misto alla romana	Rome-style	Lamb chops, testicles, brains, artichokes, cauliflower and courgettes	

Most of these dishes are served with the addition of a small variety of sweet ingredients, such as amaretti di Saronno biscuits or deep-fried fruit. A fritto misto di verdure, with no specific regional origin, may contain artichoke hearts, carrots, cauliflower, courgette flowers, mushrooms, peppers and potatoes.

== Notes, references and sources ==
=== Sources ===
- Bevan, Samuel (1849). Sand and canvas; A Narrative of Adventures in Egypt, with a Sojourn Among the Artists in Rome. London: C. Gilpin. OCLC 1141304675.
- Boni, Ada (1999). Il talismano della felicità (in Italian). Rome: Colombo. ISBN 8-88-635933-0.
- Carluccio, Antonio (1996). Antonio Carluccio's Italian Feast. London: BBC. ISBN 0-56-337169-2.
- Carluccio, Antonio (2005). Carluccio's Italian Food. London: Alhambra. ISBN 978-1-84-400297-9.
- David, Elizabeth (1987) [1954]. Italian Food. London: Penguin. ISBN 978-0-14-046841-0.
- Dubois, Urbain; Émile Bernard (1872). La cuisine classique: études pratiques, raisonnées et démonstratives de l'école française appliquée au service à la Russe (in French). Paris: Dentu. OCLC 17746404.
- Riley, Gillian (2009). The Oxford Companion to Italian Food. Oxford: Oxford University Press. ISBN 978-0-19-538710-0.
- Roden, Claudia (1989). The Food of Italy. London: Chatto & Windus. ISBN 0-70-113493-3.
- Wolfert, Paula (1977). Mediterranean Cooking. New York: Quadrangle. ISBN 0-81-290660-8.
