= Gâteau de plomb =

19th-century French pastry

Gâteau de plomb was a style of 19th-century shortcake pastry made with butter, eggs and cream, similar to biscuit.

== History ==
There are recipes for gâteau de plomb in Le Cuisinier Impérial and in Marie-Antoine Carême's Le Pâtissier royal parisien.

Carême's recipe is for a dough with a consistency "a little stiffer than the paste for the brioches" that is baked in six-inch (15 cm) copper or tin molds with fluted sides, similar in appearance to modern brioche molds. Carême's variations on the basic recipe are made with citron, aniseed, orange flower, lemon peel, raisins, vanilla, chestnuts, and even some versions made with cheeses like gruyere and brie. The "Anglo-Francais" version is made with citron, raisins and Jamaican rum.

In the Livre de Cuisine recipe by Jules Gouffé (translated into English by Alphonse Gouffe, head pastry chef to Queen Victoria) the pastry was prepared with similar ingredients and shaped into a two-inch (5.1 cm) thick round loaf. The edges were scored and a pattern cut on top and tied around the edge with buttered parchment to control spread in the oven. Small cakes made this way were a breakfast food.

== Preparation ==
Gâteau de plomb is made by rubbing butter into flour to obtain a crumbly mixture used to form a sweet paste with sugar, eggs and cream added. It can be scored and baked as one large roll, tied with parchment to retain its shape, or formed into small cakes.

== In popular culture ==
Frances Milton Trollope, in the 19th-century Victorian novel Second Love, Or, Beauty and Intellect, wrote:

"The three brothers were all military men. The eldest, as the declared heir of both father and mother, was a great gentleman, and favored, as is usual in such cases, with one of those easy and pleasant little staff appointments which may be considered as the sugarplums in that honorable gâteau de plomb, a soldier's life."
