= Émile Bernard (disambiguation) =

Émile Bernard (1868–1941) was a French painter. The name may also refer to:

- Émile Bernard (chef) (1826–1897), French chef
- Émile Bernard (composer) (1843–1902), French composer

== See also ==
- Émile Bénard (1844–1929), French architect and painter
