= Espagnole sauce =

Brown sauce in French cuisine

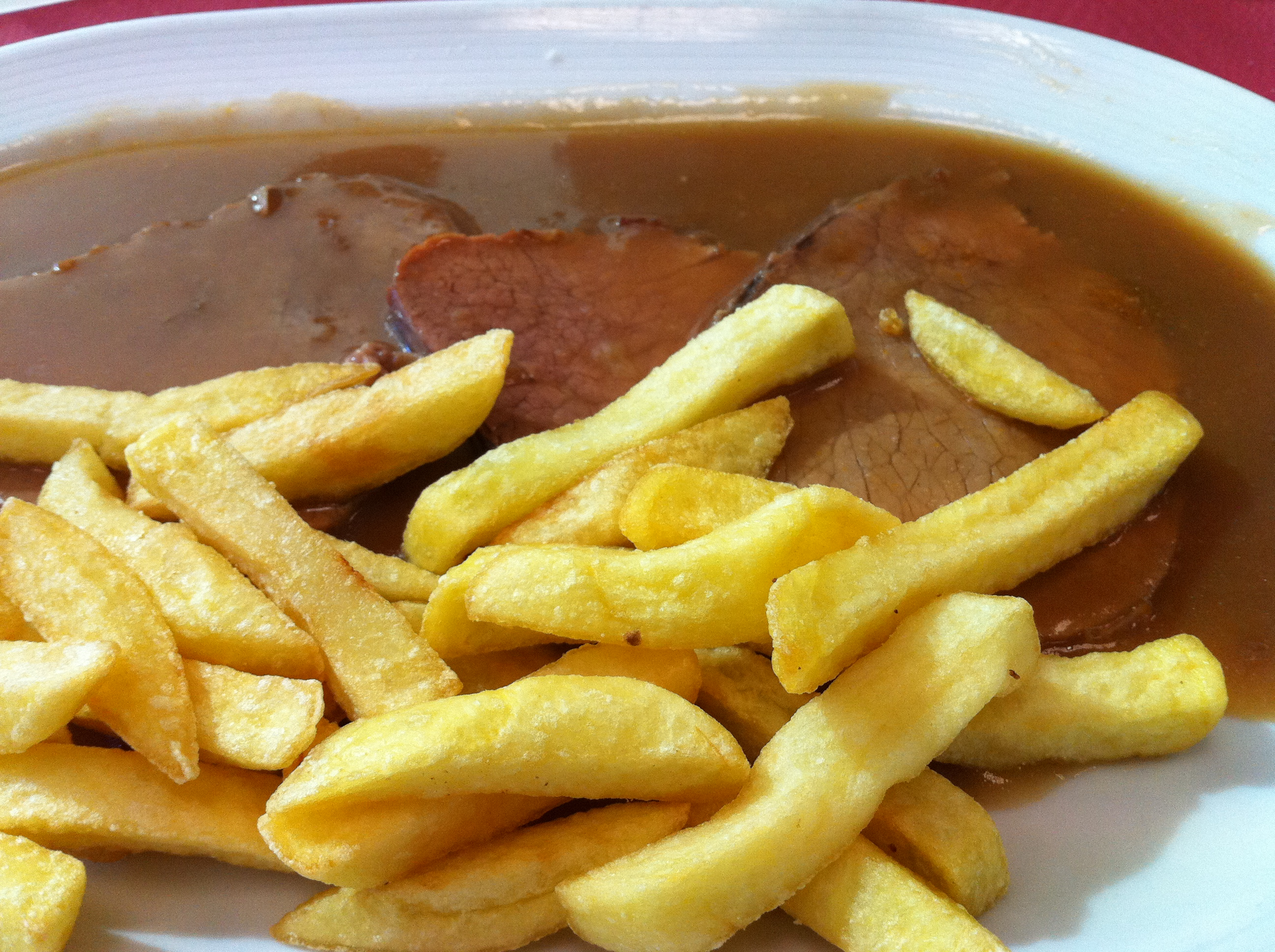
- Beef with espagnole sauce and French fries
- Type: Sauce
- Associated cuisine: French
- Main ingredients: Meat stock, brown roux

Espagnole sauce (French pronunciation: [ɛspaɲɔl]) is a basic brown sauce, and is one of the mother sauces of classic French cuisine. It is a strong-flavoured brown sauce, made from a dark brown roux and brown stock—usually beef or veal stock—and tomatoes or tomato paste.

In the early 19th century the chef Antonin Carême included it in his list of the basic sauces of French cooking. In the early 20th century Auguste Escoffier named it as one of the five sauces at the core of France's cuisine.

== Etymology ==
Espagnole is the French for "Spanish". Many French sauces have names of countries, such as hollandaise sauce or crème anglaise. Generally, the country's name is chosen as a tribute to a historical event or because the sauce's content evokes that country. In the case of Spanish sauce, it is thought that the name was given due to its red color, which is associated with Spain.

Subsequently, several attempts were created to explain its name. It is said, for example, that Anne of Austria – who, despite her name, was Spanish – introduced cooks from Spain to the kitchens of the French court and that her cooks improved the French brown sauce by adding tomatoes. A similar tale refers to the Spanish cooks employed by Louis XIV's wife, Maria Theresa of Spain. There is no record of Spanish cooks in the kitchens of the French court, therefore, these explanations appear to be baseless. Another suggestion is that in the 17th century, Spanish bacon and ham were introduced as the meat for the stock on which the sauce is based, rather than the traditional beef.

== History ==
A "Spanish Sauce" appears in Vincent La Chapelle's 1733 cookery book Le Cuisinier moderne as a sauce for pheasant. Marie-Antoine Carême printed a detailed recipe for "Sauce Espagnole" in his 1815 book Le Pâtissier royal parisien. By the middle of the 19th century, the sauce was familiar in the English-speaking world; in her Modern Cookery of 1845 Eliza Acton gave two recipes for it, one with added wine and one without. The sauce was included in Auguste Escoffier's 1903 classification of the five mother sauces, on which much French cooking depends.

== Ingredients ==
La Chapelle's recipe calls for onions, carrots, gravy, ham essence, lemon, garlic, basil, thyme, bay leaf, parsley, green onion, white wine, and, optionally, partridges. Liver is added at the end of cooking.

Carême's recipe runs to more than 400 words. He calls for ham, veal, and partridges gently braised in water for two hours, after which roux is mixed in and the pan is returned to the stove for a further two hours or more. It is garnished with "parsley, chives, bay leaves, thyme, sweet basil, cloves, and parings of mushrooms".

Auguste Escoffier's recipe for espagnole, dating from 1903, is briefer, and it includes tomatoes, unlike older recipes. It calls for brown stock (made from veal, beef, and ham), brown roux, tomatoes, and mirepoix (diced onion, carrot, celery, and ham or lightly salted pork belly), simmered for up to eight hours.

== Derivatives ==
Sauce espagnole is the basis for many French sauces. They include:

Sauce	Ingredients	Ref
africaine	Cayenne pepper, madeira, onion rings, diced truffles	
bigarade	juice and zest of orange and lemon; duck stock, sugar	
bordelaise	thyme, mignonette pepper, bay leaves, red wine	
bourguignonne	shallots, parsley, thyme, bay, mushroom trimmings, butter and red wine	
aux champignons	mushroom stock and small mushroom caps	
charcutière	onions, white wine, vinegar, pepper, mustard, gherkins	
chasseur	sliced mushrooms, chopped sautéed shallots, white wine, butter, parsley	
chevreuil	mirepoix of vegetables, game trimmings, red wine, pepper sauce, Cayenne pepper	
à la diable anglaise	shallots, white pepper, vinegar, tomato purée	
financière	madeira, truffle essence	
aux pignoles à l'italienne	pine kernels (pignoles), sugar, vinegar, nutmeg, pepper, red wine	
Robert	onions, white wine, vinegar, pepper, mustard	
Saint-Malo	white wine, shallots, mustard, anchovy paste	
venaison	game essence, pepper sauce, redcurrant jelly, sugar	

== See also ==
- Demi-glace

== Sources ==
- Acton, Eliza (1845). Modern Cookery. London: Longman, Brown, Green. OCLC 776237549.
- Beck, Simone; Bertholle, Louisette; Child, Julia (2012) [1961]. Mastering the Art of French Cooking, Volume One. London: Particular. ISBN 978-0-241-95339-6.
- Bickel, Walter (1989). Hering's Dictionary of Classical and Modern Cookery (eleventh ed.). London: Virtue. ISBN 978-3-8057-0307-9.
- Carême, Marie-Antoine (1815). Le Pâtissier royal parisien. Vol. 1. Paris: J. G. Dentu.
- Carême, Marie-Antoine (1834). The Royal Parisian Pastrycook and Confectioner. London: F. J. Mason. OCLC 15160719.
- Ceserani, Victor; Ronald Kinton (1974). Practical Cookery (fourth ed.). London: Edward Arnold. ISBN 978-0-7131-1853-7.
- Dallas, E. S. (1877). Kettner's Book of the Table. London: Dulau. OCLC 771590401.
- Davidson, Alan (1999). "Sauce espagnole". In Davidson, Alan (ed.). The Oxford Companion to Food. Oxford: Oxford University Press. ISBN 978-0-19-211579-9.
- Diat, Louis (1979). Gourmet's Basic French Cookbook. New York: Gourmet Books. OCLC 1107861618.
- Escoffier, Auguste; Gilbert, Philéas (1903). Le guide culinaire, aide-mémoire de cuisine pratique. Paris: Emile Colin.
- Escoffier, Auguste (1907). A Guide to Modern Cookery. London: William Heinemann Ltd.
- La Chapelle, Vincent (1733). The Modern Cook. London: Nicolas Prevost. OCLC 1328833700.
- Montagné, Prosper (1976). Larousse Gastronomique. London: Hamlyn. ISBN 978-0-600-02352-4. OCLC 1285641881.
- Saulnier, Louis (1978). Le Répertoire de la Cuisine (fourteenth ed.). London: Jaeggi. OCLC 1086737491.
