= Trets =

Commune in Provence-Alpes-Côte d'Azur, France

- Commune
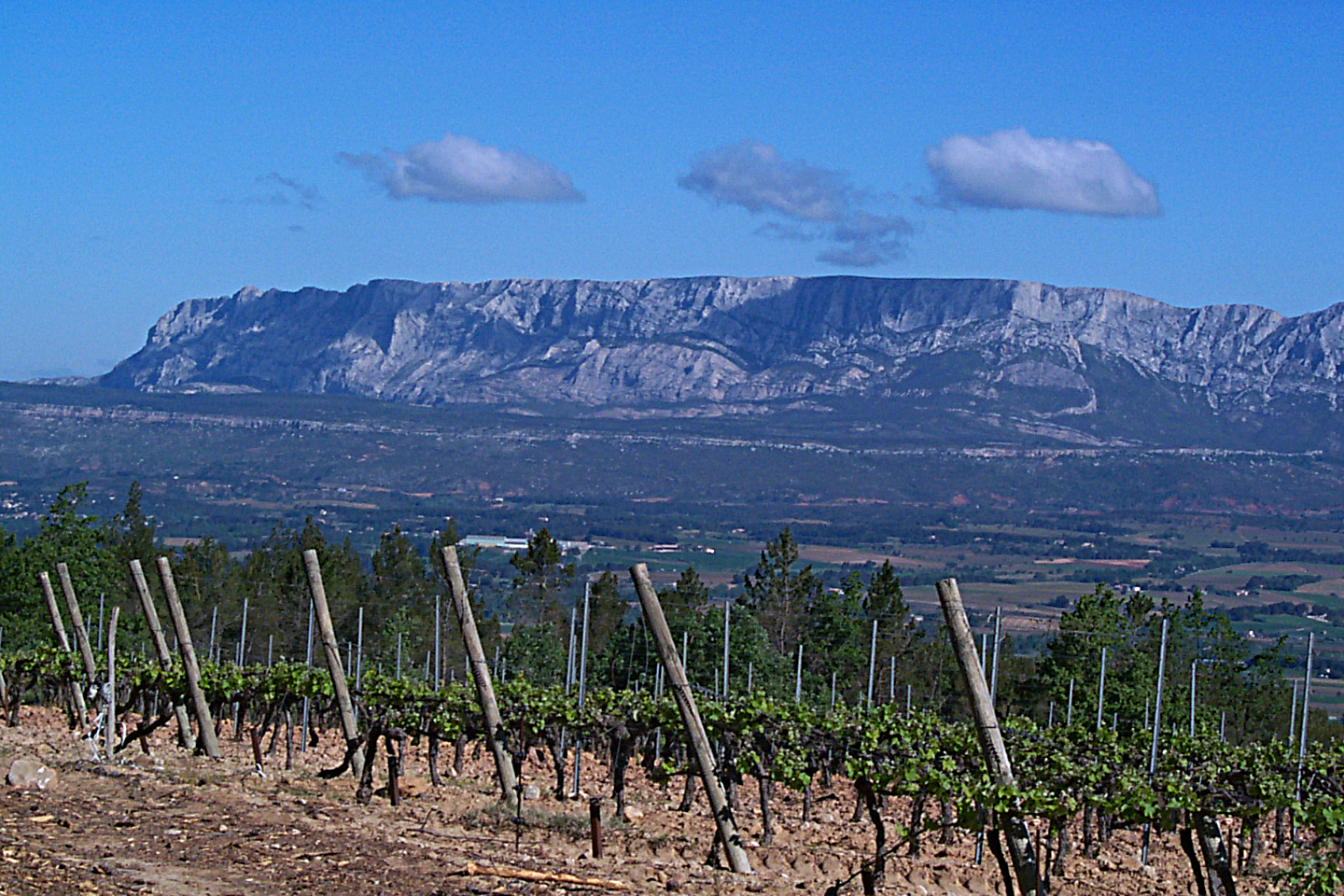
- Montagne Sainte-Victoire and vineyards, seen from the slope south of Trets

- Coat of arms
- Location of Trets
- Location within France Location within Provence-Alpes-Côte d'Azur
- Coordinates: 43°26′51″N 5°41′01″E
- Country: France
- Region: Provence-Alpes-Côte d'Azur
- Department: Bouches-du-Rhône
- Arrondissement: Aix-en-Provence
- Canton: Trets
- Intercommunality: Aix-Marseille-Provence

Government
  - Mayor (2026–32): Pascal Chauvin
- Area^{1}: 70.31 km^{2} (27.15 sq mi)
- Elevation: 249 m (817 ft)
- Highest elevation: 810 m (2,660 ft)
- Lowest elevation: 217 m (712 ft)
- Population (2023): 10,946
  - Density: 155.7/km^{2} (403.2/sq mi)
- Time zone: UTC+01:00 (CET)
  - Summer (DST): UTC+02:00 (CEST)
- INSEE/Postal code: 13110 /13530
- ^{1} French Land Register data, which excludes lakes, ponds, glaciers > 1 km^{2} (0.386 sq mi or 247 acres) and river estuaries.

Trets (English: /trɛts/; French pronunciation: [tʁɛ(t)s]; Provençal: Tretz) is a commune (town or township, in English) in the Bouches-du-Rhône department of the Provence-Alpes-Côtes d’Azur region in the southeast of France. With a population of over 10,000, it is one of 44 communes in the Aix-en-Provence arrondissement or district. It is often described as a medieval town because of its development during the Middle Ages of European history and retention of medieval architecture.

== Geography ==
Trets is situated in the Upper Valley of the Arc river, between painter Paul Cézanne's beloved Montagne Sainte-Victoire 11 km to the north and the Aurélien hills (Monts Auréliens) to the east, at the foot of Mount Olympus to the south.

== Population and history ==
Historical population

Year	Pop.	±% p.a.
1793	2,650	—
1800	2,717	+0.36%
1806	2,483	−1.49%
1821	2,634	+0.39%
1831	3,014	+1.36%
1836	3,010	−0.03%
1841	3,039	+0.19%
1846	3,028	−0.07%
1851	2,656	−2.59%
1856	2,890	+1.70%
1861	2,910	+0.14%
1866	2,859	−0.35%
1872	2,794	−0.38%
1876	3,285	+4.13%
1881	2,986	−1.89%
1886	2,821	−1.13%
1891	2,595	−1.66%
1896	2,518	−0.60%
1901	2,722	+1.57%

Year	Pop.	±% p.a.
1906	2,710	−0.09%
1911	2,659	−0.38%
1921	2,712	+0.20%
1926	2,965	+1.80%
1931	2,903	−0.42%
1936	2,624	−2.00%
1946	2,553	−0.27%
1954	2,640	+0.42%
1962	2,957	+1.43%
1968	3,250	+1.59%
1975	3,674	+1.77%
1982	4,735	+3.69%
1990	7,900	+6.61%
1999	9,314	+1.85%
2007	10,136	+1.06%
2012	10,383	+0.48%
2017	10,613	+0.44%
2023	10,946	+0.52%

Source: EHESS and INSEE (1968-2023)

Archeological evidence suggests that the first inhabitants of the area, of Chasséen culture, lived on the summit of Mount Olympus around 4000 BC, during the Neolithic period.

The founding site of Trets has been described variously as a Greek colony or an "ancient Roman settlement". By some accounts Trets was originally named Trittia or Tritea by the Phocean settlers of Massalia, in homage to the daughter of the Greek god Triton.

In the later years of the Roman conquest of Provence, Gaius Marius defeated the Teutons and Ambrones "at a spot between Saint-Maximin and Trets".

The first historical account identifying the populace now known as Trets appears in 950 AD, when the king of Burgundy and Provence Conrad the Peaceful transferred hereditary rule over the lands of the Upper Valley of the Arc as a fisc to the first Seigneur (or Lord) of Trets. A succession of lords ruled until the French Revolution of 1789.

== Architecture ==
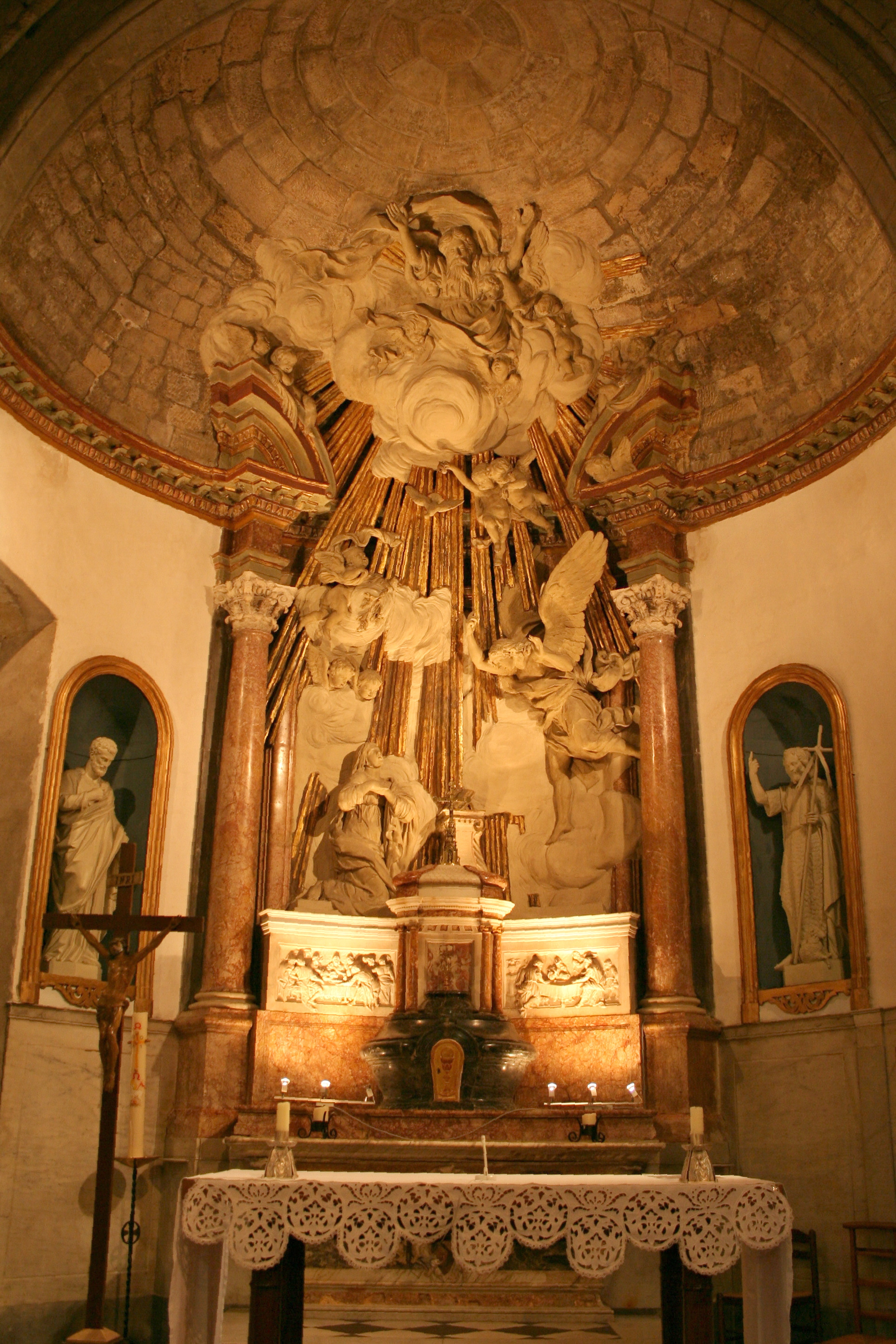
Altar of the Church of Our Lady of Nazareth.

Romanesque, and gothic buildings and vaulted passageways of the medieval period line the narrow, winding streets of the town. The center of Trets was surrounded the ramparts and its 8 towers (4 left), for defense against successive invasions over the centuries. A 2200 sqm garden along the town walls (Jardins des Remparts) was opened in 2011.

Several gates (porte) were opened in the city walls. The rectangular Gate of Pourrières and its preserved machicolations were built in the 14th century. It served as the main gateway access into town. On the East side of city, the Gate Saint-Jean also known as the Gate of Amont (14th) provides uptown access and was used to store munitions. On the North end stood the Gate of Clastre (14th), the Porte Neuve and the Gate of Puyloubier, all destroyed by the mid-19th century.

Now the grounds of the Edmond Brun elementary school, a hospital named Hôpital Saint Jacques was established circa 1300 near the church of the same patronage and later transferred, in 1794, to the Observantins convent.

The low, vaulted passageway called Le Trou de Madame Lion gave access to the wall-walk. It is thought to have been either a way of confining any epidemic outbreak to the grounds of the hospital or a way of defending against mounted attacks.

To the southeast is the feudal castle (Château des Remparts) with its staircase in dimension stone with a ramp from the 17th century, French-style painted ceilings and a baroque chimney. Its construction started in the late 12th or the early 13th century. In June 2013 a number of renovations were completed, with a modern performance space in the courtyard.

The classified 14th-century Church of Our Lady of Nazareth was built upon a 4th-century priory of the Roman-Provençal style with an open vaulted arch, gothic chapels, and a massive unfinished tower. Its massive altarpiece (1693) was executed by the native Christophe Veyrier in stucco and marble.

La Chapelle Saint-Jean-du-Puy, a former 5th-century hermitage, features a Romanesque apse, garden sanctuary and 18th-century watch tower that is an observatory overlooking the town and the Valley of the Arc. It was rebuilt with the addition of two Gallo-Roman columns.

The 14th-century papal Studium of Trets put forth what may have been the only record of its kind in the Vatican archives of that time, a register of the local economy detailing the material life of schoolchildren and their teachers.

The Hôtel de la Vallée de l’Arc, at the center of town, was an 18th-century relay post.

Henri Raybaud executed the War memorial on the townhall square depicting an "angel of victory" .

== Cultural encounters and traditions ==
The influence of both Greek and Roman cultures is said to have led to the cultivation of wine and wheat. After the Romans came the Goths, the Merovingians, the Carlovingians and the Saracens; then, after a period of viscounts of Marseille, Trets came under local papal governance through the diocese of Aix, according to the papal bull of Urban II in 1088.

Holidays and festivals reflect historical encounters and traditions, including:

- (May/June) La Fête de Saint Jean has been observed since 1793.
- (July) La Fête de la Saint Eloi, patron saint of goldsmiths and blacksmiths since 659 AD, celebrates Provençal culture, language and arts.
- (August) Les Médiévales de Trets celebrate the occasion of The Good King René welcoming his nephew Louis XI of France, with period events and dress.

While the Jews were expelled from France in 1182, local governance permitted construction of a synagogue in a manor on the present-day street called Rue Paul Bert. A surrounding Jewish quarter was established by local edict in the early 14th century.

In 2000, sister city exchanges were established with Aghavnadzor, Armenia.

=== Notable people ===
- Raimbaud de Reillanne, archbishop of Arles.
- Raymond de Gaufredi, son of the lord Burgondion de Trets and Mabile d'Agoult, minister general of the Order of Friars Minor from 1289 to 1295.
- Bertrand Bezaudun, archbishop of Genova from 1349 to 1358.
- Christophe Veyrier, born in Trets on 26 January 1637, died in Toulon on 10 June 1689 (sculptor), nephew and follower of Pierre Puget.
- Jean-Jacques Clérion, born in Trets on 16 April 1637, died in Paris on 28 August 1714 (sculptor for Louis XIV of France).
- Urbain Dubois, born in Trets on 26 May 1818, died in Nice on 14 March 1901, chef to the King of Prussia from 1860 to 1870. He published several recipe books and is credited with the invention of the Veal Orloff.

== See also ==
- Communes of the Bouches-du-Rhône department
