= Victorian cuisine =

Cuisine during the Victorian era of Britain

Victorian cuisine is the cuisine that was widespread in Britain during the Victorian era (20 June 1837 until her death on 22 January 1901).

== Background ==
There were two seemingly incompatible ideas about the role of women in Victorian society: the "New Women" who clamored for greater participation in public life seemed at odds with the traditional ideal of femininity, the "Angel of the House", that limited women's role in society to matters concerning the household. Despite the restrictiveness of traditional conceptions of femininity, not all women welcomed the "New Women" philosophies, some seeing the pursuit of political causes as vulgar, and preferring instead to pave other paths for women to seek their own agency. Guiding women writers like Elizabeth Robins Pennell held a belief that women ought not to abandon their traditional role in the kitchen, which society should regard, not as a mere frivolity, but as an inherently valuable pursuit worthy of respect.

Pennell strove to recast the cult of domestic femininity, duly elevating cooking from the drudgery of bodily labor by encouraging women to become creative in the kitchen. She saw cooking as "the ultimate form of art,” worthy of genius, admiration and respect. With the new, positive view that “cooking was a high art practised by geniuses", middle and upper class Victorian women in began to express their culinary creativity for the first time, much as male artists had always been able to do.

== Dining at home ==
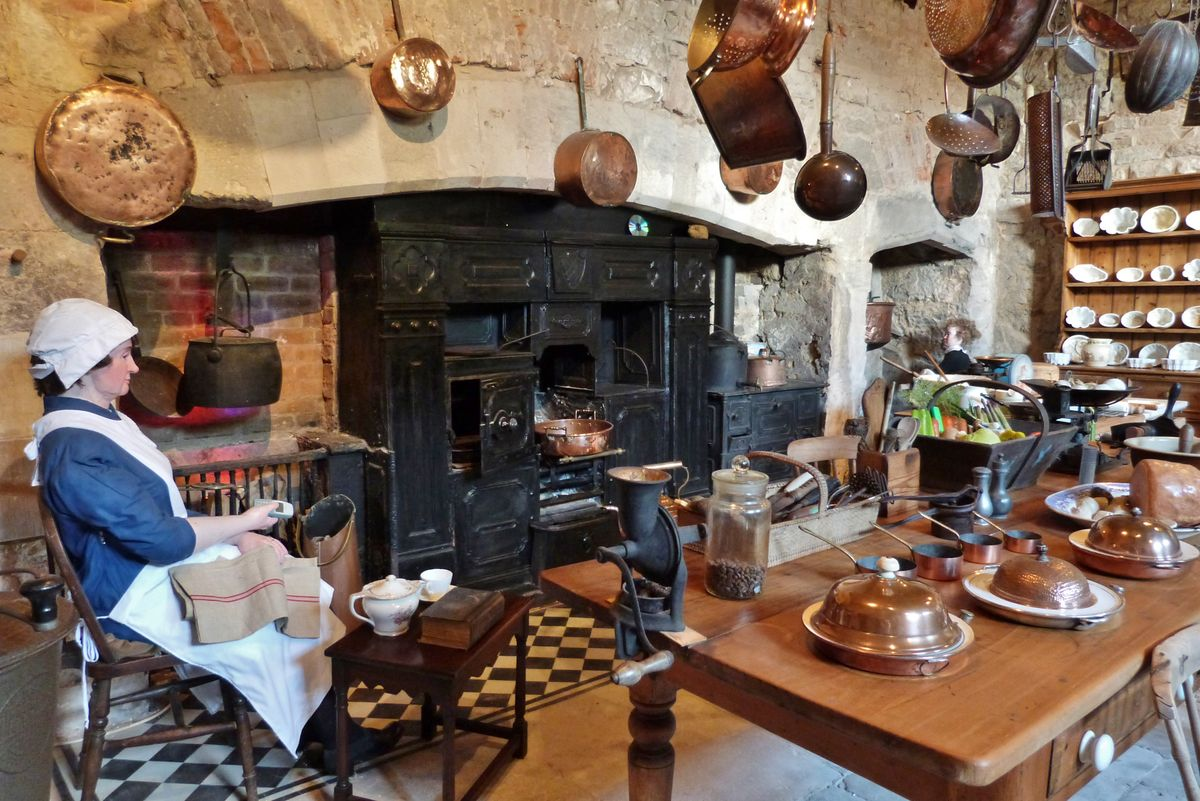
Victorian kitchen display at Lulworth Castle

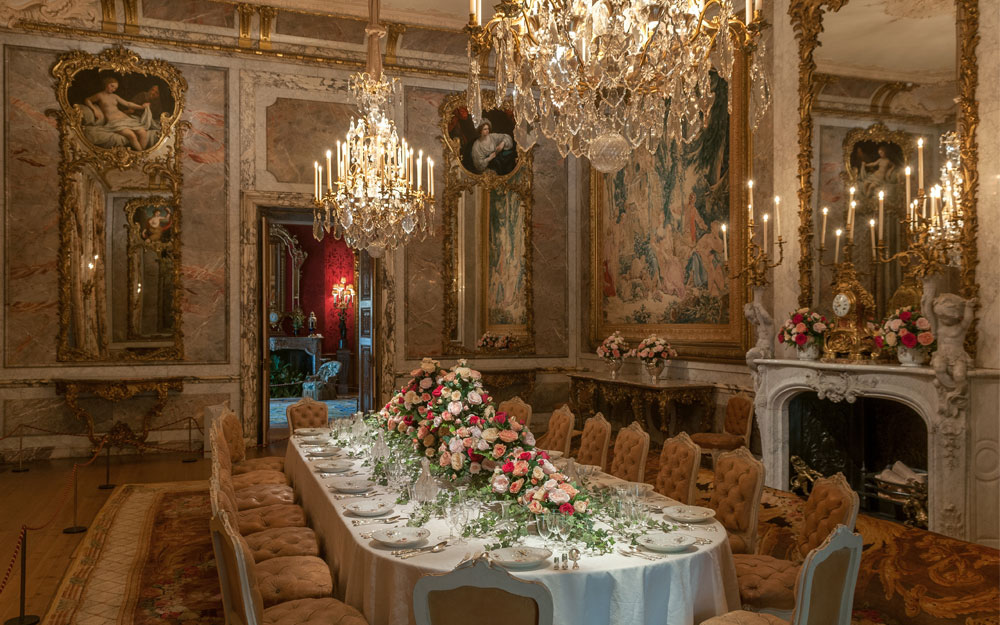
Victorian Dining Room, Waddesdon Manor

Many Victorian meals were served at home as a family, prepared by cooks and servants who had studied French and Italian cookbooks. Middle and upper class breakfasts typically consisted of porridge, eggs, fish and bacon. They were eaten together as a family. Sunday lunches included meat, potatoes, vegetables and gravy.

In wealthy British homes, the dining customs dictated proper attire that got fancier as the day progressed with separate outfits for breakfast and lunch, then a tea gown, with the most splendid attire reserved for dinner. Family meals became common events that linked the comforts of home with this newly recognized art form. Victorian cuisine did not appeal to everyone. British cooks like Mrs. A. B. Marshall encouraged boiling and mutating food until it no longer tasted or resembled its original form. Victorian England became known throughout Europe for its bland and unappetizing food but many housewives cooked in this fashion since it was the safest way to prepare food before refrigeration.

The Victorian breakfast was usually a heavy meal: sausages, preserves, bacon and eggs, served with bread rolls. The custom of afternoon tea served before dinner, with milk and sugar, became well-established in Britain in the early 19th century. A selection of tea sandwiches and biscuits, petit fours, nuts and glazed fruits would be served on the most beautiful china with the tea, and sometimes alcohol.

Dining became an elaborate event that took planning and skill. Hosting elaborate dinner parties was a new way to elevate social class in Victorian England. Instead of cooks and servants, middle and upper-class women began to make complicated dishes themselves to impress family members and guests. This ultimately transformed the once mundane tasks of cooking and eating into artful experiences.

Dinner was the most elaborate meal with multiple courses: soup, roast meats or fish, vegetables, puddings and sweets. Cheese was served at the end of the meal, after dessert. Tea and biscuits were usually offered to guests after the meal. A bill of fare and a guideline to plan menus became popular. A three course meal, for example, might begin with soups with fish, followed by meats, roasts or stews, then game and pastry, and ending with salads, cheese and liquor. Setting the table was an important part of the dining aesthetic, involving expensive silverware and china, with table decorations of “glass, linen, fruits, foliage, flowers, colours, [and] lights".

== Royal household ==
The Parisian Alphonse Gouffe (b. 1813 - d. 1907) became Head Pastry Chef to Queen Victoria. His brother Jules Gouffé wrote the Livre de Cuisine which Alphonse translated into English. According to census records, Gouffe was a married pastry cook living at Buckingham Palace in 1851. 1861 census records show Alphonse as a "cook of the kitchen" at Osborne Palace on the Isle of Wight. In 1871 Alphonse is 57 years old, a pastry cook at Windsor Castle.

== Holidays ==
The custom of Victorian England was to eat pancakes and fritters on Shrove Tuesday in preparation for Lent. (In Norwich small scallop-shaped buns substituted for pancakes.) The traditional bread for Good Friday was hot cross buns. In Penzance people would gather at the local pubs for May Eye playing music and drinking. Later in the evening they would gather at farmhouses to eat fruit cake and drink junket—a mixture of raw milk, rennet and sugar. Soul cakes were made around Halloween, coinciding with the end of the wheat-seeding season. In Scotland and parts of North England black pudding and sausages were prepared for Martinmas Day. Yorkshire Christmas pie was considered a classic Christmas dish by Charles Elmé Francatelli.

== In literature ==
The foodways of different social classes in Victorian England feature in literary works by Charles Dickens and Anthony Trollope. In Great Expectations, Dickens recounts the custom of the wedding breakfast. (Because all weddings in England were, until the 1880s, legally required to be held in the mornings, such "wedding breakfasts" became customary.)

== See also ==
- The Victorian Kitchen Garden
- Vegetarianism in the Victorian era
