= Sauce africaine =

French brown sauce with vegetables and herbs

Sauce africaine [sos afʁiˈkɛn] is a brown sauce, flavoured with tomatoes, onions, peppers and herbs. It is derived from espagnole sauce [ɛspaˈɲɔl] (basic brown sauce), one of the five "mother sauces" of French cooking. This hearty sauce complements steak, chops, and chicken.

Though not as quickly prepared as some other sauces, its basic method is the same as most other derivatives of espagnole sauce. The tomatoes, onion and bell pepper are cooked with herbs such as basil, thyme and bay leaf, reduced in wine, then combined with the espagnole sauce.

== See also ==
- List of sauces
