= Christophe Veyrier =

French sculptor

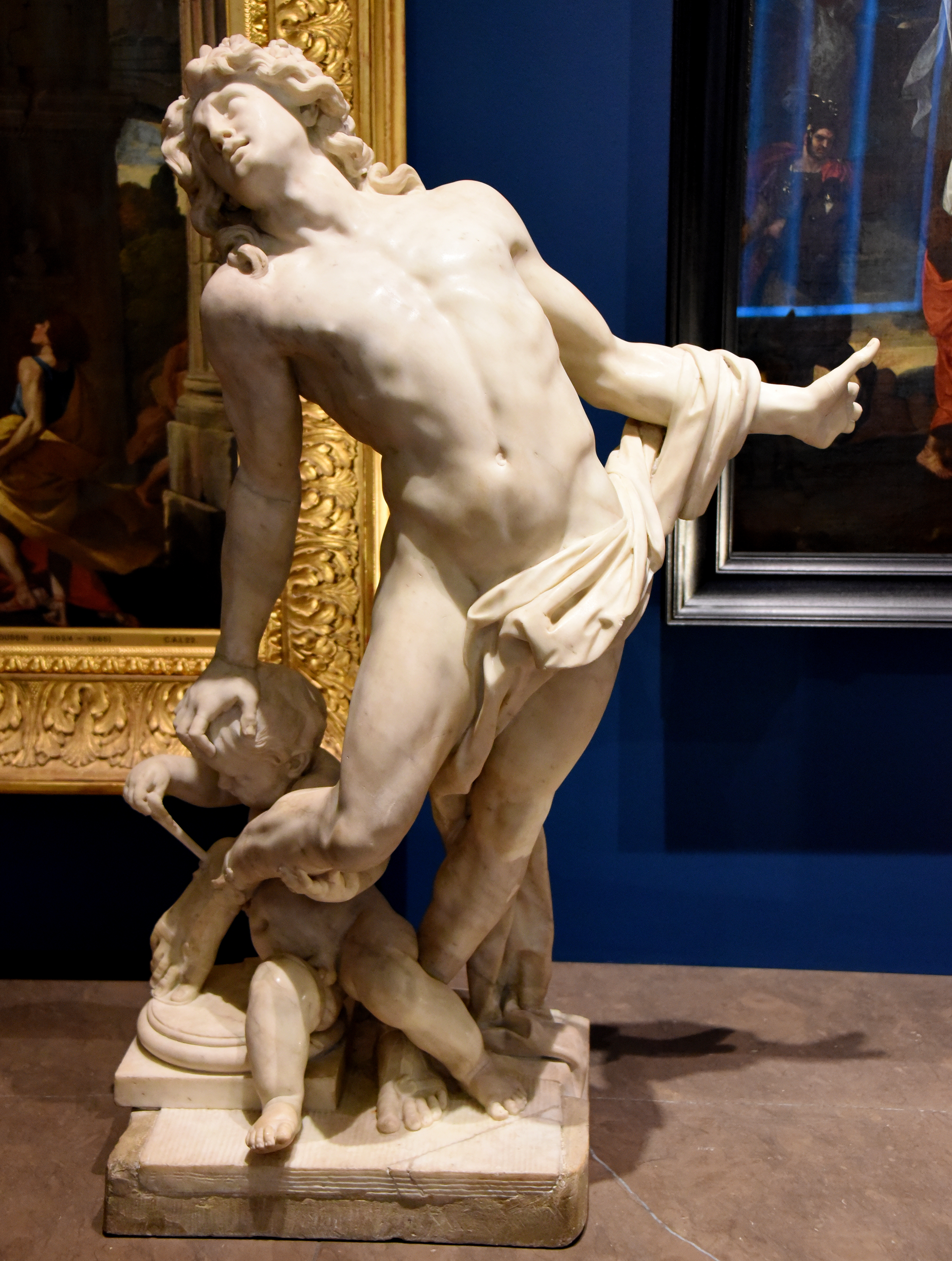
The Dying Achilles Statue. By Christophe Veyrier. Marble, circa 1683 CE. From Toulon, France. The Victoria and Albert Museum, London

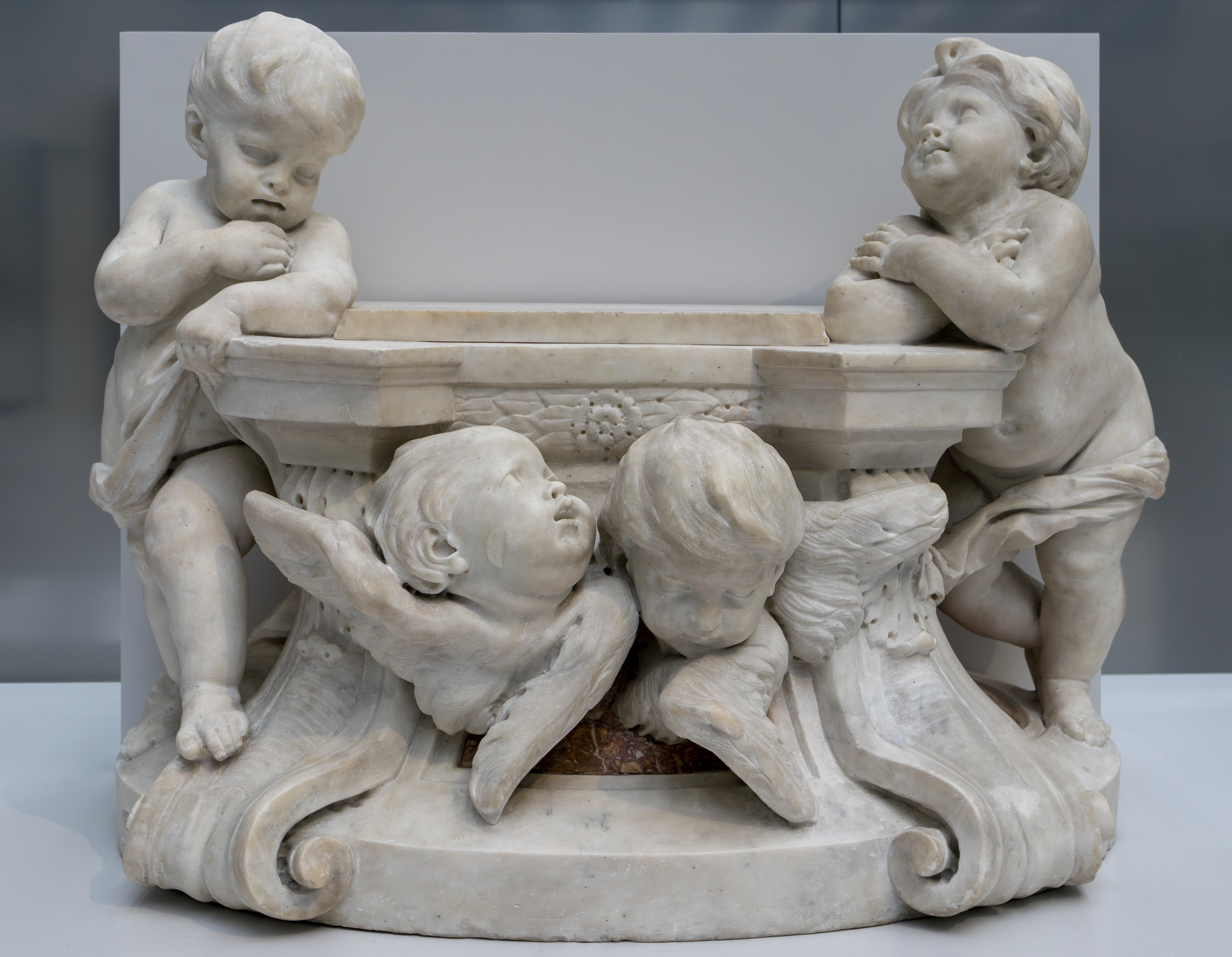
Two small angels and two cherub heads, Louvre Museum

Christophe Veyrier (25 June 1637 – 10 June 1689) was a French sculptor, the nephew and follower of Pierre Puget.

Veyrier was born in Trets, Provence, France. He arrived in Genoa in 1663 and stayed for a number of years, before moving to Rome to live from 1668-70. In 1674 he married the daughter of the sister of Puget's wife.

He worked in Aix-en-Provence, then settled in Toulon, where he lived until his death in 1689. In one of his most important commissions, he created religious statues for the Chapel of Corpus Domini in Toulon Cathedral. He also worked at Montpellier. Statues of ancient and mythological subjects are attributed to him, including the white marble relief of the family of Darius displayed at Stowe House in England. The most recent studies attribute to him the statue of the Immaculate Conception in Tivoli Cathedral (according to older literature the statue was formerly attributed to Puget himself).

His sculptures are held by the Musée d'Art, Toulon; the Musée Granet, Aix-en-Provence; the Musée du Louvre, Paris; the Victoria and Albert Museum, London; and the Metropolitan Museum of Art, New York.
