= Sauce bourguignonne =

French red wine sauce

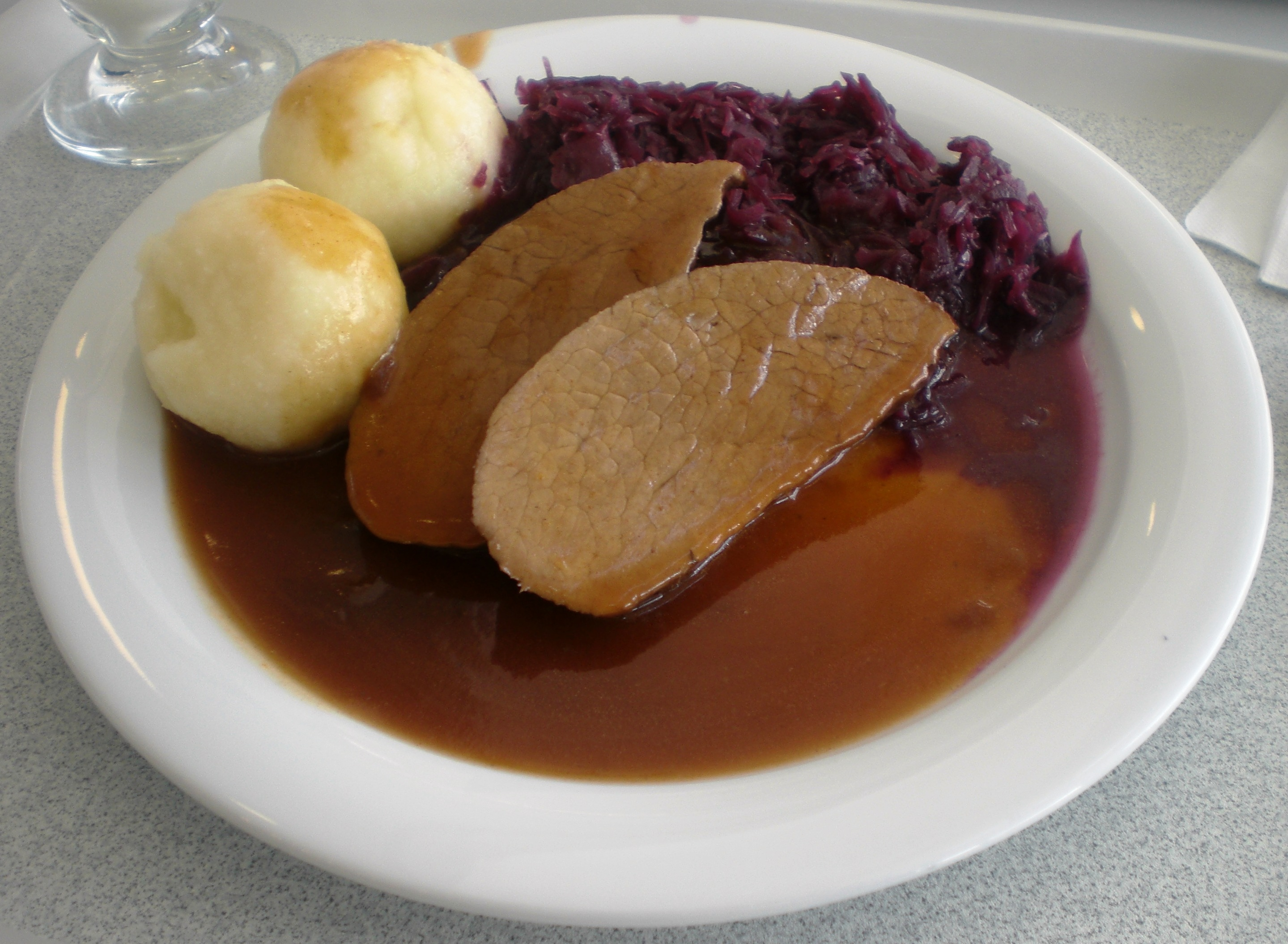
Roast beef in sauce bourguignonne, served with potatoes and red cabbage

Sauce bourguignonne (French pronunciation: [sos buʁɡiɲɔn]; lit. 'Burgundy sauce') is a French sauce with a base of red wine with onions or shallots, a bouquet garni (parsley, thyme and bay leaf), reduced, strained, and mixed with some espagnole sauce. Just before serving it is mounted with butter and seasoned lightly with cayenne pepper. Like all red wine sauces, it may have some mushrooms added during cooking to enrich the flavour.

When the sauce is used to accompany sautéed meat or poultry, it is made directly in the sauté pan in which these items were cooked. The onions or shallots are sautéed in the pan and the red wine is added which is used to dissolve and incorporate the residue from the cooking of the meat. The onions may also be cooked at the same time as the meat.

== See also ==
- List of sauces
