= Bordelaise sauce =

French wine sauce

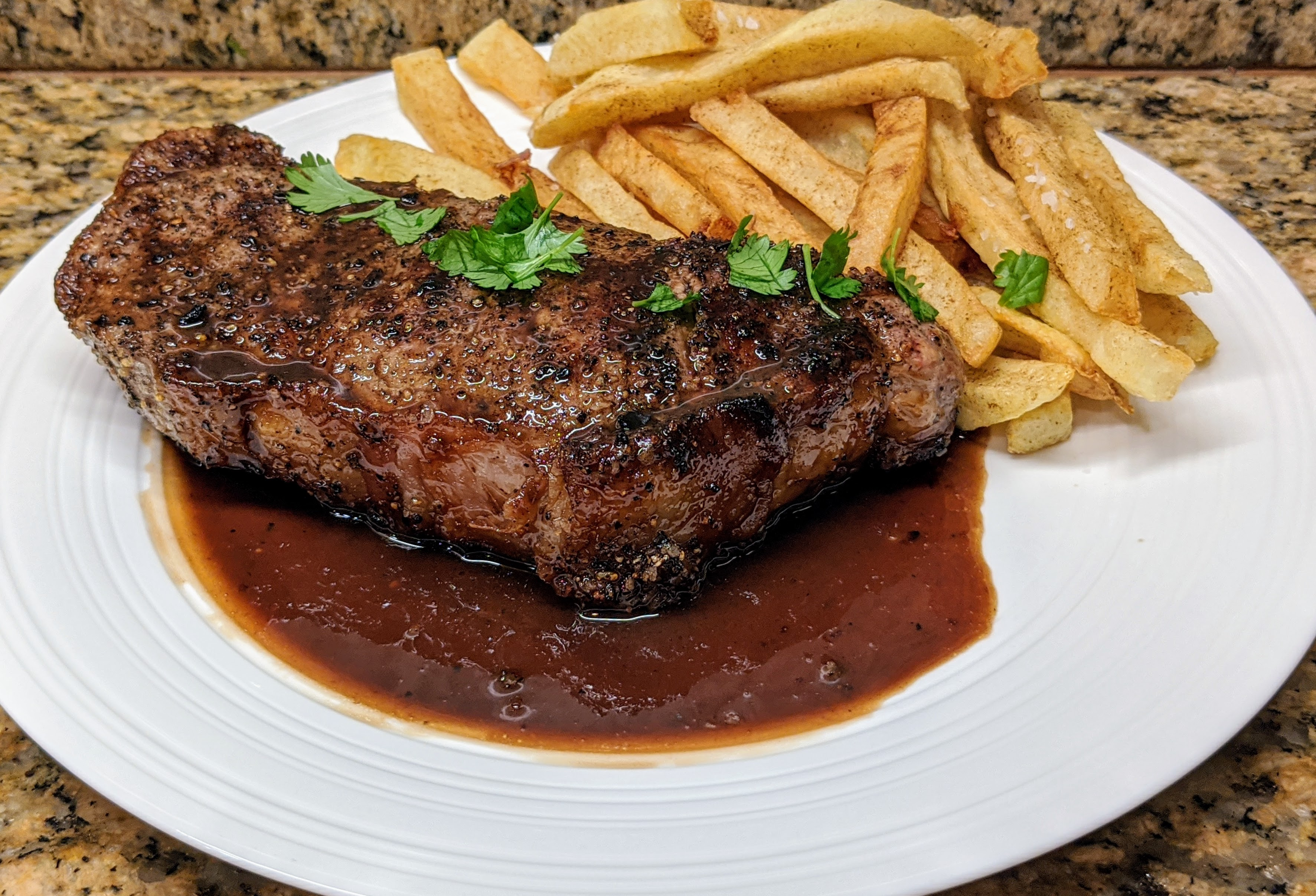
- Steak frites with bordelaise sauce
- Type: Sauce
- Place of origin: France
- Serving temperature: Hot
- Main ingredients: Dry red wine, bone marrow, butter, shallots and sauce demiglace
- Variations: New Orleans bordelaise

Bordelaise sauce (French pronunciation: [bɔʁdəlɛz]) is a classic French sauce named after the Bordeaux region of France, which is famous for its wine. According to Auguste Escoffier in his book Ma cuisine, sauce bordelaise is made using white wine. In the same book, Escoffier also refers to the original sauce as sauce Bordelaise Bonnefoy.

Nowadays bordelaise is made using red wine, bone marrow, butter, shallots and sauce demi-glace. Sauce marchand de vin ('wine-merchant's sauce') is a similar designation. Traditionally, bordelaise sauce is served with grilled beef or steak, though it can also be served with other meats that pair well with red wine demi-glace–based sauces.

== New Orleans bordelaise ==
A bordelaise sauce in traditional New Orleans-style Louisiana Creole cuisine is different from the French classical version, although both are available in the city. The basic flavor is garlic rather than red wine and bone marrow. Another sauce called "bordelaise" in New Orleans consists of butter, olive oil, shallots, parsley and garlic.

This combination is the foundation of the classic escargots bordelaises, a dish that was available in New Orleans restaurants early in the twentieth century. The association of bordelaise with garlic may have begun with this dish and then shifted to the demi-glace version. A 1904 Creole recipe calls for garlic and parsley in addition to green onions, red wine, beef marrow and "Spanish sauce."
