= Veal Orloff =

French dish named for Russian diplomat

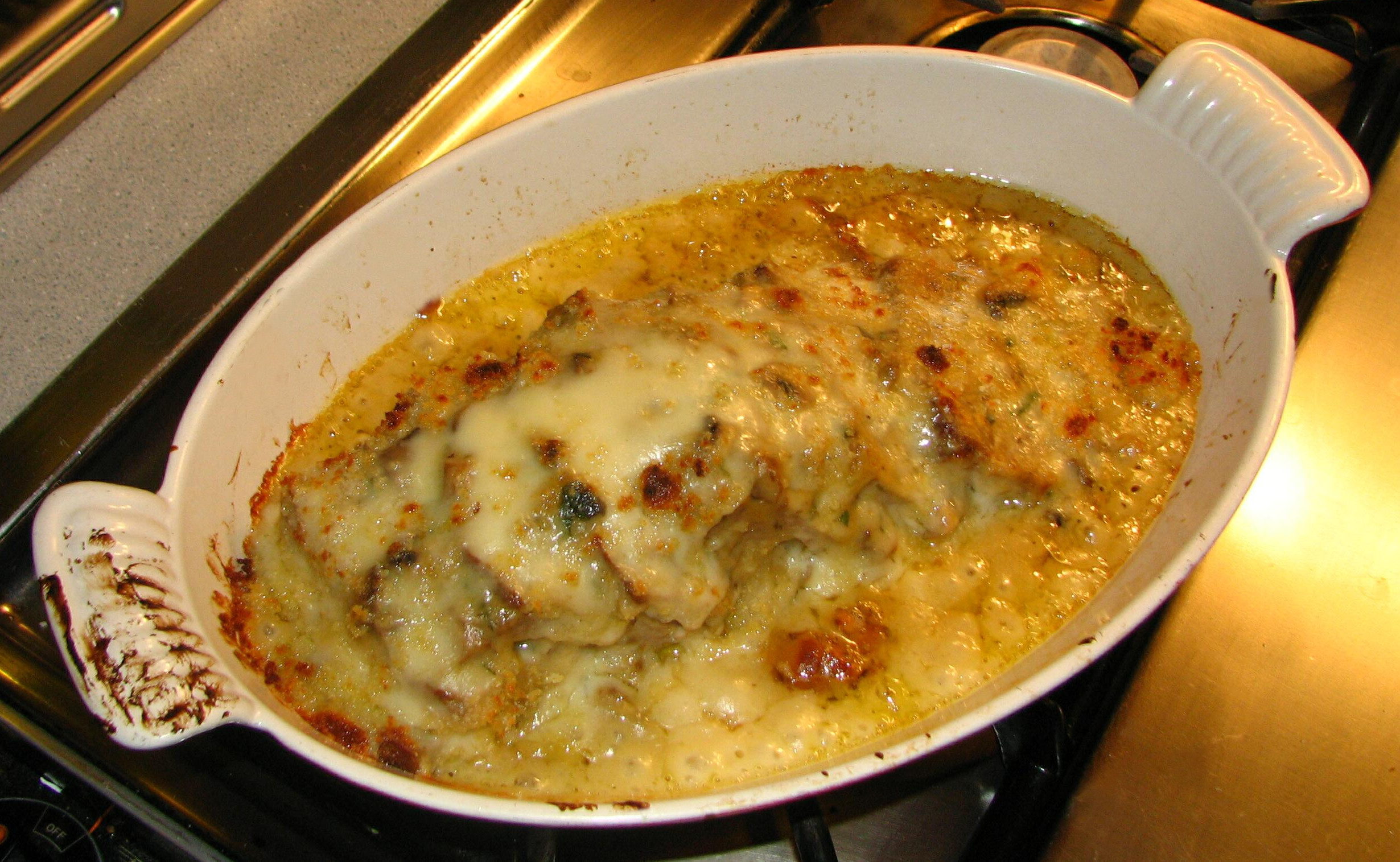
- Alternative names: Veal Orlov, Veal Prince Orloff, Veal Prince Orlov, French-style meat
- Course: Main course
- Place of origin: France
- Created by: Urbain Dubois
- Serving temperature: Hot
- Main ingredients: veal, mushroom, onion, Mornay sauce

Veal Orloff, or veal Orlov (French: veau Orloff or veau Orlov), is a dish created by Urbain Dubois, a 19th-century French chef employed by Prince Orloff, the Russian ambassador to France. The dish consists of thinly sliced braised loin of veal, with duxelles and soubise layered between the slices, topped with Mornay sauce, and browned in the oven.

Similar dishes are popular in Russia today, where they usually go by the name French-style meat (Russian: мясо по-французски, romanized: myáso po-frantsúski). Such varieties often replace veal with cheaper meats, such as beef or pork, have sliced potato added to simpler preparations of mushroom (in lieu of duxelles) and onion (in lieu of soubise), or replace the Mornay sauce with mayonnaise.

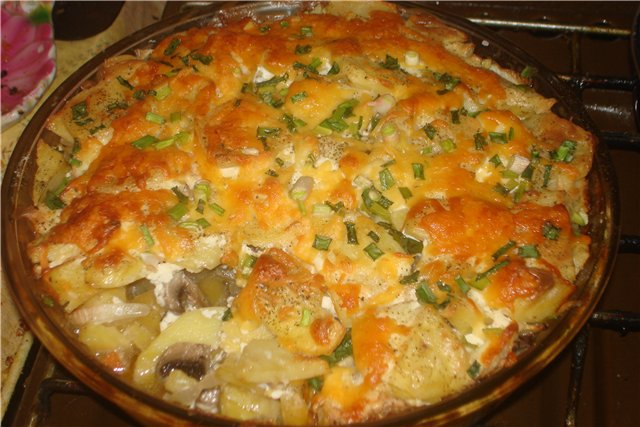
Modern Russian "French-style meat"

== See also ==
- List of casserole dishes
- List of mushroom dishes
- List of Russian dishes
- List of veal dishes
