= Émile Bernard (composer) =

French composer and organist

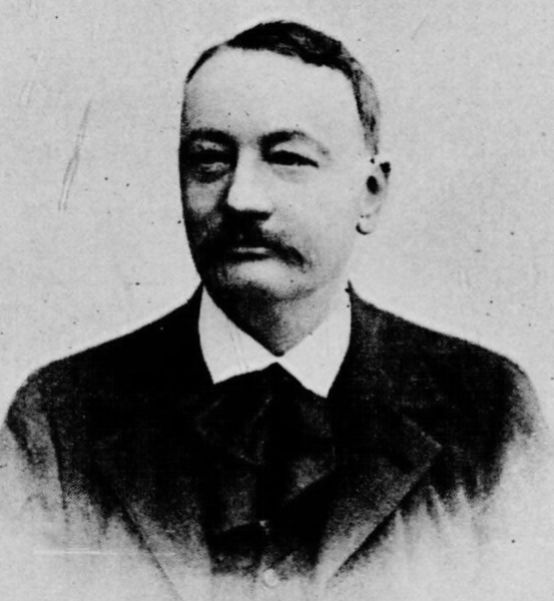
Émile Bernard (1898)

Jean Émile Auguste Bernard (28 November 1843 – 11 September 1902) was a French Romantic composer and organist.

Bernard was born in Marseille and studied at the Paris Conservatoire; his organ teacher was François Benoist and his piano teacher was Antoine François Marmontel. He was organist at the Notre Dame des Champs from 1885 until his retirement in 1895. He died in Paris.

His Fantasy and Fugue won the 1877 prize of the Société de Compositeurs de Paris. His Violin Concerto was dedicated to and performed by Pablo de Sarasate in 1895 at the Conservatoire. Other works include a Suite for Violin and Piano, a Concertstück for Piano and Orchestra, a Rondo for Cello and Orchestra, and a Divertissement for Doubled Wind Quintet (Op. 36) which was first written for the Société des Instruments à Vent.

== Media ==
Divertissement for Doubled Wind Quintet, Op. 36
1. Andante and 2. Allegro

3. Vivace

4. Andante and 5. Allegro
Performed by the Soni Ventorum Wind Quintet with other artists
