= Urbain Dubois =

French chef (1818–1901)

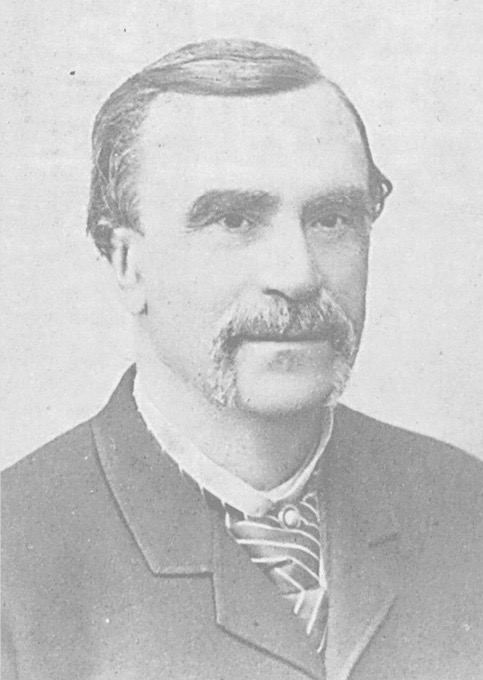
- Born: Urbain François Dubois; 26 May 1818; Trets, France
- Died: 14 March 1901 (aged 82); Nice, France
- Occupations: Chef; cookbook author
- Known for: Creator of Veal Orloff
- Children: Félix Dubois
- Culinary career
- Cooking style: French cuisine
- Writing career
- Genre: Cookbook
- Years active: 1856–1894

Urbain François Dubois (26 May 1818 – 14 March 1901) was a French chef who is best known as the author of a series of recipe books that became classics of French cuisine, and as the creator of Veal Orloff, a popular dish in French and Russian cuisine. He is credited with introducing service à la russe to Western European dining, and the term chef.

== Career ==
Dubois, the son of a master weaver, was born in Trets in the Bouches-du-Rhône Department of France. He trained as a chef by working in the kitchen of his uncle's hotel. His uncle, Jean Dubois, had served as a chef for General Bertrand. In 1840, Urbain Dubois moved to Paris but then in around 1845 he left the capital to travel and work as a chef in several countries in central Europe before becoming chef to Prince Alexey Orlov, an ambassador for Nicholas I of Russia. He is credited with introducing the now conventional service à la russe (in which dishes are served sequentially, instead of all at once) to Western Europe. This style of service required a menu — so that guests could gauge their appetite — and a person in charge of it, who Dubois called the chef, not until then a conventional term.

In 1860 he became chef in Berlin to the Prince regent, William of Prussia, who would become king in the following year. In 1870, at the start of the Franco-Prussian War, Dubois returned for a short period to France but after the peace treaty was signed in March 1871 he resumed his position with the Hohenzollern family. He shared the position of head chef with his compatriot, Émile Bernard, with each being responsible for the cooking on alternate months. This arrangement gave Dubois time for writing. He remained in Berlin until 1880.

== Personal life ==
Dubois married Marie-Virginie-Louise Boder on 30 December 1868 in Potsdam. They had five children: Joseph-Émile, Albert-Félix, Ernest-Eugène, Julie-Marguerite and Jeannette-Hélène. The two eldest children were born before the marriage. His second son, Félix Dubois became a journalist.

Dubois died in Nice on 14 March 1901 at the age of 82. His wife lived for another 15 years.

== Works ==
- Dubois, Urbain; Bernard, Émile (1856), La Cuisine classique, études pratiques, raisonnées et démonstratives de l'école française appliquée au service à la Russe (2 Volumes). Gallica: Volume 1, Volume 2
- Dubois, Urbain (1868), Cuisine de tous les pays, études cosmopolites où sont rassemblées nombre de recettes, allemandes, françaises, italiennes, anglaises, russes, polonaises, etc., Paris: E. Dentu, OCLC 253487087. Link is to a scan of the 3rd edition published in 1872.
- Dubois, Urbain (1871), École des cuisinières, méthodes élémentaires, économiques. Cuisine, pâtisserie, office. 1500 recettes, Paris: E. Dentu, OCLC 315602150.
- Dubois, Urbain (1872), Cuisine artistique, étude de l'école moderne (2 Volumes), Paris: E. Dentu.
- Dubois, Urbain (1878), Nouvelle Cuisine bourgeoise pour la ville et pour la campagne (PDF), Paris: Bernardin-Béchet et fils. Link is to a scan of the 8th edition published in 1888.
- Dubois, Urbain (1883), Grand Livre des pâtissiers et des confiseurs (PDF), Paris: E. Dentu.
- Dubois, Urbain (1889), La Cuisine d'aujourd'hui, école des jeunes cuisiniers, service des déjeuners, service des dîners, 250 manières de préparer les œufs, Paris: E. Dentu, OCLC 560026770.
- Dubois, Urbain (1894), La Pâtisserie d'aujourd'hui, école des jeunes pâtissiers. Grands et petits gâteaux, sujets d'ornements, entremets chauds et froids, glaces, conserves de fruits & légumes. Buffets de réceptions, bals, soirées spécialités, Paris: E. Dentu, OCLC 46592123.

Translations into English

- Dubois, Urbain (1870), Artistic cookery: A practical system suited for the use of the nobility and gentry and for public entertainments, London: Longmans Green, OCLC 560026731.
- Dubois, Urbain (1870), Cosmopolitan cookery: Popular Studies, London: Longmans Green, OCLC 22172533.
- Dubois, Urbain (1871), The Household cookery-book: Practical and Elementary Methods, London: Longmans Green, OCLC 17497231.
