= Vincent La Chapelle =

French master cook

Vincent La Chapelle (French pronunciation: [vɛ̃sɑ̃ la ʃapɛl]; 1690 or 1703 – 14 July 1745) was a French master cook who is known to have worked for Phillip Dormer Stanhope (4th Earl of Chesterfield) and William IV, Prince of Orange.

== Biography ==
La Chapelle travelled to Spain and Portugal and wrote The Modern Cook while in Chesterfield's employment (a French edition was published in 1735). An Eighteenth-century classic of the culinary arts, it exercised a strong influence on aristocratic cuisine in England. To some degree, La Chapelle borrowed some of his recipes from his predecessor François Massialot, who composed a book on court cookery and confectionery in 1692.

While working in London as cook to Lord Chesterfield, La Chapelle published his text first in three English volumes in 1733 and then in four French volumes in 1735. Entitled Le Cuisinier moderne, the work was the forerunner of a lavishly illustrated series of cookbooks that might equally well be considered art books.

In 1742 he published Le cuisinier moderne, qui apprend à donner toutes sortes de repas, en gras & en maigre, d'une manière plus délicate que ce qui en a été écrit jusqu'à présent : divisé en cinq volumes, avec de nouveaux modéles de vaisselle, & des desseins de table dans le grand goût d'aujourd'hui, gravez en taille-douce ... / par le sieur Vincent La Chapelle in The Hague. The cookbook has some prints of table settings. Many recipes are based on typical Dutch or English dishes, like steak and pies. He used many herbs and expensive oysters, some recipes are low fat, considered with his clientele; some are accompanied with rice.

La Chapelle formed a Freemason lodge on 8 November 1734, in The Hague. There is still a lodge in the Netherlands carrying his name.

After the Prince of Orange married Anne, Princess Royal and Princess of Orange in London, he returned to the Netherlands. The cook Vincent la Chapelle came to Leeuwarden and was on the salarylist in the court 1 November 1742. The stadholder knew the cook from a party held by Lord Chesterfield on 11 March 1729 because of the birthdayparty of queen Carolina.

It has recently been shown that the Saxon minister Heinrich, Graf von Bruhl, had a chef d'office who also had the surname La Chapelle, and the two made regular visits to the Meissen factory between 1737 and 1740, during the period when the radically inventive Swan service was in production. If the two La Chapelles are one and the same, which remains unknown, it would shed light on the close relationship between pastry and sugar sculpture, and silver and porcelain modelling.

== The Modern Cook (1733) ==
In the preface to The Modern Cook La Chapelle claimed that a new cookery manual was called for to replace the Cuisinier Roïal et Bourgeois by François Massialot (first published in 1691). Massialot's work needed replacing, La Chapelle claimed, because advances had been made in culinary art over the previous twenty years. While implying that Cuisinier Roïal et Bourgeois was old-fashioned about one-third of the recipes in La Chapelle's Modern Cook were borrowed from Massialot.
