= Jules Gouffé =

French chef and pâtissier

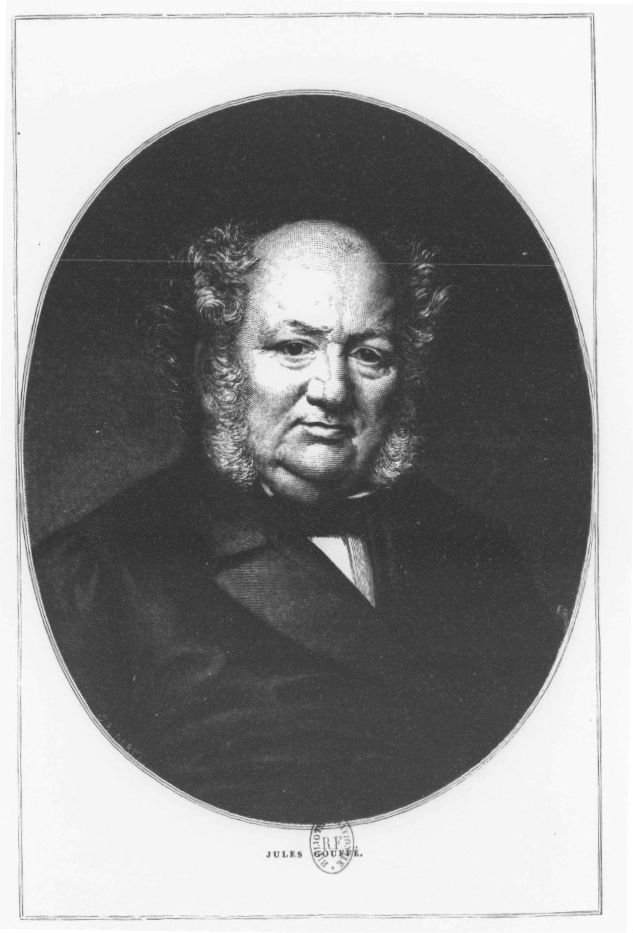
- Jules Gouffé
- Born: 1807; Paris, France
- Died: 28 February 1877 (aged 69–70); Neuilly-sur-Seine, France
- Occupation: Chef
- Notable work: Le Livre de Cuisine, Le Livre de Pâtisserie,

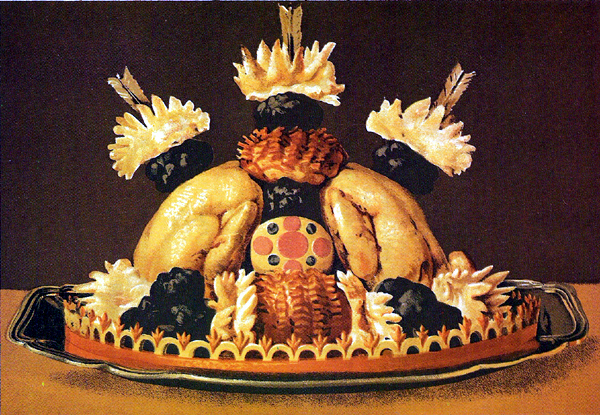
Poularde à la Godard, plate from Livre de cuisine

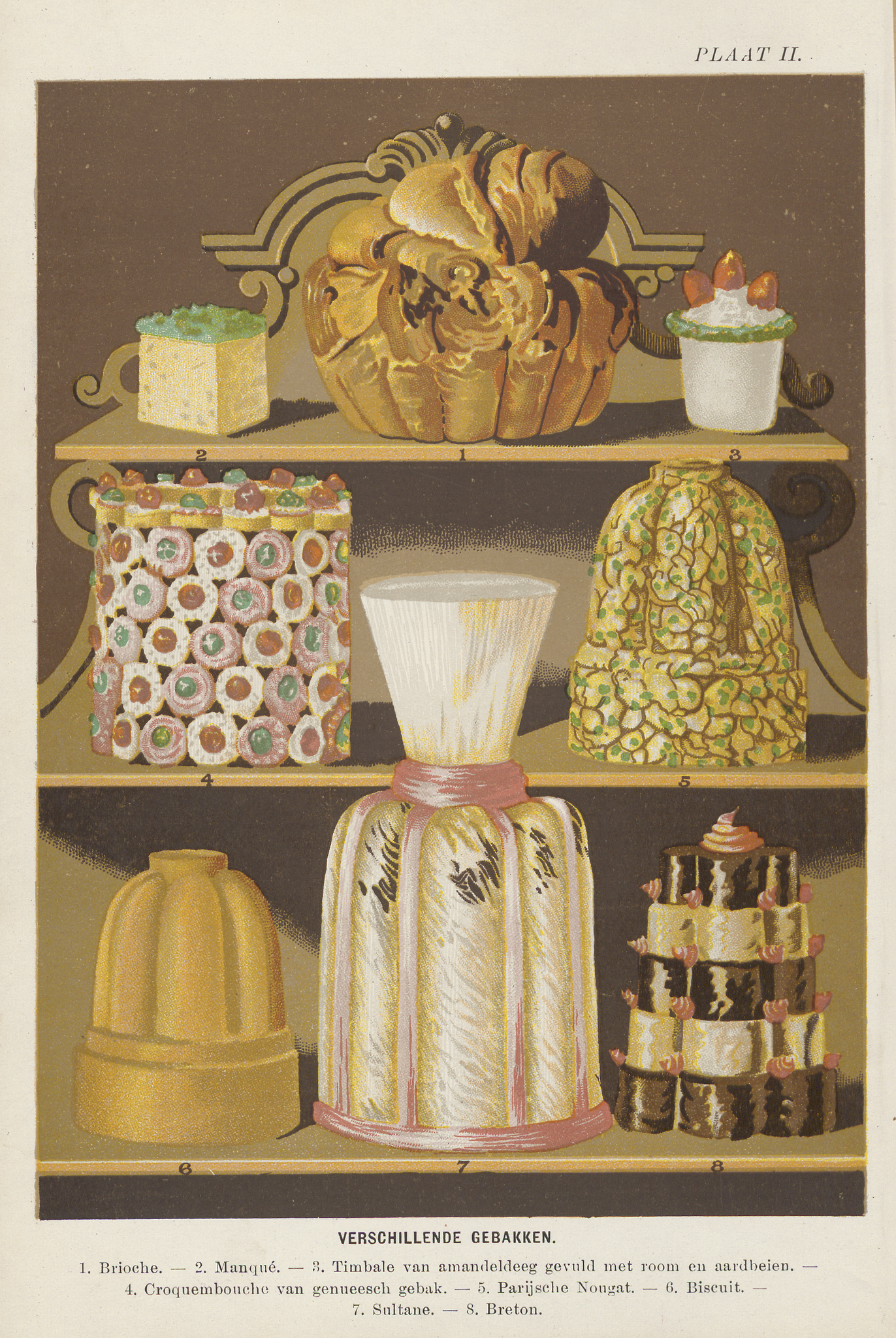
Pastries based on Gouffé's recipes

Martin Jules Gouffé (French pronunciation: [ʒyl ɡufe]; 1807 – 28 February 1877) was a French chef and pâtissier, nicknamed l'apôtre de la cuisine décorative ("The apostle of decorative cooking").

He had a deep impact on the development of French gastronomy by publishing unusually simple and precise recipes in his cookery books, of which the two best-known are Le Livre de cuisine (1867) and Le Livre de pâtisserie (1873).

== Life and career ==
Gouffé was born in 1807 at 2 rue Saint-Merri, in what is now the 4th arrondissement of Paris. His father, Pierre-Louis Gouffé, was a well-known pastry cook, and Jules and his two brothers, Alphonse and Hippolyte, all trained under him. Alphonse later became head pastry cook to Queen Victoria and Hippolyte, head chef to Count Shuvalov of Russia. Unlike them, Jules spent his entire career in Paris.

Under the guidance of Pierre-Louis, the young Gouffé learned his trade, and very early on was attracted to creating artistic presentations. He later recalled that the celebrated pâtissier and chef Antonin Carême happened to pass by and saw in the window of Gouffé senior's shop "two baskets of pastillage and a marzipan cake which were my work". Carême was impressed and took on the sixteen-year-old Gouffé as a trainee. Fifty years later, Gouffé wrote:

I began my first campaign at the grand ball which the city of Paris gave in 1823 to the Duc d'Angoulême, following the expedition to Spain. On that memorable evening, we served 7,000 people. Carême's team was responsible for the cold buffet consisting of 100 large pieces ... and 300 cold starters. We were seventeen workers and our work lasted four days.

Working under Carême, Gouffé learned the general art of cookery as well as that of pâtisserie. He later wrote: "A good pastry chef can become an excellent cook, but one rarely hears of a man trained as a cook who goes on to master pastry".

In 1838 Gouffé married Anne Suzanne Mercier. He remained under Carême's tutelage until 1840, when he opened a pâtisserie in the rue du Faubourg Saint-Honoré. The establishment flourished: workers there soon numbered twenty-eight. He sold the shop in 1855, and was persuaded by his long-time friends Charles Monselet, Baron Brisse and Alexandre Dumas senior to take over the management of the kitchens of the Jockey-Club de Paris. His biographer Edmond Neirinck writes that the Universal Exhibition of 1867 allowed Gouffé to express all his talent, but one event did not come off. The organisers had originally planned, and announced, an international gastronomy competition in a state-of-the-art building to be designed by Gouffé on the Champs de Mars, but the government decided instead to lease every available part of the site to traders.

Less than four years later, during the Siege of Paris in 1870–71, when the Prussians blockaded the city, Gouffé, like other chefs, had to exercise ingenuity and a willingness to use unfamiliar ingredients in dishes such as horse soup, mule's liver and roast leg of dog.

Gouffé retired to La Charité-sur-Loire, but he returned to Paris, where he died in the suburb of Neuilly-sur-Seine on 28 February 1877, aged 69 or 70.

== Books ==
While chef to the Jockey Club, Gouffé began writing cookery books. They were published not only in France but in translation elsewhere; the English versions were translated by his brother Alphonse. In the preface to his first book, Le Livre de cuisine (1867), Gouffé wrote:

I hesitated a long time before deciding to write the book I am publishing now. What has made me waver for many years is, I declare, the uselessness of most of the cookbooks published before this, which almost all do nothing but slavishly copy each other, repeating the same vague and often the most inaccurate recipes, all adopting the same routines and the same mistakes, specifying, in their formulas, neither weights, nor measures, nor quantities, nor cooking times, degrading our profession rather than enhancing it, in short, being of no help to anyone, neither to those who know, nor to those who have to learn.

As a chef, Gouffé became known l'apôtre de la cuisine décorative ("The apostle of decorative cooking"), but as a writer he was known for the simplicity, clarity and precision of his recipes. He stated that he not written a single one without constantly having the clock in front of him and the scales in his hand. He added that once his reader has mastered a recipe, such constant recourse to clock and scales is less necessary, but that rigorous precision in the writing of recipes is essential, as "the only way to put an end to the approximations and doubts which still hover over even the simplest preparations, and cause so many people to eat badly at home".

In The Oxford Companion to Food, Alan Davidson writes that Gouffé's most successful book was Le Livre de cuisine, "a comprehensive work which ran to nearly 900 pages and was distinguished by a number of innovations. The typographical design was clear and spacious, and the book was beautifully illustrated with nearly 200 engravings and colour lithographs". In Davidson's view, the content matched the presentation: "Gouffé wrote in a limpid style, comprehensible by all and exhibiting a standard of literary craftsmanship which equalled the author’s skill in the kitchen. This was, moreover, the first French cookery book to give metric measurements and cooking times in a systematic way".

== Legacy ==
Gouffé has been an influence on chefs including Bernard Loiseau and molecular gastronomy researchers, such as Hervé This.

== Works ==
All published by Hachette Livre, Paris

Title	English title	Date	Ref
*Le Livre de cuisine "comprenant la cuisine de ménage et la grande cuisine"	The Royal Cookery Book	1867	
*Le Livre des conserves "recettes pour préparer et conserver les viandes et les poissons salés et fumés, les terrines, les galantines, les légumes, les fruits, les confitures, les liqueurs de famille, les sirops, les petits fours, etc"	The Book of Preserves	1869	
*Le Livre de pâtisserie	The Royal Book of Pastry and Confectionery	1873	
*Le Livre de soupes et des potages "contenant plus de 400 recettes de potages français et étrangers"	The Book of Soups	1875	

== Sources ==
- Davidson, Alan (1999). "Gouffé, Jules". In Davidson, Alan (ed.). The Oxford Companion to Food. Oxford: Oxford University Press. ISBN 978-0-19-211579-9.
- Gouffé, Jules (1867). Le Livre de cuisine: comprenant la cuisine de ménage et la grande cuisine. Paris: Hachette. OCLC 1177057680.
- Jerrold, W. B. (1869). The Epicure's Year Book and Table Companion. London: Bradbury Evans. OCLC 22189390.
- Kay, Emma (2017). Cooking up History: Chefs of the Past. London: Prospect Books. ISBN 978-1-90-924853-3.
- Neirinck, Edmond (2004). "Jules Gouffé". In Jean-Pierre Poulain; Edmond Neirinck (eds.). Histoire de la cuisine et des cuisiniers : techniques culinaires et pratiques de table, en France, du Moyen-Âge à nos jours (fifth ed.). Paris: Editions LT Jacques Lanore. ISBN 2-206-03292-9.
