= Émile Bernard (chef) =

French chef (1826–1897)

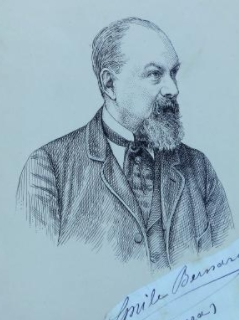

Émile Bernard (5 April 1826 – 31 August 1897) was a French chef best known as joint author of a recipe book, La Cuisine Classique, which became a classic of French cuisine.

== Biography ==
Bernard was the son of Laurent Bernard, a butcher, and grandson of Pierre Bernard, a restaurant owner. His mother's family traded faience. He trained as a chef by working in the kitchen of Vivian Jacquinot's restaurant in Lons-le-Saunier. He then moved to Turin to work in the kitchen of his uncle, before serving as a kitchen aid in a renowned hotel in Genoa, where he was spotted and hired by the governor of the city. He also traveled to Rome, Paris and Russia, where he met fellow chef Urbain Dubois.

His long and successful career at the service of kings and princes made him the greatest connoisseur of European crowned heads’ favoured tastes and cuisines. After working for the general Count Krasinski, governor of Warsaw, in the early 1850s, he worked in the kitchen of the French Foreign Affairs Ministry. Bernard was later appointed personal chef to King William I of Prussia, later Kaiser, for whom he had cooked during a state visit to Lyon. He was most notably in charge of the King's coronation banquet at Königsberg Castle in January 1861. Nonetheless, as he remained “Français de coeur”, when the war broke out between Prussia and France in 1870, Bernard left his position to return to his native land of Jura, where he eventually lived in the Château des Buvettes.

Bernard was a precursor in introducing service à la russe in France in the second half of the nineteenth century. In contrast to service à la française, where the meals were prepared and laid on the table before hand, service à la russe introduced a new manner of dining which involved courses being prepared, carved and plated in the kitchen and sent out sequentially whilst still hot.

Bernard also wrote together with friend and fellow chef, Urbain Dubois, whom he had met in Russia, the nineteenth century classic La Cuisine classique, études pratiques, raisonnées et démonstratives de l'école française appliquée au service à la Russe (1856), which was republished a dozen times up until the beginning of the twentieth century.
