= List of mayonnaises =

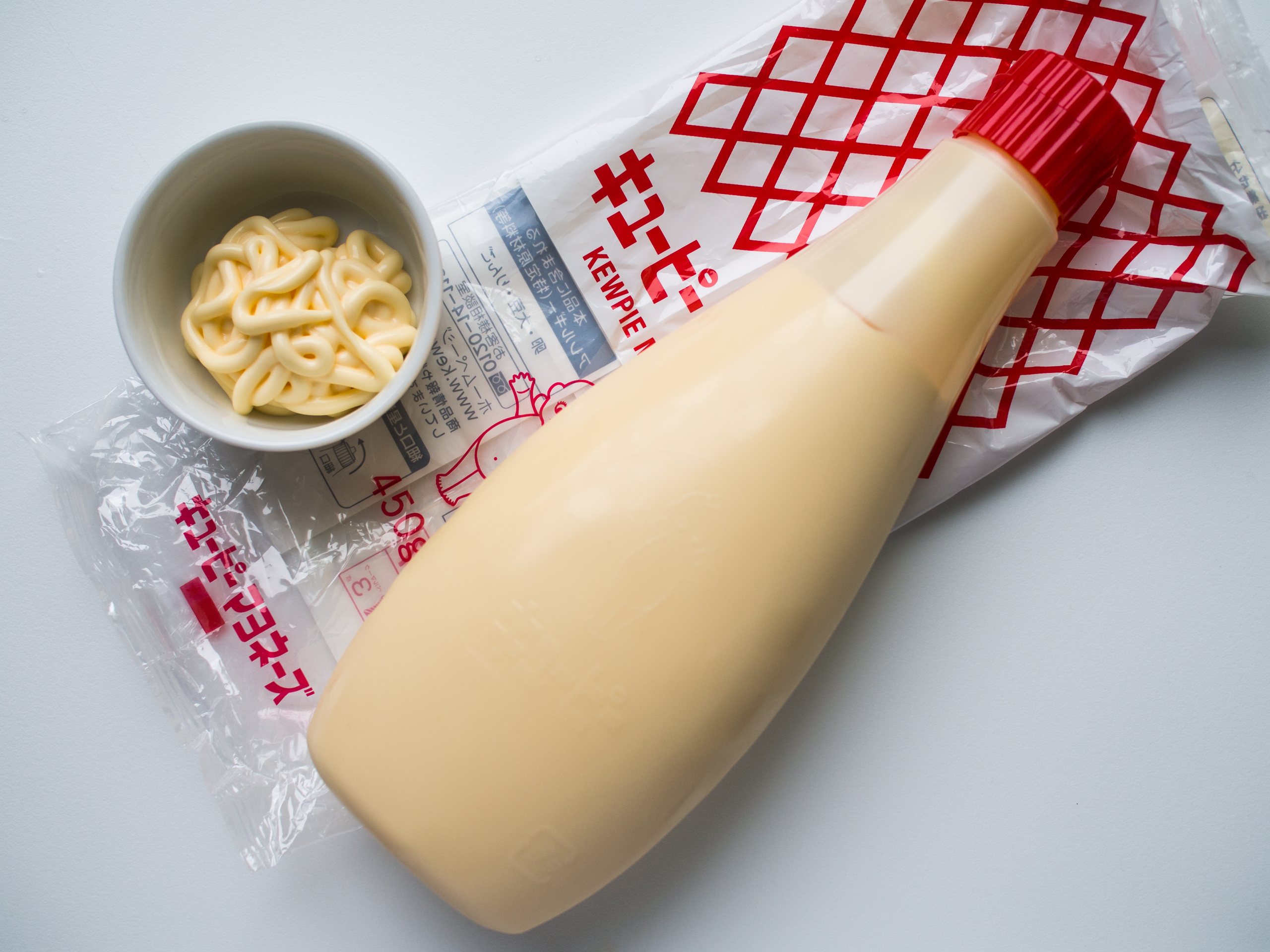
Kewpie mayonnaise

This is a list of notable mayonnaises and mayonnaise-based sauces. Mayonnaise is a thick cold sauce or dressing and also forms the base for many other sauces. It is an emulsion of oil, egg yolk, and an acid (usually vinegar or lemon juice).

== Mayonnaises ==
=== Brands ===
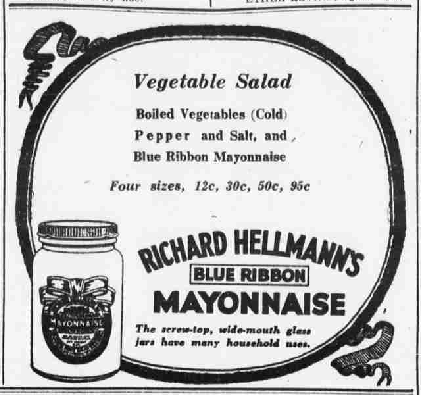
Hellmann's Blue Ribbon ad from 1922

- Blue Plate Mayonnaise – Brand of mayonnaise
- Duke's Mayonnaise – American brand of mayonnaise
- Praise – Australian brand of mayonnaise
- Zoosh – Australian brand of mayonnaise
- Hellmann's and Best Foods – Food brands
- Jimmy Mayonnaise and Sauces - Indian Brand of Mayonnaise
- Kewpie – Japanese mayonnaise brand
- Kielecki Mayonnaise – Polish mayonnaise brand from Kielce
- Kraft Mayo – Mayonnaise brand
- Magnolia – Brand owned by San Miguel Corporation

=== Mayonnaise-based sauces ===
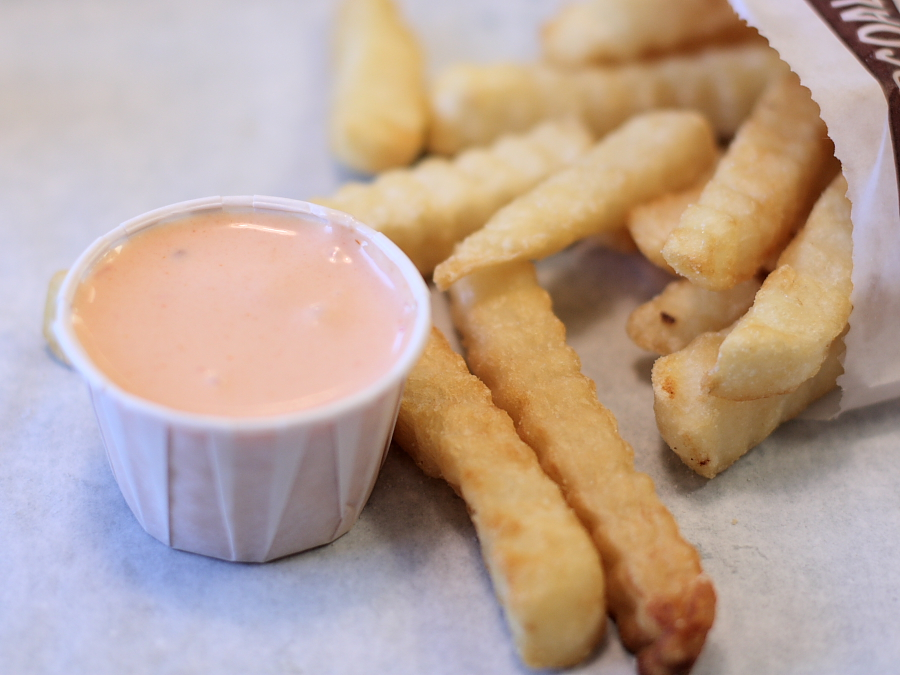
Fry sauce with fries

Mayonnaise is used as a foundation for several sauces, including some found in French cuisine.

- Baconnaise – Brand of bacon-flavored condiment
- Fry sauce – Condiment for French fries made from a mix of ketchup and mayonnaise
- Honey dill – Condiment
- Joppiesaus – Type of sauce from the Netherlands
- Just Mayo – Vegan condiment brand
- Lady's Choice – Philippine condiment brand
- Louis dressing – Salad dressing
- Remoulade – Mayonnaise-based cold sauce
- Marie Rose sauce – British condiment
- Russian dressing – American salad dressing
- Salsa golf – Cold sauce of mayonnaise and tomatoes
- Samurai sauce – Franco-Belgian condiment
- Sauce andalouse – Belgian sauce
- Tartar sauce – Mayonnaise-based cold sauce
- Thousand Island dressing – North American salad dressing and condiment

== See also ==
- Boiled dressing
- Fritessaus
- List of condiments
- List of sauces
- Miracle Whip – developed in 1933 as a less expensive alternative to mayonnaise
