= Comeback sauce =

Sauce for fried food from Mississippi

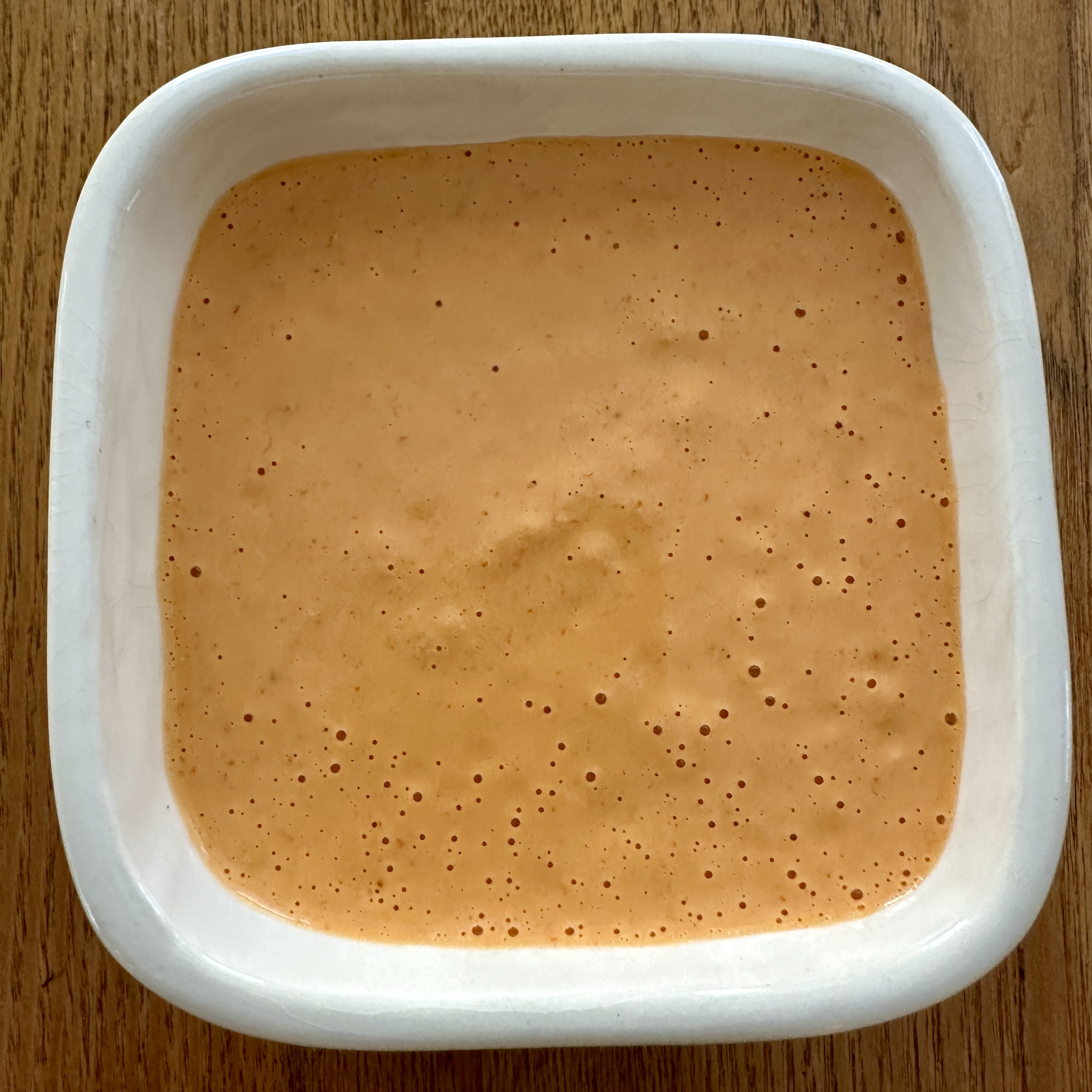
Comeback sauce

Comeback sauce is a dipping sauce used for fried foods or as a salad dressing in the cuisine of central Mississippi, in the United States of America. Its main ingredients are mayonnaise and ketchup or chili sauce. It was created at the Jackson, Mississippi, restaurant The Rotisserie. It is generally known throughout the southern US.

== Description ==
The sauce is orange-to-pink and typically a thick liquid. It is spicier than ranch dressing and is creamier and less sweet than barbecue sauce. The Takeout described it as "a spicier type of Thousand Island salad dressing". Southern Living described it as "creamy, tangy, sweet, savory, and mildly spicy".

== Ingredients and preparation ==
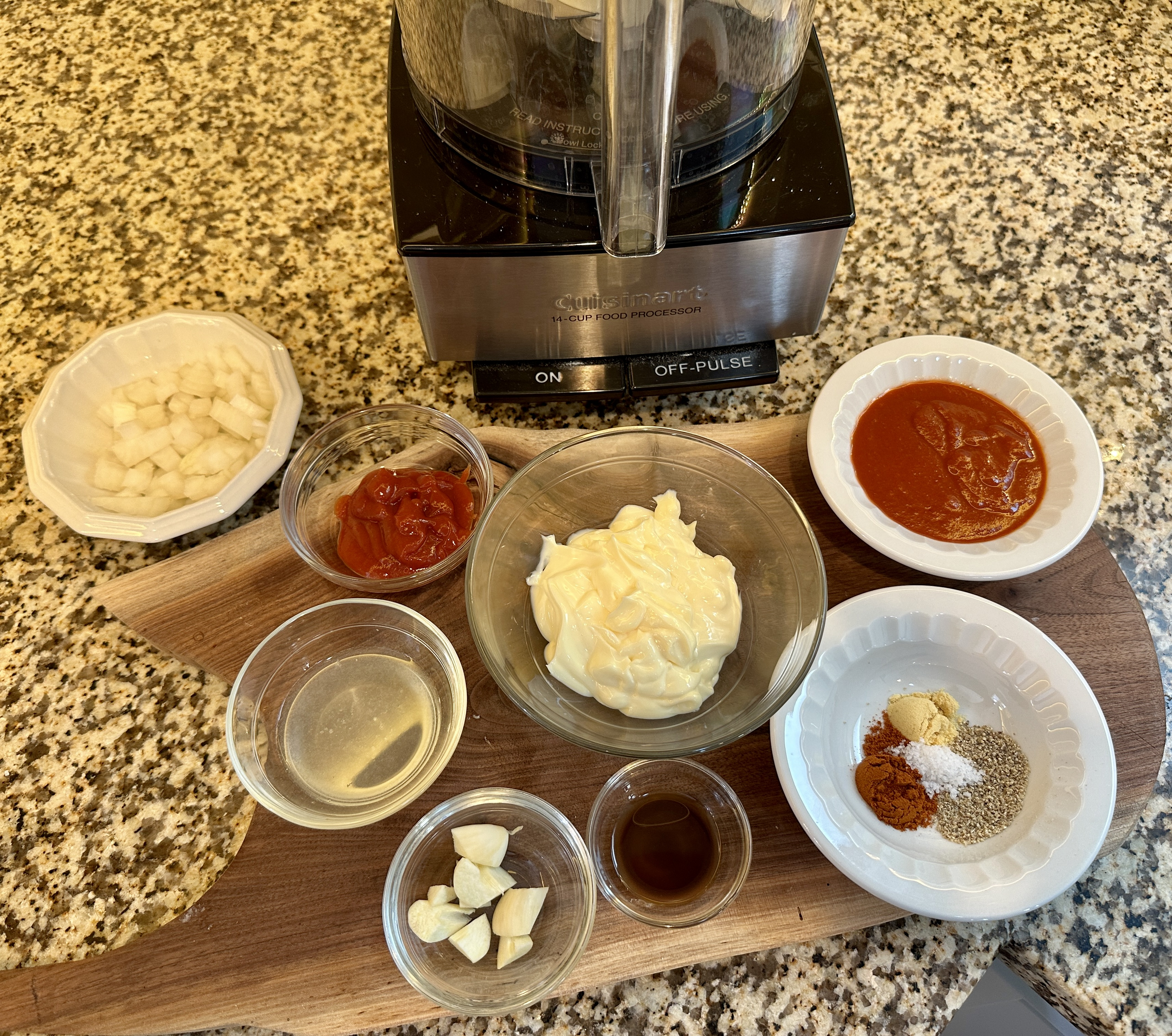
Ingredients for comeback sauce

According to the New York Times, the essential ingredients are garlic and mayonnaise.

Similar to Louisiana remoulade, the base of the sauce consists of mayonnaise and chili sauce or ketchup or both. Many recipes also call for the addition of other ingredients such as Worcestershire sauce, hot sauce, onion, lemon juice, and seasonings.

Modern recipes typically call for ingredients to be assembled in a blender or food processor and processed until well-combined.

== Serving ==
The sauce was originally served as a dressing on iceberg lettuce or as a topping for saltines but eventually saw usage as a drizzle on crab cakes or tacos, a sauce for sandwiches, and a dipping sauce for crudites or fried foods. In some restaurants it is served alongside a basket of crackers.

== History and importance ==
The sauce began to appear in Greek restaurants in Jackson, Mississippi from the late 1920s. As of the 1970s and 1980s it was still most commonly found in Jackson's Greek restaurants. It spread from Jackson into other parts of Mississippi and then throughout the south; it is not well known outside of the southern US.

Its invention has been credited to one of two restaurants, either the Mayflower Cafe or The Rotisserie, but in a 2016 interview with the Clarion-Ledger, Mayflower owner Jerry Kountouris said "It was The Rotisserie".

In 2014, it was the subject of a lecture at the Southern Foodways Alliance symposium.

Food historian Robert St. John called it "the Queen Mother of all Mississippi condiments". The Washington Post called it a "Southern staple".

== Commercial versions ==
Several restaurants in Jackson offer bottled comeback sauce. KFC offers its version of comeback sauce also outside of the Southeast.

== See also ==
- Russian dressing
- Thousand Island dressing
- Fry sauce
- Yum yum sauce
