= Pink sauce =

Pink sauce refers to any sauce that is pink or pinkish in color:

- Cocktail sauce
- Vodka sauce
- Fry sauce, a combination of tomato ketchup and mayonnaise
- Marie Rose sauce, a British condiment made from fresh tomatoes and mayonnaise
- A blend of marinara sauce with alfredo cheese sauce, sometimes known as Parma Rosa or Rosatella sauce
- Pink Sauce, an American dipping sauce that went viral on TikTok over safety and labeling concerns
