= Yum yum sauce =

American-Japanese condiment

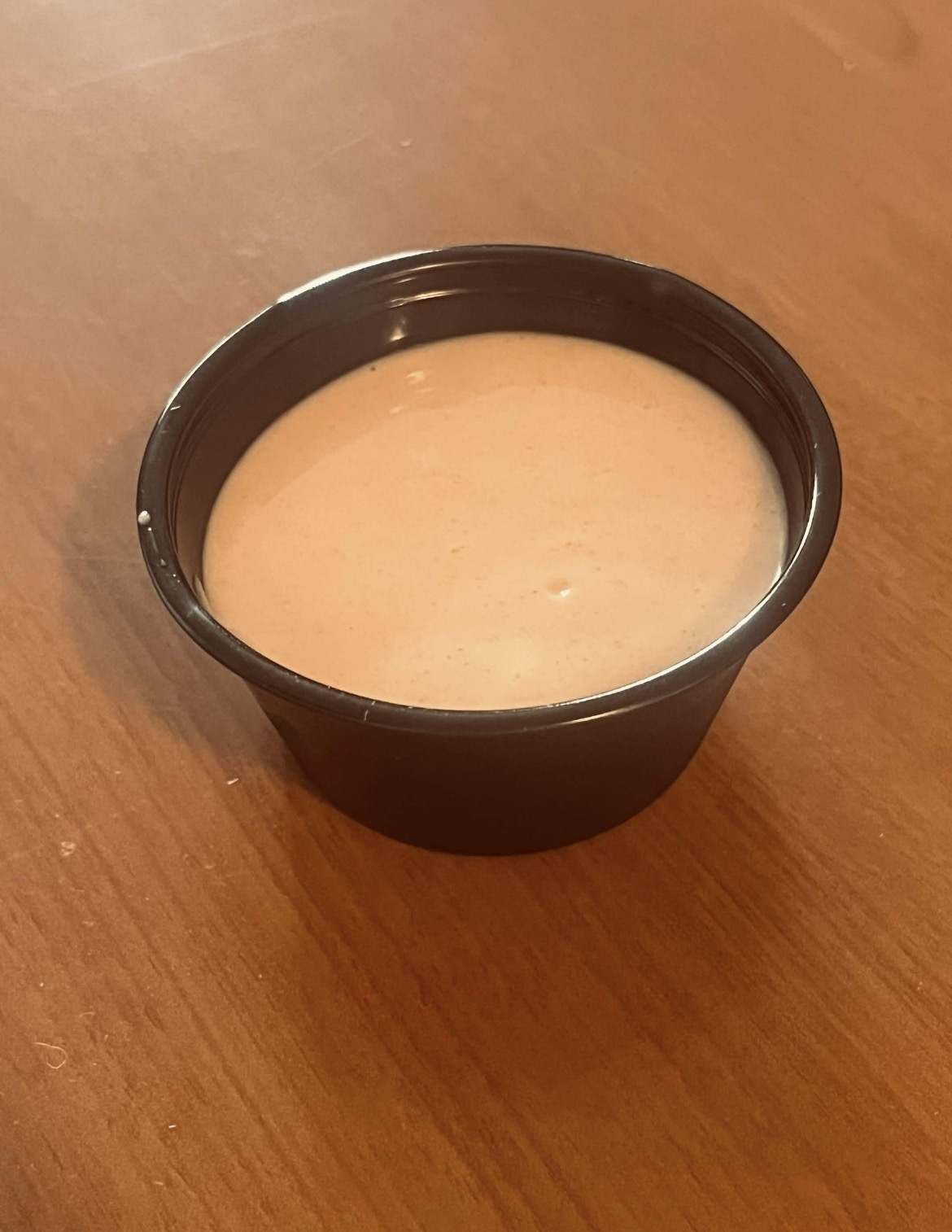
- A small cup of yum yum sauce.
- Alternative names: Yummy sauce, white sauce, and shrimp sauce
- Type: Condiment
- Associated cuisine: American-Japanese cuisine
- Main ingredients: Mayonnaise, ketchup
- Ingredients generally used: Sriracha, chili sauce, and other spices and flavorings.

Yum yum sauce, also called yummy sauce, white sauce, and shrimp sauce, is a condiment in American-Japanese cuisine.

== History ==
In the United States, yum yum sauce is frequently served at Japanese steakhouses such as Benihana. The origin of the sauce is unknown, but it likely developed due to the popularity of mayonnaise in both Japanese and American cuisine. Japanese American chef Koichi Maeda claimed to have invented yum yum sauce at his Charleston, South Carolina, restaurant in 1985 by stirring ketchup into heavy mayonnaise, with the intent to use it as a replacement for kewpie mayo. The sauce is particularly popular in the Southern United States, where mayonnaise-based sauces are widespread.

One of the most popular brands in the United States is Terry Ho's. The brand was founded by Taiwanese immigrant Terry Ho, who decided to bottle the sauce from his restaurant Hibachi Express after customers repeatedly requested large containers of it. Terry Ho's was originally distributed in Piggly Wiggly stores around 2011, and began to be distributed nationally in 2012. Ho later arranged for it to be distributed in commissaries on United States Military bases. As of 2021, it produced about six million bottles of sauce each year.

== Description ==
The sauce may include ingredients such as mayonnaise, ketchup, mirin, rice vinegar, and various spices. Oliver Whang of NPR described at as being creamy, tangy, and slightly sweet. Although it is frequently referred to as "white sauce", it generally has a pink color caused by the inclusion of ketchup. It contains no shrimp, despite being commonly named "shrimp sauce". Most restaurants use a proprietary recipe for their sauce. The exact ingredients and flavor varies between each recipe, with some regional variations resembling fry sauce, another mayonnaise and ketchup-based condiment.

== See also ==
- Thousand Island dressing, a similar mayonnaise-ketchup combination
- Russian dressing
- Fry sauce
- Marie Rose sauce
- Salsa golf
- Big Mac sauce, a similar mayonnaise-ketchup combination
