= Creole mustard =

Condiment originating from southern Louisiana

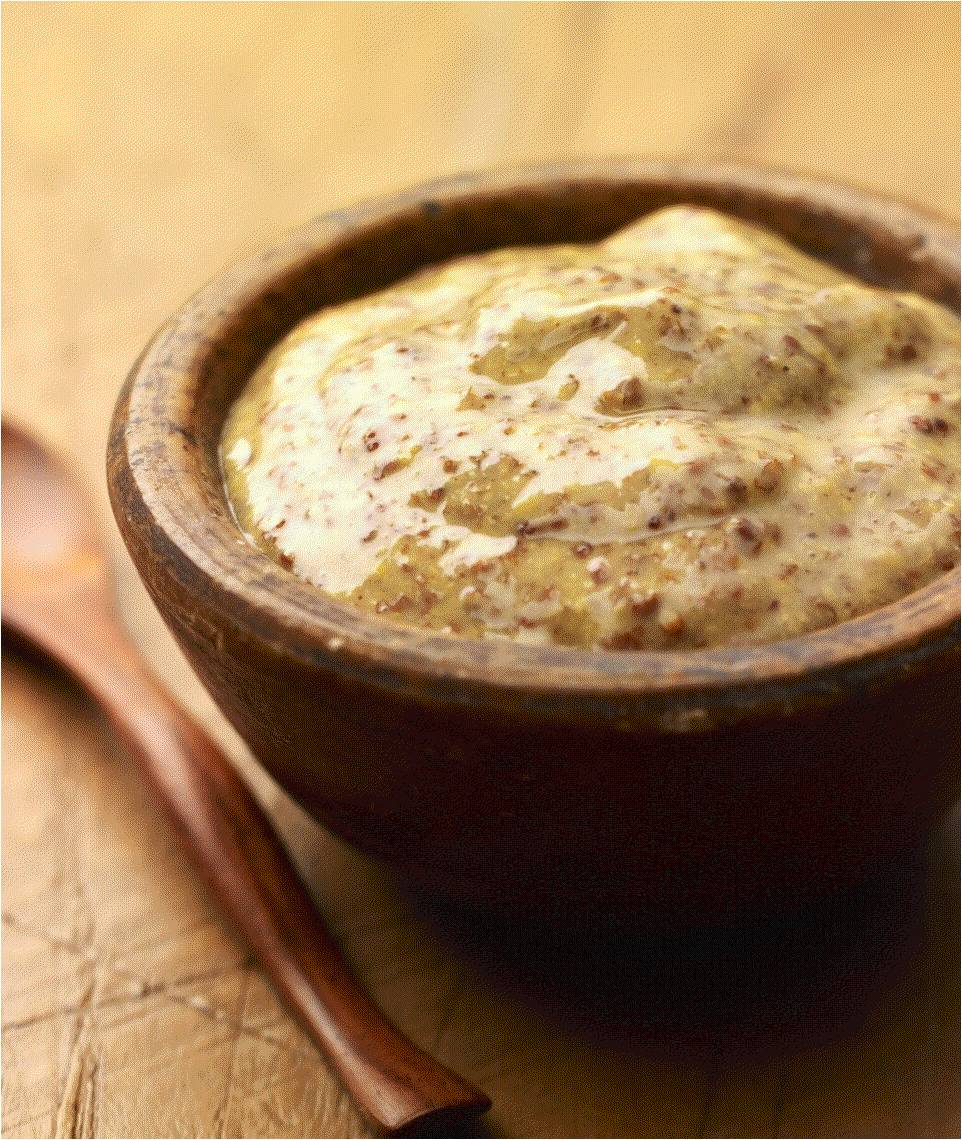
- A small dish of prepared Creole mustard
- Region or state: Southeastern United States, Louisiana
- Main ingredients: brown mustard seeds; vinegar; horseradish
- Ingredients generally used: assorted spices

Creole mustard is a condiment found most commonly in the Southeastern region of the United States, specifically Louisiana. A staple in New Orleans-style cuisine, Creole mustard is a blend of Spanish, French, African, and German influences.

The mustard is traditionally made with brown mustard seeds which have been marinated in vinegar, often white wine vinegar, horseradish and assorted spices before being packed or ground. It owes its grainy appearance to the use of coarse-ground mustard seeds.

Creole mustard is a versatile condiment featured on po' boy sandwiches and used in sauces, dressings and dips for everything from vegetables to salads to pretzels and chips. It can be used to create a marinade for meats, and can be incorporated into seafood dishes, such as crab cakes, battered seafood or served as a glaze or dipping sauce, as well. It is also the key ingredient found in New Orleans-style or Creole-style remoulade sauce.
