= Sloppy joe (New Jersey) =

Cold delicatessen sandwich

Sloppy Joe
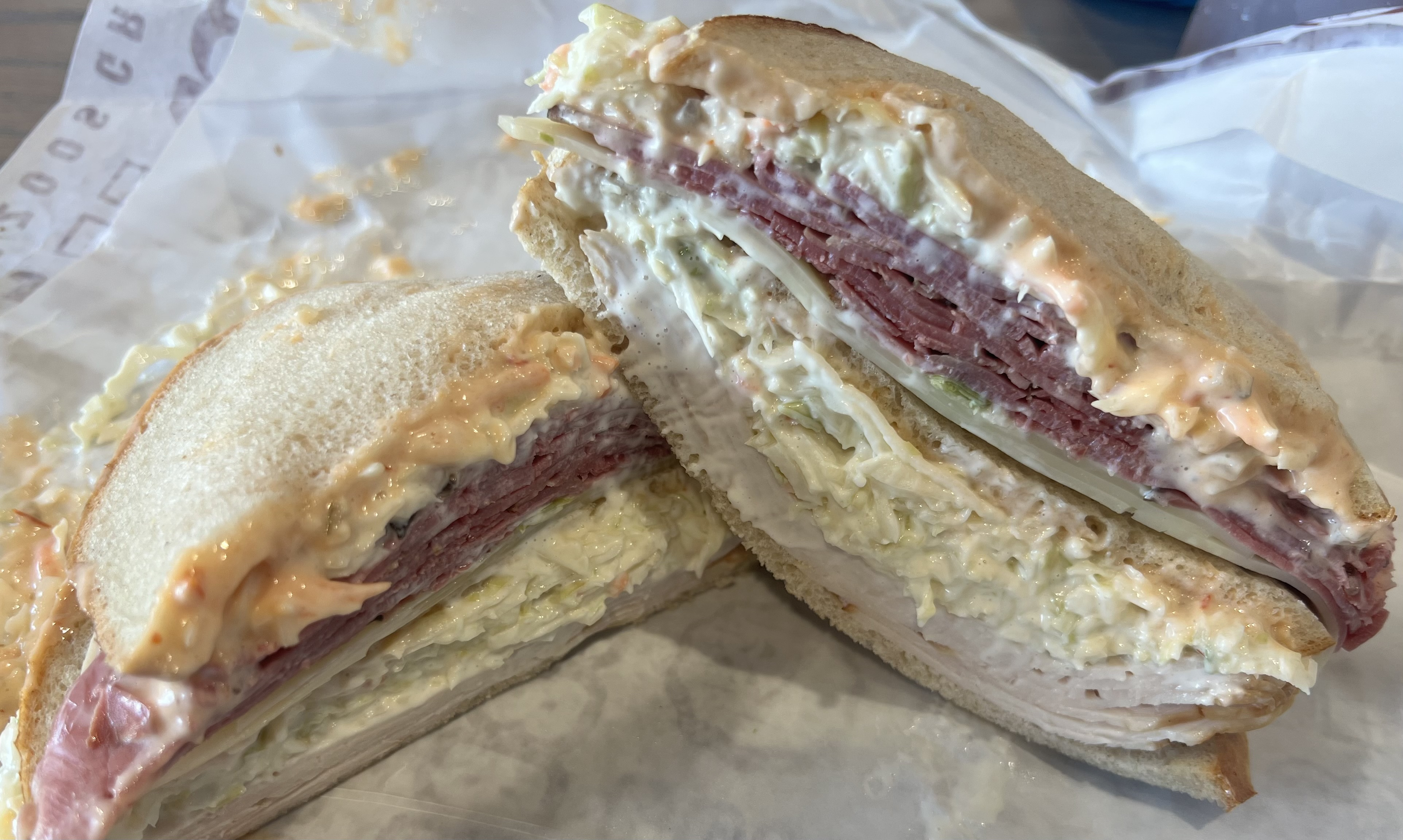
- A turkey and pastrami sloppy joe from the Millburn Deli of Morristown in Morristown, New Jersey
- Course: Main course
- Place of origin: United States
- Region or state: Northern New Jersey
- Main ingredients: Thin-sliced rye bread, sliced deli meat, Swiss cheese, coleslaw, and Russian dressing
- Variations: Multiple

Throughout much of northern New Jersey, a sloppy joe is a cold delicatessen sandwich traditionally made as a double-decker on thin-sliced rye bread. The sandwich typically contains one or more varieties of sliced deli meat, including turkey, ham, pastrami, corned beef, roast beef, or sliced beef tongue, combined with coleslaw, Russian dressing, and sometimes Swiss cheese.

Turkey is generally considered the standard meat used in the sandwich, often paired with corned beef or roast beef. Depending on the delicatessen, variations may differ in meat combinations or preparation style. Some delis, such as Mr. J's Deli in Cranford, distinguish ham-based versions as a regular joe. The Millburn Deli in Millburn is among the best-known establishments associated with the sandwich.

The Town Hall Deli in South Orange claims to have invented the New Jersey sloppy joe during the 1930s. According to local tradition, Maplewood politician Thomas Sweeney returned from a trip to Cuba after visiting Sloppy Joe's in Havana, where patrons assembled sandwiches from assorted meats and toppings. Sweeney later requested similar sandwiches for poker gatherings catered by Town Hall Deli, helping popularize the dish in northern New Jersey.

During the mid-20th century, the sandwich became popular in Jewish delicatessens throughout Newark and surrounding communities, contributing to its association with the delicatessen culture of the region. Mainstream supermarkets and delis in New Jersey sometimes label the sandwich as a turkey sloppy joe to distinguish it from the unrelated ground beef sandwich commonly known elsewhere in the United States.

A related sandwich sometimes known as the New York deli turkey sandwich is also found in the New York metropolitan area. While it similarly includes turkey, coleslaw, and Russian dressing on rye bread, it is usually served as a single-layer sandwich rather than the traditional double-decker New Jersey style.

== See also ==
- Cuisine of New Jersey
- List of sandwiches
- Reuben sandwich
