= Arctic Circle Restaurants =

Burger chain based in Midvale, Utah, United States

Arctic Circle Restaurants, Inc.

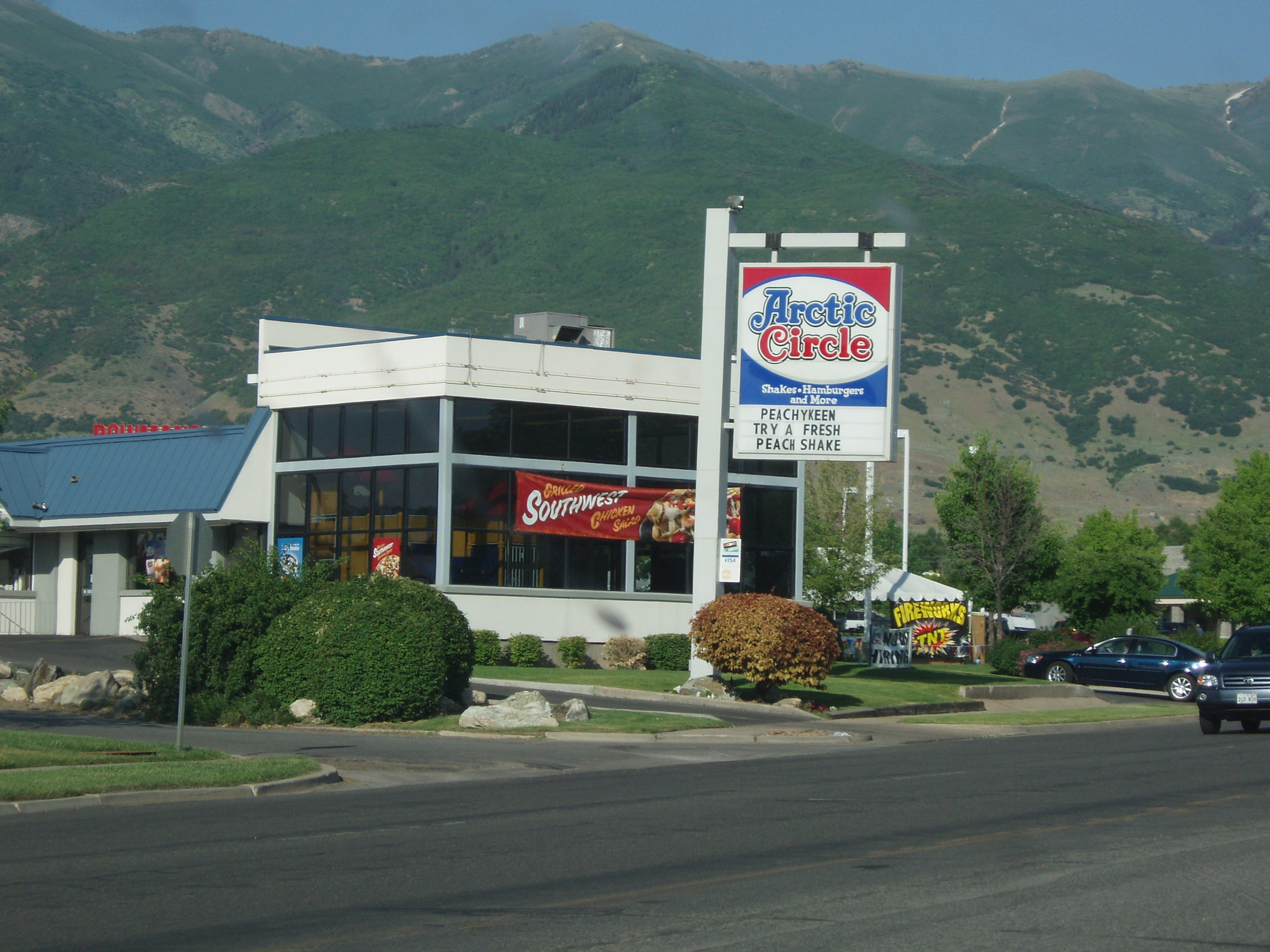
- An Arctic Circle restaurant in Kaysville, Utah, July 2008
- Trade name: Arctic Circle
- Type: Private
- Industry: Restaurants Franchising
- Founded: 1950; 76 years ago Salt Lake City, Utah, United States
- Founders: Don Carlos Edwards
- Headquarters: Midvale, Utah
- Number of locations: 70
- Area served: Utah; Idaho; Nevada; Arizona; Oregon; Washington; Wyoming
- Key people: Gary Roberts (President and CEO); Frank L. Christianson (CFO)
- Products: Fast food
- Revenue: ▲US$135 million (FY 2021)
- Owner: Edwards family
- Number of employees: ▲900 (FY 2021)
- Website: acburger.com

Arctic Circle Restaurants is an American chain of burger and shake restaurants based in Midvale, Utah, United States.

== Description ==
As of March 2022 there were over 70 restaurants in seven states, about half company-owned and the rest owned by franchisees, and about half of the restaurants in Utah. They serve typical fast food such as burgers, sandwiches, shakes, salads, fries and fish and chips.

The company claims to have invented the regional condiment fry sauce, and that it was the first burger chain to invent and sell the kids' meal. It reportedly serves approximately 120 gallons of fry sauce per day.

== Origins ==
In 1924, Don Carlos Edwards established a small refreshment stand at a Pioneer Day celebration. By 1941 it had grown into a thriving BBQ restaurant. Edwards subsequently opened the first Arctic Circle restaurant in Salt Lake City, Utah, in 1950. At its peak, the chain operated 308 locations. Shortly after opening Arctic Circle, Edwards introduced “pink sauce,”, a thousand island dressing-like combination of mayonnaise and ketchup. This later became known as “fry sauce.” The sauce was originally intended as a burger condiment before Edwards realized it was better as a dipping sauce.

== See also ==
- List of hamburger restaurants
