= Reuben sandwich =

Type of sandwich with meat and sauerkraut

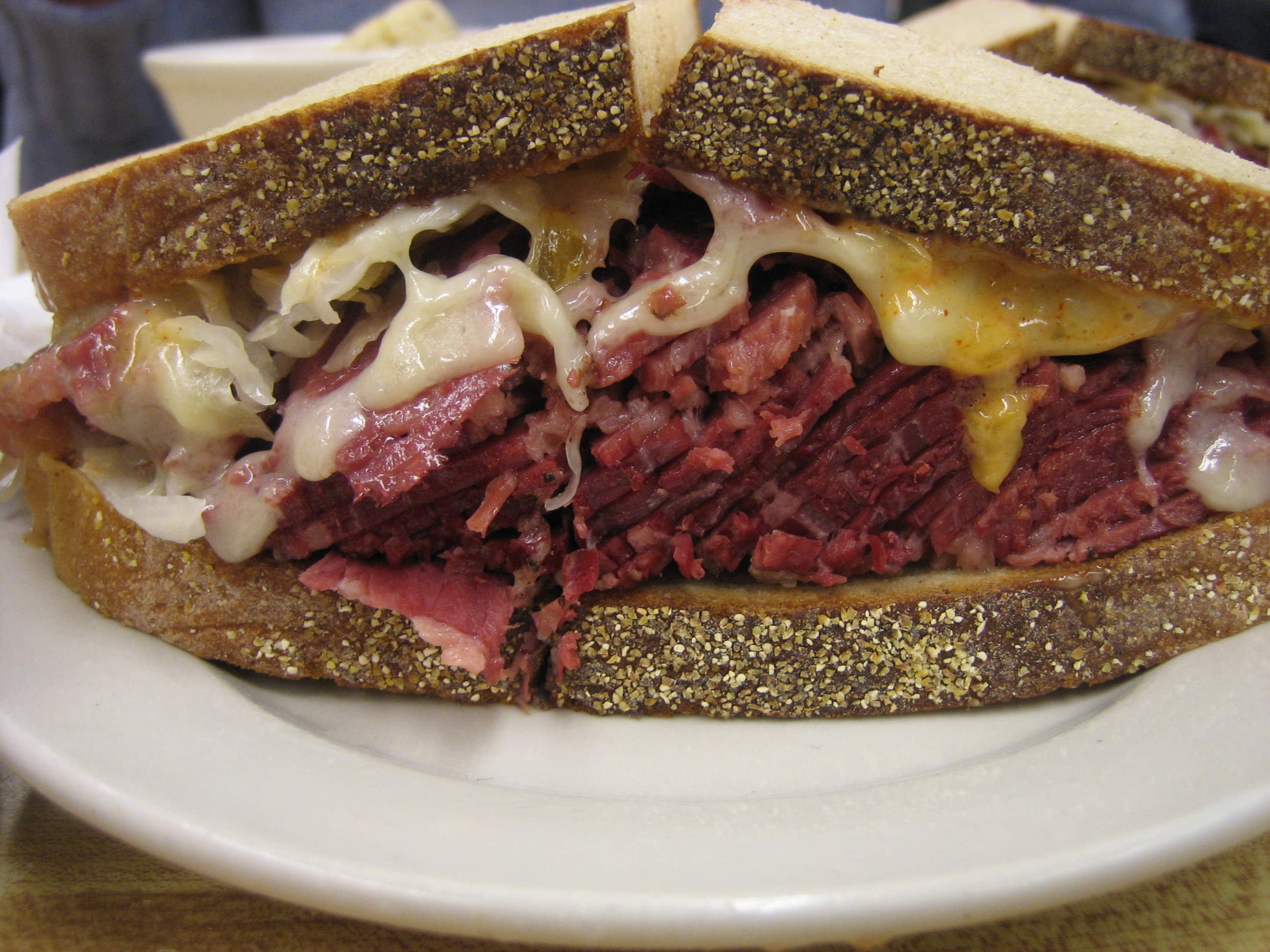
- Reuben from Katz's Delicatessen
- Type: Sandwich
- Course: Main
- Place of origin: United States
- Created by: Various claims
- Serving temperature: Warm or hot
- Main ingredients: Corned beef, sauerkraut, Swiss cheese, rye bread, Thousand Island dressing or Russian dressing

The Reuben sandwich is an American grilled sandwich comprising corned beef, Swiss cheese, sauerkraut, and Russian dressing or Thousand Island dressing, grilled between slices of rye bread. The sandwich is traditionally grilled or toasted until the bread is crisp and the cheese has melted.

The Reuben is commonly associated with kosher-style delicatessens in the United States, particularly in cities with large Jewish immigrant communities such as New York City. Despite this association, the sandwich is not considered kosher under traditional Jewish dietary law because it combines meat and dairy products.

The origins of the sandwich are disputed. One popular account attributes its creation to Reuben Kulakofsky, a grocer from Omaha, Nebraska, who is said to have requested the sandwich during a poker game in the 1920s. Another claim credits Arnold Reuben, owner of Reuben's Delicatessen in New York City, with inventing it earlier in the 20th century.

== Possible origins ==
One origin story holds that Reuben Kulakofsky (his first name sometimes spelled Reubin; his last name sometimes shortened to Kay), a Lithuanian-born Jewish grocer residing in Omaha, Nebraska, asked for a sandwich made of corned beef and sauerkraut at his weekly poker game held in the Blackstone Hotel from around 1920 through 1935. The participants, who nicknamed themselves "the committee", included the hotel's owner, Charles Schimmel. Schimmel's son, who worked in the kitchen, made the first Reuben for him, adding Swiss cheese and thousand island dressing to his order, putting the whole thing on rye bread. The sandwich first gained local fame when Schimmel put it on the Blackstone's lunch menu, and its fame spread when a former employee of the hotel won the national sandwich idea contest with the recipe. In Omaha, March 14 was proclaimed Reuben Sandwich Day.

Another account holds that the Reuben's creator was Arnold Reuben, the German-Jewish owner of Reuben's Delicatessen (1908–2001) in New York City. According to an interview with Craig Claiborne, Arnold Reuben created the "Reuben Special" around 1914. Bernard Sobel in his 1953 book, Broadway Heartbeat: Memoirs of a Press Agent states that the sandwich was an extemporaneous creation for Marjorie Rambeau, inaugurated when the Broadway actress visited the Reuben's Delicatessen one night when the cupboards were particularly bare.

Still other versions give credit to Alfred Scheuing, a chef at Reuben's Delicatessen, and say he created the sandwich for Reuben's son, Arnold Jr., in the 1930s.

== Variations ==
=== Montreal Reuben ===
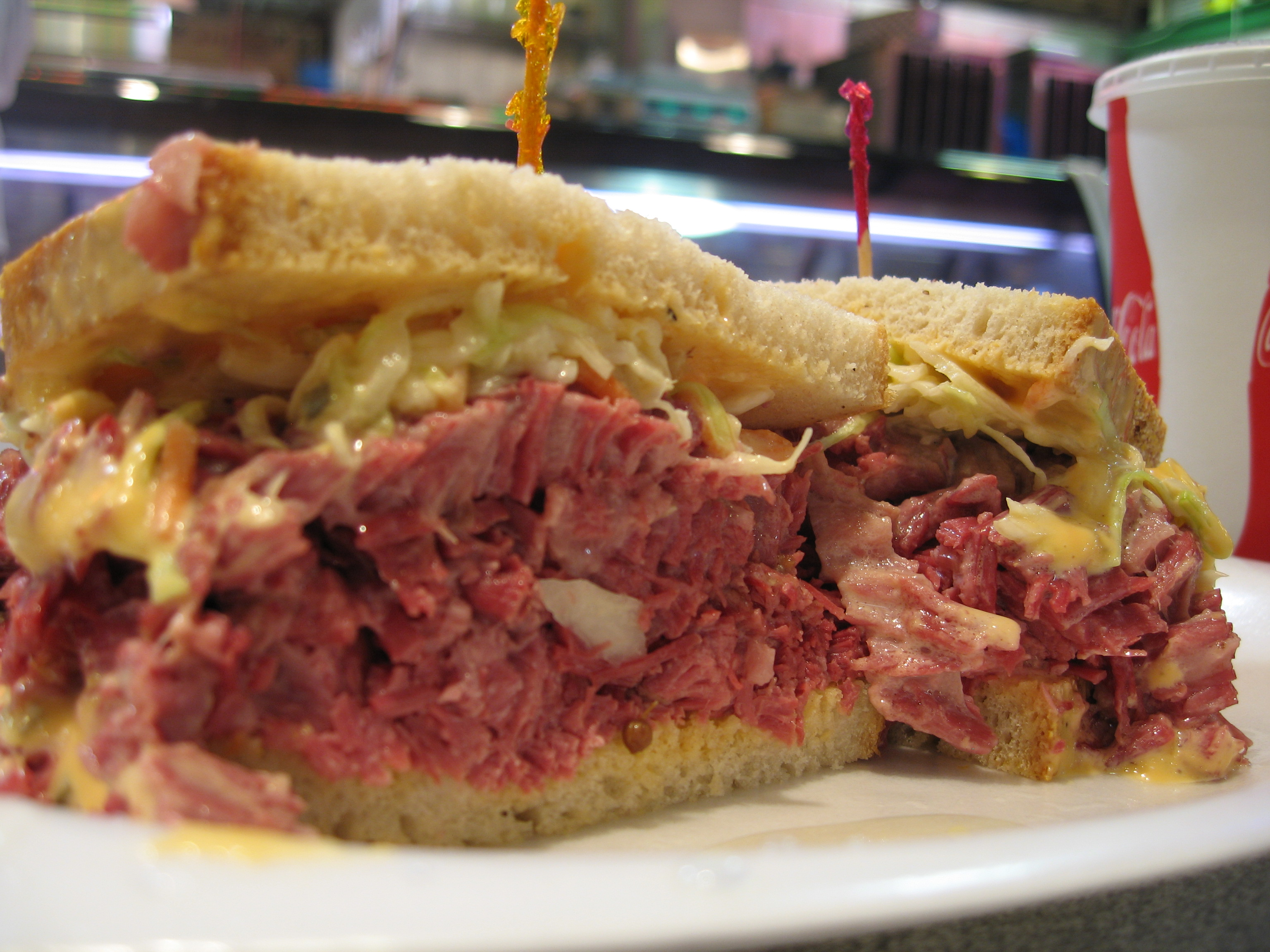
Corned beef Reuben sandwich

The Montreal Reuben substitutes Montreal-style smoked meat for the corned beef.

=== Thousand Island dressing ===
Thousand Island dressing is commonly used as a substitute for Russian dressing.

=== Walleye Reuben ===
The walleye Reuben features the freshwater fish (Sander vitreus) in place of the corned beef.

=== Grouper Reuben ===
The grouper Reuben is a variation on the standard Reuben sandwich, substituting grouper for the corned beef, and sometimes coleslaw for the sauerkraut as well. This variation is often a menu item in restaurants in Florida.

=== Reuben egg rolls ===
Reuben egg rolls, sometimes called "Irish egg rolls" or "Reuben balls", use the standard Reuben sandwich filling of corned beef, sauerkraut, and cheese inside a deep-fried egg roll wrapper. Typically served with Thousand Island dressing (instead of Russian dressing) as an appetizer or snack, they originated at Mader's, a German restaurant in Milwaukee, Wisconsin, where chef Dennis Wegner created them for a summer festival circa 1990.

=== Rachel sandwich ===
The Rachel sandwich is a variation which substitutes pastrami or turkey for the corned beef, and coleslaw for the sauerkraut. In some parts of the United States, especially Michigan, this turkey variant is known as a "Georgia Reuben" or "California Reuben", and it may also call for barbecue sauce or French dressing instead of Russian dressing. The name may have originated from the 1871 song "Reuben and Rachel".

=== Dinty Moore sandwich ===
The Dinty Moore is a variation which substitutes the sauerkraut with coleslaw. It is particularly popular in the Detroit, Michigan, area.

=== Vegetarian and vegan versions ===
Vegetarian versions, called "veggie Reubens", omit the corned beef or substitute vegetarian ingredients for it, including zucchini, cucumbers, wheatmeat, and mushrooms. Vegan versions can use the aforementioned wheatmeat also known as seitan, tempeh or mushrooms with non-dairy cheese, dressing and butter.

=== Kosher versions ===
As a Reuben combines both meat and dairy ingredients in the same meal, it is not kosher. However, it is frequently served at kosher style restaurants. Kosher versions may be made by removing the cheese, using non-dairy imitation cheese, or substituting the corned beef with a rabbinically supervised alternative.

== See also ==
- List of American sandwiches
- List of sandwiches
- Pastrami on rye
- Sloppy joe (New Jersey)
