= Prawn cocktail =

Shellfish appetizer

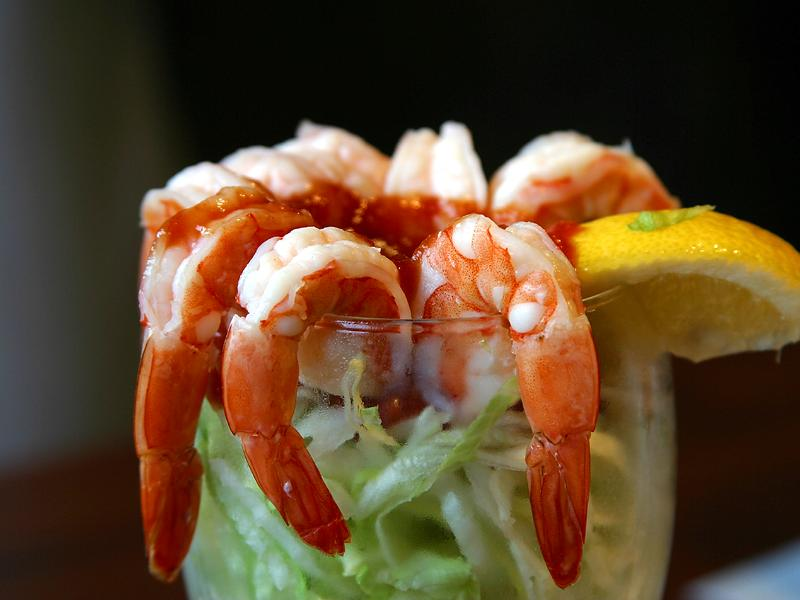
- Alternative names: Shrimp cocktail
- Course: Hors d'oeuvre
- Main ingredients: Prawns, cocktail sauce

Prawn cocktail, also known as shrimp cocktail, is a seafood dish consisting of shelled, cooked prawns in a Marie Rose sauce or cocktail sauce, served in a glass. It was the most popular hors d'œuvre in Great Britain, as well as in the United States, from the 1960s to the late 1980s. According to the English food writer Nigel Slater, the prawn cocktail "has spent most of (its life) see-sawing from the height of fashion to the laughably passé" and is now often served with a degree of irony.

The cocktail sauce is essentially ketchup and mayonnaise in Commonwealth countries, or ketchup and horseradish in the United States. Recipes may add Worcestershire sauce, hot sauce, vinegar, cayenne pepper or lemon juice.

== History and origins ==
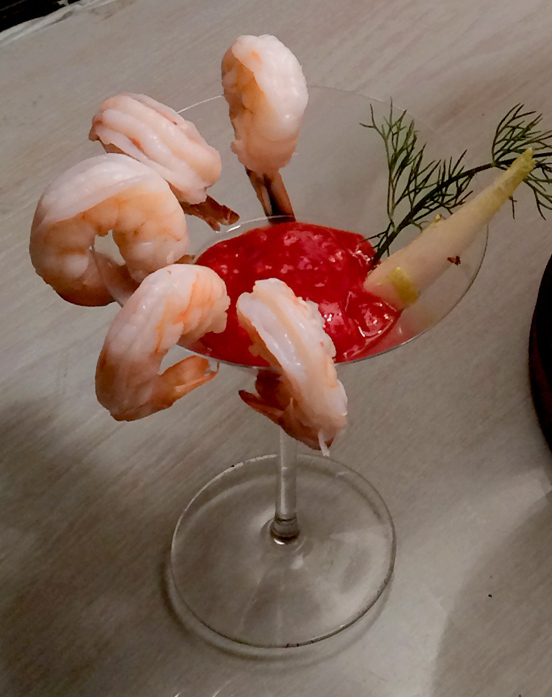
An American-style shrimp cocktail made with store-bought cocktail sauce and garnished with endive and dill

A dish of cooked seafood with a piquant sauce of some kind is of ancient origin and many varieties exist. Oyster or shrimp dishes of this kind were popular in the United States in the late nineteenth century and some sources link the serving of the dish in cocktail glasses to the ban on alcoholic drinks during the 1920s prohibition era in the United States. A version of the shrimp cocktail was popularized in Las Vegas casinos in the late 1950s, beginning with the Golden Gate Casino on Fremont Street, which sold as many as 2,000 shrimp cocktails daily, at inexpensive prices, no more than 99 cents. The dish is considered somewhat synonymous with the gambling and entertainment mecca.

In the United Kingdom, the invention of the prawn cocktail is often credited to British television chef Fanny Cradock in the 1960s; In their 1997 book The Prawn Cocktail Years, Simon Hopkinson and Lindsey Bareham note that the prawn cocktail has a "direct lineage to Escoffier".

== In Britain ==
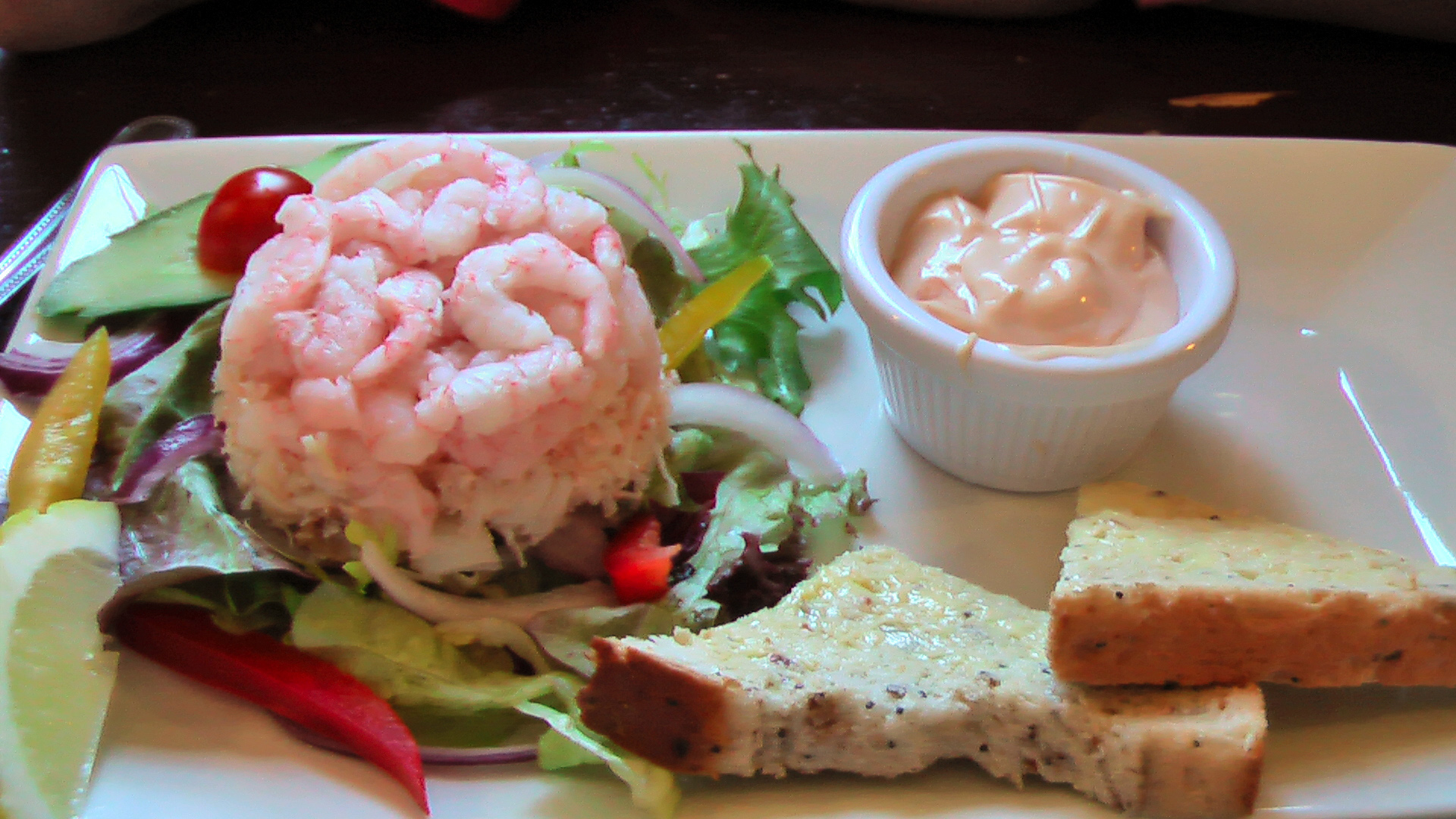
A prawn cocktail

Nigel Slater says "it is all in the sauce", and that "the true sauce is principally mayonnaise, tomato ketchup and a couple of shakes of Tabasco."

The chef Heston Blumenthal states that prawn cocktail is his "secret vice": "When I get home late after working in The Fat Duck there's nothing I like better than to raid the fridge for prawn cocktail." Blumenthal notes that it is best to use homemade mayonnaise, and recommends adding chopped basil and tarragon. The cover of his 2011 recipe book, Heston Blumenthal at Home, depicts him next to an open fridge, holding pre-cooked prawns, lettuce, lemon and other items included in the recipe.

The television chef and writer Delia Smith states that the best version is with self-cooked prawns, and that in the 1960s it was "something simple but really luscious, yet over the years it has suffered from some very poor adaptations, not least watery prawns and inferior sauces."

As Hopkinson and Bareham note in The Prawn Cocktail Years, what was once considered to be the "Great British Meal" consisted of prawn cocktail, followed by steak garni with chips and Black Forest gateau for dessert; they comment that "cooked as it should be, this much-derided and often ridiculed dinner is still something very special indeed."

== The "Prawn Cocktail Offensive" ==
Before the 1992 British general election, the Labour Party campaigned to win the support of business and financial leaders by persuading them that they would not interfere with the market economy. The campaign was lampooned as the "Prawn Cocktail Offensive".

== Spin-off products ==
The ubiquity of the prawn cocktail has led to such products as prawn cocktail flavour crisps, which are still one of the most popular varieties of this snack food in the United Kingdom. Prawn cocktail flavour crisps were the second most popular in the UK in 2004, with a 16% market share. Sandwiches with a prawn cocktail or prawn mayonnaise filling (prepared with Marie Rose sauce and mayonnaise respectively) are also popular in the UK, and were the best-selling sandwich of British supermarket chain Marks & Spencer from their introduction in 1981 until at least 2017. In 1983, on a visit to Marks & Spencer's flagship store, Prime Minister Margaret Thatcher sampled a prawn mayonnaise sandwich, declaring it "delicious".

== Variations ==
Clams, oysters, squid (as a squid cocktail), or other seafood can be substituted for shrimp. Various preparations use ingredients such as fish and octopus. Seafood cocktails often include lime juice and a tomato based sauce and are sometimes served with lemon. In the US, they are regulated by the FDA which requires the proportions by weight to be stated when the dish is sold in a prepared form.

== See also ==
- List of hors d'oeuvre
- Ceviche
- Vuelvealavida
