= Squid cocktail =

Seafood dish

- Course: Hors d'oeuvre
- Main ingredients: Squid

Squid cocktail is a seafood dish usually served as an hors d'œuvre. It is similar to a prawn cocktail, but uses squid as the main ingredient.

In 1969 in the United States, squid cocktail was one of the dishes explored to increase the popularity of squid in a time of diminishing fish stocks. Researchers at Massachusetts Institute of Technology developed a squid-gutting machine, and submitted squid cocktail, rings, and chowder to a 70-person tasting panel for market research. Despite a general lack of popularity of squid in the United States, aside from the internal "ethnic market", and polling that had shown a negative public perception of squid foods, the tasting panel gave the dishes "high marks".

== See also ==
- Cocktail sauce
- List of seafood dishes
- Squid as food
