= Salsa golf =

Cold sauce of mayonnaise and tomatoes

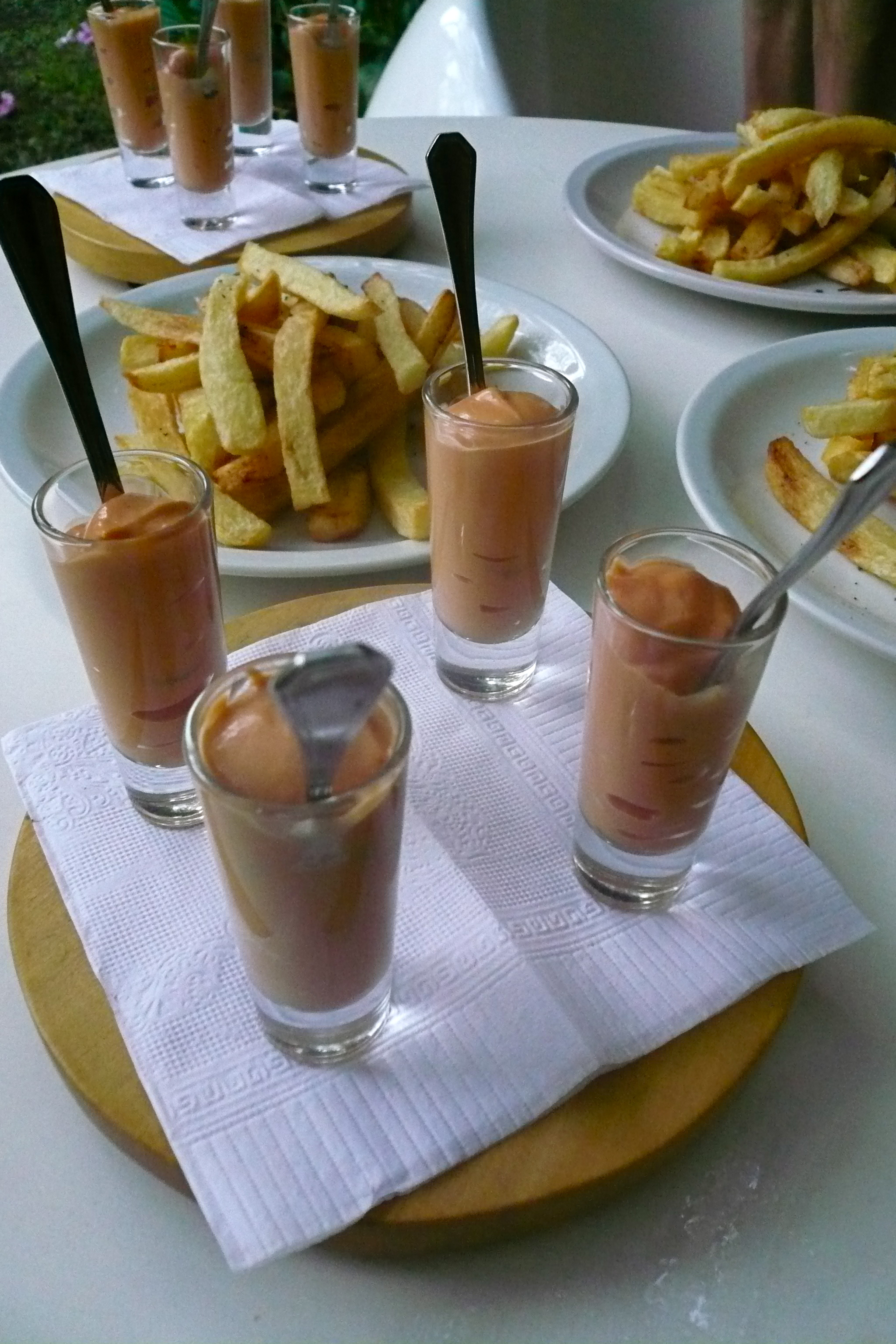
- Salsa golf served at a "taste-off" in Buenos Aires
- Type: Condiment
- Place of origin: Argentina
- Created by: Luis Federico Leloir
- Main ingredients: Mayonnaise, ketchup, pimento, oregano, cumin

Salsa golf is a cold sauce of somewhat thick consistency, common in Argentina. It is made from mayonnaise with a smaller amount of tomato-based sauce such as ketchup, as well as seasonings including pimento, oregano, and cumin. The mixture can also include Worcestershire sauce and mustard.

According to legend, the sauce was invented by the physician Luis Federico Leloir in the mid-1920s at the golf club of the seaside resort Mar del Plata. Tired of eating shrimp and prawn with mayonnaise, he asked the waiter to bring various ingredients (vinegar, lemon, mustard, ketchup, and others) and experimented with different mixtures. The favourite was ketchup and mayonnaise. Leloir's companions named the result salsa golf, and its fame grew. Soon it spread to neighboring Uruguay while also being common in Chile.

Salsa golf is used to dress salad, meat, and other food, and it is the main ingredient in a typical Argentine dish called palmitos en salsa golf. In neighboring Paraguay, salsa golf is also popular and is sometimes eaten with quail eggs. In countries outside South America, salsa golf is more commonly known as Marie Rose sauce or fry sauce.

The Argentine dish revuelto Gramajo is often served with this sauce.

== See also ==
- Comeback sauce
- Russian dressing
- Thousand Island dressing
- List of dips
- List of sauces
- Mayochup
