= Kielecki Mayonnaise =

Polish mayonnaise brand

Majonez Kielecki
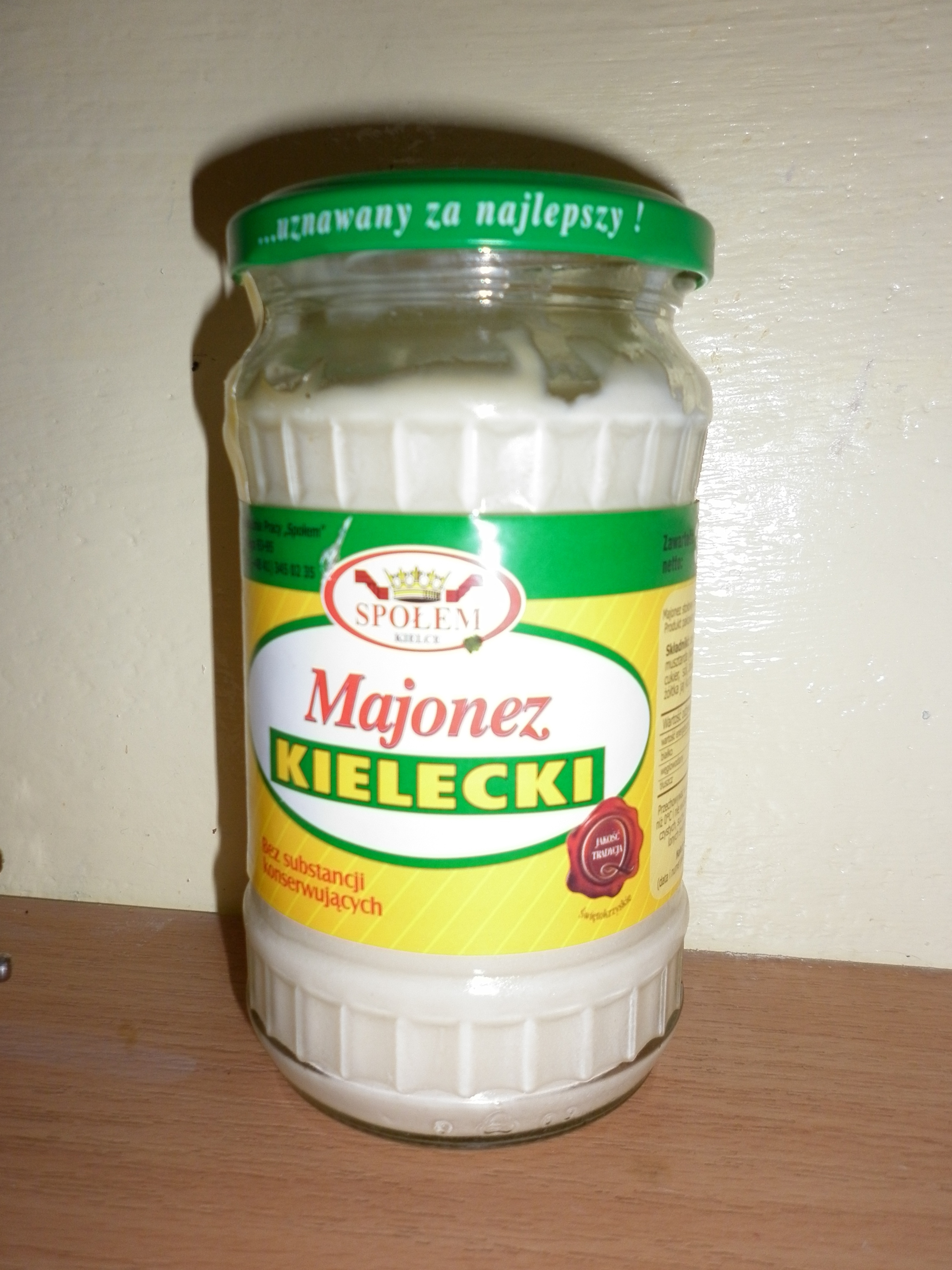
- Product type: Mayonnaise
- Current owner: Wytwórcza Spółdzielnia Pracy "Społem"
- Country: Kielce, Poland
- Introduced: 1959; 67 years ago
- Website: majonez.pl

Kielecki Mayonnaise (Polish: Majonez Kielecki) is a Polish mayonnaise brand produced by Wytwórcza Spółdzielnia Pracy "Społem" in Kielce. First sold in 1959, it was the first mayonnaise produced in Poland on an industrial scale.

== History ==
Kielecki Mayonnaise was invented by Zbigniew Zamojski and Janusz Cichocki in 1958 and began production in 1959, originally under the name Stołowy. It is exported to 18 countries spanning four continents, including the United States, the United Kingdom, Australia, Germany, Greece, Russia, the Czech Republic, Slovakia, Romania, Kazakhstan, Azerbaijan, and Turkmenistan. In the United States, it is most popular in Chicago because of its large Polish-American population.

In 2019, Rzeczpospolita estimated that the Kielecki Mayonnaise brand is worth over 40 million złoty.

== See also ==
- List of mayonnaises
