= Vuelvealavida =

Venezuelan seafood cocktail

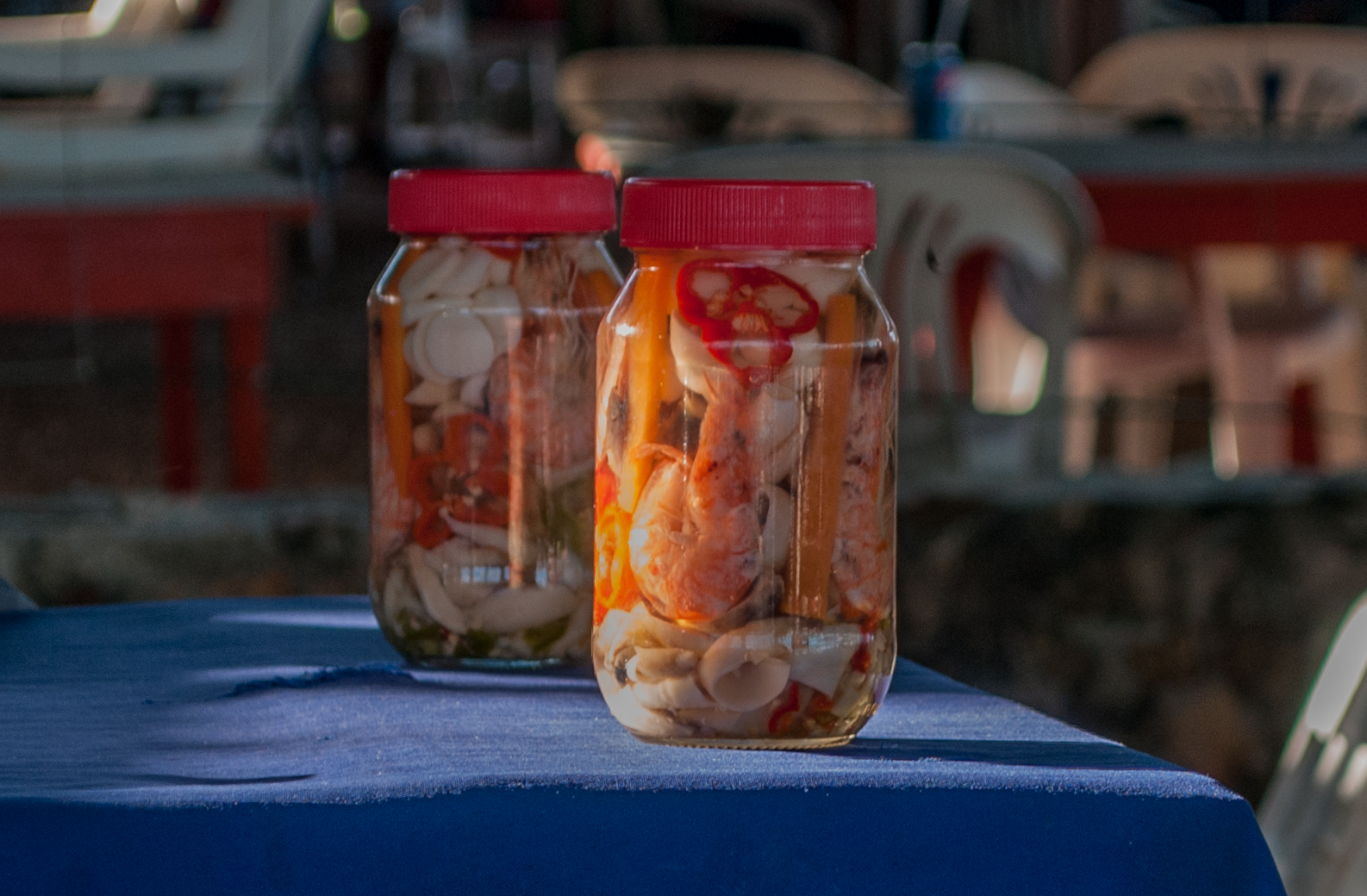
An example of a rompecolchón

Vuelvealavida, Rompecolchón, or Siete Potencias (Back into Life, Mattress-breaker and Seven Powers) are names given to various seafood cocktails in Venezuela. These cocktails are believed, perhaps apocryphally, to serve as a stimulant and aphrodisiac.. This has not been confirmed by science. These cocktails are commonly sold on Venezuelan beaches.
