= Remoulade =

Mayonnaise-based cold sauce

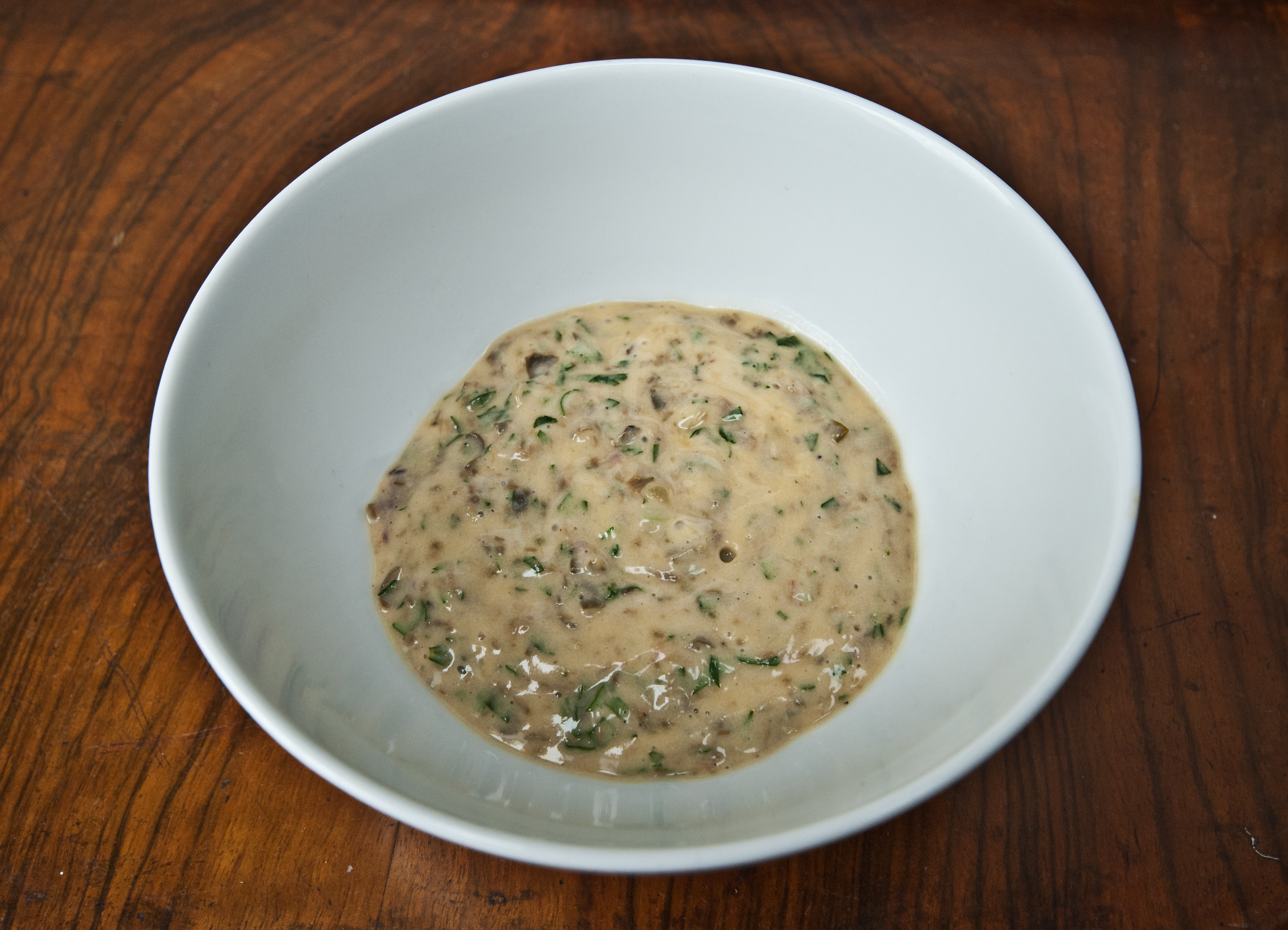
- Type: Condiment
- Place of origin: France
- Region or state: Worldwide

Remoulade (English: /reɪməˈlɑːd/; French: [ʁemulad]; Occitan: salsa remolada) is a cold sauce. Although similar to tartar sauce, it is often more yellowish, sometimes flavored with curry, and often contains chopped pickles or piccalilli. It can also contain horseradish, paprika, anchovies, capers and a host of other condiments.

It is often used as a condiment or dipping sauce, primarily for sole, plaice, and seafood cakes (such as crab or salmon cakes) but also served with meats.

== Varieties ==
=== Sauce remoulade ===
In French cuisine, remoulade is a derivative of mayonnaise, with the addition of mixed herbs (parsley, chives, chervil and tarragon), capers, diced cornichons and, optionally, some anchovy essence or chopped anchovies.

The sauce is made from mayonnaise with vinegar, mustard, shallots, capers, chopped pickles, and/or fresh herbs (chives, tarragon, chervil, burnet). It is commonly served as céleri remoulade, a mustard-flavored remoulade variation with shredded raw celeriac. Often it is served as a condiment for red meats, fish, and shellfish.

The remoulade used in céleri-rave remoulade is different: it is based on a simple mustard-flavoured vinegar and oil dressing spiced with salt, pepper, and chopped green herbs.

=== Louisiana remoulade ===
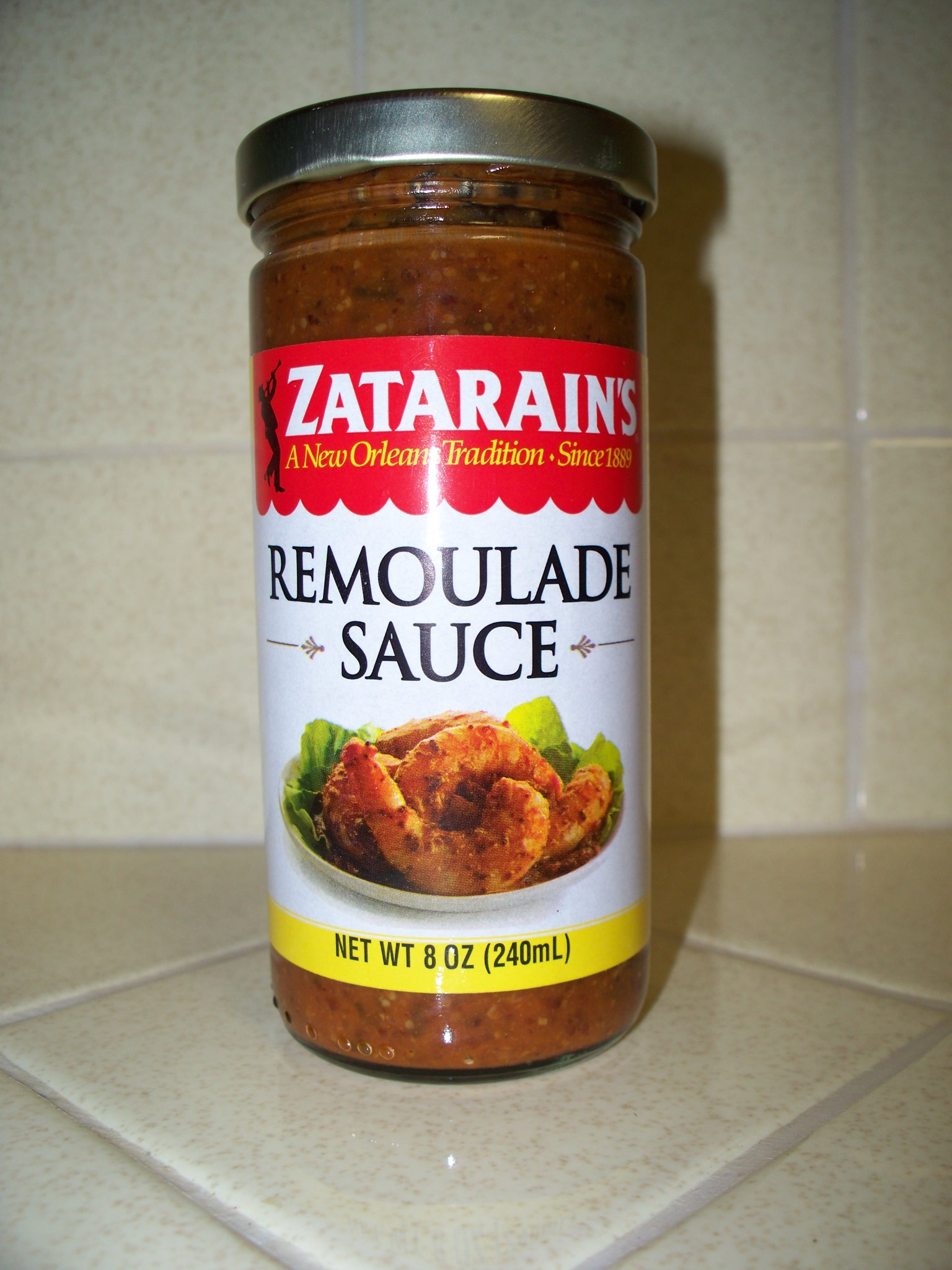
Louisiana-style remoulade sauce made by Zatarain's

In Louisiana Creole cuisine, remoulade tends to have a tannish or pink tint due to the use of Creole mustard, small amounts of ketchup, cayenne pepper, and paprika.

Louisiana remoulade styles include French-African Creole, Afro-Caribbean Creole, and Cajun; like local variants of roux, each is different from the French original.

Creole versions often have tan or pink hues and are usually piquant.

Each version may have finely chopped vegetables, usually green onions, celery, and parsley; most are made with either Creole mustard or stone-ground mustard. Salt, black pepper, and cayenne pepper are also standard ingredients.

In the oil- and mayonnaise-based versions, the reddish hue often comes from the addition of a small amount of ketchup or paprika.

The sauce is often topped with paprika for the aesthetics as well as the flavor. Generally, lemon juice or vinegar are added for acidity. Other additions include hard-boiled egg or raw egg yolks, minced garlic, hot sauce, vinegar, horseradish, capers, cornichons, and Worcestershire sauce.

Today, shrimp remoulade is a common cold appetizer in New Orleans Creole restaurants, although, historically, hard-boiled eggs with remoulade were a less expensive option on some menus.

Shrimp remoulade is most often served as a stand-alone appetizer (usually on a chiffonade of iceberg lettuce). One might also see crawfish remoulade, but restaurants seldom offer remoulade sauce as an accompaniment with fish, where cocktail sauce and tartar sauce are generally preferred. However, food columnist and cookbook author Leon Soniat suggests serving remoulade "over seafood or with sliced asparagus."

=== Iceland ===
Remúlaði is a condiment commonly served with fried fish and on hot dogs, together with mustard, ketchup, and raw and fried onions.

== See also ==
- Cuisine of Denmark
- Cuisine of France
- List of dips
- List of sauces
- Russian dressing
- Thousand Island dressing
