= Fry sauce =

Condiment for French fries

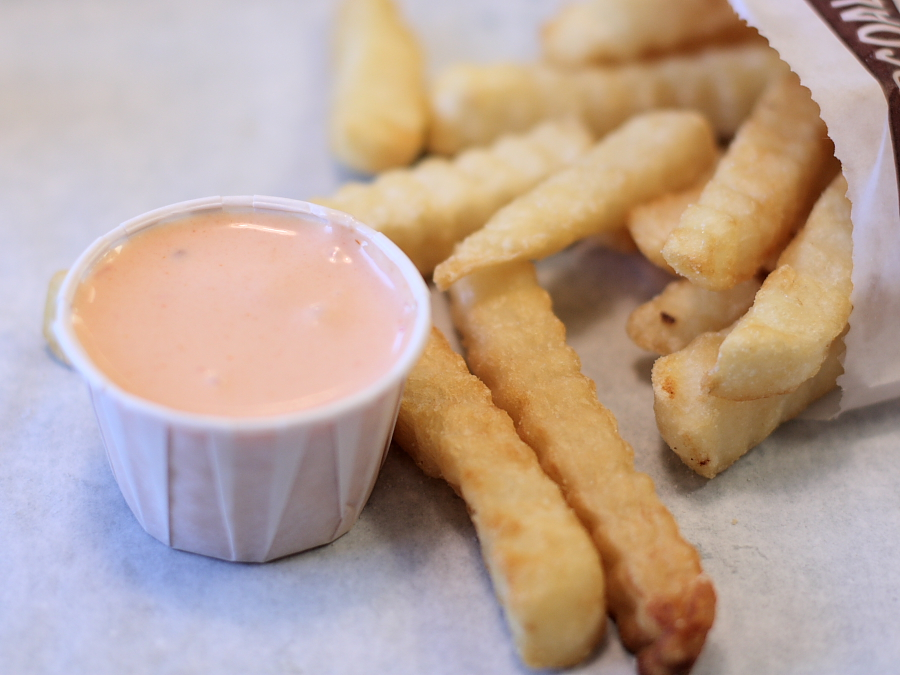
- Fry sauce with fries
- Type: Sauce
- Place of origin: United States
- Region or state: Utah
- Main ingredients: Ketchup, mayonnaise, mustard

Fry sauce is a condiment often served with French fries or other food in many places in the world. It is a combination of tomato ketchup and mayonnaise.

== United States ==
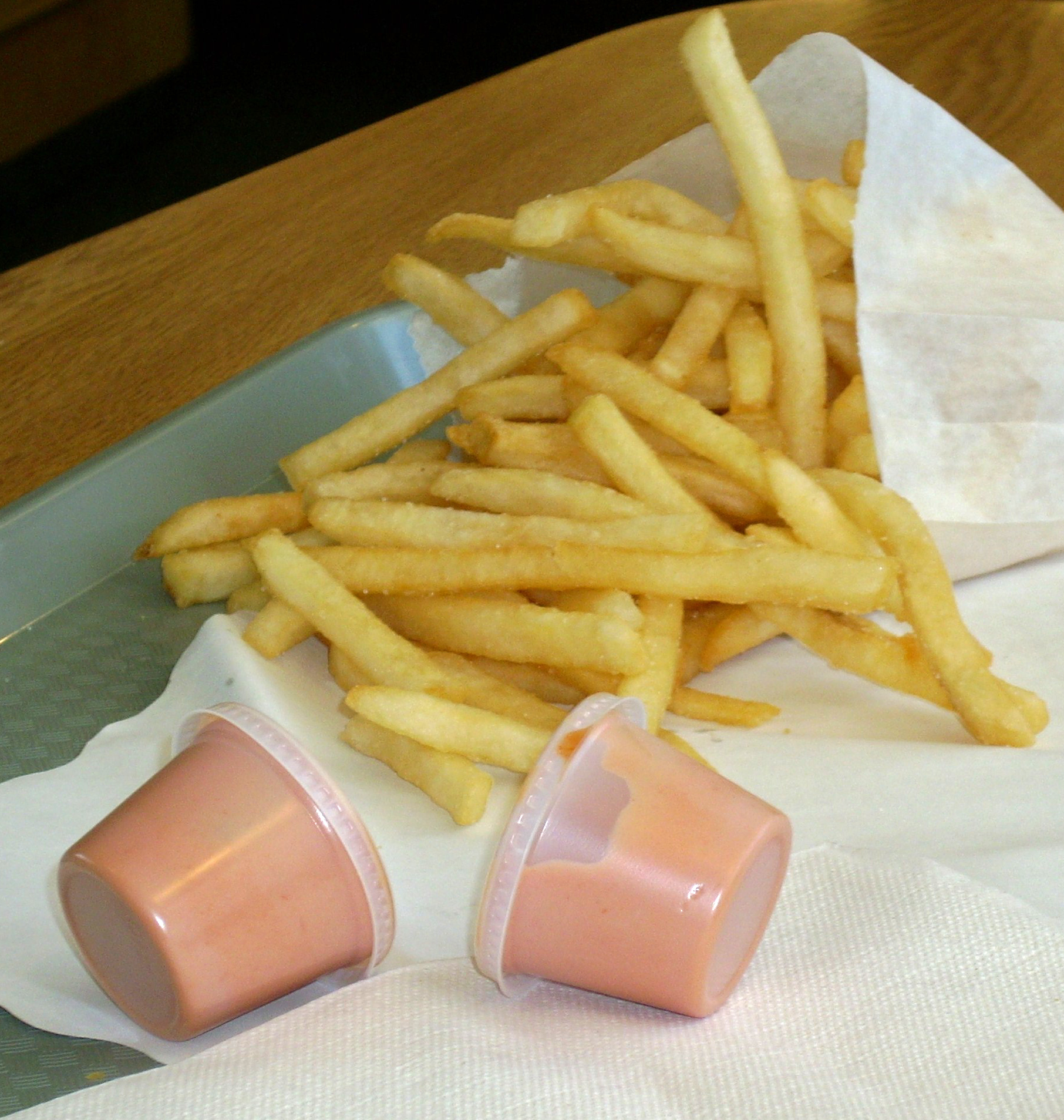
Fry sauce in sealed plastic cups with fries on a tray in Utah

Fry sauce was popularized in Utah. Although sauce made of a mixture of equal parts ketchup and mayonnaise appears in a New Orleans cookbook published in 1900, the Utah origin is when Don Carlos Edwards used a pink sauce at his restaurant, Don Carlos Barbecue, sometime between 1941 and 1943. Edwards also used the pink sauce at the first Arctic Circle restaurant in Salt Lake City, Utah, which opened in 1950. The "pink sauce", later became known as fry sauce. In his essay on Utah fry sauce, Michael P. Christensen noted that fry sauce "functions as a cultural identifier for Utahns." The Arctic Circle chain still serves fry sauce in its western United States restaurants.

In April 2018, Heinz announced the release of "Mayochup", a mixture of mayonnaise and ketchup, because 500,000+ users voted "yes" in a Twitter poll asking Americans if they wanted to see it in stores. A number of Twitter users responded that such a mixture already existed as "fry sauce" and "fancy sauce". The sauce arrived at U.S. retailers' shelves in September 2018.

The sauce is similar to Yum Yum sauce, which is popular in Japanese steakhouses in America.

== South America ==
In Argentina and Uruguay, a similar condiment known as salsa golf (golf sauce) is a popular dressing for fries, burgers, steak sandwiches, and seafood salads. According to tradition, the sauce was invented by Luis Federico Leloir, a Nobel laureate and restaurant patron, at a golf club in Mar del Plata, Argentina, during the mid-1920s.

== France ==
In France, many Turkish restaurants and fast food establishments serve fry sauce and call it sauce cocktail; it is also common for customers to request ketchup-mayo (a dab of mayonnaise and a dab of ketchup) alongside their French fries at such places. Both sauce cocktail and the Thousand Island dressing-like sauce cocktail can often be found in supermarkets.

== Germany ==
In Germany, a popular product called Rot Weiß (red white) is sold in toothpaste-style tubes; it consists of unmixed ketchup and mayonnaise, which form a red-and-white striped string when squeezed out. Fries at restaurants are sometimes served with an equal mixture of ketchup and mayonnaise. This style of serving is often called Pommes Rot-Weiß or, colloquially Pommes Schranke (barrier gate) due to the red-and-white coloration of those. Pommes-Soße or Frittensoße (fry sauce) is a lightly spiced mayonnaise similar to the Dutch Fritessaus. A condiment similar to the American fry sauce is known as Cocktailsoße, but it is more often used for döner kebab than for French fries.

== Iceland ==
In Iceland, a condiment similar to fry sauce called Kokteilsósa (cocktail sauce) is popular.

== Philippines ==
In the Philippines, a similar sauce is made by combining mayonnaise and banana ketchup. It is commonly used as a dipping sauce for fried food like french fries and cheese sticks (deep fried cheese wrapped in lumpia wrapper) but also for appetizers like lumpia.

== United Kingdom ==
In the United Kingdom, this sauce is known as "burger sauce", and is served premixed, or separate, but together, similar to the Turkish ketchup-mayo. The ketchup is put in the container followed by the mayonnaise, and is mixed by hand by the consumer, using the desired foodstuffs to mix them together as it is dipped. It also, unlike fry sauce, typically contains diced gherkins as an ingredient. Marie Rose sauce, which usually also includes Worcestershire sauce, lemon juice, and black pepper, is sometimes made identically.

== Puerto Rico ==
In Puerto Rico, mayokétchup is widely used with tostones, sandwiches, burgers, and fried foods. It is made of equal parts of mayonnaise and ketchup with the addition of garlic.

== Japan ==
In Japan, this sauce is known as "aurora sauce". It is different from the sauce of the same name used in French cuisine.

== Russia ==
In Russia, the mixture of ketchup and mayonnaise is known as "ketchunez". In 2019, the local Heinz division launched a sauce with this name.

== See also ==
- Comeback sauce
- French fries § Accompaniments
- Fritessaus
- List of dips
- List of sauces
- Marie Rose sauce
- Mayochup
- Pink Sauce
- Remoulade
- Russian dressing
- Secret sauce
- Special sauce
- Thousand Island dressing
- Yum yum sauce
- Salsa golf
- Big Mac sauce
