= Cocktail sauce =

Condiment served usually with seafoods

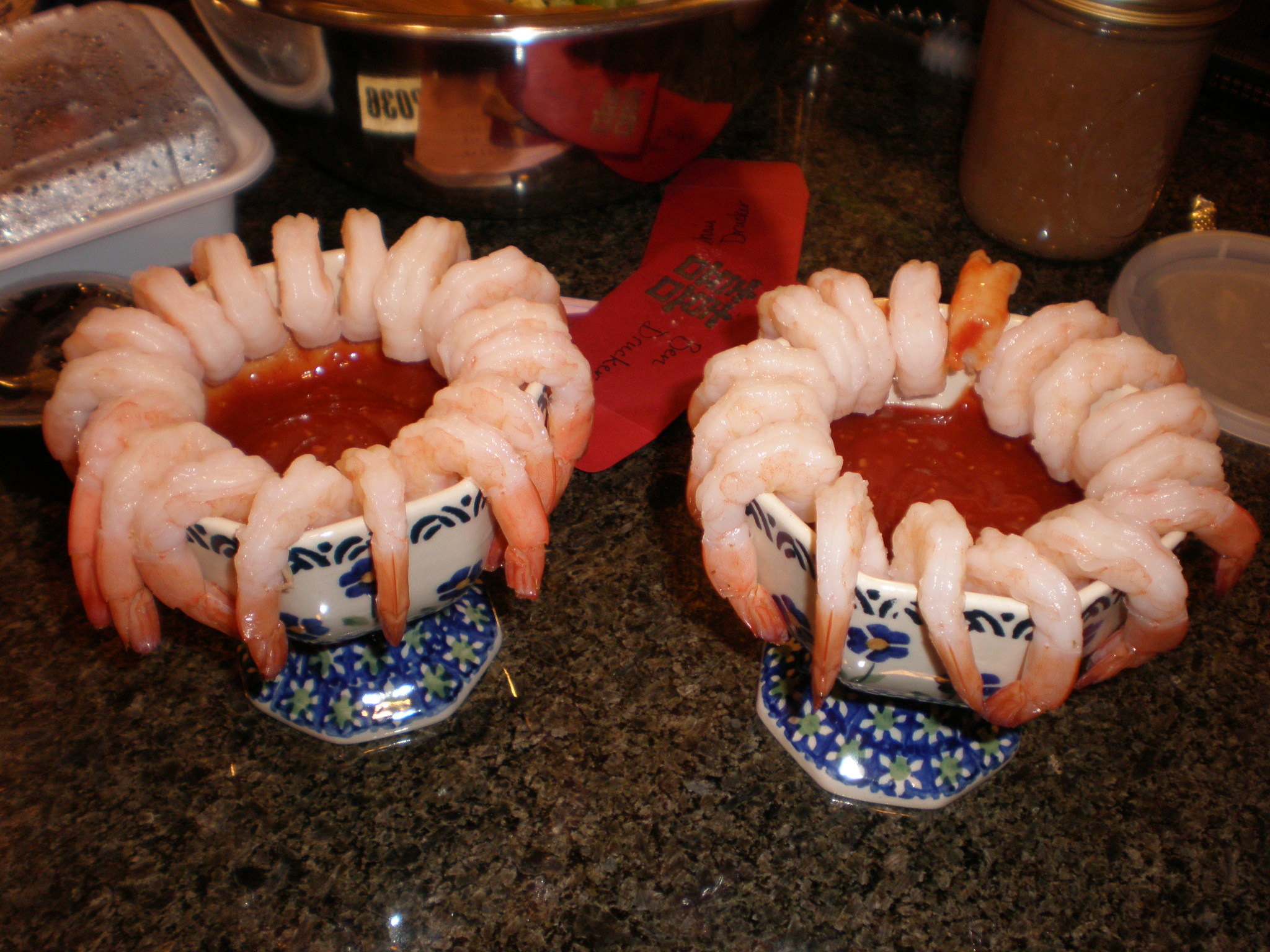
- Two servings of shrimp cocktail with cocktail sauce
- Type: Sauce
- Course: Appetizer
- Place of origin: United States of America
- Region or state: San Francisco, California, USA
- Invented: 1860's
- Serving temperature: Cold
- Main ingredients: Ketchup or chili sauce mixed with prepared horseradish
- Ingredients generally used: Lemon juice, Worcestershire sauce and Tabasco sauce

Cocktail sauce, also known as seafood sauce, is a cold or room temperature sauce served with seafood cocktail or as a condiment with other seafoods. Seafood with such spiced, cold sauces was common in 19th and 20th century American cuisine.

== Origin ==
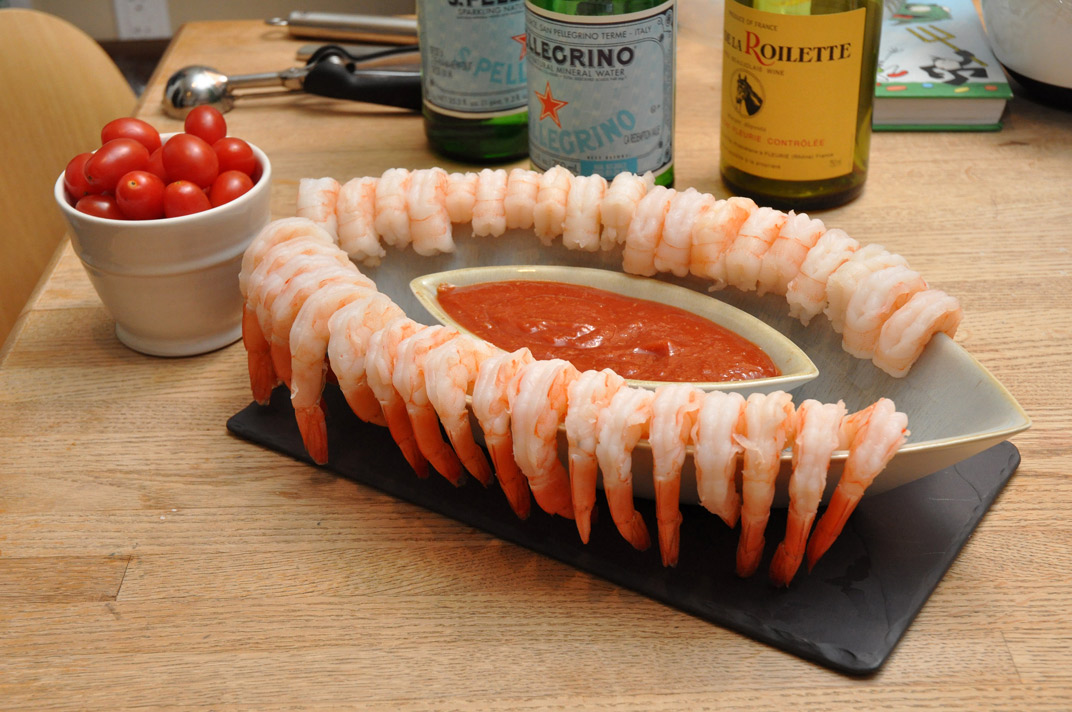
A shrimp cocktail served with cocktail sauce

=== Seafood cocktail ===
Seafood cocktails originated in the 19th century (1800s) in the United States of America in the saloons of the San Francisco Bay Area of California during the California Gold Rush era. Recipes for a cocktail sauce composed of ketchup, horseradish, and Tabasco sauce were documented as early as the 1860s-1880s on the U.S. West Coast. An 1889 article published in the Chicago Tribune newspaper reprinted an article from the New York Sun newspaper about a man from San Francisco who was at the famed Manhattan steakhouse Delmonico's and was teaching his fellow diners how to construct an "oyster cocktail." These seafood cocktails were usually made with oysters as they were cheap and plentiful for gold miners to enjoy with their alcoholic beverages, but when the oyster supply dwindled due to over harvesting, shrimp became the new favorite option. In 1919, Victor Hirtzler established the first standardized, printed version of the recipe, in The Hotel St. Francis Cook Book.

The traditional American sauce combines ketchup or chili sauce with prepared horseradish, Worcestershire sauce, lemon juice, and Tabasco sauce. Shrimp cocktail gained popularity in the 1920s as a way for bars to repurpose their cocktail glasses during Prohibition, and became popular again in the late 1950s and 1960s in the luxurious casinos of Las Vegas, Nevada. While cocktail sauce is most associated with the shrimp cocktail, it can be served with any fish or seafood. Cocktail sauce can also be used as an ingredient in other condiments, sauces, and dishes. It is sometimes an ingredient in Louisiana-style remoulade sauce, which may be used to dress shrimp dishes or oyster po'boy sandwiches, and it is creamy, red-hued, and zesty, resembling a mix of tartar sauce and cocktail sauce.

== Varieties ==
=== North America ===
In the United States and Canada it generally consists of, at a minimum, ketchup or chili sauce mixed with prepared horseradish. Unlike cocktail sauces elsewhere, mayonnaise is not used in the North American style. Lemon juice, Worcestershire sauce and Tabasco sauce are common additives, often all three.

=== Elsewhere ===
The common form of cocktail sauce in the United Kingdom, Ireland, Iceland, France, Belgium, Italy and The Netherlands, usually consists of mayonnaise mixed with a tomato sauce to the same pink colour as prawns, producing a result that could be compared to fry sauce. It is similar to Thousand Island dressing, but the more usual British name is Marie (or Mary) Rose Sauce. The origins of the name are unclear and it is inaccurately credited to various sources, including a 1980s dive team cook working at the site of the Tudor ship the Mary Rose, and Fanny Cradock. However, the term first appeared in the 1920s as a term for a garnish of shrimp, and was in use for cocktail sauce by at least 1963. The name was linked to the colour and Escoffier uses it to describe a pink iced pudding. It was so ubiquitous in the 1960s and 1970s that it has since become something of a joke in Britain, along with its most commonly associated dish, the prawn cocktail.

In Belgium, a dash of whisky is often added to the sauce. It is popularly served with steamed shrimp and seafood on the half shell.

In Australia, it is often provided in fish and chip shops.

== In oyster bars ==
In most American oyster bars, cocktail sauce is the standard accompaniment for raw oysters and patrons at an oyster bar expect to be able to mix their own. The standard ingredients (in roughly decreasing proportion) are ketchup, horseradish, hot sauce (e.g., Tabasco, Louisiana, or Crystal), Worcestershire sauce, and lemon juice. A soufflé cup is usually set in the middle of the platter of oysters along with a cocktail fork and a lemon slice.

== See also ==
- Court-bouillon
- List of dips
- List of sauces
- Squid cocktail
