= French dressing =

American salad dressing

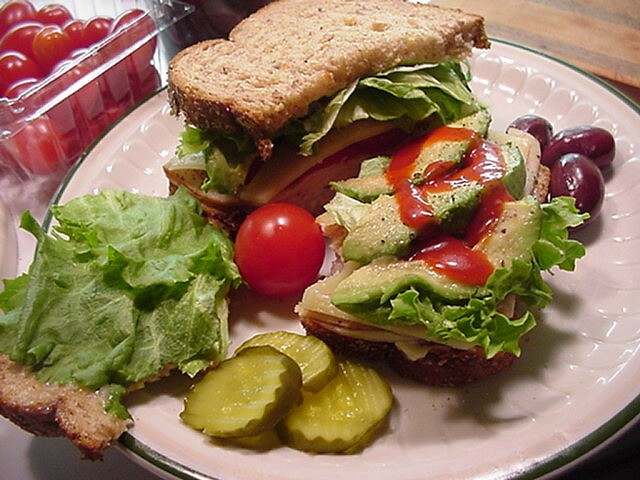
- A sandwich topped with Catalina-style French dressing
- Type: Salad dressing
- Place of origin: United States
- Main ingredients: Oil, vinegar, sugar, tomatoes, paprika

USA style French dressing is a creamy salad dressing in American cuisine based upon oil, vinegar, tomato, sugar, and other often finely chopped ingredients. Its composition was once regulated by the United States federal government, which withdrew its standard of identity in 2022. A variant in Canada omits tomato and adds mustard.

== Description ==
French dressing is made of oil, vinegar, sugar, and other flavorings, with the coloring derived from tomato and often paprika. It exists on a spectrum between Russian and Catalina dressing, and from pale orangish colored and creamy to bright red and less creamy in its Catalina variant. Some diners on the Mississippi Gulf Coast were known to dip pizza in Catalina French dressing.

Common brands of French dressing in the United States include Annie's, Bernstein's, Dorothy Lynch, Heinz, Ken's, Kraft, Newman's Own, Marzetti, and Wish-Bone.

== History ==
In the nineteenth century, French dressing was synonymous with vinaigrette, which is still the definition used by the American professional culinary industry and in other parts of the world such as Australia, New Zealand and parts of Europe and South America. Starting in the early twentieth century, American recipes for French dressing often added other flavorings to the vinaigrette, including paprika, ketchup, Worcestershire sauce, onion juice, sugar, and Tabasco sauce, but kept the name. By the 1920s, bottled French dressing was being sold as "Milani's 1890 French Dressing", but it is not clear whether it included ketchup at the time. The modern version is sweet and colored orange-to-red from the use of paprika and tomatoes.

== Regulation ==
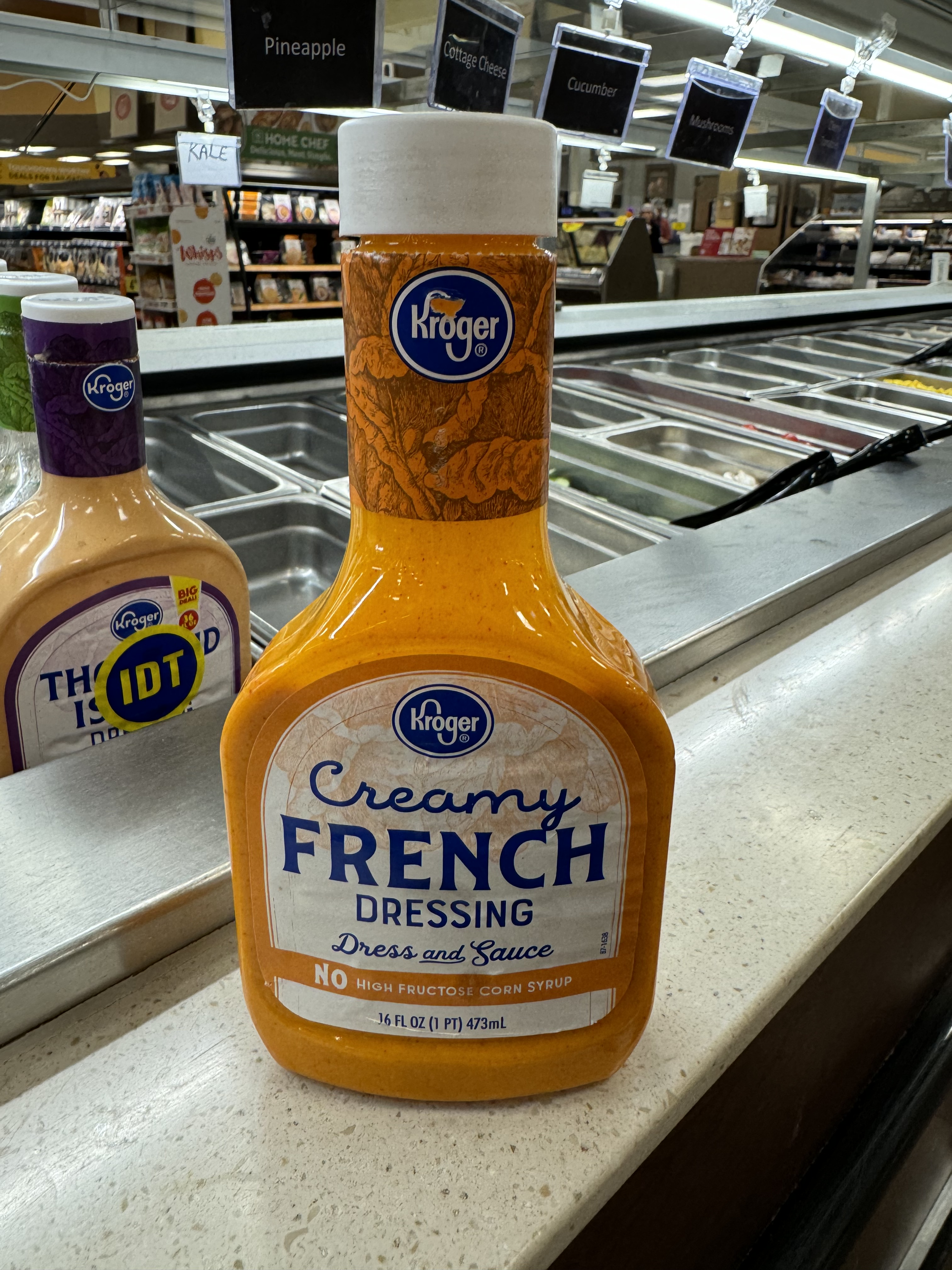
Kroger creamy French dressing at a Kroger salad bar in Indianapolis, Indiana.

In the United States, French dressing was regulated by federal standards. Between 1950 and 2022, the Food and Drug Administration (FDA) regulated French dressing to a standard with strict requirements of vegetable oil, vinegar, lemon or lime juice, salt, sugar, tomato paste or puree, and selected spices. On January 12, 2022, the FDA revoked the standard of identity and in the U.S. the ingredients can be at the choice of the manufacturer.

In Canada, the Food and Drug Regulations of the Foods and Drugs Act state that French dressing must be prepared using a combination of vegetable oil and vinegar or lemon juice and the final product must contain at least 35 percent vegetable oil.

== See also ==
- Thousand Island dressing
- Italian dressing
