= Salad dressing =

Condiment for salads

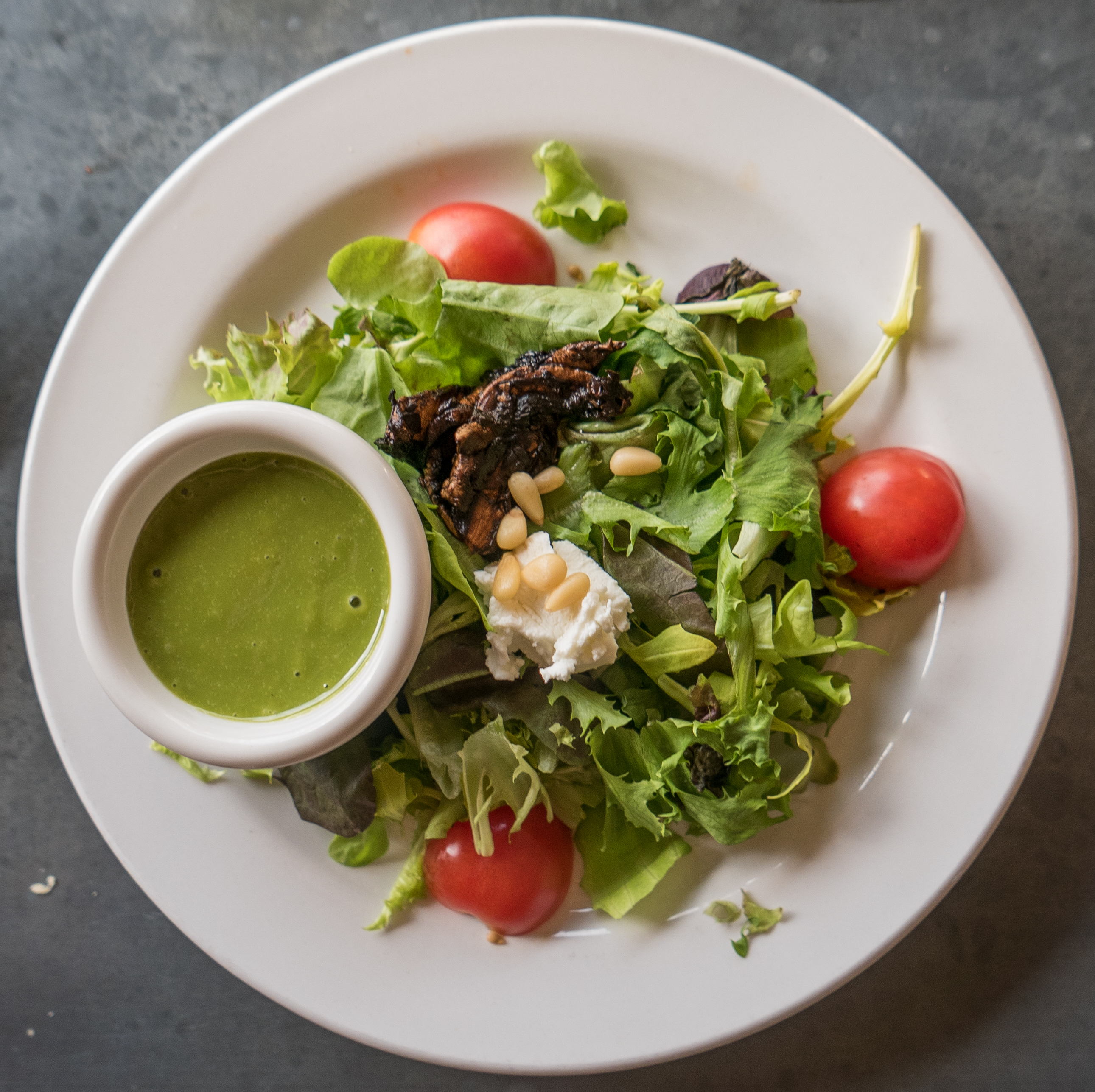
A salad served with a ramekin of dressing

A salad dressing is a sauce for salads, especially leafy salads.

== Types ==
Dressings may also be used in preparing salads of beans (e.g., three bean salad), noodle or pasta salads and antipasti, and forms of potato salad. A dressing may even be made for fruit salads. Salad dressings can be drizzled over a salad, added and tossed with the ingredients, or offered "on the side". The functionality of some of these sauces has been extended, meaning they can be served as a dip (as with crudités or chicken wings). In Western culture, there are two basic types of salad dressing:

- Vinaigrettes based on a mixture (emulsion) of olive or salad oil and vinegar, and variously flavored with herbs, spices, salt, pepper, sugar, and other ingredients, such as poppy seeds or ground Parmesan cheese.
- Creamy dressings, usually based on mayonnaise or fermented milk products, such as yogurt, sour cream (crème fraîche, smetana) or buttermilk.

In the United States, buttermilk-based ranch dressing is the most popular, with vinaigrettes and Caesar-style dressing following close behind.

=== List ===
Some salad dressings include:

- Balsamic vinaigrette
- Blue cheese
- Boiled
- Caesar
- French
- Ginger
- Green goddess
- Italian
- Louis
- Mayfair
- Honey mustard
- Peanut sauce
- Ranch
- Russian
- Salad cream
- Tahini dressing
- Thousand Island
- Wafu

== See also ==
- List of salads
