= Marie Rose sauce =

British condiment

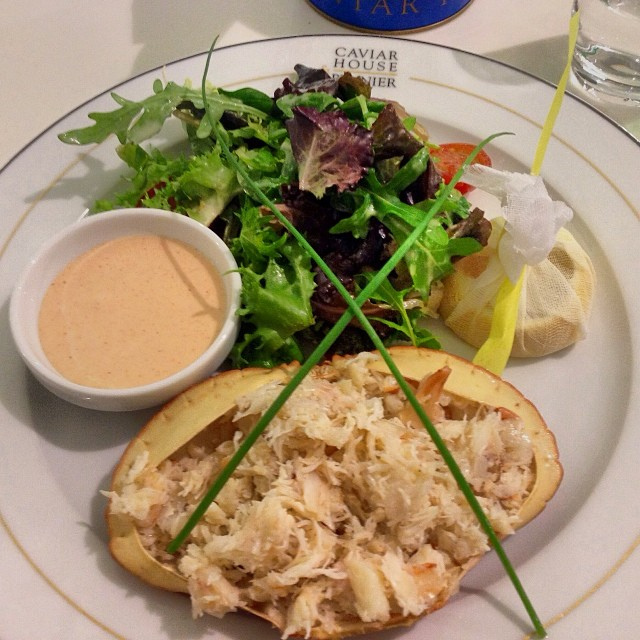
- Crab meat in shell with salad and Marie Rose sauce
- Type: Condiment
- Place of origin: United Kingdom
- Serving temperature: cold
- Main ingredients: Tomatoes, mayonnaise, Worcestershire sauce, lemon juice and pepper
- Variations: ketchup

Marie Rose sauce (known in some areas as cocktail sauce or seafood sauce) is a British condiment often made from a blend of tomatoes, mayonnaise, Worcestershire sauce, lemon juice and black pepper. A simpler version can be made by merely mixing tomato ketchup with mayonnaise. The sauce was popularised in the 1960s by Fanny Cradock, a British cook.

It is often used to accompany seafood, prawns in particular.

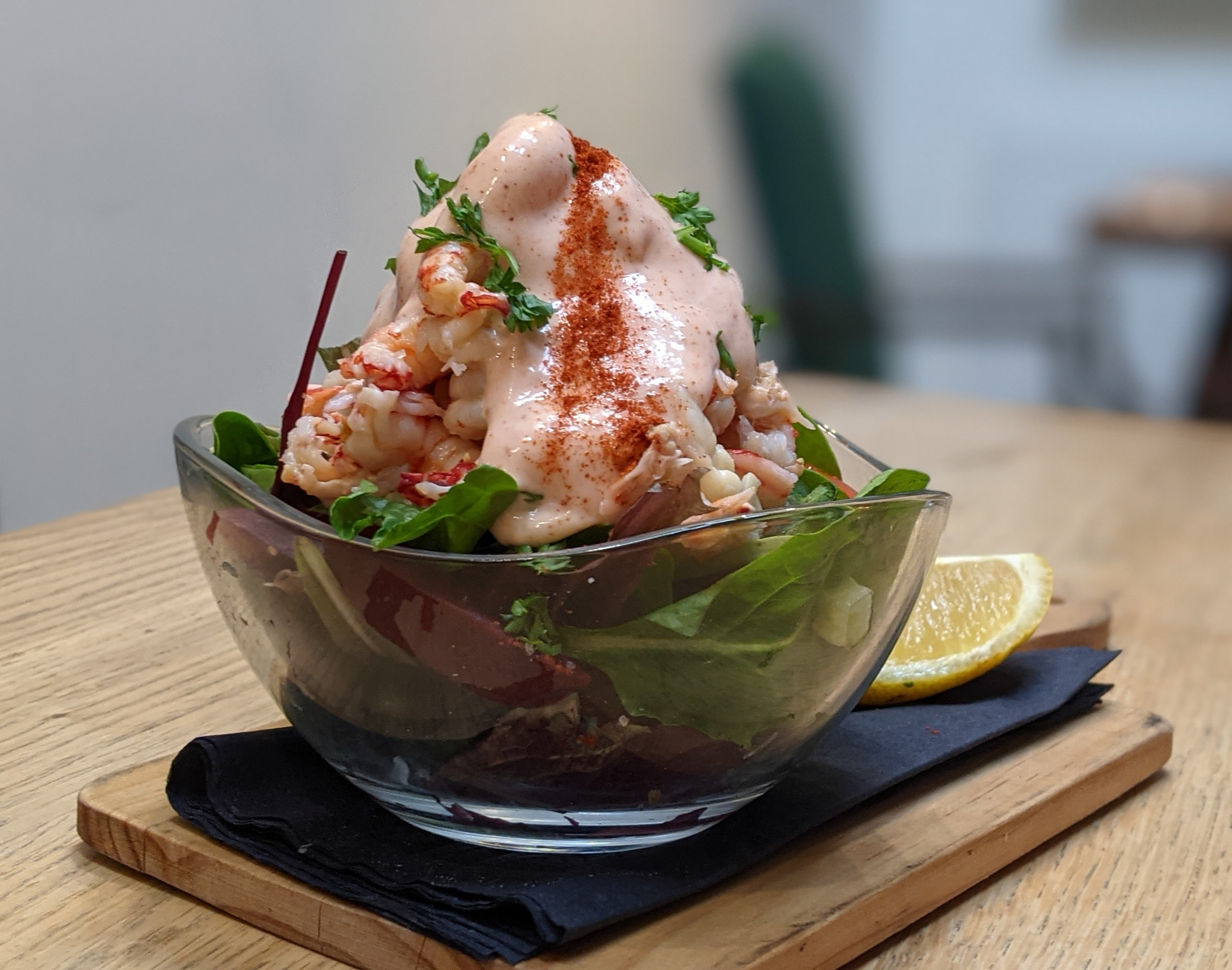
Crayfish cocktail with Marie Rose sauce, served in a glass bowl

== Origins ==
The sauce is often credited to Fanny Cradock, who made it widely known. Variations exist internationally, and seafood cocktail sauces predate Cradock's 1967 recipe by some years. For example, in 1956, Constance Spry published a recipe for Tomato Ice, a chilled mixture of mayonnaise and sweetened tomato pulp, for use as the base of a prawn cocktail.

The American cocktail sauce is a horseradish and ketchup-based sauce that is served with seafood, and dates back considerably earlier. Although this is not the same sauce as Marie Rose, it is served in the same distinctive style in a prawn or shrimp cocktail, and it has been incorrectly suggested that US cocktail sauce, made milder for British tastes, was the precursor of Marie Rose sauce.

The connection with the name Marie Rose is also not clear. Cradock is sometimes credited with coining the name, and there is a popular legend that the sauce was named after the Tudor navy warship Mary Rose. However, the Mary Rose Trust itself has debunked this, saying "As we still have a number of divers on our team who were around during this period, so we can ask them. Not one of them has any recollection of this happening... since the Mary Rose was in the news a lot during this period, it becomes clear that some people did the sums and came up with a nice story to justify the result."

== Similar sauces ==
=== Argentina ===
In Argentina, salsa golf is a similar sauce created in the 1920s at a golf course, hence the name.

=== United States ===
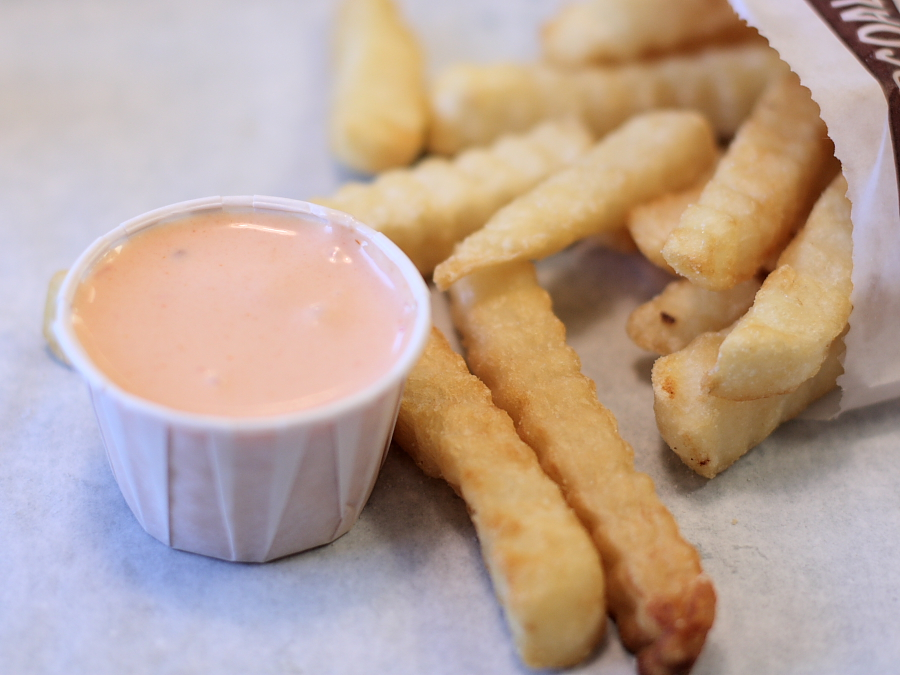
Fry sauce, similar in composition and appearance to simplified Marie Rose sauce (no Worcestershire sauce, lemon, or black pepper) served with french fries in the United States

In the United States, a similar sauce, fry sauce, is sometimes served with french fries. A related sauce and dressing called Thousand Island dressing is popular in the United States and Canada. The Thousand Island dressing recipe reputedly originated from the Thousand Islands between the state of New York and the province of Ontario. Russian dressing is also similar, with mayonnaise, ketchup, horseradish, and other ingredients.

=== South Korea ===
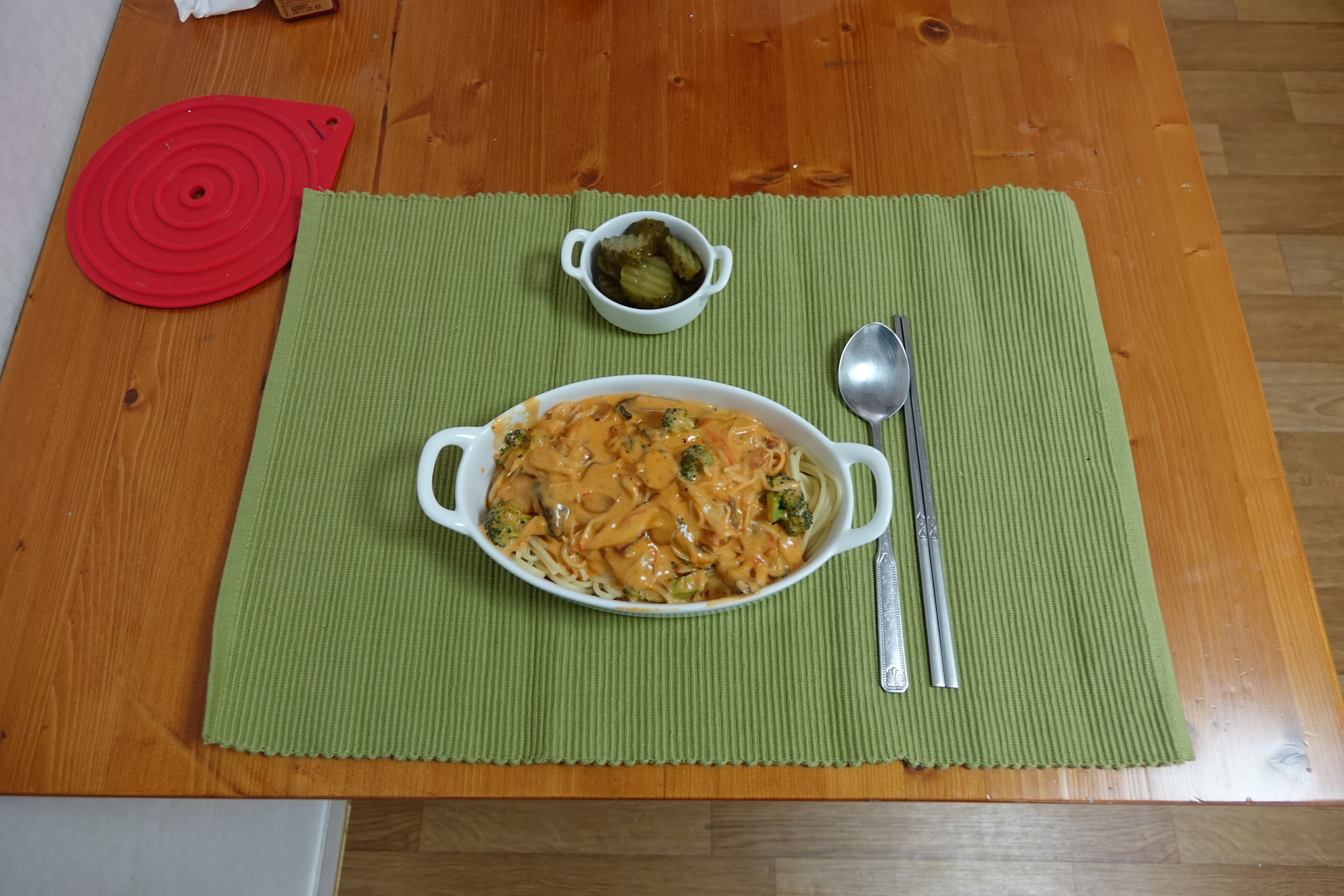
Rosé sauce pasta

Rosé sauce is a mixture of tomato sauce and cream sauce. It is named after the French word 'rosé' because of its pink color.

In Korea, rosé sauce is often made with gochujang, resulting in a sweet, spicy, and rich flavor.

== See also ==
- List of dips
- Pink sauce
- List of sauces

== Sources ==
- Marie Rose sauce recipe
- BBC - recipe includes a description of Marie Rose sauce
