= Russian dressing =

American salad dressing

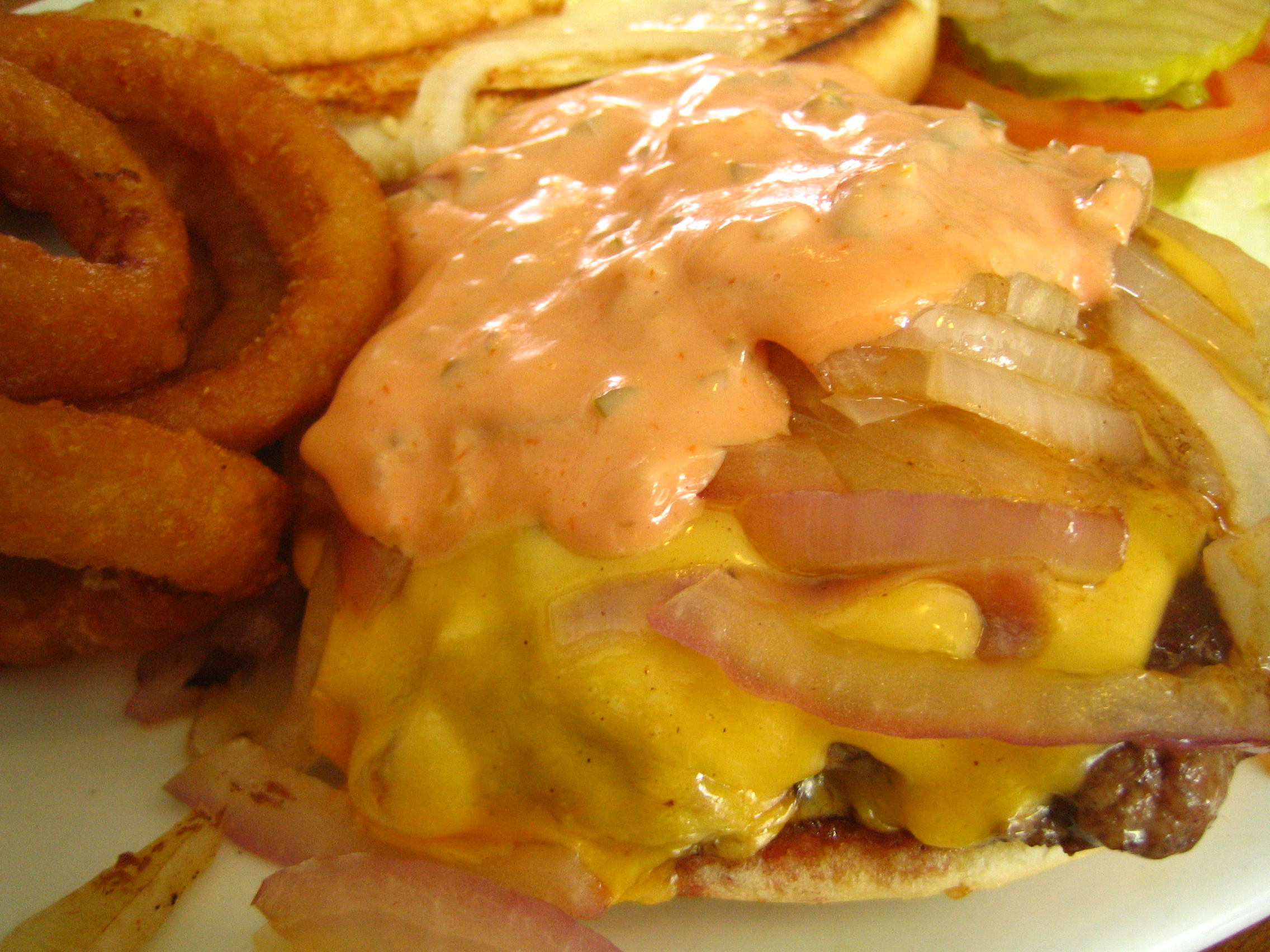
- Cheeseburger topped with Russian dressing
- Type: Salad dressing or condiment
- Place of origin: United States
- Region or state: New Hampshire
- Created by: James E. Colburn
- Main ingredients: Mayonnaise, ketchup, horseradish, pimentos, chives, spices

Russian dressing is an American salad dressing consisting of mayonnaise and ketchup complemented with additional ingredients, such as horseradish, pimentos, chives, mustard, and spices.

== History ==
Russian dressing is mentioned as early as 1900 in U.S. sources. It is also documented in a 1910 catering book as an alternative to vinaigrette for dressing tomatoes or asparagus. A 1913 cookbook has a recipe which is a vinaigrette with paprika and mustard. A mayonnaise-based recipe is documented in 1914. The condiment came to be called "Russian" since the original recipe included caviar, a staple of Russian cuisine.

Local historians claim that the mayonnaise-based version was invented in Nashua, New Hampshire, by James E. Colburn in the 1910s. A 1927 biographical article calls him "the originator and first producer of that delectable condiment known as Russian salad dressing". Colburn had been selling "Colburn's Mayonnaise salad dressing" at his store since at least 1910.

To have conferred upon the epicurean tastes of a great body of people a delicacy at once as refined as it is permanent in its popularity is not to have lived in vain; rather it is to have added to the joy of living. ... [Colburn] hit upon an assembly of ingredients, which he named Russian salad dressing, ... [and earned] wealth on which he was enabled to retire. ... As he rests on his laurels, he is conscious of having done his part well in conferring a blessing upon the people who have learned the art of eating well.

— Hobart Pillsbury, New Hampshire Resources ...

By 1914, Colburn's company was manufacturing it, and distributing it to retailers and hotels. He earned enough from its sale to retire in 1924.

== Preparation ==
Russian dressing is typically made from a blend of mayonnaise and ketchup complemented with such additional ingredients as horseradish, pimentos, chives, mustard, and spices.

== Uses ==
Besides being used as a salad dressing, Russian dressing is used as a spread for Reuben sandwiches.

== Related sauces ==
In the United States, Russian dressing has largely been supplanted by Thousand Island dressing, which is sweeter and less spicy than Russian.

Other combinations of mayonnaise and ketchup, but without the spicy ingredients, are known as fry sauce or other names, and typically served with French fries or tostones.

In Australia, sauce made from mayonnaise and ketchup is called "cocktail sauce" and is used to dress prawns/shrimp in prawn cocktail.

Tartar sauce has similar ingredients as Russian dressing, but without the ketchup. It is typically served with fried fish.

Marie Rose sauce is similar to Russian dressing, but with different ingredients. It is typically served with seafood.

A variant known as red Russian dressing is very much like Catalina or French dressing.

In Germany and Italy, a similar salad dressing is called "American dressing". Sometimes in Italy it is also called a "burger sauce" or "burger dressing".

In Russia, a similar ketchup-and-mayonnaise sauce is colloquially known as "ketchunez" (Russian: кетчунез).
