= Thousand Island dressing =

North American salad dressing and condiment

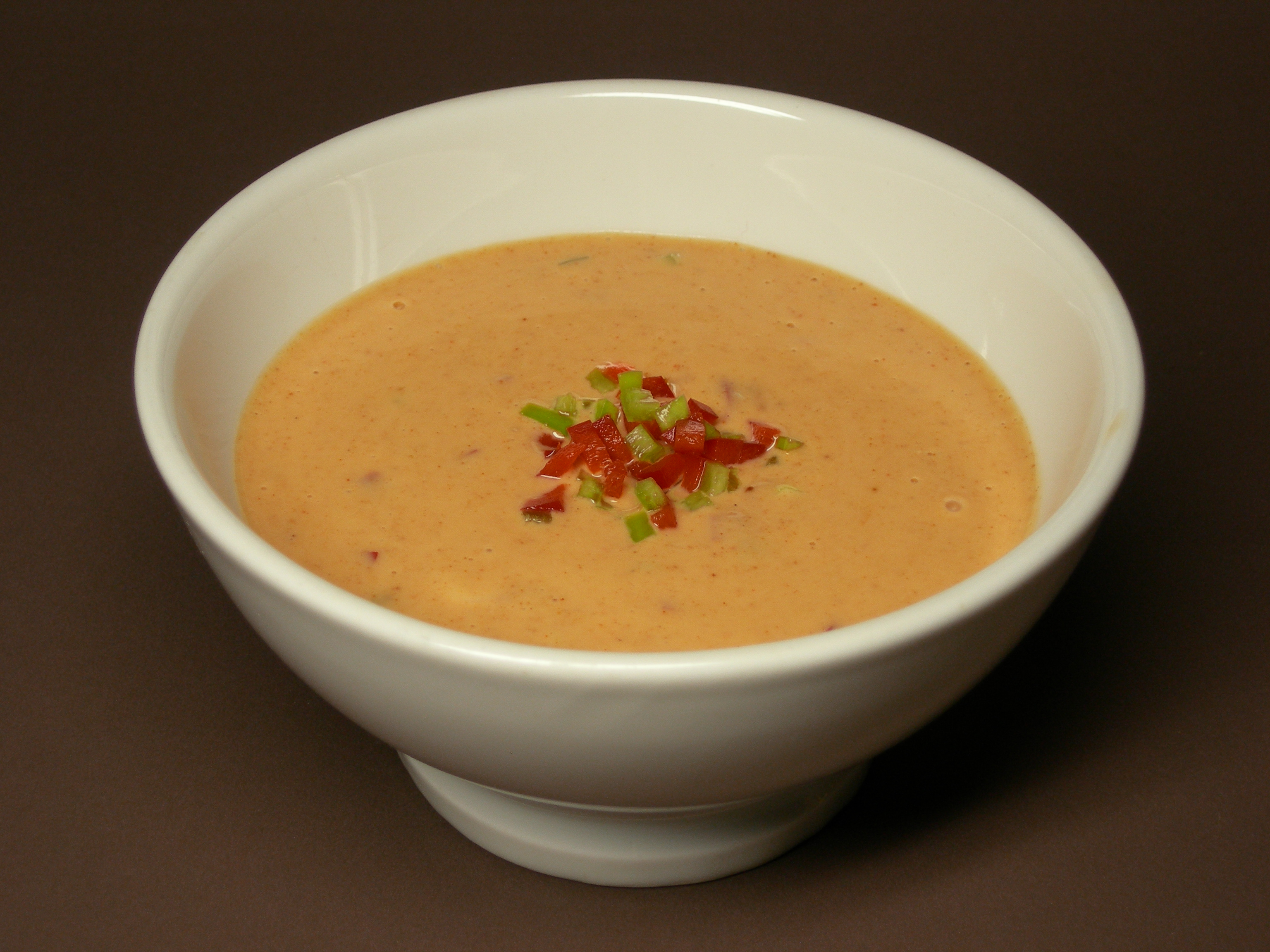
- Type: Salad dressing or condiment
- Region or state: Thousand Islands
- Main ingredients: Mayonnaise, tomato purée or ketchup, pickles
- Food energy (per serving): 370 calories per 100g / 111 per 2 tablespoons (30g)

Thousand Island dressing is a creamy salad dressing and condiment made from a base of mayonnaise and usually ketchup or tomato purée and chopped pickles, and typically including a variety of other ingredients. It was initially popularized in the Thousand Islands region of the upper Saint Lawrence River spanning New York and Canada. Historically a salad dressing, it has been widely adopted by fast food chains as a "special" or "secret" sauce of their own variation based on the Thousand Island recipe.

== History ==
The origin of Thousand Island dressing's name is unknown. Considerable historic and anecdotal evidence suggests it may hail from the Thousand Islands region along the upper St. Lawrence River between the United States and Canada. Within that region, one common version of the dressing's origin maintains that a Clayton, New York, fishing guide's wife, Sophia LaLonde, made the condiment as part of her husband George's shore dinner. Often in this version, actress May Irwin requested the recipe after enjoying it. Irwin, in turn, gave it to another. In another version of the story, George Boldt, who summered in the Thousand Islands, built Boldt Castle between 1900 and 1904, and was proprietor of the Waldorf-Astoria Hotel, instructed the hotel's maître d'hôtel, Oscar Tschirky, to put the dressing on the menu in 1894 after he forgot dressing on salads and improvised with ingredients on hand at the time. According to a 1959 National Geographic article, "Thousand Island Dressing was reportedly developed by Boldt's chef." Despite claims that he was involved in the introduction of the salad dressing at the Waldorf, Tschirky did not mention it in his cookbook published during that period.

When University of Wisconsin sociologist Michael Bell and his graduate students attempted to determine the origin of Thousand Island dressing in 2010, they found that the story differed among villages and islands in the Thousand Islands region. They discovered the existence of a third origin story in which the original recipe was based upon French dressing, which is supported by a recipe published in the 11th edition of The Fannie Farmer Cookbook (1965). All the claims appeared to be based upon oral traditions without supporting written records.

According to Food & Wine magazine, the dressing was a traditional sauce from the late 19th century in the Thousand Islands region. The wealthy who visited the region carried bottles of it back to New York City, such as one variant served at the Herald Hotel in Clayton, New York, run by innkeeper Sophia Lelonde.

Some food writers claim that Theo Rooms, a chef at the Blackstone Hotel in Chicago, invented the dressing during the same period. The earliest known print reference to Thousand Island dressing was in October 1912, when Thousand Island on lettuce was a trendy dish in Kansas City. The known earliest recipe was published in another paper in the same city. A syndicated column ran on December 26 of that year in Kansas, Louisiana, Mississippi, and Oklahoma papers. Other papers ran it in the new year, and alternate recipes followed.

== Ingredients ==
Thousand Island dressing is a creamy salad dressing and condiment made from a base of mayonnaise and usually ketchup or tomato purée and chopped pickles; it can also include lemon juice, orange juice, paprika, Worcestershire sauce, mustard, vinegar, cream, chili sauce, olive oil, and hot sauce. It also typically contains finely chopped ingredients, which can include onions, bell peppers, green olives, hard-boiled egg, parsley, pimento, chives, garlic, or chopped nuts (such as walnuts or chestnuts).

== Uses ==
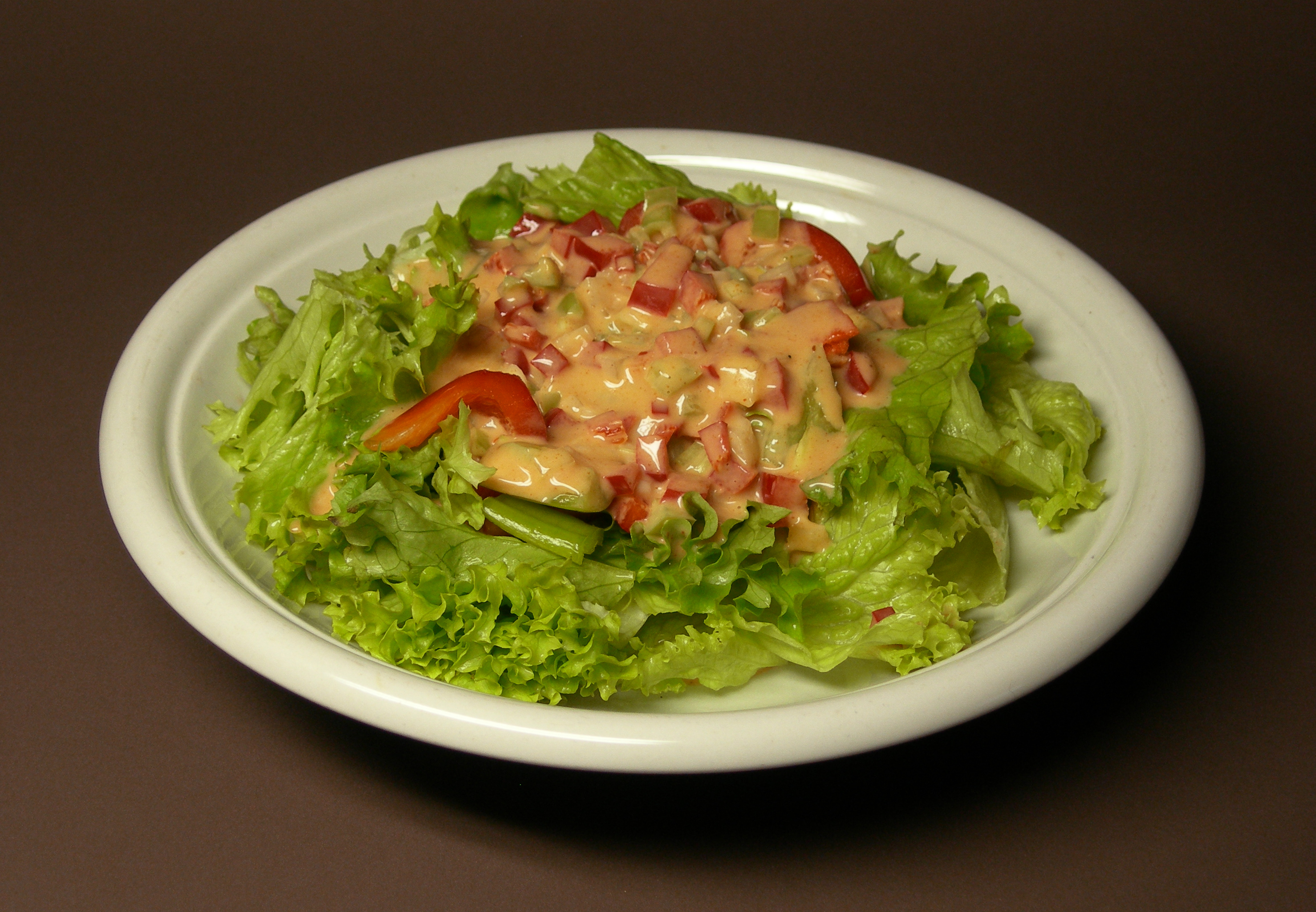
Thousand Island dressing on a salad

Thousand Island dressing's principal use is as a salad dressing. It is also widely used in fast-food restaurants and diners in the United States, where it is often called "special sauce" or "secret sauce". McDonald's Big Mac sauce is a variation on Thousand Island dressing. In-N-Out Burger's "spread", served on burgers and several "secret menu" items, is also based on Thousand Island dressing. Thousand Island dressing is sometimes used in Reuben sandwiches in lieu of Russian dressing.

== Similar preparations ==
Rhode Island dressing (Rhode islandsås), introduced by the Swedish restaurateur Tore Wretman, is similar to Thousand Island and very popular in Sweden. Its name is confusing, especially for foreigners, and its origin unclear, since the dressing has no known relationship to Rhode Island and the name is not used for preparations outside Sweden.

In Germany, a similar salad dressing is called "American dressing".

== See also ==
- French dressing
- Russian dressing
- Fry sauce
- Marie Rose sauce
- Salsa golf
- Yum yum sauce
- Big Mac sauce
