= Branston (brand) =

British food brand known for its pickled chutney

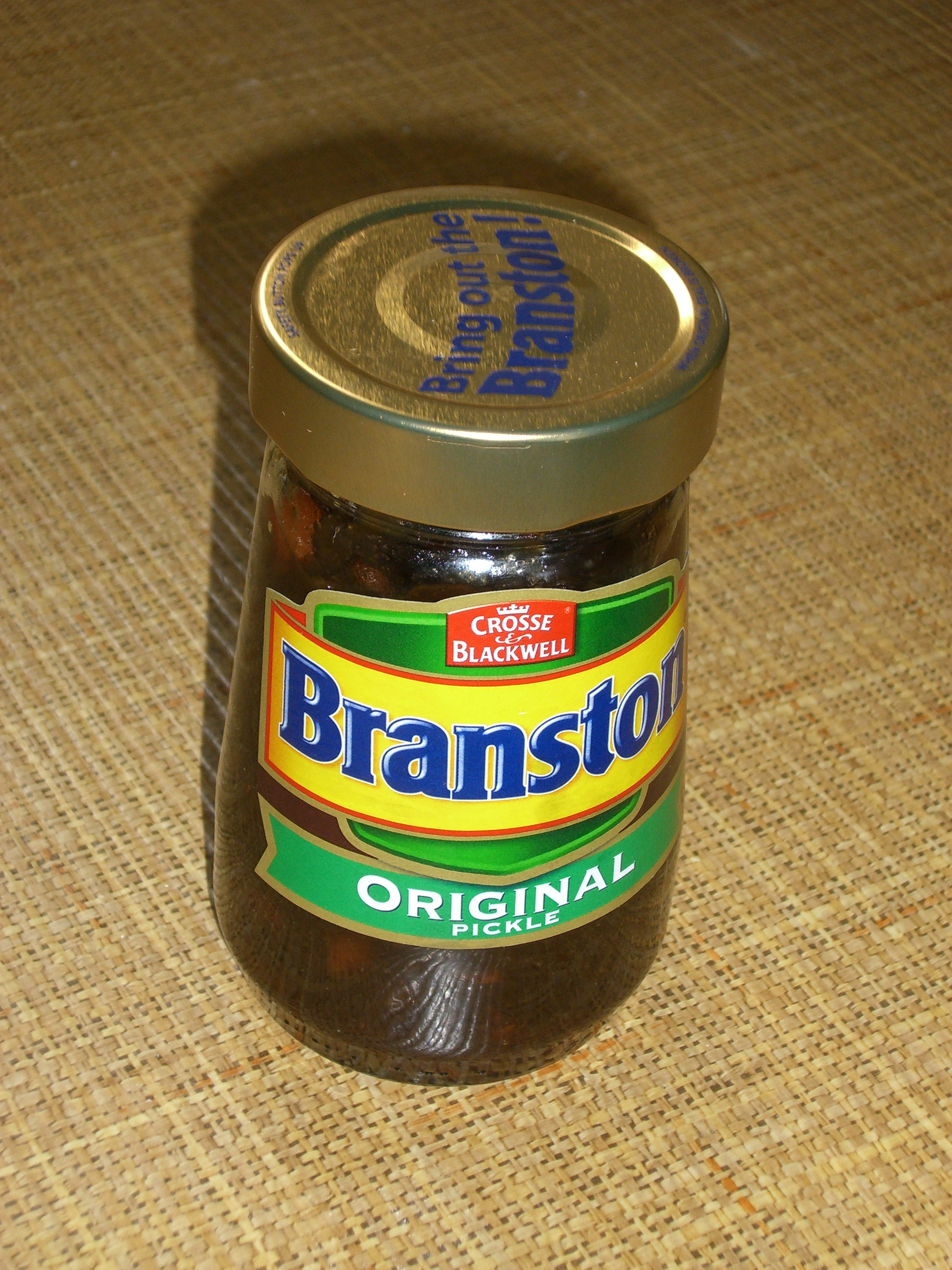
- A jar of Branston Pickle when it was sold under the Crosse & Blackwell brand
- Product type: Pickle, sauces
- Current owner: Mizkan
- Country: England
- Introduced: 1922
- Previous owners: Crosse & Blackwell; Nestlé; Premier Foods
- Tagline: Bring out the Branston
- Website: bringoutthebranston.co.uk

Branston is an English food brand best known for the original Branston Pickle. This is a condiment consisting of diced vegetables pickled in a sauce made from vinegar, tomato, apple, and spices. It has a sweet, spicy consistency like a chutney, and is commonly served as part of a ploughman's lunch in British pubs.

The pickle was based on the South Asian pickles and chutneys that Anglo-Indians had liked during the British Raj (1858–1947). It was first made in the Crosse & Blackwell factory at Branston, Staffordshire in 1922. The brand was extended with other products such as mayonnaise, ketchup, salad cream, baked beans, piccalilli, and brown sauce.

The Crosse & Blackwell pickle business was bought by Premier Foods in 2004, and production was moved to Bury St Edmunds, Suffolk. In 2012, the Branston brand was sold to Mizkan, which continues to manufacture the products in Bury St Edmunds.

== Background ==
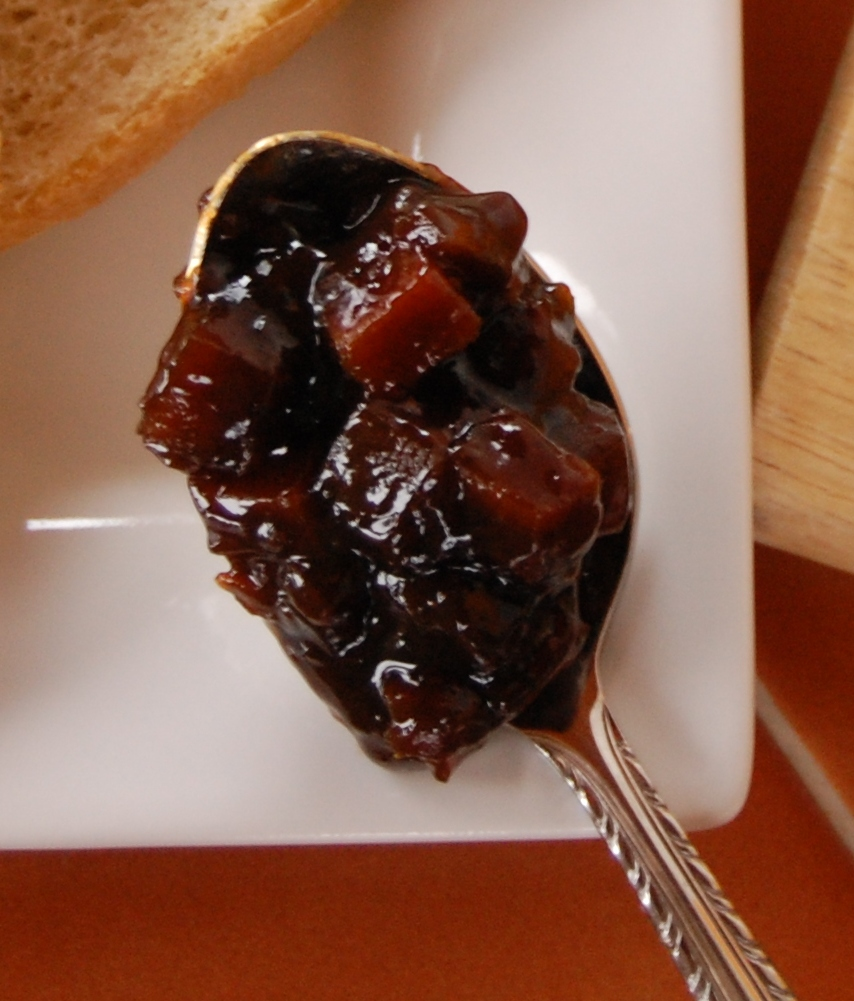
A spoonful of Branston Pickle

During the British Raj in India, Anglo-Indians discovered South Asian pickles and chutneys, and cooked many kinds. Sailors found that the preserve-like varieties were useful accompaniments to their maritime diet of salt meat and dry ship's biscuit. Quantities were brought home to Britain, soon to be copied by cooks and further modified from the Indian originals.

Branston Pickle is made from a variety of diced vegetables, including swede, carrots, onions and cauliflower pickled in a sauce made from vinegar, tomato, apple and spices. Branston Pickle is sweet and spicy with a "chutney-like" consistency, containing chunks of vegetables in a thick brown sticky sauce. It is commonly served as part of a ploughman's lunch, a popular menu item in British pubs. It is frequently combined with cheese in sandwiches, and many sandwich shops in the UK offer cheese and pickle as an option. It is available in the standard 'chunky' version, a 'small chunk' variety, and a 'smooth' pureed variety, which makes it easier to spread onto bread; convenient squeeze-bottle packs are amongst the range. The Indian Express comments that the product is "much like Bengal's date and tomato chutney and Rajasthan's meetha-nimbu chutney", being "more sweet-savoury than spicy". It suggests that the pickle could be "one of India’s most long-lasting gifts to the British."

== Brand history ==
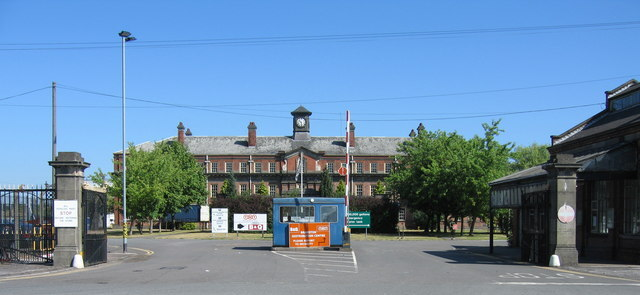
Branston Depot – the original factory of Branston Pickle; on Burton Road, Branston, Staffordshire in 2006

Branston Pickle was first made in 1922 in the village of Branston near Burton upon Trent, Staffordshire, by Crosse & Blackwell. The Branston factory proved to be uneconomical, and production was moved to the Crosse & Blackwell subsidiary E Lazenby & Sons in Bermondsey, London, where it invested in new buildings in 1924 and 1926, which remained in use until 1969.

Additional Branston products have included mayonnaise, ketchup, salad cream, baked beans, piccalilli, and "rich and fruity" brown sauce. From around 2003, Walkers produced a variety of crisps called "Cheese and Branston Pickle". They had been discontinued by 2023.

In 1960, Nestlé bought the Crosse & Blackwell Group. In 2004, Nestlé sold the pickle business to Premier Foods and production was moved to Bury St Edmunds in Suffolk. In late 2012, Premier Foods sold the Branston brand to Japanese food manufacturer Mizkan Group for £92.5 million, joining Sarson's vinegar and Hayward's pickled onions as recent Premier Foods to Mizkan brand acquisitions. The Bury St Edmunds plant continues to manufacture Branston products. in Europe, the Crosse & Blackwell brand was sold separately to Princes Group. Over 17 million jars a year are sold in the UK.

In October 2005, Premier Foods launched Branston Baked Beans. The marketing and promotion of this product were aimed at challenging Heinz's dominance of the UK baked bean market. This marketing included an advert, featuring a Branston Bean Tin explaining how Branston Beans are very "saucy". Promotional activities included a 'Great British Bean Poll' where members of the public across the country were invited to blind taste both 'the brand leader' (assumed to be Heinz) and Branston. In the poll, 76% of participants picked Branston over Heinz. Heinz elected to change their recipe in the face of this aggressive activity. Also in 2005, Premier Foods attempted to leverage the traditional Branston Pickle brand name by producing Branston Relishes in four different flavours: Hot Chilli & Jalapeño, Gherkin, Sweet Onion and Tomato & Red Pepper.

Around November 2015, a sweet chili-flavoured pickle was launched, and the brand's rich and fruity sauce was re-launched, along with two new sauce flavours, rich and spicy and rich and smoky. In 2017, Branston launched its ketchup, mayonnaise and brown sauce lines in single-serving sachet packaging.

== See also ==
- List of brand-name condiments
- List of chutneys
- Major Grey's Chutney

== Sources ==
- Brown, Patricia (24 February 1998). Anglo-Indian Food and Customs. Penguin Books India. ISBN 0-14-027137-6.
- Collingham, Lizzie (2006) [2005 (Chatto & Windus)]. Curry: A Tale of Cooks and Conquerors. London: Vintage Books. ISBN 978-0-099-43786-4.
