= List of brand-name condiments =

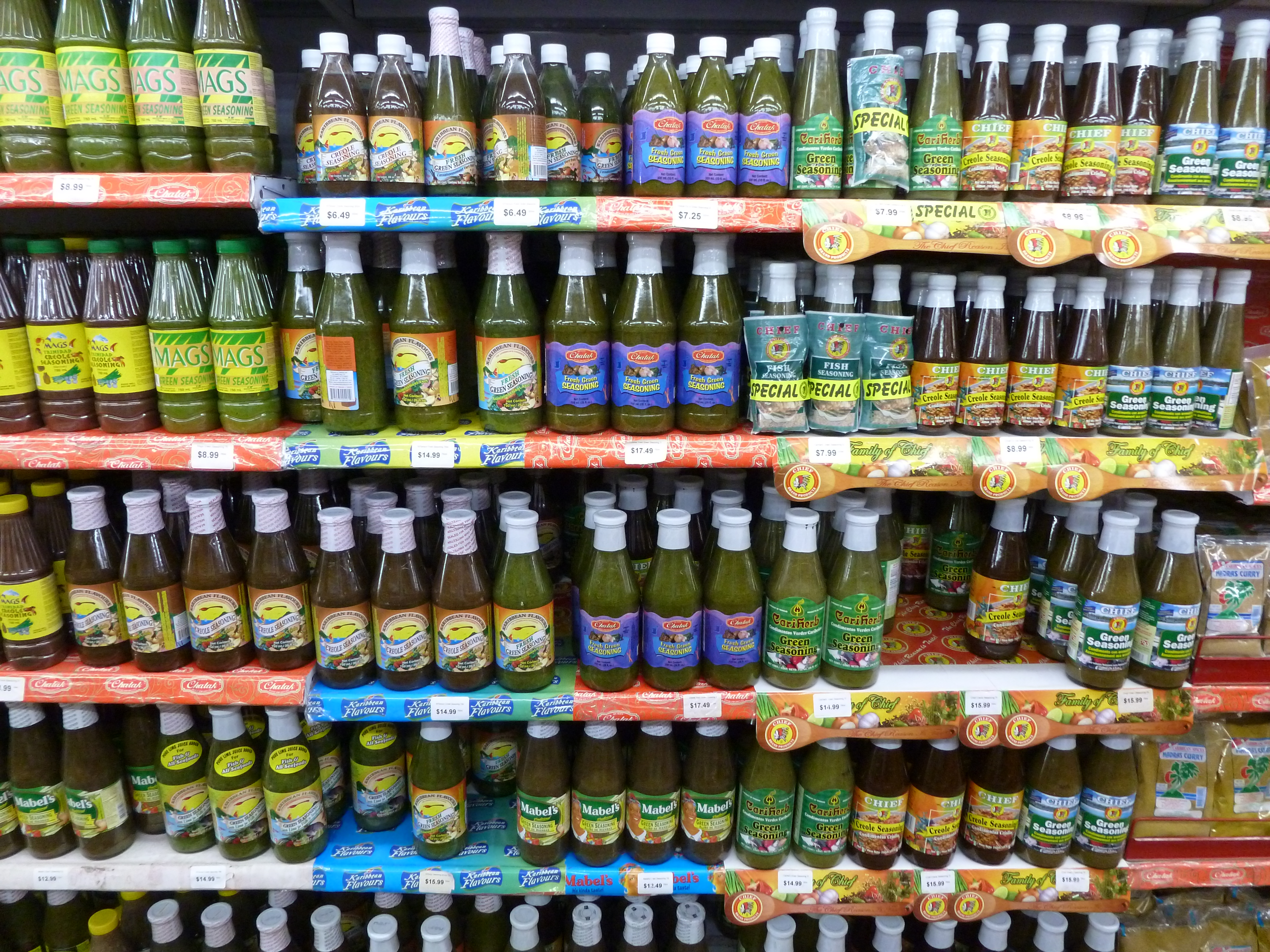
Bottled seasoning condiments at a store in Trinidad and Tobago

This is a list of brand-name condiments. A condiment is a supplemental food, such as a sauce, that is added to some foods to impart a particular flavor, enhance its flavor, or, in some cultures, to complement the dish. The term originally described pickled or preserved foods, but has shifted meaning over time. Many condiments exist in various countries, regions and cultures. A brand or mark is a name, term, design, symbol, or other feature that distinguishes an organization or product from its rivals in the eyes of the customer. Brands are used in business, marketing, and advertising.

== Brand-name condiments ==
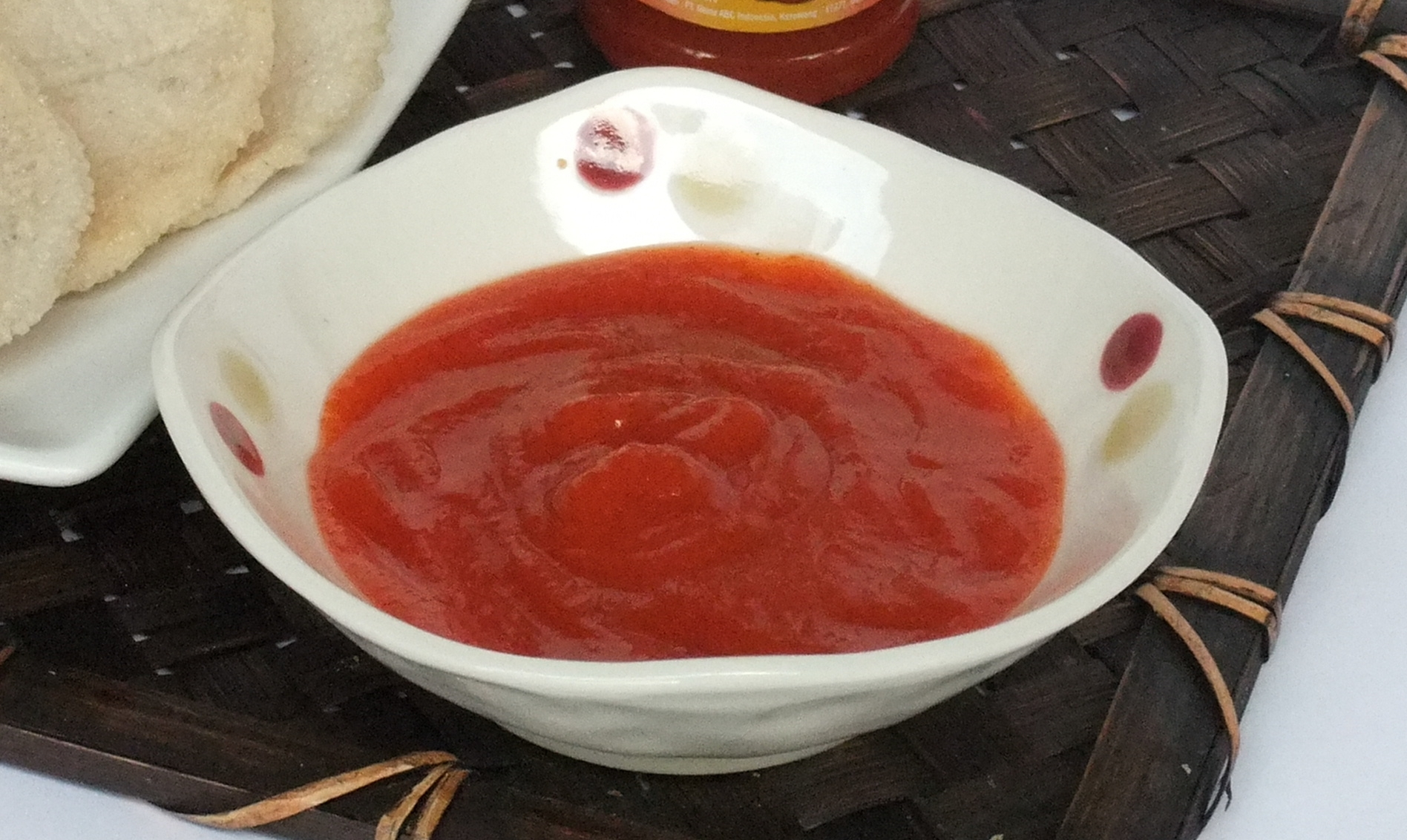
ABC bottled sambal sauce

- A.1. Sauce – a brand of brown sauce
- ABC – an Indonesian brand of condiments
- Ajinomoto – a brand of monosodium glutamate
- Aromat – general-purpose seasoning powder based on salt and monosodium glutamate popular in Switzerland and South Africa under the brand name Knorr
- AussieMite – the brand name for a dark brown, salty food paste mainly used as a spread on sandwiches and toast
- Big Twin Sauce – a condiment featured by the Hardee's and Carl's Jr. restaurant chain
- Bisto – a British instant gravy brand

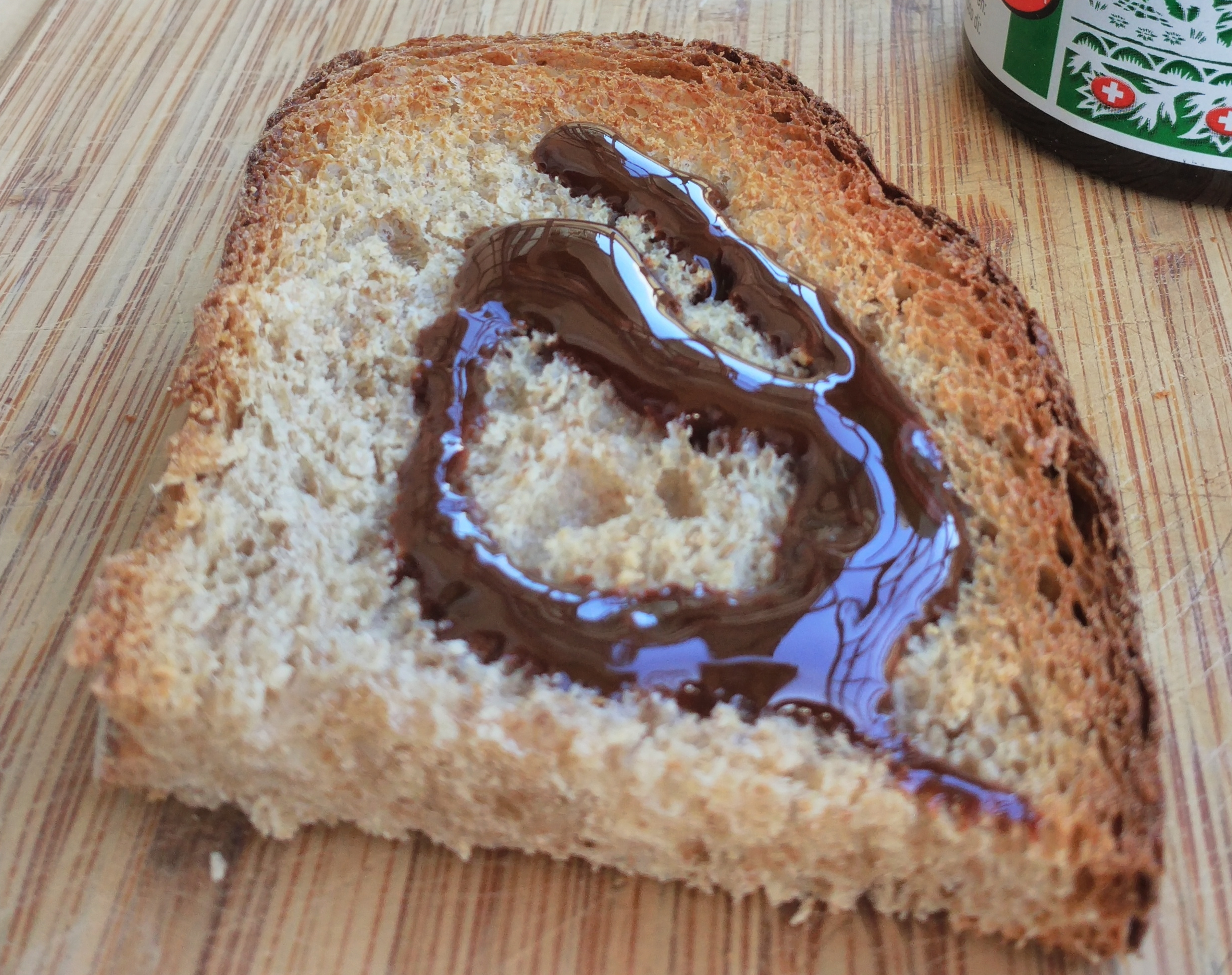
Cenovis atop toast

- Cenovis – a product based on yeast extract that is similar to Marmite and Vegemite
- Chef Brown Sauce – a brown sauce most popular in Ireland
- Daddies – a brand of ketchup and brown sauce in the United Kingdom
- Datu Puti – a Philippine brand of soy sauce and vinegar
- French's Mustard - an American brand for yellow mustard, also produces ketchup and other condiments

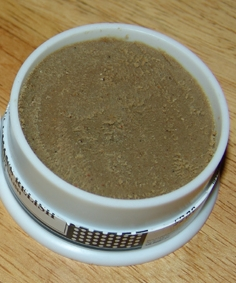
An open pot of Gentleman's Relish

- Gentleman's Relish – a brand of anchovy paste also known as Patum Peperium
- Goober – a combination of peanut butter and jelly in a single jar
- Guinness Yeast Extract – a former Irish savoury spread that was a by-product of the Guinness beer brewing process. The product was launched in Ireland on 2 November 1936 and discontinued in 1968.
- Haywards – a brand of various pickles that is popular in the United Kingdom

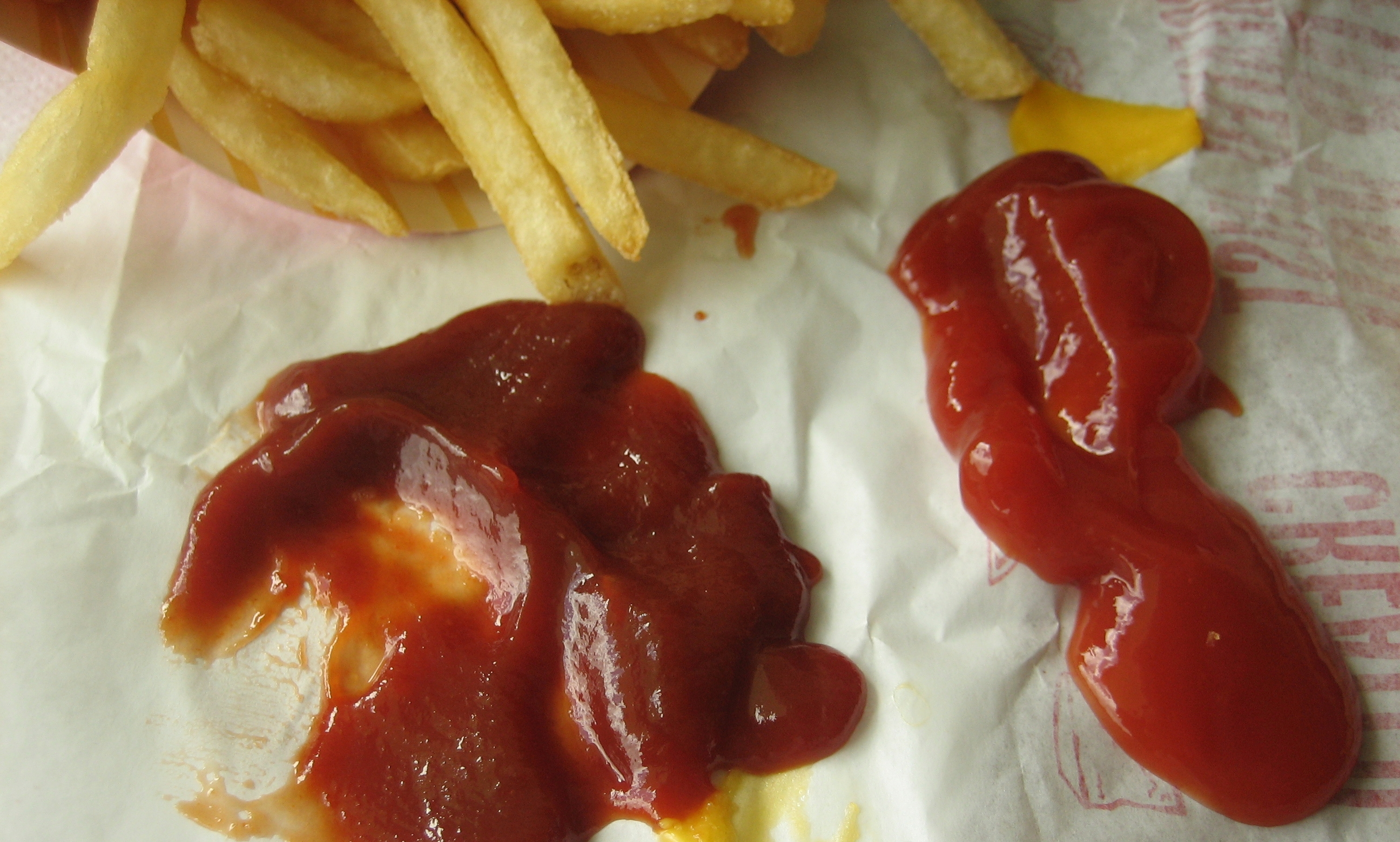
Heinz Tomato Ketchup blended with balsamic vinegar (left) and standard Heinz Tomato Ketchup (right)

- Heinz Sandwich Spread – a blend of salad cream and relish popular in the Netherlands and Britain
- Heinz Tomato Ketchup – a ketchup brand first introduced in 1876
- Henderson's Relish – a spicy and fruity condiment, similar in appearance to Worcestershire sauce, but which contains no anchovies
- HP Sauce – a brown sauce brand
- Joppiesaus – Type of sauce from the Netherlands

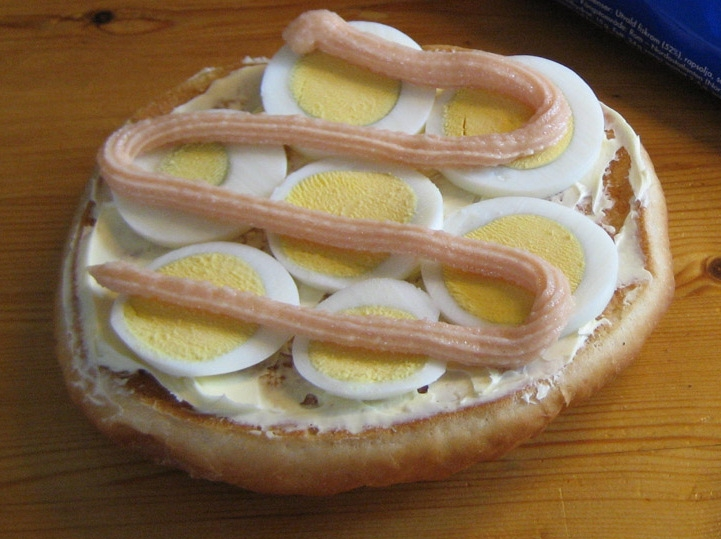
Kalles Kaviar atop an egg sandwich

- Kalles Kaviar – a Swedish brand of smörgåskaviar, a fish roe spread
- Kitchen Bouquet – a browning and seasoning sauce primarily composed of caramel with vegetable flavorings
- Lea & Perrins – a Worcestershire sauce brand
- Lizano sauce – Costa Rican condiment
- Lady's Choice – a Philippine brand of condiments
- Mama Sita's – a Philippine brand of condiments
- Mang Tomas – a lechon sauce brand in the Philippines
- Marmite - a British yeast spread
- Marmite (New Zealand) - a New Zealand yeast spread
- Meadow Lea – one of Australia's leading brands of polyunsaturated margarine spreads
- Mike's Hot Honey – American hot honey company
- Mizkan – Japanese food manufacturer
- Morton Salt – American salt production company
- Mrs. Dash – Brand of seasoning products
- Nocilla – a hazelnut and chocolate spread
- Nudossi – a hazelnut spread

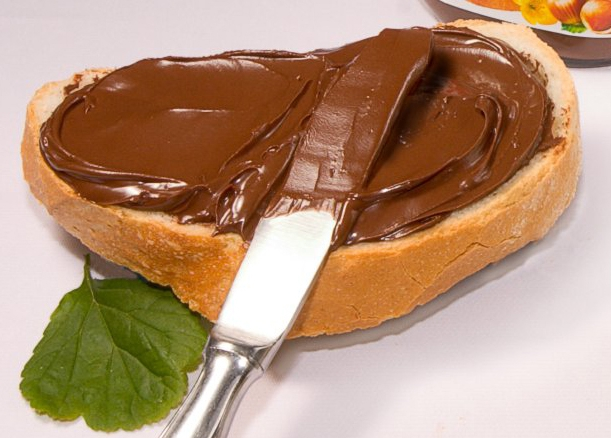
Nutella spread atop bread

- Nutella – a hazelnut and chocolate spread
- Pickapeppa Sauce – Jamaican sauce
- Promite – Food paste
- Rosella - a ketchup brand first introduced in 1876
- Sarson's – a brand of malt vinegar brewed in the United Kingdom.
- Saxa – Brand of salt
- Secret Stadium Sauce – Condiment popular in Wisconsin, U.S.
- Silver Swan – a Philippine brand of soy sauce and vinegar
- Tata Salt – launched in 1983 by Tata Chemicals as India's first packaged iodised salt brand
- Tabasco - Pepper sauce manufactured in Louisiana, US
- UFC – a brand of banana ketchup in the Philippines
- Vegemite – an Australian food spread made from leftover brewers' yeast extract with various vegetable and spice additives
- Vegeta – a mixture primarily of salt with flavour enhancers, spices and various vegetables
- Vitam-R - a German yeast spread

Brand name condiments

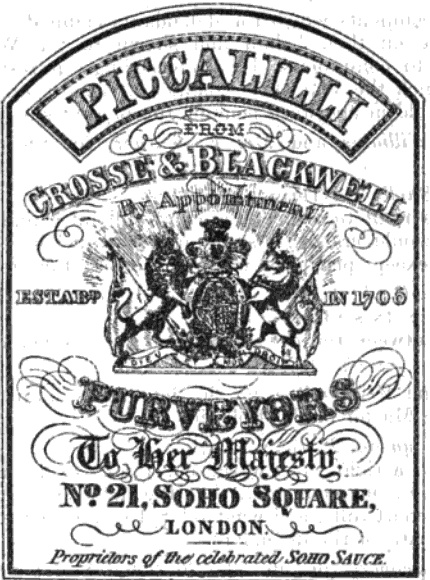
A Crosse & Blackwell label for piccalilli, c. 1867

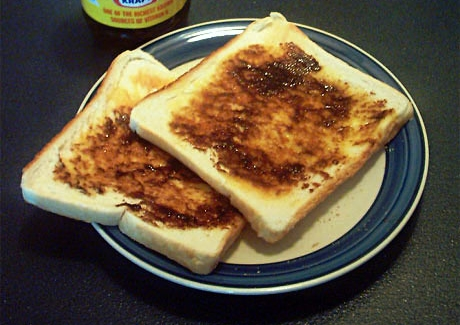
Vegemite on toast

=== Barbecue sauces ===
- Ah-So – American sauce and marinade brand
- Bull's-Eye Barbecue Sauce – Barbecue sauce by Kraft
- ETA Original Barbecue Sauce - Brand of barbecue sauce
- Jim Beam's BBQ Sauce – American brand of bourbon whiskey
- KC Masterpiece – Barbecue sauce
- Maull's barbecue sauce – Brand of barbecue sauce
- Reggae Reggae Sauce – Brand of barbecue sauce (UK, jerk/BBQ sauce)
- Shacha sauce – Chinese condiment
- Siu haau sauce – Cantonese barbecue sauce
- Sweet Baby Ray's – Barbecue sauce brand

=== Hot sauces ===
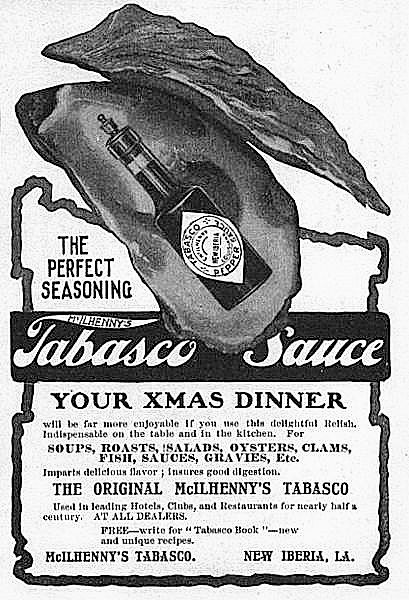
A Tabasco sauce advertisement from c. 1905

- Blair's Sauces and Snacks – United States snack company
- Búfalo – Brand of hot sauce and other condiments
- Cholula Hot Sauce – U.S. brand of hot sauce
- Crystal Hot Sauce – Brand of Louisiana hot sauce
- Dave's Gourmet – American sauce manufacturer
- D'Elidas – Panamanian hot sauce brand
- Dog-gone Sauce – Hot sauce company
- Frank's RedHot – Hot sauce made from cayenne peppers
- Indofood Sambal
- Louisiana Hot Sauce – Brand of hot sauce
- Marie Sharp's – Condiment producing company
- Nali Sauce – Popular sauce from Malawi
- Scorpion Bay Hot Sauce
- Sriracha sauce (Huy Fong Foods) – American brand of sriracha chili sauce
- Tabasco sauce – an American brand of hot sauce made exclusively from tabasco peppers, vinegar, and salt. It is produced by the McIlhenny Company of Louisiana.
- Tapatío hot sauce – American hot sauce
- Texas Pete – American-made hot sauce
- Trappey's Hot Sauce – American brand of hot sauce
- Valentina – Mexican brand of hot sauce

=== Mayonnaise ===
- Duke's Mayonnaise – American brand of mayonnaise
- Hellmann's Mayonnaise – Food brands
- Kewpie – Japanese mayonnaise brand
- Kraft Mayo – Mayonnaise brand
- Mrs. Schlorer's – Defunct American condiment company
- Praise – Australian brand of mayonnaise
- Zoosh – Australian brand of mayonnaise

=== Salad dressings ===
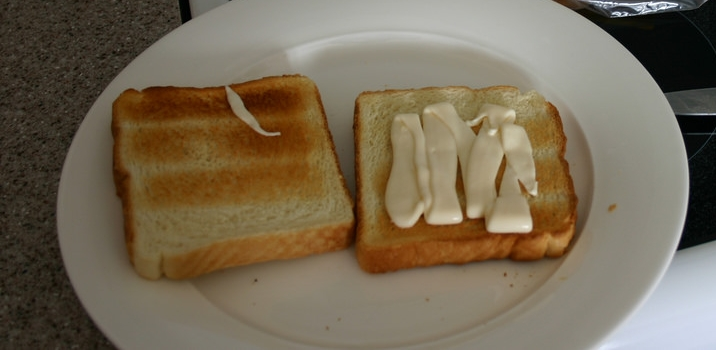
Miracle Whip spread on toast

- Mazzetti - an American brand of salad dressing
- Miracle Whip – Salad dressing and mayonnaise substitute
- Newman's Own – American food company named after Paul Newman
- Praise – Australian brand of Salad dressing
- Wish-Bone – an American brand of salad dressing, marinades, dips and pasta salad

== See also ==
- Condiment
- List of condiments
- List of mustard brands
- List of brand name food products
