= Red cooking =

Chinese culinary technique

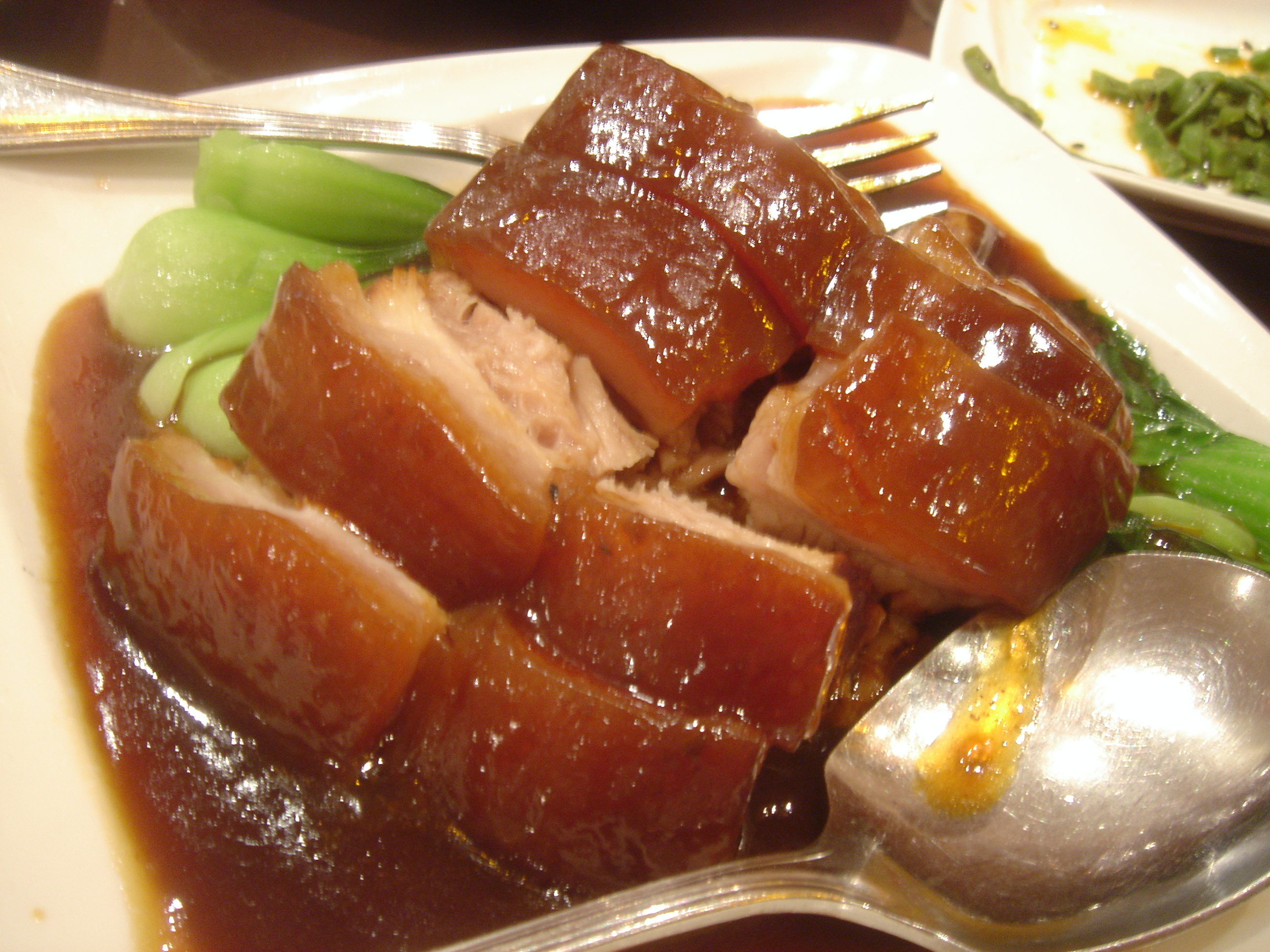
Red-cooked pork belly served with thickened braising sauce

Red cooking, also called Chinese stewing, red stewing, red braising, or flavor potting, is a slow braising Chinese cooking technique that imparts a reddish-brown coloration to the prepared food. Red cooking likely originated in Jiangsu province. While the technique is used all over China, it is most strongly associated with the Jiangnan region.

There are two types of red cooking:

- Hongshao (traditional Chinese: 紅燒; simplified Chinese: 红烧; pinyin: hóngshāo): can be done in less than 20 minutes and usually does not require much water
- Lu (traditional Chinese: 滷; simplified Chinese: 卤; pinyin: lǔ): usually requires prolonged cooking of up to several hours and the items must be submerged in the cooking liquid.

== Types ==
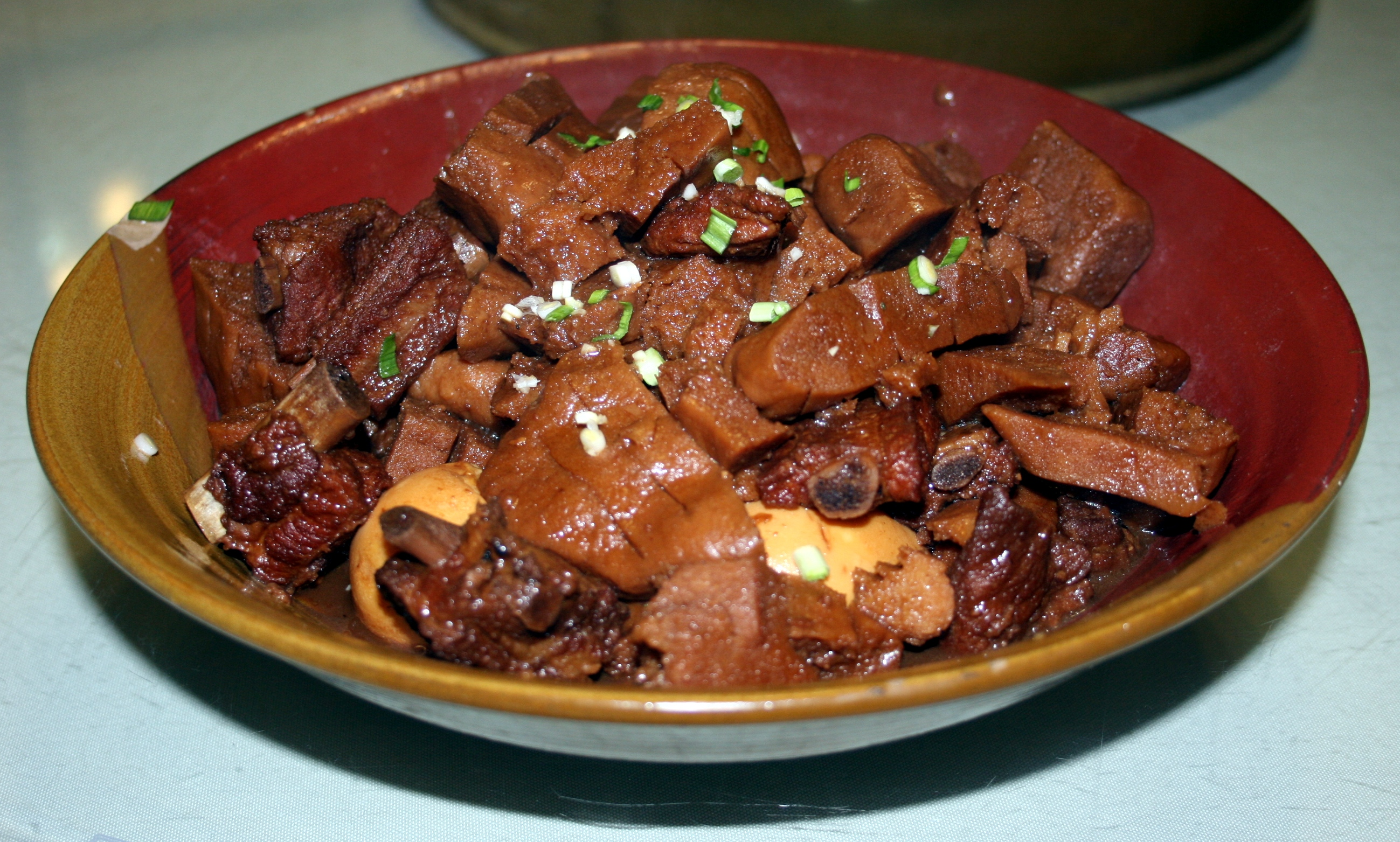
Red-cooked ribs

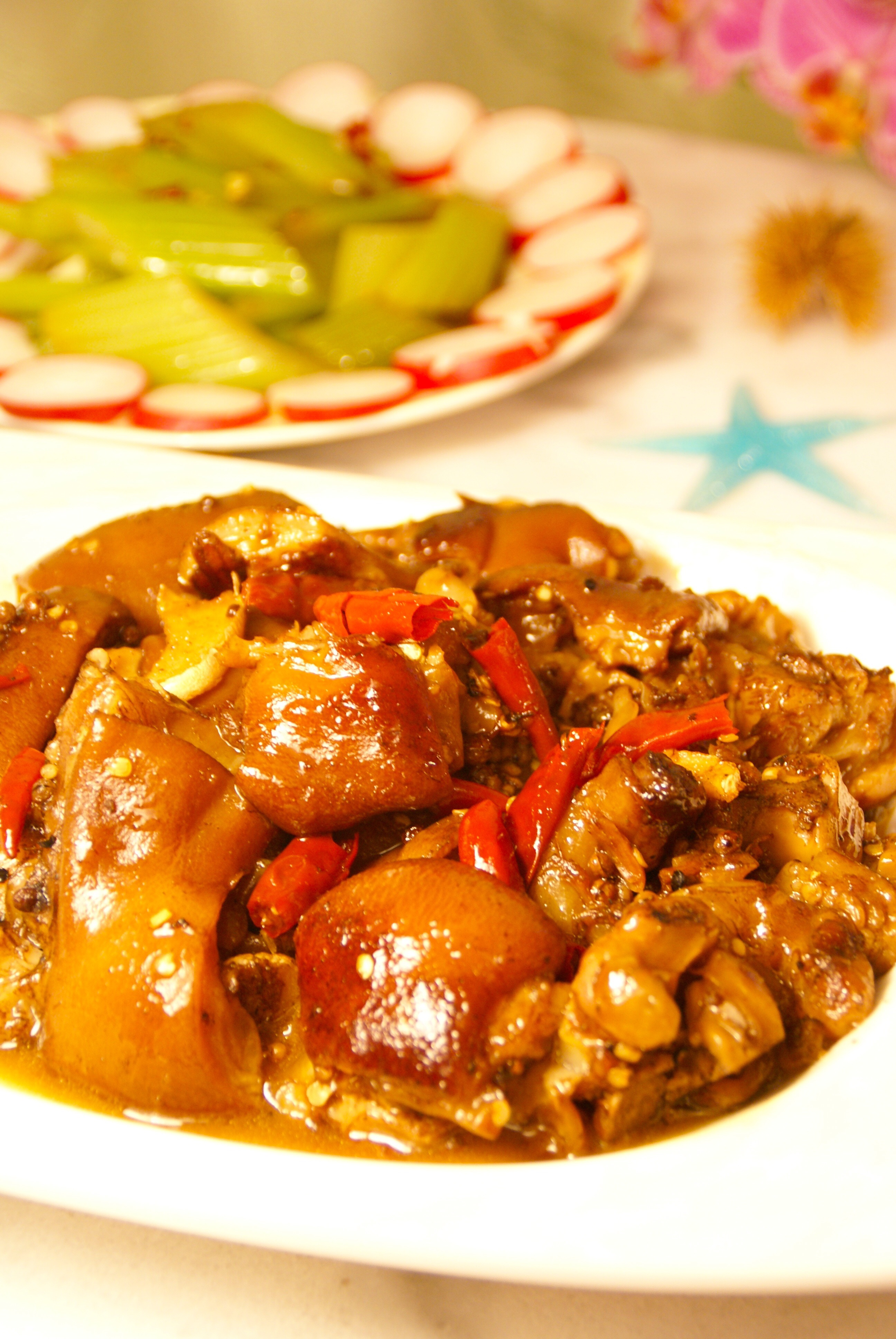
Ham hock

Soy sauce (usually a mix of light and dark soy sauce), fermented bean paste, red fermented tofu and rock sugar is commonly used to both flavor and impart a reddish-brown hue to the items being cooked. Food coloring is sometimes added for a more intense red coloration. Both lu and hongshao are forms of stewing or braising characterized by usage of soy sauce, Chinese rice wine (Shaoxing wine, huangjiu etc.) and rock sugar. Whole spices (star anise, Chinese black cardamom (caoguo, tsao-ko), cassia or fennel seeds) or five-spice powder are crucial elements in these dishes but are used in moderation so that their flavors do not overwhelm the main ingredients.

Red-cooked stews may be heavy in meat content or contain a variety of meats, vegetables, and hard-boiled eggs. Such dishes may be served hot or cold, and the sauce or stock is often reused as master stock.

== See also ==
- Ah-so sauce
- Char siu
- Fujian cuisine
- Hunan cuisine
- Jiangsu cuisine
- Kho (cooking technique)
- List of cooking techniques
- Lou mei
- Shanghai cuisine
- Zhejiang cuisine
