= Aromat =

Swiss food seasoning

Knorr Aromat Seasoning
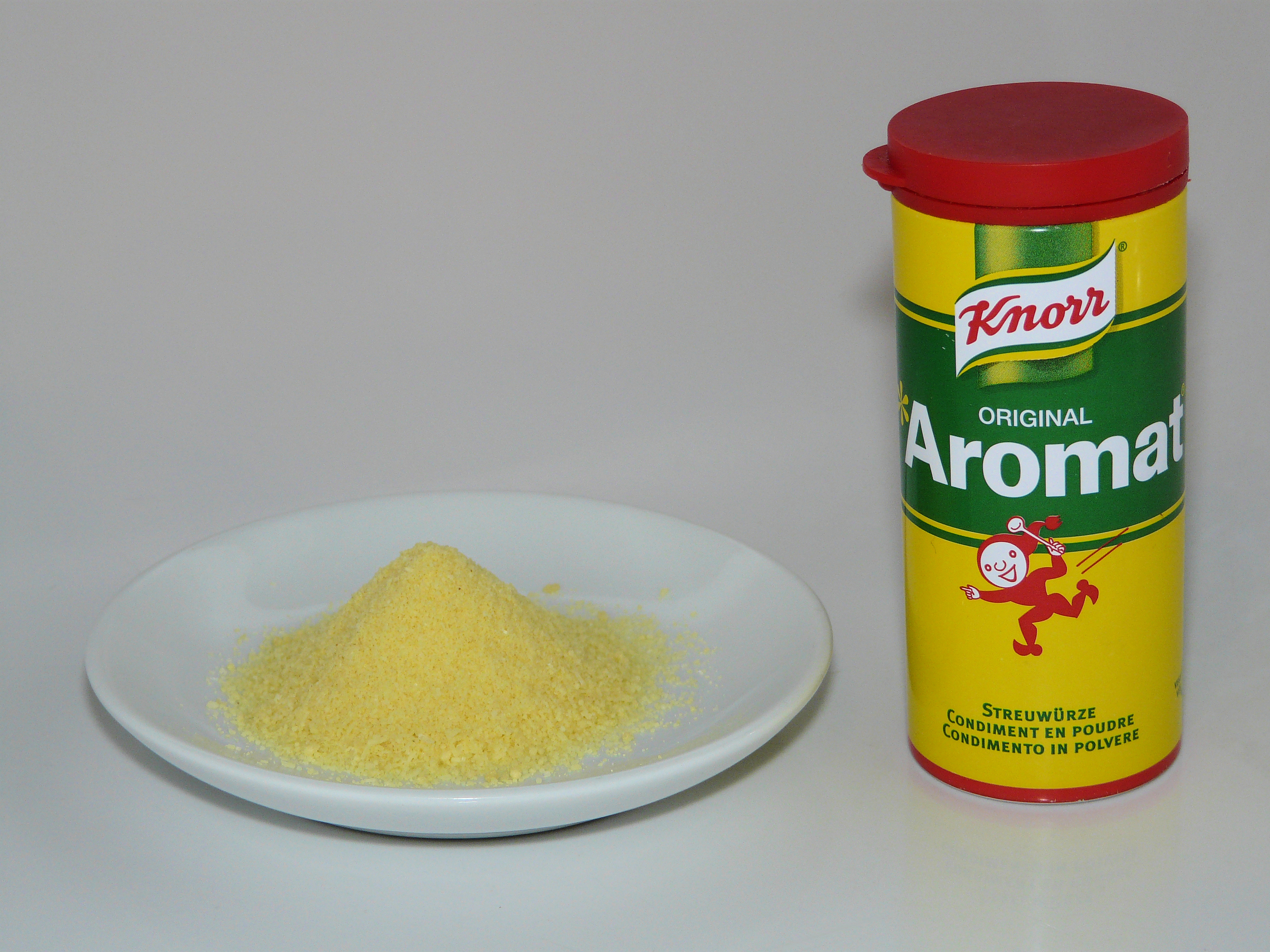
- Current owner: Knorr, Unilever
- Country: Switzerland
- Introduced: 1953; 73 years ago
- Website: Knorr Aromat

Aromat is a food seasoning, developed in Switzerland by Walter Obrist for Knorr Thayngen, the Swiss branch of the German food company Knorr, in 1952. Aromat was originally called "Pflanzenextrakt", which means plant extract in German. Knorr dropped the name in 1953 and altered its form, from cubes to a powdered seasoning. Aromat was marketed internationally and is described by Knorr as an "all purpose savoury seasoning".

The ingredients in Aromat vary by market, but include the flavour enhancer monosodium glutamate, and may also comprise yeast extract, wheat or corn flour, trans fat (partially hydrogenated vegetable oil), and various herbs, spices, vegetable extracts and other flavourings.

== See also ==
- Bouillon cube
- List of brand name condiments
