= ABC (food brand) =

Indonesian food and drink company

PT Heinz ABC Indonesia
- Formerly: CV Central Foods; PT ABC Central Food Industry
- Type: Joint-venture subsidiary
- Industry: Food
- Founded: 1975
- Founder: Chandra Djojonegoro
- Headquarters: Jakarta, Indonesia
- Key people: Husain Djojonegoro
- Parent: ABC Holding; Kraft Heinz
- Website: heinzabc.co.id

PT Heinz ABC Indonesia is an Indonesia-based food and drink subsidiary of Kraft Heinz, based in Jakarta, and manufactures sauces, condiments, juices and syrups. ABC brand was previously owned by PT ABC Central Food Industry, a company that was bought by Heinz in 1999.

ABC is the largest Heinz's business in Asia, and one of the largest in the world; employing 3000 employees, 3 production facilities, 8 packing facilities, and extensive distribution network in Java and other parts of Indonesia. Today, ABC is one of 15 brands owned by Heinz worldwide.

== History ==
The company was established in 1975 in Jakarta, Indonesia, as CV Central Foods Industrial Corporation (abbreviated as Central Foods). In 1982, it was renamed PT Aneka Bina Cipta Central Food Industry, which was abbreviated as ABC Foods. It was owned by Chu brothers — Chu Sam Yak (Chandra Djojonegoro) and Chu Sok Sam — Chinese Indonesian tycoons and entrepreneurs hailed from Medan. Initially, their leading product was Kecap ABC (soy sauces, with sweet and salty variants). Later, they expanded their product to Syrup ABC (fruit syrup), Saus Tomat ABC (tomato ketchup) and Sambal ABC (hot chili sauce).

In the 1980s, ABC's products, such as syrup, sweet soy sauce and sambal hot sauce, began to lead the Indonesian market share. These products were marketed abroad, exported to the United States, Canada, Australia, Singapore, Malaysia, Brunei, Taiwan, Hong Kong, Japan, Denmark, Saudi Arabia, Netherlands, and England. In February 1999, H. J. Heinz Company acquired 65 percent share of PT ABC Central Food Industry for US$70 million.

The company's head office is located in Jalan Daan Mogot Km. 12, Jakarta, Indonesia, and operates three production plants in Karawang (West Java), Daan Mogot (Jakarta), and Pasuruan (East Java).

== Products ==
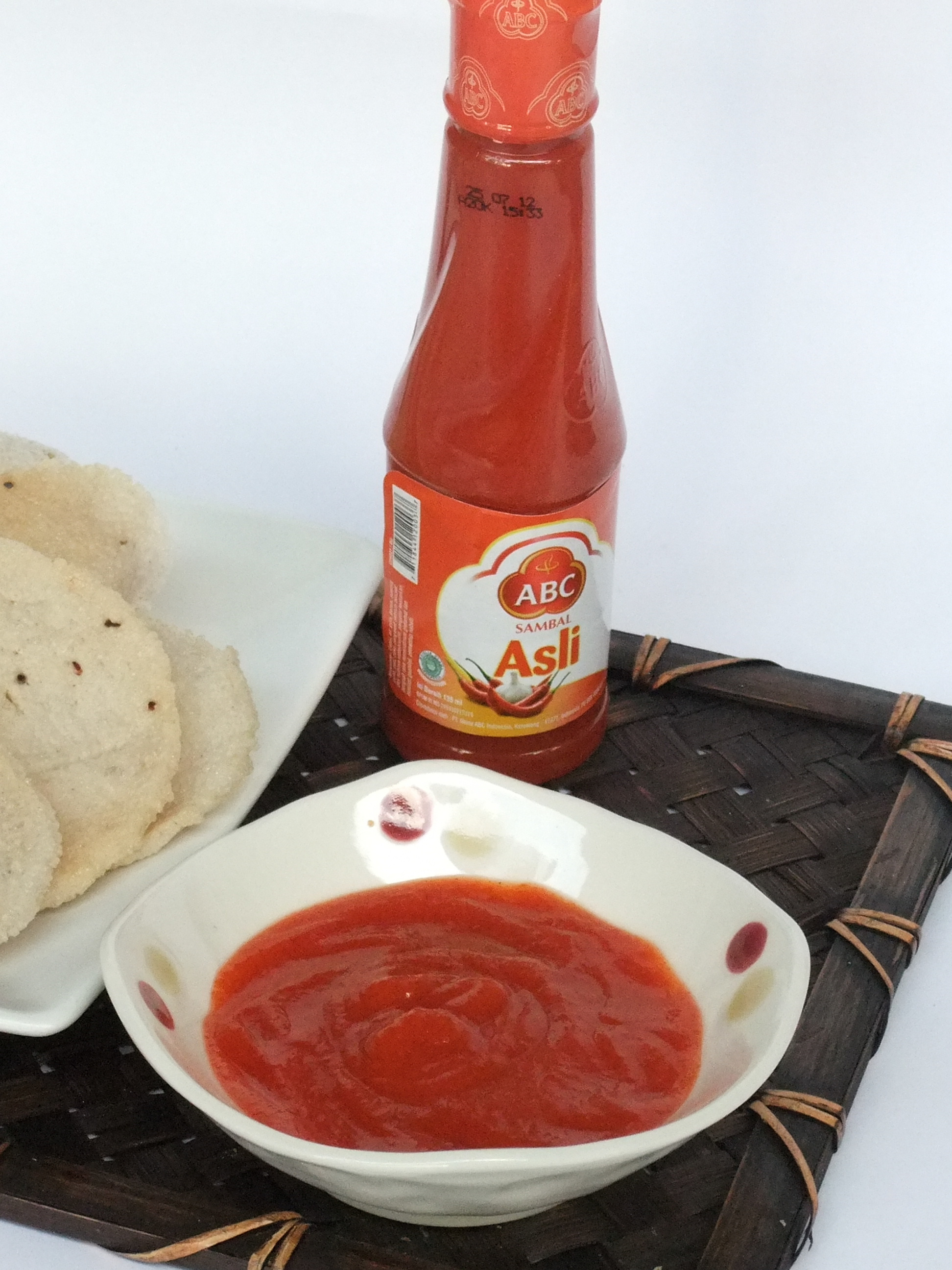
Sambal Asli ABC, one of Heinz ABC products

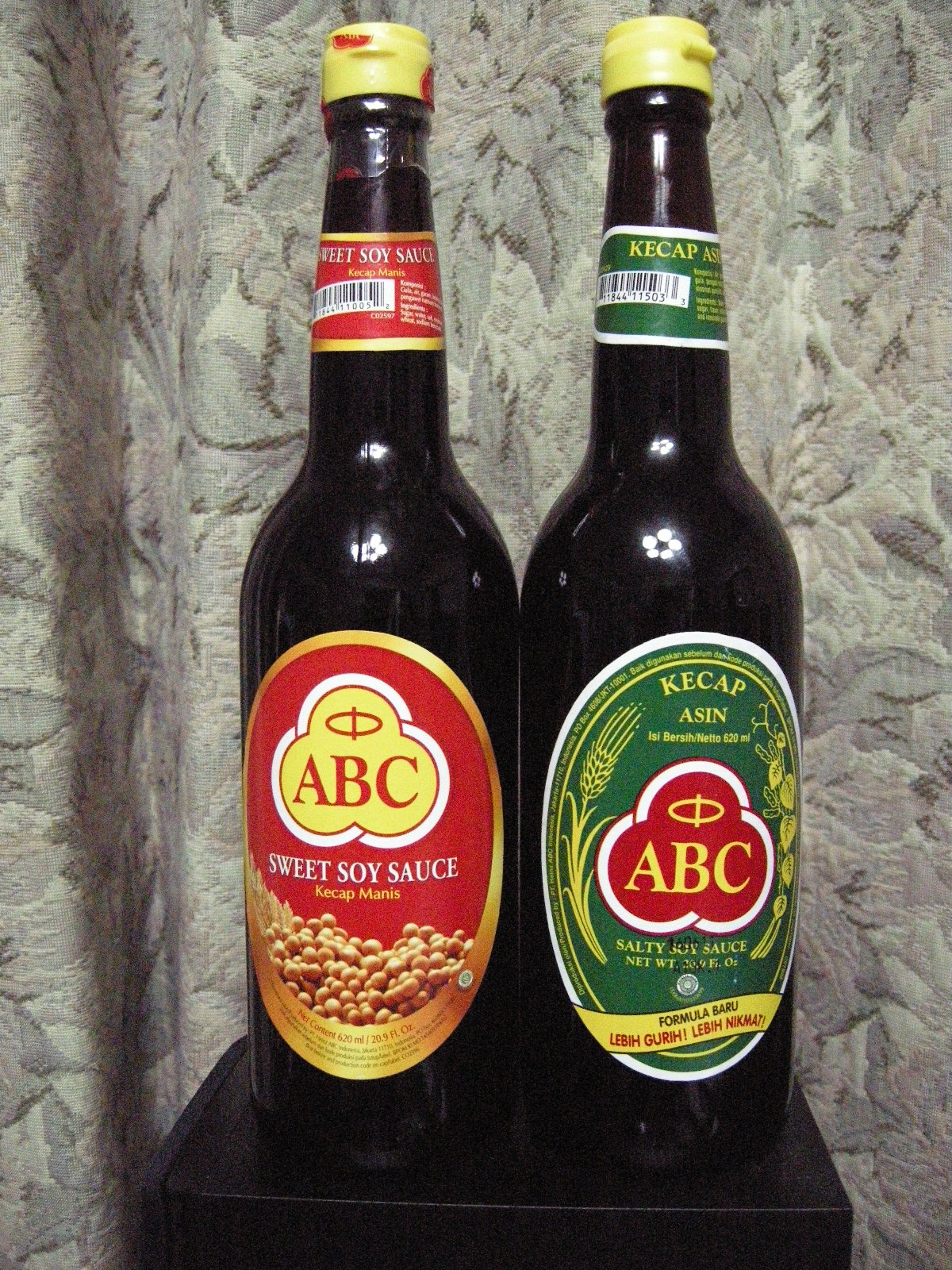
ABC brand soy sauces variants, sweet and salty

ABC's leading products are Kecap ABC (sweet soy sauce), Sambal ABC (hot chili sauce), and Syrup ABC (fruit syrup). Available commonly in Indonesia's traditional marketplaces, supermarkets, minimarts, and warungs, these products are also sold globally in Asia-Pacific, Europe and Americas; they could be found in Asian grocery stores in the United States and tokos in the Netherlands.

== See also ==
- List of brand name condiments
