= Mayonnaise =

Thick cold sauce

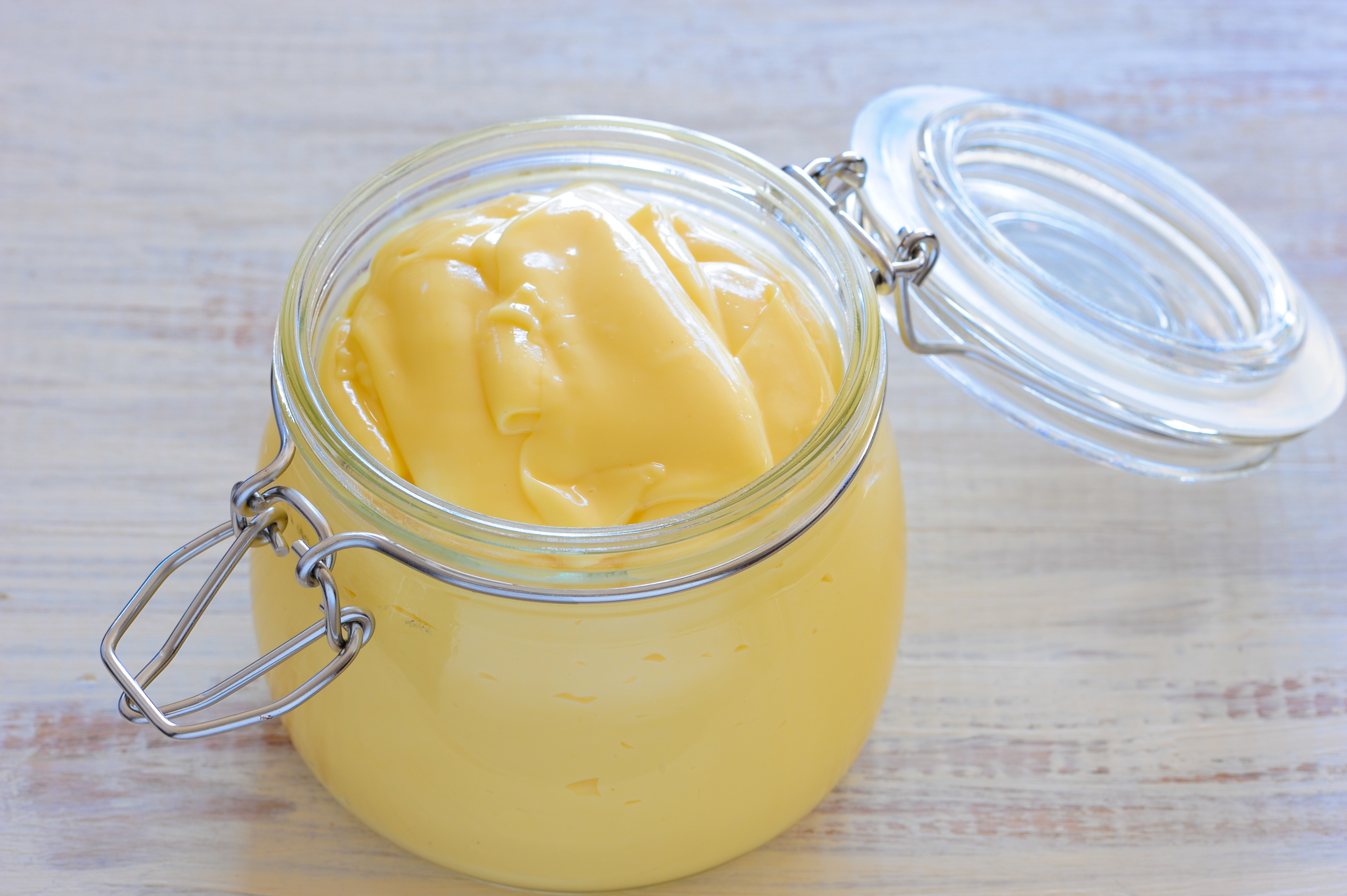
- A jar of mayonnaise.
- Alternative names: Mayo
- Type: Condiment
- Place of origin: France & Spain
- Main ingredients: Oil, egg yolk, and vinegar or lemon juice

Mayonnaise, colloquially referred to as "mayo", is a thick, creamy sauce with a rich and tangy taste that is commonly used on sandwiches, hamburgers, bound salads, and French fries. It also forms the base for other sauces, including tartar sauce, fry sauce, remoulade, salsa golf, ranch dressing, and rouille.

Mayonnaise is an emulsion of oil, egg yolk, and an acid, either vinegar or lemon juice; there are many variants using additional flavorings. The color varies from near-white to pale yellow, and its texture from a light cream to a thick gel.

Commercial eggless versions are available for those who avoid eggs.

== History ==
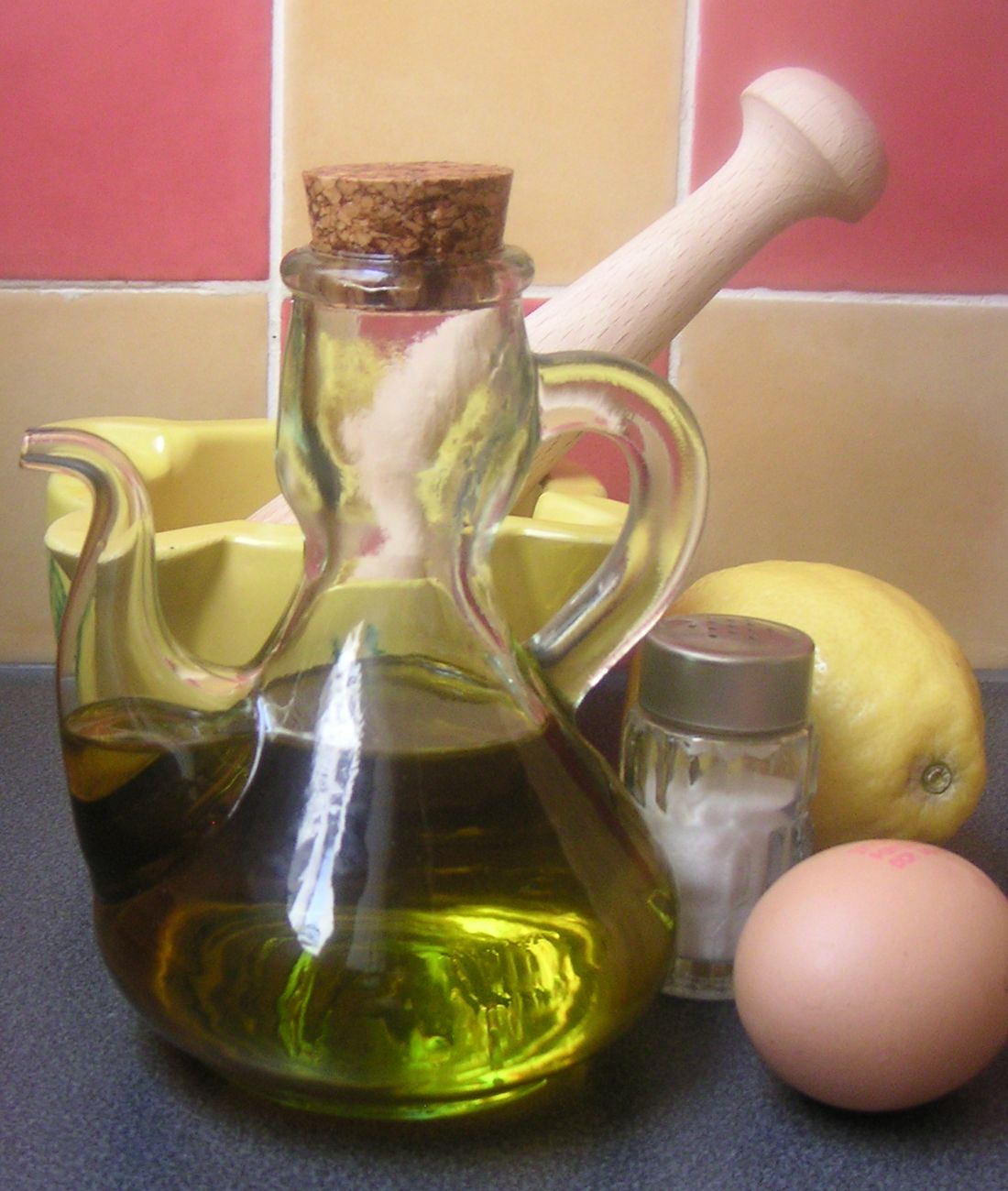
Standard ingredients and tools to make mayonnaise

Mayonnaise is a French cuisine appellation that seems to have appeared for the first time in 1806. The hypotheses invoked over time as to the origin(s) of mayonnaise have been numerous and contradictory. Most hypotheses do however agree on the geographic origin of the sauce: Mahón in Menorca, Spain during the occupation by French troops in the Seven Years' War. Other theories have been dismissed by some authors as being somewhat a retrospective invention aiming to credit the sauce as an invention of southwestern France, when, most likely, its origin can be found in the port city of Menorca.

Mayonnaise sauce may have its origins in the ancient remoulade. Another hypothesis is that mayonnaise is derived from aioli. Finally, the process of emulsifying egg yolk was known for a long time to pharmacists, who used it to prepare ointments and salves. Some have pointed out that it would make sense that mayonnaise originated in Spain given its requirement of olive oil, a liquid produced and consumed mostly there at the time. This hypothesis is similar to another that places the origins of French fries in Spain using the same rationale.

In 1750, Francesc Roger Gomila, a Valencian friar, published a recipe for a sauce similar to mayonnaise in Art de la Cuina ('Art of the Kitchen'). He calls the sauce aioli bo. If he does not describe precisely the recipe—suggesting that it was known by everyone on the island—the way it is used, the preparations for which it is used as a base and the dishes with which it is associated are most often inconceivable with an aioli. Earlier recipes of similar emulsified sauces, usually containing garlic, appear in a number of Spanish recipe books dating back to the 14th-century Llibre de Sent Soví, where it is called all-i-oli, literally 'garlic and oil' in Catalan. This sauce had clearly spread throughout the Crown of Aragon, for Juan de Altamiras gives a recipe for it in his celebrated 1745 recipe book Nuevo Arte de Cocinar ('New Art of Cooking').

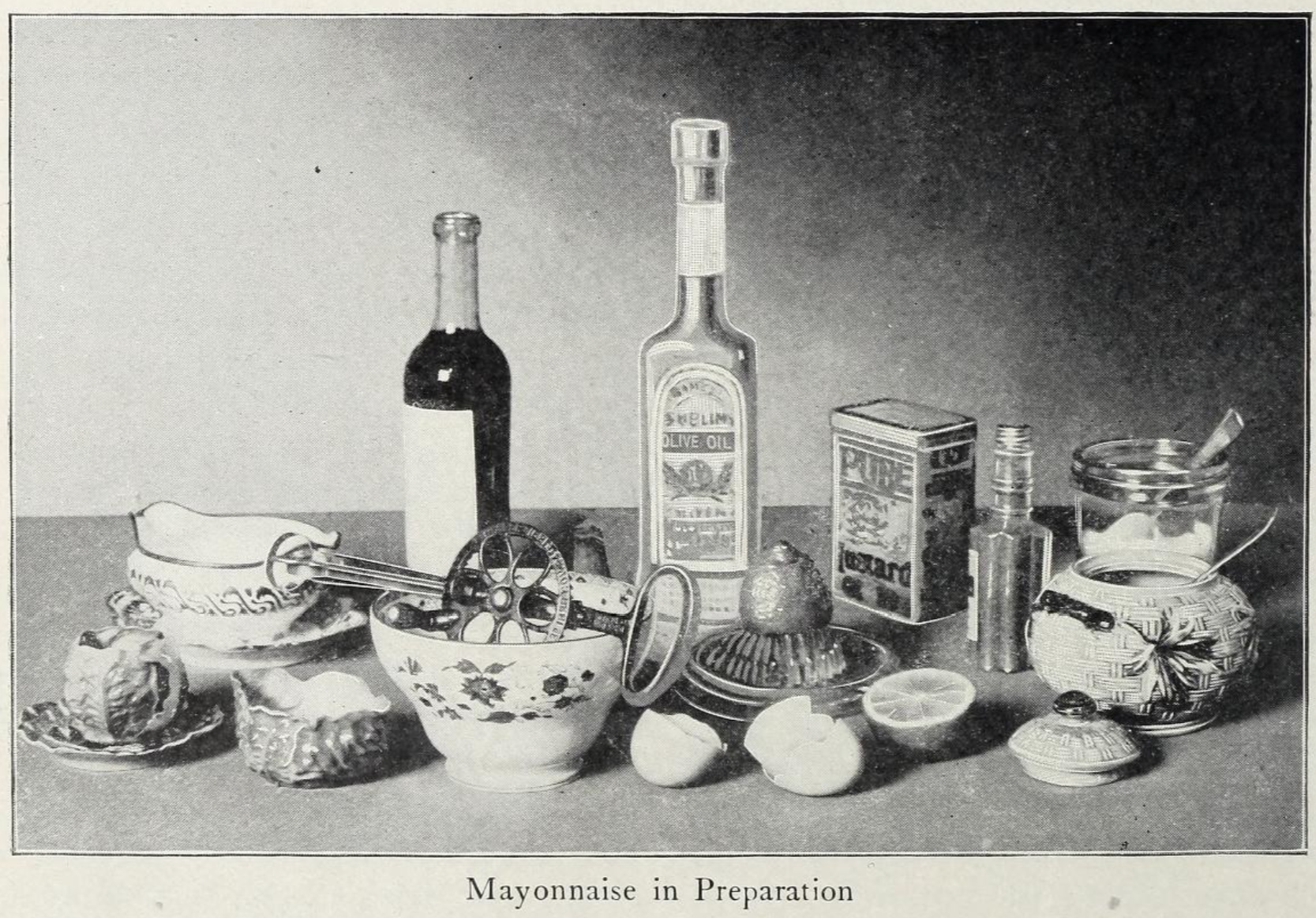
Mayonnaise in Preparation (1903)

On April 18, 1756, the Duke of Richelieu invaded Menorca and took the port of Mahon. A theory states that the aioli bo sauce was thereafter adopted by the cook of the Duke of Richelieu, who upon his return to France made the sauce famous in the French court. which would have been known as mahonnaise. A number of legends arose relating how the Duke of Richelieu first tried the sauce, including his discovery of the sauce in a local inn of Mahon where he would have allegedly asked the innkeeper to make him some dinner during the siege of Mahon, and even that he invented it himself as a quick garnish.

Another version is Grimod de La Reynière's 1808 bayonnaise sauce which is a sort of aspic: "But if one wants to make from this cold chicken, a dish of distinction, one composes a bayonnaise, whose green jelly, of a good consistency, forms the most worthy ornament of poultry and fish salads."

In 1806, André Viard, in Le Cuisinier Impérial, transformed this recipe for remoulade by replacing the roux with egg yolk. In another recipe, an Indian remoulade, without mustard, he specifies that the binding is facilitated by incorporating the oil little by little. This is the first modern mention of a stable cold emulsified sauce.

It is only in 1815 that Antonin Carême mentions a cold "magnonaise" emulsified with egg yolk. The word "mayonnaise" is attested in English in 1815. Auguste Escoffier wrote that mayonnaise was a French mother sauce of cold sauces.

== Etymology ==
A common theory is that it is named for Mahón (Maó in Catalan), itself named after its founder Mago Barca, in Menorca, in honor of the 3rd Duke of Richelieu's victory over the British in 1756, and in fact the name mahonnaise is used by some authors. But the name is only attested several decades after that event. One version of this theory says that it was originally known as salsa mahonesa in Spanish, but that spelling too is only attested later.

Alexandre Balthazar Laurent Grimod de La Reynière, a lawyer by qualification who acquired fame during the reign of Napoleon for his sensual and public gastronomic lifestyle, rejected the name mayonnaise because the word "is not French". He also rejected the name mahonnaise because Mahón "is not known for good food", and thus he preferred bayonnaise, after the city of Bayonne, which "has many innovative gourmands and... produces the best hams in Europe." Indeed, the city of Bayonne (sauce à la Bayonnaise) could also have given its name to this type of sauce, by spelling deformation. This form would seem to be confirmed by the fact that there is no written record of the sauce à la mayonnaise before the beginning of the 19th century, long after the capture of the city of Mahón.

Another hypothesis is based, according to Marie-Antoine Carême, a famous contemporary French chef, on a derivative of magnonaise (from the verb magner, or manier) or, according to Prosper Montagné, of moyeunaise (or moyennaise), based on moyeu(x) (or moyen) which means 'egg yolk', in Old French. It has also been suggested that the word be linked to the old verb mailler, meaning 'to beat'.

Joseph Favre, for his part, states in his memoirs that mayonnaise is an alteration of the word magnonnaise, derived from Magnon (Lot-et-Garonne), and that a cook from Magnon would have popularized it first in the South of France; he notes that this sauce has been variously named mahonnaise, bayonnaise and mayonnaise.

== Preparation ==
Recipes for mayonnaise date to the early nineteenth century. In 1815, Louis Eustache Ude wrote:

No 58.—Mayonnaise. Take three spoonfuls of Allemande, six ditto of aspic, and two of oil. Add a little tarragon vinegar, that has not boiled, some pepper and salt, and minced ravigotte, or merely some parsley. Then put in the members of fowl, or fillets of soles, &c. Your mayonnaise must be put to ice; neither are you to put the members into your sauce till it begins to freeze. Next dish your meat or fish, mask with the sauce before it be quite frozen, and garnish your dish with whatever you think proper, as beet root, jelly, nasturtiums, &c.

In an 1820 work, Viard describes something like the more familiar emulsified version:

This sauce is made to "take" in many ways: with raw egg yolks, with gelatine, with veal or veal brain glaze. The most common method is to take a raw egg yolk in a small terrine, with a little salt and lemon juice: take a wooden spoon, turn it while letting a trickle of oil fall and stirring constantly; as your sauce thickens, add a little vinegar; put in too a pound of good oil: serve your sauce with good salt: serve it white or green, adding green of ravigote or green of spinach. This sauce is used for cold fish entrees, or salad of vegetables cooked in salt water.

In February 1856, the Huddersfield Chronicle and West Yorkshire Advertiser published a recipe for homemade mayonnaise in a segment entitled "The Housewife's Corner." This recipe included six egg yolks, half a bottle of olive oil (volume not otherwise defined) and one-half teaspoon of vinegar. The serving suggestion was to pour this over roast chicken or turkey, with garnish of lettuce and hard eggs.

Modern mayonnaise can be made by hand with a whisk, a fork, or with the aid of an electric mixer or blender. It is made by slowly adding oil to an egg yolk, while whisking vigorously to disperse the oil. The oil and the water in the yolk form a base of the emulsion, while lecithin and protein from the yolk is the emulsifier that stabilizes it. A combination of van der Waals interactions and electrostatic repulsion determine the bond strength among oil droplets. The high viscosity of mayonnaise is attributed to the total strength created by these two intermolecular forces. Addition of mustard contributes to the taste and further stabilizes the emulsion, as mustard contains small amounts of lecithin. If vinegar is added directly to the yolk, it can emulsify more oil, thus making more mayonnaise.

For large-scale preparation of mayonnaise where mixing equipment is being employed, the process typically begins with the dispersal of eggs, either powdered or liquid, into water. Once emulsified, the remaining ingredients are then added and vigorously mixed until completely hydrated and evenly dispersed. Oil is then added as rapidly as it can be absorbed. Though only a small part of the total, ingredients other than the oil are critical to proper formulation. These must be totally hydrated and dispersed within a small liquid volume, which can cause difficulties including emulsion breakdown during the oil-adding phase. Often, a long agitation process is required to achieve proper dispersal/emulsification, presenting one of the trickiest phases of the production process. As food technology advances processing has been shortened drastically, allowing about 1000 liters to be produced in 10 minutes.

=== Imitations ===
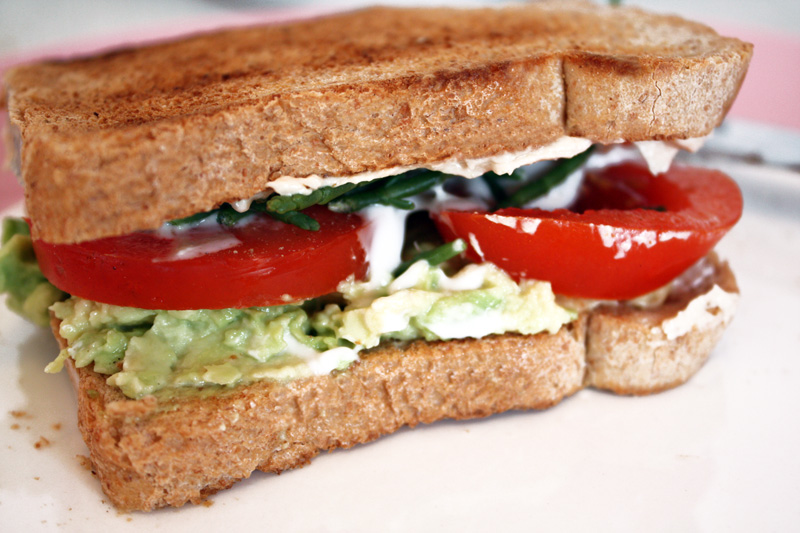
A vegan sandwich with egg-free variety of mayonnaise

Miracle Whip was developed as a less expensive imitation of mayonnaise. Lacking sufficient oil, it does not meet the legal definition of mayonnaise, and so is marketed as salad dressing.

=== Egg-free versions ===
Egg-free versions of mayonnaise are available for vegans and others who avoid eggs or cholesterol, or who have egg allergies. In the U.S., these versions cannot be labelled as "mayonnaise" because the FDA definition of mayonnaise requires egg. Egg-free versions generally contain soya or pea protein as the emulsifying agent to stabilize oil droplets in water. Well-known brands include Nasoya's Nayonaise, Vegenaise and Just Mayo in North America, and Plamil Egg Free in the United Kingdom.

== Uses ==
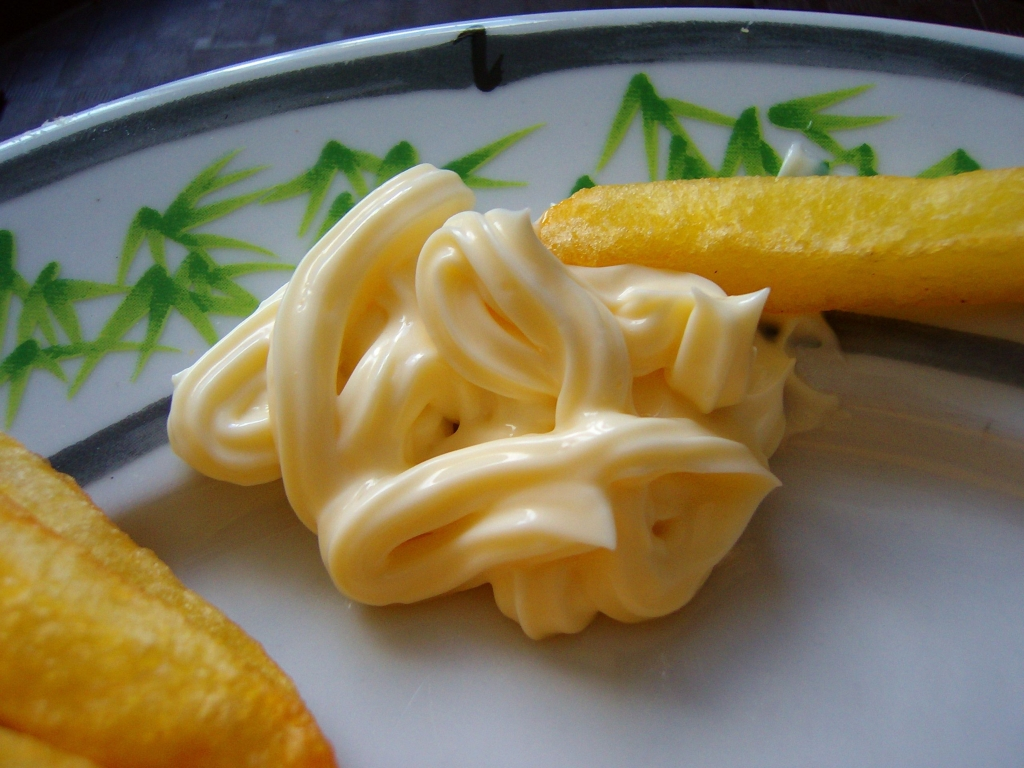
Mayonnaise from the Zaan district, North Holland, Netherlands and potato fries, though a mayonaise variety called frietsaus is more frequently used on French fries.

Mayonnaise is used commonly around the world, and is also a base for many other chilled sauces and salad dressings. For example, sauce rémoulade, in classic French cuisine, is a mix of mayonnaise and mustard, gherkins, capers, parsley, chervil, tarragon, and possibly anchovy essence.

Chile is the world's third major per capita consumer of mayonnaise and first in Latin America. Commercial mayonnaise became widely accessible in the 1980s.

Guidelines issued in September 1991 by Europe's Federation of the Condiment Sauce Industries recommend that mayonnaise should contain at least 70% oil and 5% liquid egg yolk. The Netherlands incorporated this guideline in 1998 into the law Warenwetbesluit Gereserveerde aanduidingen in article 4. Most available brands easily exceed these targets. In countries influenced by French culture, mustard is also a common ingredient that acts as an additional emulsifier.

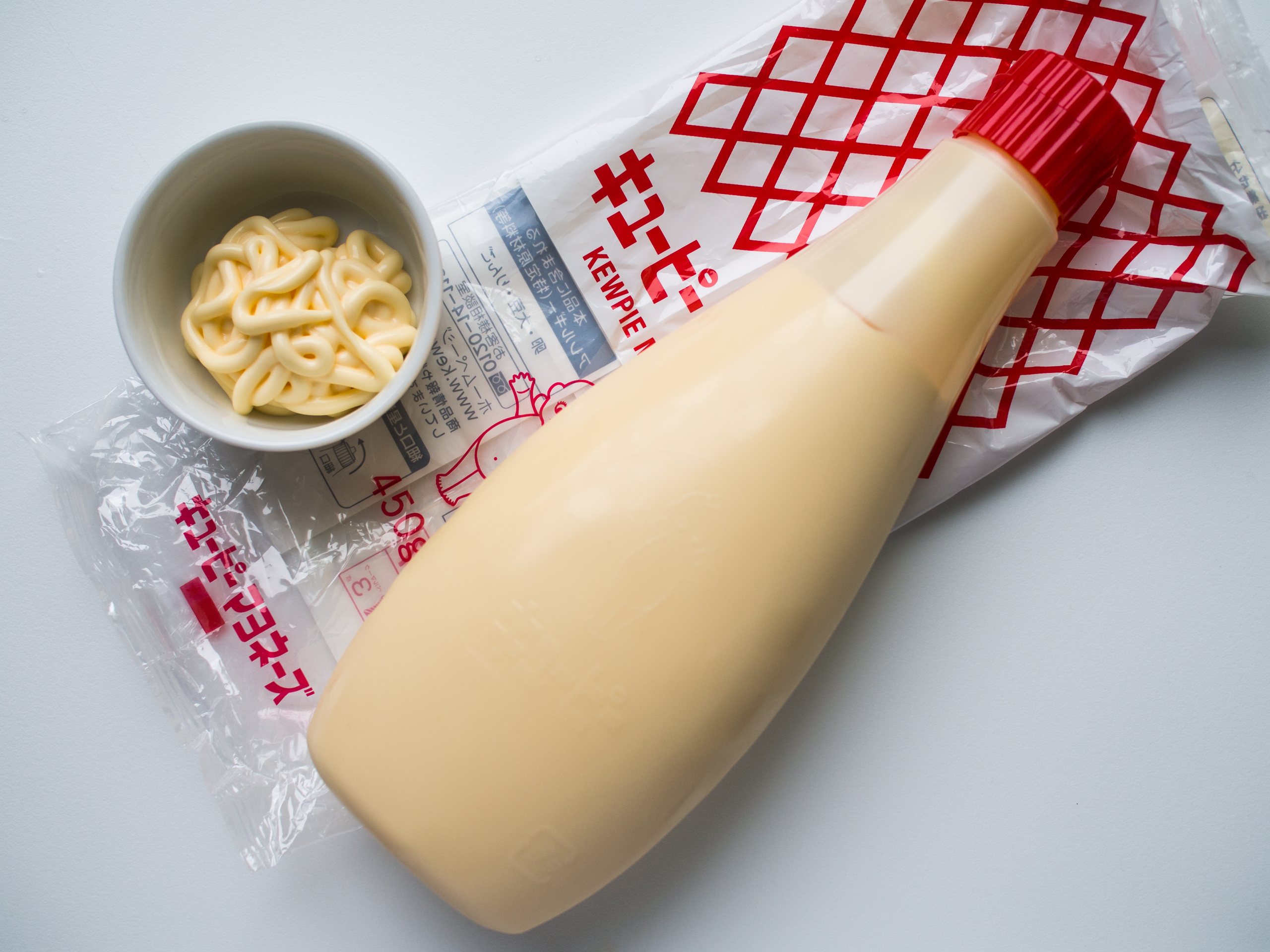
Kewpie mayonnaise

Japanese mayonnaise is typically made with rice vinegar, which gives it a flavor different from mayonnaise made from distilled vinegar. Apart from salads, it is popular with dishes such as okonomiyaki, takoyaki and yakisoba and may also accompany katsu and karaage. It is most often sold in soft plastic squeeze bottles. Its texture is thicker than most Western commercial mayonnaise. Kewpie (Q.P.) is the most popular brand of Japanese mayonnaise, advertised with a Kewpie doll logo. The vinegar is a proprietary blend containing apple and malt vinegars. The Kewpie company was started in 1925 by Tochiro Nakashima, whose goal was to create a condiment that made eating vegetables more enjoyable.

Mayonnaise is very popular in Russia, where it is made with sunflower oil and soybean oil. A 2004 study showed that Russia is the only market in Europe where more mayonnaise than ketchup is sold. It is used as a sauce in the most popular salads in Russia, such as Olivier salad (also known as Russian salad), dressed herring, and many others. Leading brands are Calvé (marketed by Unilever) and Sloboda (marketed by Efko).

Commercial mayonnaise marketed in jars originated in Philadelphia in 1907 when Amelia Schlorer began marketing a mayonnaise recipe originally used in salads sold in her family's grocery store. Mrs. Schlorer's mayonnaise was an instant success with local customers and eventually grew into the Schlorer Delicatessen Company. Around the same time in New York City, a family from Vetschau, Germany, at Richard Hellmann's delicatessen on Columbus Avenue, featured his wife's homemade recipe in salads sold in their delicatessen. The condiment quickly became so popular that Hellmann began selling it in "wooden boats" that were used for weighing butter. In 1912, Mrs. Hellmann's mayonnaise was mass-marketed and was trademarked in 1926 as Hellmann's Blue Ribbon Mayonnaise. After numerous corporate iterations, it is sold as Hellmann's in the Eastern United States and as Best Foods Mayonnaise in the Western United States. Mayonnaise sales are about US$1.3 billion per year in the U.S.

== Nutritional information ==
A typical formulation for commercially made mayonnaise (not low fat) can contain as much as 80% vegetable oil, typically soybean, rapeseed, sunflower, or corn oil, depending on region of production, but, in specialty products, sometimes olive or avocado oil. Water makes up about 7% to 8% and egg yolks about 6%. Some formulas use whole eggs instead of just yolks. The remaining ingredients include vinegar (4%), salt (1%), and sugar (1%). Low-fat formulas will typically decrease oil content to just 50% and increase water content to about 35%. Egg content is reduced to 4% and vinegar to 3%. Sugar is increased to 1.5% and salt lowered to 0.7%. Gums or thickeners (4%) are added to increase viscosity, improve texture, and ensure a stable emulsion. Mayonnaise is prepared using several methods, but on average it contains around 700 kilocalories (2,900 kJ) per 100 grams, or 94 kilocalories (Cal) per tablespoon. This makes mayonnaise a calorically dense food.

== Foodborne illness risk ==
Mayonnaise, both commercially processed and home-made, has been associated with illnesses from Salmonella globally. The source of the Salmonella has been confirmed to be raw eggs. Several outbreaks with fatal cases have been recorded, with a few major incidents. In a 1955 outbreak in Denmark, 10,000 people were affected by Salmonella from contaminated mayonnaise made by a large kitchen. The pH of the mayonnaise was found to be 5.1, with Salmonella counts of 180,000 CFU/g. The second outbreak, also in Denmark, caused 41 infections with two fatalities. The pH of the contaminated mayonnaise was 6.0, with Salmonella counts of 6 million CFU/g. In 1976 there were serious salmonellosis outbreaks on four flights to and from Spain which caused 500 cases and six fatalities. In 1984 in the US, 404 people became ill and nine died in a New York City hospital due to hospital-prepared mayonnaise. In all salmonellosis cases, the major reason was inadequate acidification of the mayonnaise, with a pH higher than the recommended upper limit of 4.1, with acetic acid as the main acidifying agent. Some brands use pasteurized eggs which would reduce this risk factor.

== See also ==
- Fritessaus
- Joppiesaus
- Peri-peri, added to mayo to make perinaise
- Salad cream
- List of condiments
- List of common dips
- List of mayonnaises
- List of sauces
