= NewPrinces =

Italian multinational food processing conglomerate corporation

NewPrinces S.p.A.
- Formerly: Newlat Food S.p.A.
- Type: Public
- Traded as: BIT: NWL
- Industry: Food processing
- Founded: 2004; 22 years ago, in Reggio Emilia, Italy
- Headquarters: Reggio Emilia, Italy
- Area served: Worldwide
- Key people: Stefano Cometto (co-CEO); Angelo Mastrolia (co-CEO)
- Products: canned vegetables; canned fish; edible oils; juices; soft drinks; milk and dairy products: fresh milk and UHT milk, cream, yogurt, mascarpone, ricotta, spreadable cheese, plant-based milk; pasta; tinned tomatoes; instant noodles; bakery products: rusks, croutons, crackers; dietetic food
- Revenue: ▲€1,641.1 million (2024)
- Operating income: ▲€197.7 million (2024)
- Net income: ▲€160.2 million (2024)
- Number of employees: 8,800 (2025)
- Subsidiaries: Princes Group; Centrale del Latte d'Italia (67.74%)
- Website: www.newprinces.it/en

NewPrinces S.p.A. is an Italian multinational food processing conglomerate corporation headquartered in Reggio Emilia, Italy. NewPrinces S.p.A. operates as a subsidiary of Newlat Group S.A.

In 2025, NewPrinces S.p.A. is listed on the Euronext STAR Milan index of Borsa Italiana. As of July 28, 2025, NewPrinces has a market capitalization of €898,093,931 million.

== History ==
The Newlat S.p.A was founded in 2004 within the Parmalat group.

In 2008, the Italian Antitrust Authority forced Parmalat to sell it for the symbolic price of one euro plus debts. On April 18, 2008, Parmalat completed the sale of 100% of Newlat S.p.A. to TMT Finance SA, founded by Angelo Mastrolia.

In 2020, Newlat Food S.p.A. acquired the majority stake of the shares of Centrale del Latte d'Italia S.p.A.

Newlat Food S.p.A. acquired Princes Group in July 2024.

On April 28, 2025, the shareholders' meeting of Newlat Food S.p.A. approved the name change to NewPrinces S.p.A.

As of May 8, 2025, NewPrinces S.p.A holds a majority stake of 67.74% of the shares of Centrale del Latte d'Italia S.p.A.

On July 10, 2025, NewPrinces S.p.A. purchased the Plasmon biscuit brand from the American company Kraft Heinz for 120 million euros.

On July 24, 2025, NewPrinces S.p.A. signed a binding agreement worth €1 billion to acquire the operations of Carrefour Italy. Under the terms of the agreement, the NewPrinces group will acquire all Carrefour-branded businesses and stores still operating in Italy, committing to their development. The agreement also stipulates that the Carrefour brand will remain present for at least the next three years, after which it will be replaced by the historic Italian brand GS, which had made way for the Carrefour brand. In 2025, combined revenues of approximately €7 billion are expected.

The Italian government, through Minister for Business and Made in Italy, Adolfo Urso, also welcomed the combination, which guarantees the return of an Italian player in food distribution and the strengthening of the food production sector, while guaranteeing full employment for Italian workers, who were seriously at risk with Carrefour Italy's divestment plan.

In August 2025, it was reported that the company was seeking a primary listing on the London Stock Exchange at a valuation of around £700 million. NewPrinces stated that Carrefour Italy's operations will be placed in a subsidiary, and that NewPrinces will continue its plans for a potential listing of its production unit on the London Stock Exchange.

On 3 October 2025, NewPrinces confirmed the launch of the listing process for its subsidiary Princes Group by way of an initial public offering on the London Stock Exchange.

On 22 October 2025, full details of the Princes Group IPO were published. The directors hoped to achieve a market capitalisation of £1.24 billion. However, the shares were priced at a level which some analysts considered would undervalue Princes Group: this led to a fall in the share price of NewPrinces of more than 20%.

== Main shareholders ==
The main shareholders of NewPrinces S.p.A. on 23 May 2025 are:

Name	%
Newlat Group SA	41.14 %
Other shareholders	34.51 %
Mitsubishi Corporation	14.38 %
Helikon Investments	9.53 %
Own shares	0.44 %
