= Sarson's =

Malt vinegar brand

- Product type: Vinegar
- Current owner: Mizkan
- Country: United Kingdom
- Introduced: 1794
- Previous owners: Crosse & Blackwell; Nestlé; Premier Foods
- Website: sarsons.co.uk

Sarson's is a brand of malt vinegar owned by the Japanese vinegar manufacturer Mizkan. It is brewed in the United Kingdom and sold in pear-shaped bottles with a flip top under the Sarson's name. The vinegar is also produced for sale under other brands, including Sainsbury's, 3663, Chef, Independent and Mizkan itself.

== History ==
Thomas Sarson first brewed vinegar from malt barley in 1794. James Thomas Sarson was a vinegar maker living at Brunswick Place, Shoreditch in 1841. Sales increased when his son Henry James Sarson took over. The product was renamed "Sarson's Virgin Vinegar" in 1884, referencing the Bible story of The Wise and Foolish Virgins by which he was inspired rather than the purity of the product, but this name was soon dropped. In 1893, the company was trading under the name of Henry Sarson and Sons from "The Vinegar Works", Catherine Street, City Road, Shoreditch, London. Two of Henry's sons, Henry Logsdail Sarson and Percival Stanley Sarson also joined the family business as vinegar brewers.

The Sarson's Vinegar factory was situated in Tanner Street in Bermondsey, London, on the southern approach to Tower Bridge, where the aroma of the vinegar could be smelt.

In 1932 the company merged with other British vinegar producers to form British Vinegars Ltd. In 1968, British Vinegars purchased a site from the Co-op in Middleton, Greater Manchester and production moved there.

The Tanner Street factory was closed, and the building and factory were used for storage. Starting in 2000, parts of the site were redeveloped for flats. Old and new parts of the factory were subsequently merged to form new buildings and offices. Remaining buildings were removed. There was also an additional factory in Stourport-on-Severn, which is now closed.

The company was taken over by Crosse & Blackwell which in turn was taken over by Nestlé and sold to Premier Foods. Premier Foods agreed in July 2012 to sell its Sarson's, Haywards pickled onion and Dufrais vinegar brands to Mizkan – a 200-year-old vinegar manufacturer in Japan – for £41m as part of a streamlining programme.

== Advertising ==
A print of a cartoon dates from 1893 entitled "The Irony of Circumstance", featuring 'acetic faced women' in front of sign which reads "Virgin Vinegar".

A Sarson's Virgin Vinegar colour advertisement postcard survives from the 1900s for a campaign entitled "She would have Sarsons". From the 1930s and 1940s there is a photograph of a Sarson's vinegar truck and 49 photographs of the works, in a collection created by British Vinegars Limited and are held in the London Metropolitan Archives.

The slogan used to advertise the product is "Don't say vinegar – say Sarson's".

== Varieties ==
- Malt and Distilled Vinegar
- Lemon Vinegar
- Light Malt Vinegar
- Pickling Strength Malt Vinegar

=== Other products ===
- Worcester sauce
- Soy sauce
- Gravy browning
