= Crisp 'n Dry =

Brand of rapeseed oil

Crisp 'n Dry is a brand of rapeseed oil manufactured by Edible Oils Limited and marketed by Princes Group. The manufacturer claims this vegetable oil leaves food dry after frying (hence its name Crisp 'n Dry), compared to other vegetable oils which require the fried food to be dried with kitchen paper to absorb excess oil.

Crisp 'n Dry was previously marketed by Spry (Lever Brothers), then Unilever, before being acquired by Princes Group.

Crisp 'n Dry contains no cholesterol and the block of Crisp 'n Dry no longer contains trans fat.

A long running advertising campaign for Crisp 'n Dry stated no matter what day of the week, it can turn any day into a fry day.

== Products ==
The Crisp 'n Dry product rang typically includes:

- Liquid oil
- Spray cooking oil
- Crispy 'n Dry Solid Block

== See also ==
- Vegetable oil
- Sunflower oil
- Rapeseed oil
