= Princes Group =

International food and drink group

Princes Group plc

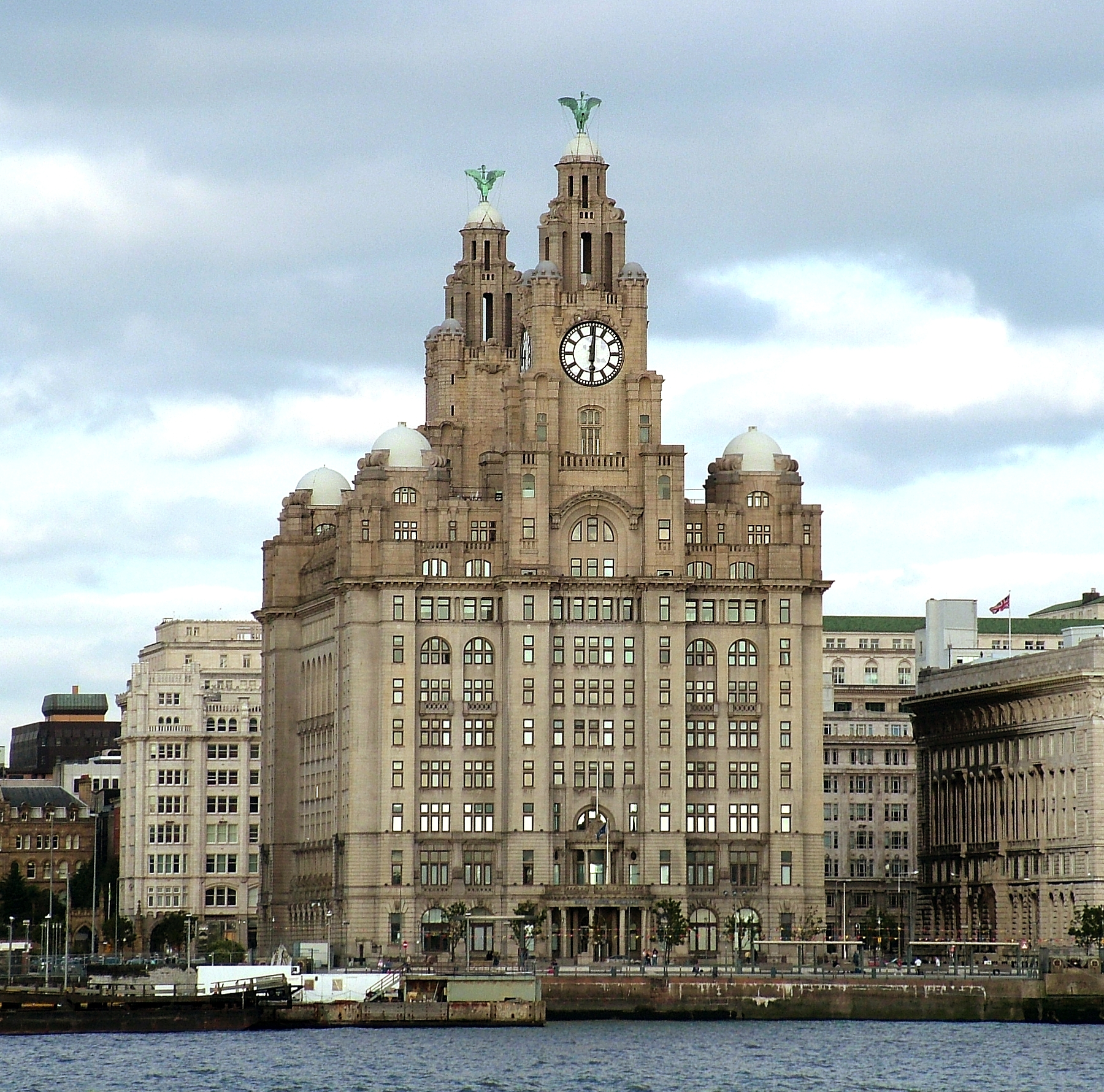
- Royal Liver Building, Liverpool
- Formerly: Princes Limited (1989-2025)
- Type: Public company
- Traded as: LSE: PRN
- Industry: Food & Drink
- Founded: 1880; 146 years ago, in Liverpool, England
- Founders: William M. Simpson; Frank Roberts
- Headquarters: Royal Liver Building, Liverpool, England
- Number of locations: 11 production sites worldwide
- Area served: Worldwide
- Key people: Angelo Mastrolia (chair); Simon Harrison (CEO)
- Products: Fish, meat, fruit, vegetables, soups, pastes, pasta, cooking sauces, edible oils and soft drinks
- Revenue: ▲£1,871.5 million (2025)
- Operating income: ▲£76.0 million (2025)
- Net income: ▲£37.1 million (2025)
- Owner: NewPrinces (82.7%)
- Number of employees: 7,000 (2025)
- Website: princesgroup.com

Princes Group plc is an international food and drink group involved in the manufacture, import and distribution of branded and customer own-brand products. Founded in 1880 and headquartered in Liverpool, England, it is listed on the London Stock Exchange and is a constituent of the FTSE 250 Index.

== History ==
The firm was founded in 1880 as a partnership by Briton William Muirhead Simpson (1842-1926) and Canadian Frank Roberts (1853-1938) and initially imported tinned lobster from Canada. It operated as Simpson Roberts, then created brands including Maypole (1891), Mikado (1895) and Princes (1900). By 1915, Simpson Roberts was the world's largest exporter of lobster, handling one third of the world's lobster trade. In 1919, the partnership was incorporated as a limited company.

The company first entered continental Europe in 1960 and changed its name to Princes Foods in 1962.

In 1964, Princes was acquired by 'Trex' manufacturer J Bibby & Sons. In 1973, the combined business was sold to Italy's Buitoni group, which, in 1988 was acquired by Nestlé, with Princes then sold to Mitsubishi Corporation in 1989.

As a wholly owned subsidiary of Mitsubishi, Princes completed several high-profile mergers and acquisitions that added significant scale to the business. In 2011 Princes acquired two East Anglian canning operations and the Crosse & Blackwell and Farrow's brands. In 2012 Princes Industrie Alimentari S.r.L. (PIA) was created and a processing factory in Foggia, Italy was acquired. By 2013, the company was the UK's largest supplier of tinned food.

In 2015 Princes Tuna (Mauritius) completed an agreement to create an enlarged tuna processing operation.

In 2018 Princes announced a business review after net profits fell to £0.5m; in October 2018, Princes announced factories in Manchester and Chichester would close. By 2020, the company employed 7,000 people globally, 2,200 of them in UK.

However, in January 2023, Mitsubishi was reported to be considering selling the Princes Group, and in March 2023 potential buyers, including Bain Capital-backed Valeo Foods and the Aurelius Group investment firm, were reported to be considering bids of around £400M.

In May 2024, Mitsubishi Corporation agreed to sell the business to Italian-based Newlat Food S.p.A ('Newlat'), encompassing all current operations and brands in an agreement valued at £700m. The purchase was completed in July 2024. In April 2025, Newlat Foods S.p.A. changed its name to NewPrinces S.p.A.

Princes Group was the subject of an initial public offering on the London Stock Exchange, valuing the company at £1.2 billion, in October 2025.

== Headquarters ==
Princes Group has its headquarters at the Royal Liver Building in Liverpool. It has been based in the Liverpool landmark since 1982, with approximately 400 staff based there. Originally Princes Group was a tenant in the building, along with other companies. In July 2025 Princes Group announced that it had bought the Royal Liver Building outright in a £60 million deal. The company said that it would expand the use of the building to include external events, while maintaining existing arrangements with the other tenants for the time being.

== Operations ==
Princes' customers include major supermarkets, convenience stores, foodservice operators, wholesale suppliers and other food manufacturers. Its brands and products span over 20 different categories including fish, meat, fruit, vegetables, soups, pastes, pasta, cooking sauces, edible oils and a broad range of soft drinks sectors.

=== Owned and operated brands ===
Brands (*= licensed brands) which Princes manufacture and produce include:

- Batchelors Peas* – a brand that dates back to 1895 with a range that includes canned soups and peas (under licence from Premier Foods)
- Branston Beans* – a brand well known for its store cupboard favourites such as baked beans and spaghetti in tomato sauce (under licence from Mizkan)
- Crisp 'n Dry – popular UK vegetable oil brand
- Crosse & Blackwell - canned food brand that includes favourites such as baked beans, soups, pasta, vegetables and ready meals
- Farrow's – British-grown giant marrowfat processed peas
- Flora* – popular sunflower oil brand
- Jucee – popular squash drinks brand
- Mazola - corn and speciality oil brand. Range includes corn, peanut, grapeseed, rapeseed and sunflower oils
- Napolina - Italian-style ingredients brand. Range includes sun-ripened tomatoes to fruity olive oils, pasta and pasta sauces, as well as more specialist grated cheese, pulses and pizza products
- Olivio* - cooking oil first launched in 1991, made with a blend of vegetable and olive oils
- Princes – the Princes range now includes over 350 food and drink products including canned fish, meat, fruit and vegetables, microwavable ready meals, sandwich fillings and soft drinks
- Trex – home baking brand which is a dairy-free alternative to butter
- Vier Diamanten – popular Austrian canned fish brand
- Wielkopolski – cooking oil used for frying, baking, salad dressings, and in cakes and desserts

=== Production sites ===
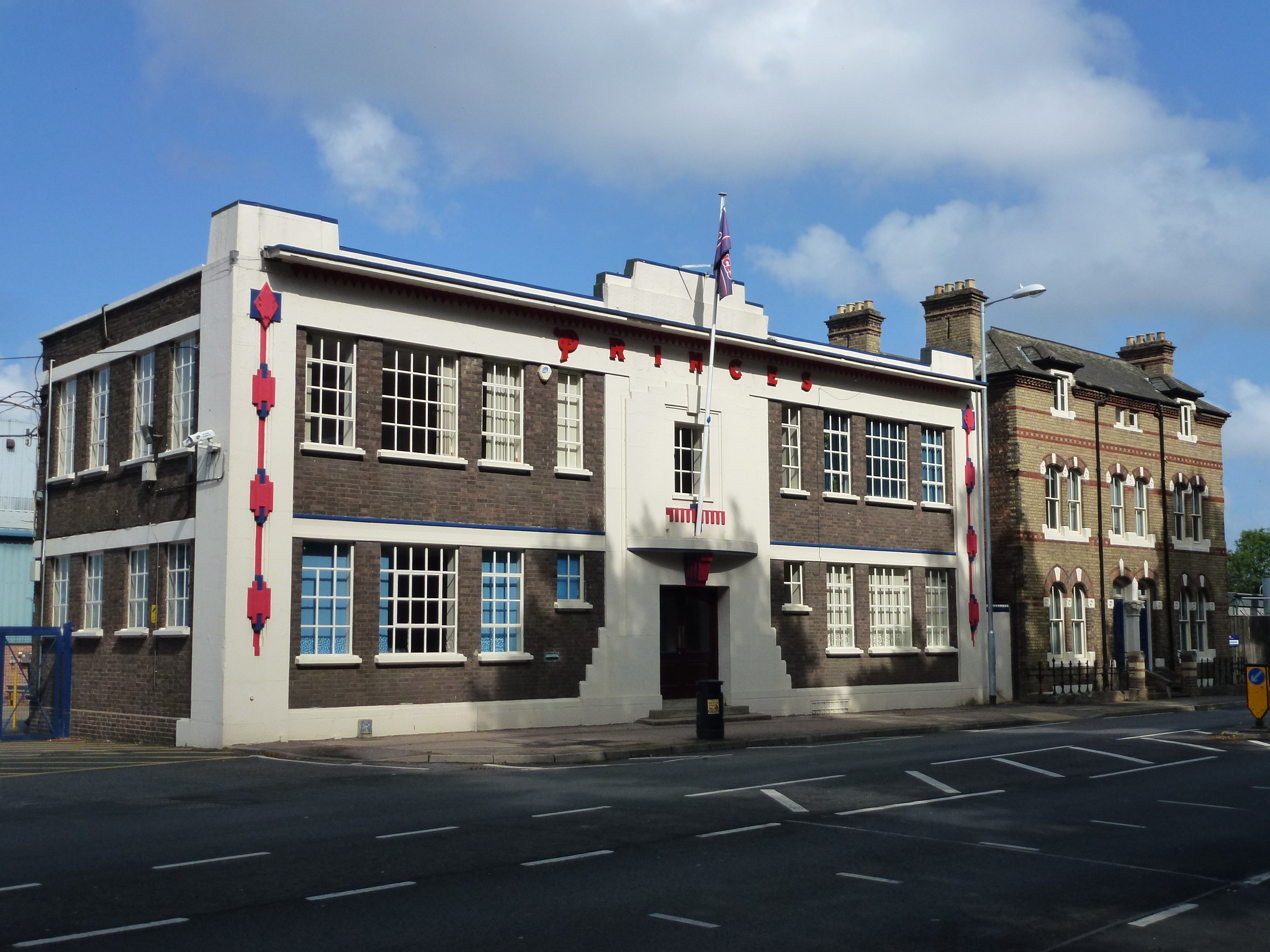
Listed Art Deco factory building in Wisbech, Cambridgeshire

Princes operates 11 production sites situated in the UK, mainland Europe and Mauritius:

==== UK food sites ====
- Long Sutton, Lincolnshire – this site produces a range of canned products including baked beans, vegetables, fruit, pulses, pies, pasta, meatballs and ready meals
- Wisbech – located in Cambridgeshire, this site produces canned and pouch products including baked beans, soups, pulses, pasta, vegetables and sauces.

==== UK soft drinks sites ====
- Cardiff – produces juice products in cartons
- Bradford – this site produces squash and carbonated soft drinks
- Glasgow – supplies canned soft drinks

==== UK edible oils ====
- Belvedere, London – located in south east London, this site produces olive and speciality oils
- Erith – located in south east London, this site produces cooking oil

==== International ====
- Foggia, Italy – this factory is one of the most modern and efficient ambient tomato processing facilities in Europe
- Riche Terre, Port Louis, Mauritius – one of the most technologically advanced tuna processing facilities in the world
- Marine Road, Port Louis, Mauritius - a major processing facility producing tuna loins
- Szamotuły, Poland – located in the north west region of Wielkopolska, this site primarily produces rapeseed oil.
