= Crosse & Blackwell =

British food brand

- Formerly: West and Wyatt
- Type: Private (1706–1960)
- Industry: Food
- Founded: 1706; 320 years ago
- Fate: Acquired by Nestlé, becoming a brand
- Headquarters: London
- Products: Condiments, marmalades, meat sauces, seafood sauces, mincemeats, mustard, pickles, pickled onions
- Brands: List: Chutneys; Red Currant Jelly; Orange Marmalade; Fish & Chip Vinegar; Chow Chow Piccalilli
- Owner: Princes Group (UK); J.M. Smucker (US); Tiger Brands (SA)
- Website: crosseandblackwell.co.uk

Crosse & Blackwell is an English food brand. The original company was established in London in 1706, then was acquired by Edmund Crosse and Thomas Blackwell in 1830. It became independent until it was acquired by Swiss conglomerate Nestlé in 1960 and sold in 2002.

Products branded by Crosse & Blackwell include condiments, marmalades, meat sauces, seafood sauces, mincemeats, mustard, pickles and pickled onions, among others.

== History ==
=== Early history ===
Jackson's, a colonial produce business, was established in London in 1706, later becoming West & Wyatt and specialising in pickles, sauces and condiments, plus salted fish, and it held royal appointments to George III, George IV and William IV. Described as "oilmen and salters", West & Wyatt had factory premises at 11 King Street (now Shaftesbury Avenue) in Soho in 1818, packaging and supplying sweet oils, foods preserved in oil, and crystallised fruits and preserves.

In 1819, the company was joined by two apprentices: Edmund Crosse (1804–1862) and Thomas Blackwell (1804–1879). In 1830 they borrowed £600 from their families to buy the business, which became known as "Crosse & Blackwell". The company was one of the first to secure a royal warrant from Queen Victoria, in 1837.

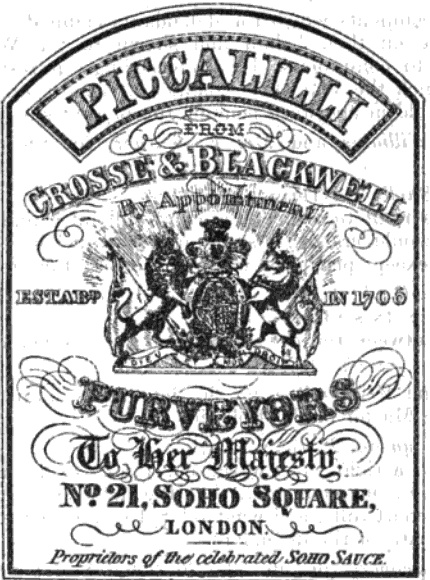
Piccalilli label as used by Crosse & Blackwell around 1867

By 1839, the company had expanded and moved its offices and shop to 20–21 Soho Square. During the following decade, it pioneered the use of celebrity chefs as endorsers and collaborators, working with Alexis Soyer from 1850 to create the tangy Soyer's Sauce, Soyer's Relish and Soyer's Sultana Sauce products. It was also a wholesaler of Lea & Perrins Worcestershire sauce.

Crosse & Blackwell opened a vinegar brewery in Caledonian Road and started pickle packing at Soho Square, described by Henry Mayhew in his 1865 book The Shops and Companies of London, and the Trades and Manufactories of Great Britain, in a report entitled "Girls in Pickle". Crosse & Blackwell also acquired a small Bermondsey canning firm, Gamble & Company, established in 1812 as Donkin, Hall and Gamble, to produce preserved fruit, vegetables and meat to supply long-distance vessels. In 1849, the company also established a plant in Cork, Ireland, to produce canned salmon.

Over the latter years of the 19th century, Crosse & Blackwell developed several buildings in Charing Cross Road, close to its Soho Square premises. In 1875–76, the company commissioned a two-storey stable complex at 111 Charing Cross Road, designed by architect Robert Lewis Roumieu. Roumieu died in 1877, but his son, Reginald St Aubyn Roumieu, trading as Roumieu & Aitchison, completed a further warehouse at 151–155 Charing Cross Road, (which remained in use until 1921) and, in 1888, designed another warehouse at 157 Charing Cross Road, which was completed in 1893. In 1927, it was redeveloped as a cinema, later the Astoria theatre and music venue. In 2010, following the Astoria's demolition to make way for the London Crossrail scheme, the remains of around 13,000 Victorian jam jars and pickle pots were recovered from a former vault of the warehouse. From 1888 until the 1920s, Crosse & Blackwell also had offices at 114–116 Charing Cross Road, again designed by Roumieu & Aitchison.

=== 20th century ===
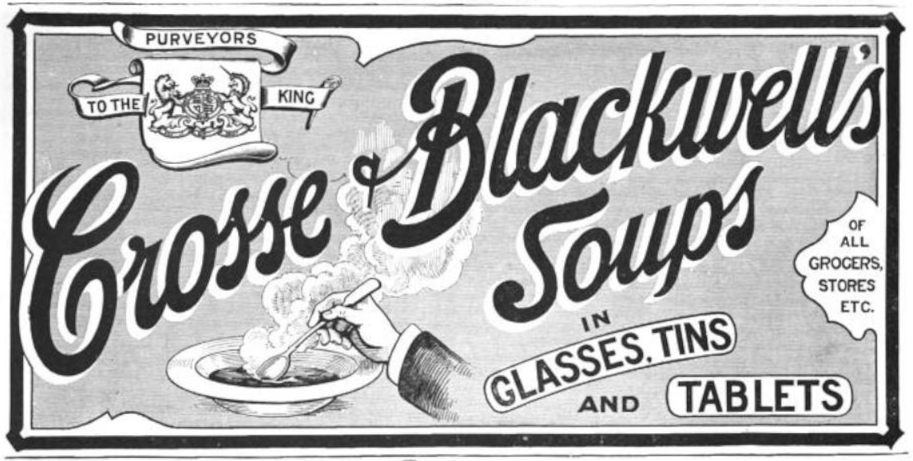
December 1903 ad in The Sketch

Before World War I, Crosse & Blackwell, a limited company since 1892, established its first factory in continental Europe, in Hamburg. After the war, in 1919, it acquired another Bermondsey-based business, sauce and pickle maker E. Lazenby & Son Ltd, and Dundee-based marmalade manufacturer James Keiller & Son Ltd in 1924. The latter had a factory at Tay Wharf in east London's Silvertown district, close to the River Thames, rail links and Henry Tate's sugar refinery.

Further acquisitions included Cosmelli Packing Company, Robert Kellie & Son, Batzer & Co, and Alexander Cairns & Sons. After World War I, Crosse & Blackwell established further factories overseas. By 1930, it had plants in Baltimore, Brussels, Buenos Aires, Paris and Toronto, as well as in the UK and Hamburg. In 1928, it acquired the largest Irish jam and confectionery producer, Williams and Woods.

==== Branston ====
In 1920, Crosse & Blackwell made a successful £612,856 bid to acquire a factory site in Branston, just outside Burton upon Trent, which they pledged to turn into the largest and best-equipped food preserving plant in the British Empire.

In 1922, the company started to produce Branston Pickle, to a recipe attributed to Mrs Caroline Graham and her daughters Evelyn and Ermentrude, at its new factory, but the factory proved uneconomic and production was moved to the Lazenby site in Crimscott Street, Bermondsey. Production at Branston ended in January 1925, leading to large scale local unemployment, and many local people boycotted Crosse & Blackwell products as a result.

The Bermondsey site was expanded with new buildings in 1924 and 1926 and remained in use until 1969.

==== Keiller ====
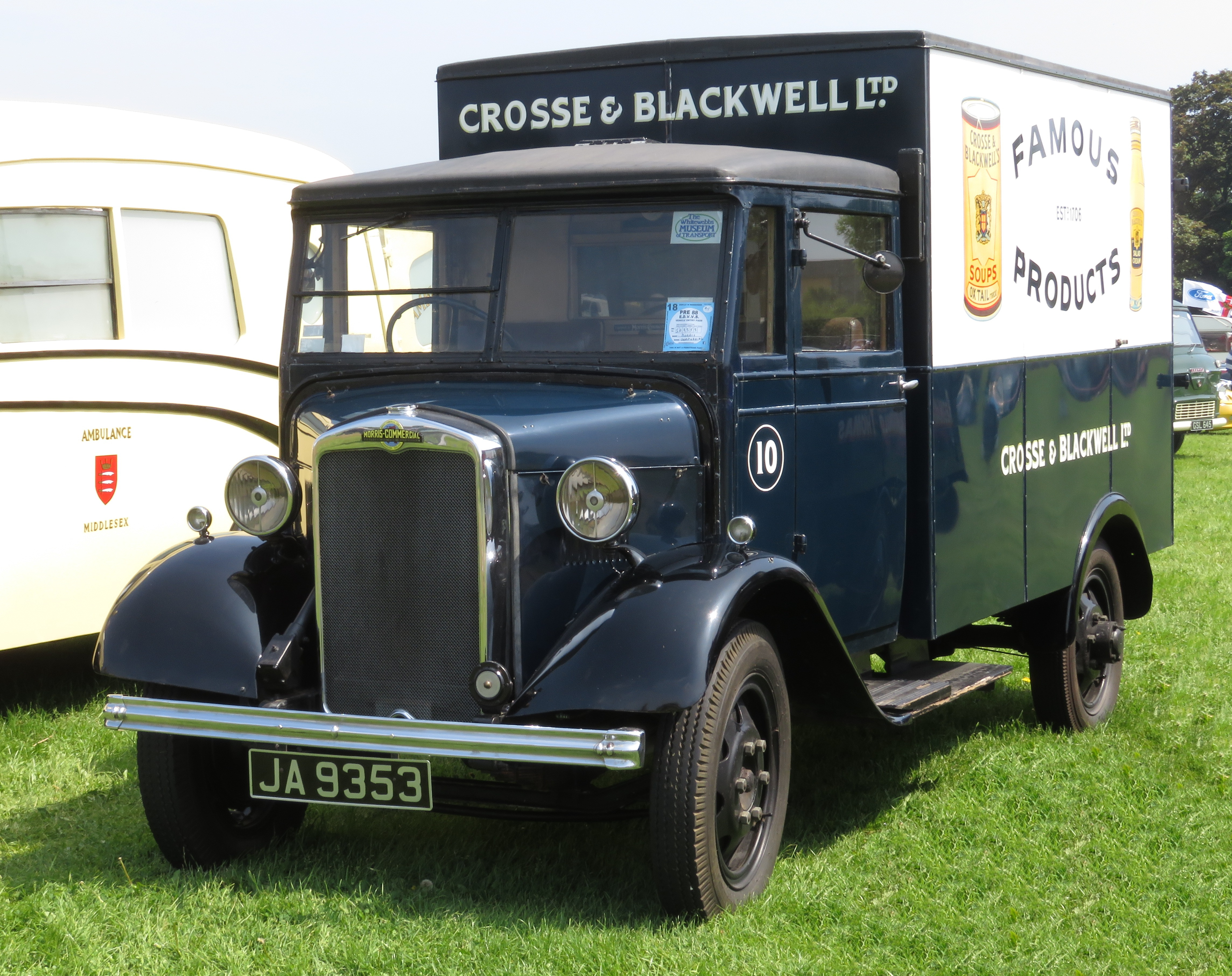
Company's delivery truck, 1937

The Keiller factory in Silvertown had been destroyed in an 1889 fire and rebuilt the following year. It continued manufacture of preserves, chocolates and confectionery until it was again destroyed, this time bombed during the first daylight air raid on London on 7 September 1940. Chocolate and confectionery work was transferred to Dundee, but preserves manufacture was eventually restarted. This then transferred to Dundee in 1956.

==== Nestlé ====
In 1960, Nestlé bought the Crosse & Blackwell Group and developed the name across a number of food categories worldwide. The acquisition increased Nestlé's output, adding 11 factories and included the largest fish-canning factory in the UK (located in Peterhead, Aberdeenshire). At the time of the acquisition, Crosse & Blackwell employed 4,700 workers in production and 1,900 other employees and salespeople. For a while, its head office was in Crown House, Morden, south-west London. The brand was later owned by Premier Foods.

A prominent member of the founder's family is Chris Blackwell, founder of Island Records.

=== 21st century ===
Nestlé divested the Crosse & Blackwell operations in 2002. Today ownership of the brand is divided between The J.M. Smucker Company in North America, Princes Group in Europe and Tiger Brands in South Africa. In Japan, the company's curry powder is still manufactured by Nestlé for food service packages of 400 g, 2 kg and 10 kg each.

== See also ==
- List of brand name condiments
- Major Grey's Chutney
