= Mazzetti =

Mazzetti is an Italian surname.

== List of people with the surname Mazzetti ==
- Annamaria Mazzetti (born 1988), an Italian triathlete
- Cocky Mazzetti (1937–2024), an Italian singer
- Germana Mazzetti (1931–2024), birth name of Italian singer Germana Caroli
- Mark Mazzetti (born 1974), an American journalist with The New York Times
- Pilar Mazzetti (born 1956), a Peruvian doctor and Minister of the Interior
- Tim Mazzetti (born 1956), a former National Football League placekicker
