= Mrs. Schlorer's =

Defunct American condiment company

Mrs. Schlorer's was the brand name for mayonnaise and numerous other food condiments originally manufactured by the Schlorer Delicatessen Company in Philadelphia, Pennsylvania. Mrs. Schlorer's Mayonnaise is credited as being the first mayonnaise put in jars and sold commercially, in 1907. The first products trademarked by the Schlorer Delicatessen Company were Mrs. Schlorer's Mayonnaise and Mrs. Schlorer's Olivenaise in 1917.

== History ==
In the early 1900s, Amelia Schlorer of Philadelphia would prepare salads including mayonnaise for church functions and other community events. In 1907, she offered twelve jars for sale in glass jelly jars with typewritten labels held on by rubber bands. They sold in less than an hour, marking the first commercial mayonnaise sold in America.

She immediately began production of her bottled mayonnaise in the family kitchen with the help of her two children. They used a European beating machine. As demand rose, the store insisted that Mrs. Schlorer improve the packaging from less of a homemade appearance. Deciding to take a risk, Amelia went to a local glass factory where the minimum purchase was 5 gross or 720 jars. The main criteria that Amelia insisted upon was that a tablespoon easily fit into the jar opening for spooning of the mayonnaise. After six years of mixing, bottling, and labeling by hand for local grocery stores and door-to-door delivery, the Schlorers formed the Schlorer Delicatessen Company which was later known as Mrs. Schlorer's, Inc.

== Company information ==
The Schlorer Delicatessen Company was formed in 1913 due to the rising demand for Mrs. Schlorer's Mayonnaise. A four-story and basement factory was built at Water and Mifflin Streets in Philadelphia. The company was owned and operated by Edward Schlorer until his death in 1928. After Edward's death, the company was operated by Edward's and Amelia's son Charles Schlorer as president and daughter Anna Schlorer Smith as treasurer.

In 1955, Mrs. Schlorer's, Inc. was sold to William H. and E. Donald Burns owners of Atlantic Syrup Refining Corp. Mrs. Schlorer's production was moved from Philadelphia to Vineland, New Jersey, at the same location of Venice Maid Company.

In 1991, the label rights were acquired by Connelly Containers, Inc. in Bala Cynwyd, Pennsylvania.

In 1998, the label rights were acquired by Good Food, Inc. in Honey Brook, Pennsylvania, where some of the products are still made today.

== Advertising ==
In 1942, Mrs. Schlorer's, Inc. copyrighted an advertising jingle used in many radio and television commercials over the next several decades in the greater Philadelphia area. The song, written by Bertram May and Billy James, helped establish some familiarity with Mrs. Schlorer's Mayonnaise as a staple when making a sandwich.

The popular song lyrics went:

"I'm a sandwich man,
I'm a sandwich man,
I can make a sandwich better than anyone can.
It should smell fresh like a daisy
so I make it mayonnaisey
and the mayonnaise that I use is Mrs. Schlorer's.

I'm a sandwich man,
I'm a sandwich man,
I can make a sandwich better than anyone can.
I want to be a sandwich man for the rest of my days
as long as I can use Mrs. Schlorer's Mayonnaise."

== List of products ==
The following is a list of some of the products made under the Mrs. Schlorer's brand name over the last 100 years:

- Mayonnaise
- Olivenaise
- Pic-O-Naise
- Tip Top Relish
- India Relish
- Sweet Chow Chow
- Sweet Cucumber Relish
- Sweet Cucumber Rings
- Sweet Gherkins
- Sweet Mixed Pickles
- Sweet Preserved Pickle Strips
- Sweet Pickles
- Sour Chow Chow
- Sour Onions
- Sour Pickles
- Mild Barbecue Sauce
- Mince Meat
- Baked Ham Glaze
- Turkey Golden Table Syrup
- Supreme Baking Molasses

== See also ==
- List of mayonnaises
