= Ah-So =

American sauce and marinade brand

Ah-So is a line of Chinese and East Asian American sauces and marinades from Allied Old English, Inc., Port Reading, New Jersey. This garlicky, sweet, sticky, brightly red marinade is popular in the Northeast United States. A plastic squeeze bottle version exists. This sauce falls into the American Chinese cuisine genre of Chinese cooking and aims to replicate the sweet, smoky flavor of boneless spareribs found on the menus of most Chinese take-out restaurants. The sauce contains corn syrup, fermented soy beans and garlic.

The expression "ah so" comes from the Japanese ă sō desu ka? ("oh, is that so?"), which is sometimes shortened to "ah so". Although sometimes used as mock-Chinese, the phrase is Japanese in origin.

== See also ==
- List of brand name condiments
