= Mizkan =

Japanese food manufacturer

Mizkan Holdings Co., Ltd.

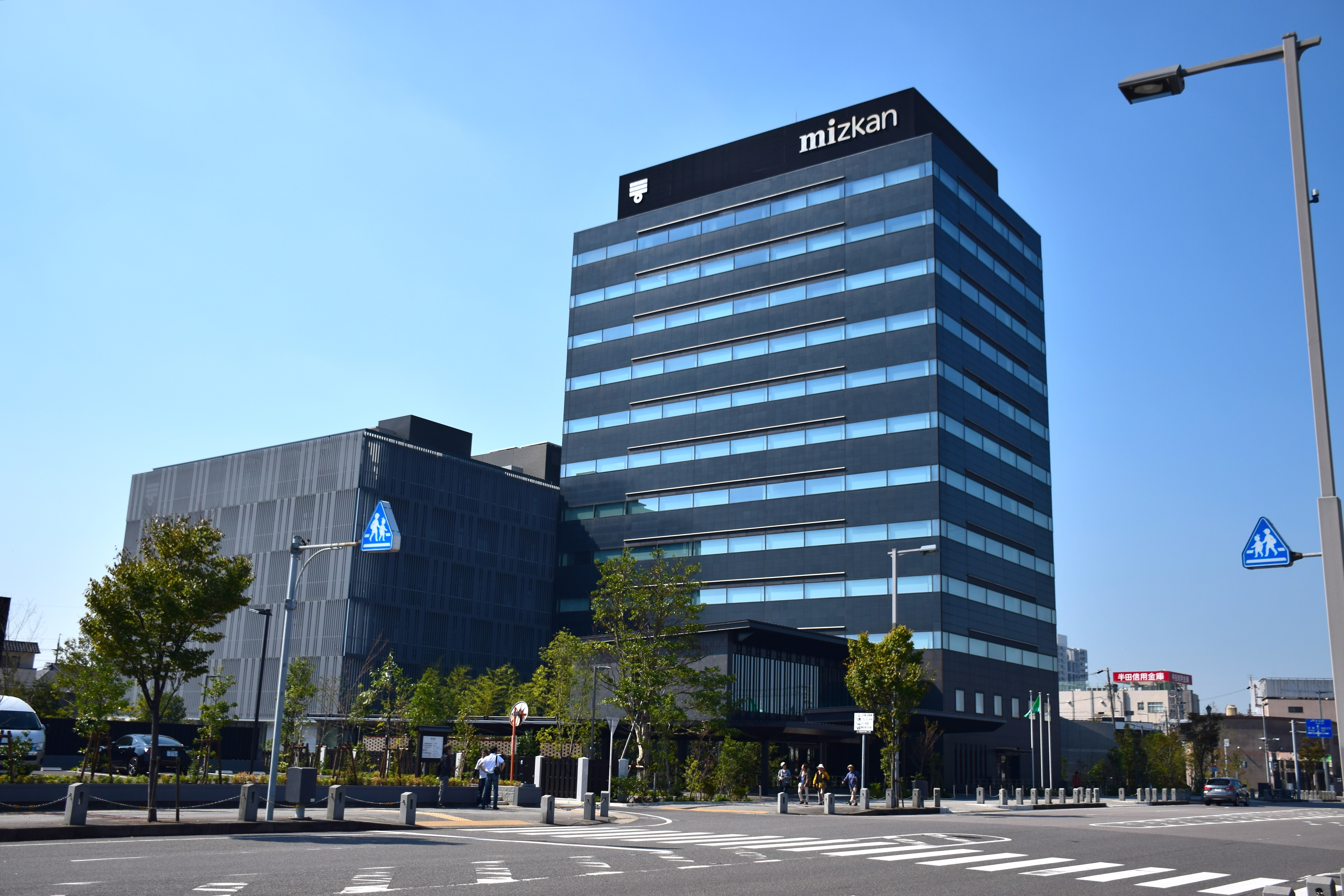
- Native name: 株式会社 Mizkan Holdings
- Company type: Private KK
- Industry: Food
- Founded: 1804; 222 years ago
- Founder: Matazaemon Nakano
- Headquarters: Handa, Aichi Prefecture 475-8585, Japan
- Area served: Worldwide
- Key people: Miwa Nakano (Chairman and CEO); Yuko Nakano (President)
- Products: Vinegars; Sauces; Condiments; Soup bases
- Revenue: JPY 270 billion (FY 2022)
- Number of employees: 3,700
- Website: Official website

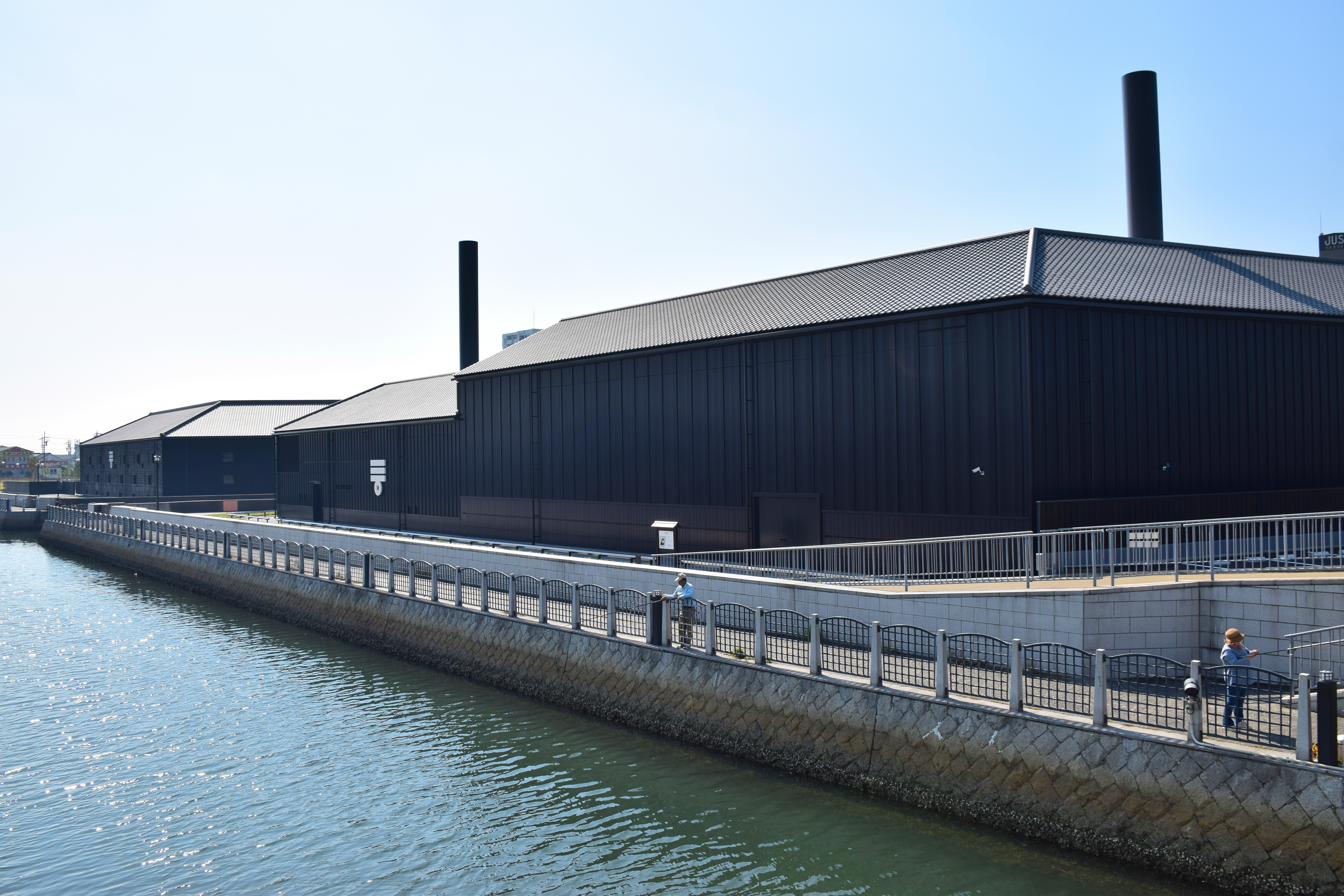
Mizkan Museum

Mizkan Holdings (Mitsukan Hōrudingusu) is a Japanese company that produces vinegars (including seasoned rice vinegars, balsamic vinegars, and wine vinegars), mustards, salad dressings, authentic East Asian sauces, nattō, and other food products. It is based in Handa, Aichi Prefecture, near Nagoya.

== History ==
The company was founded in Handa in 1804 by Matazaemon Nakano, who began producing rice vinegar using byproducts from the production of sake (rice alcohol). Nakano named his company the Mitsukan Group. In the late 1970s Mitsukan expanded from Japan into the United States and began acquiring regional condiment companies. The group was officially registered as a corporate entity in July 1977. In 1995, in honour of its founder, the U.S. arm of the business changed its name to Nakano Foods. In 2004, the Mitsukan Group became The Mizkan Group Corporation, and Nakano Foods became Mizkan America.

== Present ==
Mizkan's product range includes: vinegars, seasoned rice vinegars, balsamic vinegars, wine vinegars, mustards, jellies, salad dressings, and authentic Asian sauces. The company's CEO is Miwa Nakano, and its president is Yuko Nakano.

In July 2012 the British company Premier Foods sold its Sarson's vinegar, Haywards pickled onion and Dufrais vinegar brands to Mizkan for £41m as part of a streamlining programme. Also in late 2012 the Branston pickle brand was sold to Mizkan.

In May 2014, it bought the US Ragú and Bertolli pasta and sauce brands from the British multinational Unilever for $2.15 billion.
