= Haywards (pickles) =

United Kingdom pickle brand

Haywards is a brand of pickles sold in the United Kingdom. The brand is owned by Mizkan of Japan, and the pickles are produced in Mills Hill, Manchester and Bury St Edmunds.

== History ==
The brand dates from 1868.

== Varieties ==
- Haywards Mixed Pickles (cauliflower, gherkins, onions, red pepper)
- Haywards Piccalilli
- Haywards Traditional Gherkins in Vinegar
- Haywards Pickled Beetroot
- Haywards Strong Pickled Onions
- Haywards Pickled Red Cabbage
- Haywards Silverskin Onions
- Haywards Sweet Onions

== See also ==
- List of brand name condiments
