= Joppie sauce =

Type of sauce from the Netherlands

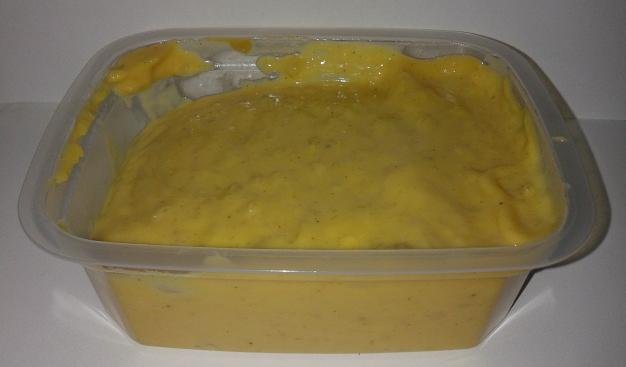
Joppiesaus in a plastic container

Joppie sauce, also known as Joppe sauce or (Dutch) Joppiesaus, is a condiment from the Netherlands based on mayonnaise with mild curry spices. It is commonly offered in fast food restaurants in the Netherlands and Belgium, but is also available in grocery stores.

== Origin ==
Joppie sauce was created by Janyne "Joppie" de Jager of Annie's Snackbar in Glanerbrug, a village in the Netherlands on the border with Germany. It consists of mayonnaise with a 'secret blend' of spices. In 2002, the sauce entered industrial production by Elite Salades & Snacks, a company in Neede, who legally own the sauce's Dutch name Joppiesaus.

== Ingredients and flavour ==
Joppie sauce is a vegetable-oil-based mayonnaise with onion and curry powder spices. The flavour is akin to that of a mild curry mayonnaise and the colour is a vivid turmeric yellow. The sauce is commonly served with French fries and other deep-fried or fast food dishes.

== See also ==
- Belgian sauces
- List of sauces
