= List of hot sauces =

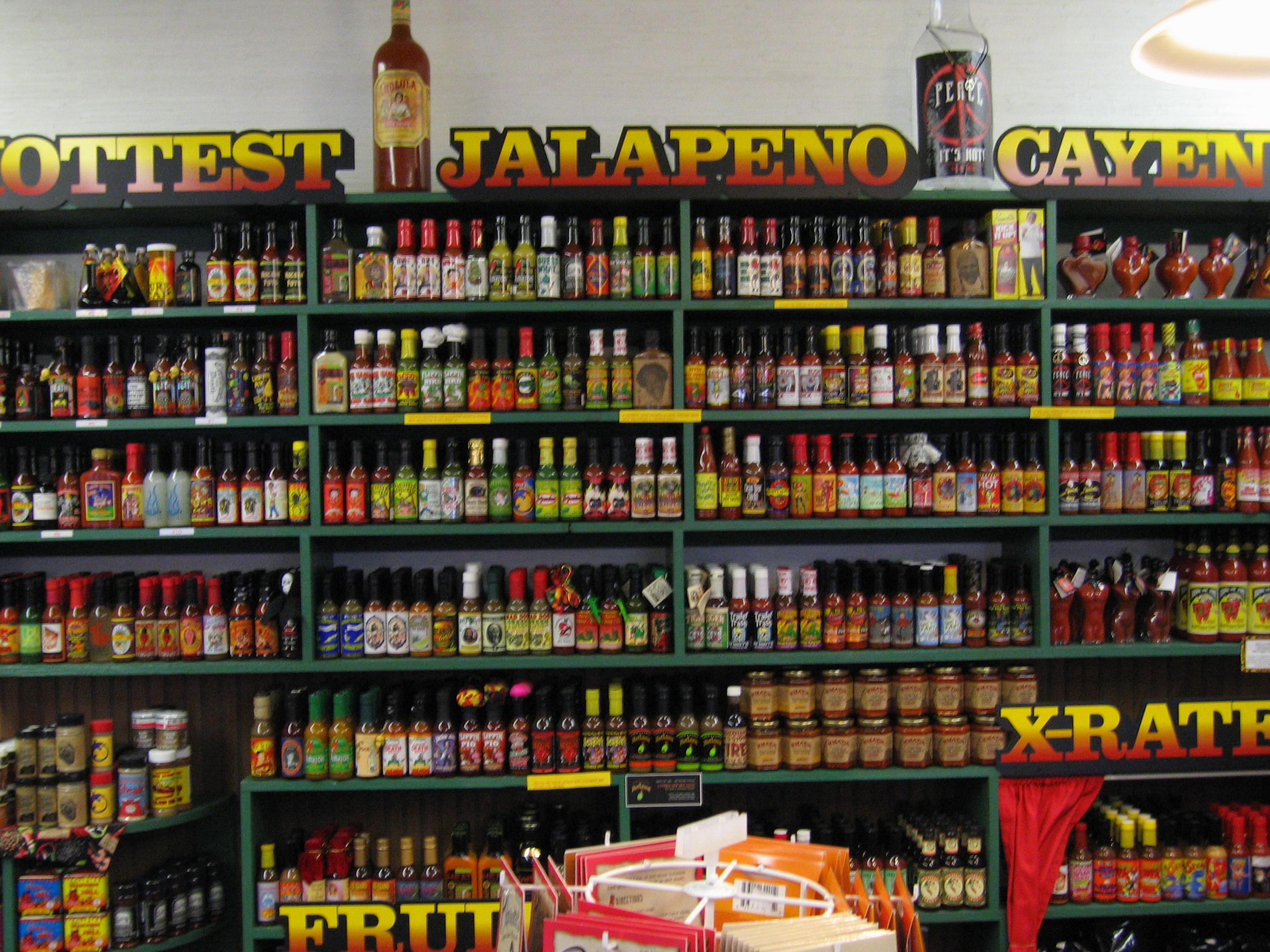
Hot sauces

This is a list of commercial hot sauces. Variations on a company's base product are not necessarily common, and are not always included.

Scoville heat ratings vary depending on batch. However, many companies do not disclose numeric ratings for their products at all. "Extra hot" versions may be advertised as several times hotter than the original, without specifying the heat of the original.

- Some companies do not disclose which peppers are used.
- Labels reading "pepper" and "aged pepper" may refer to a similar aged mash.

== Hot sauces ==
Hot sauce name	Ingredients sorted by amount used	Scoville heat rating	Origin	Other information
Blair's Death Sauce	Vinegar, cayenne, garlic, chipotle, lime juice, cilantro, herbs and spices		Middletown Township, Monmouth County, New Jersey, US	
Búfalo Jalapeño Mexican Hot Sauce	Water, carrots, vinegar, chile peppers, sugar, salt, carob bean gum, sodium benzoate, spices, FD&C Red 40 (product label, 2009)		Lomas de Chapultepec, Miguel Hidalgo, Mexico City, Mexico	115 mg of sodium per 5 g serving (5% DV)
Cholula Hot Sauce	Water, peppers (árbol and piquin), salt, vinegar, spices and xanthan gum (product label, 2010)	500–1,000	Chapala, Jalisco, Mexico	85 mg of sodium per 5 g serving (3% DV)
Crystal Hot Sauce	Aged red cayenne pepper, vinegar, salt (product label, 2009)	4,000	Mid-City New Orleans, New Orleans, Louisiana, US	135 mg of sodium per 5 g serving (6% DV), kosher
Crystal Hot Sauce Extra Hot	Aged red cayenne pepper, vinegar, water, salt, natural flavorings, xanthan gum (product label, 2009)		Mid-City New Orleans, New Orleans, Louisiana, US	120 mg of sodium per 5 g serving (5% DV), kosher
Da'Bomb	Habanero peppers, pepper extract, apricot nectar (water, apricot pulp and juice, corn syrup, sugar, citric acid, ascorbic acid), mustard flour, garlic, allspice and spices (product label, The Final Answer, 2011)	Products range from 119,000 to 1.5 million	United States	For use as a food additive only
Dave's Gourmet "Insanity Sauce" (original)	Hot peppers, tomato paste, hot pepper extract, salt, onions, cane vinegar, garlic, citric acid, xanthan gum, spices (product label, 2010)	180,000	Costa Rica	10 mg of sodium per 5 g serving (0% DV)
El Pato	Dried pepper, vinegar, spices salt, xanthan gum, 0.1% sodium benzoate, may contain food coloring (product label, 2010)		Mexico	11 mg of sodium per 5 g serving (0% DV), 8% MDR vitamin C, glass bottle
El Yucateco Hot Sauce			Mérida, Mérida Municipality, Yucatán, Mexico	
Endorphin Rush Beyond Hot Sauce	Tomato paste, water, pepper extract, vinegar, sugar, molasses, soy sauce, sulfites	33,390	United States	20 mg of sodium per 5 g serving (1% DV)
Frank's RedHot Original	Aged cayenne peppers, vinegar, water, salt, garlic powder (product label, 2009)	499	Cincinnati, Hamilton County, Ohio, US	200 mg of sodium per 5 g serving (8% DV), kosher
Frank's RedHot Xtra Hot Sauce	Aged cayenne red peppers, distilled vinegar, water, salt, natural flavor, garlic powder	2,085	Cincinnati, Hamilton County, Ohio, US	190 mg of sodium per 5 g serving (8% DV), kosher
Huy Fong's sriracha sauce	Chili peppers, sugar, garlic, vinegar, salt, xanthan gum. Sometimes potassium sorbate, sodium bisulfate (product label, 2009)	2,200	Los Angeles, Los Angeles County, California, US	No artificial colorings or flavorings, plastic bottle
Indian Spice Sauce	Vinegar, Garlic, Cumin, Coriander, Kashmiri Chili, Fenugreek, Salt, Cardamom	500-2500	San Diego, CA (San Diego Pepper Company)	40 mg of sodium per 5 g serving
Indofood Sambal	Habanero peppers, Bird's eye peppers, spices		South Jakarta, Jakarta, Indonesia	
Louisiana Hot Sauce Original (Note: note that other companies now use the word "Louisiana")	Cayenne pepper (base), vinegar, salt	450	New Iberia, Iberia Parish, Louisiana, US	240 mg of sodium per 5 g (10% DV)
Mad dog 357	Distilled vinegar, 3 million Scoville chile extract, evaporated cane juice, fresh Habanero peppers, garlic, onion, 160,000 Scoville cayenne pepper, spices, and xanthan gum	357,000	Sudbury, Middlesex County, Massachusetts, US	
Maga (Salsa Maga)	Water, chili peppers, vinegar, salt, spices, 0.1% sodium benzoate (product label, 2009)		Mexico	Gluten free, no artificial colorings or flavorings, plastic bottle
Marie Sharp's Habanero Pepper Sauce	Hand harvested, hand chopped, farm-to-bottle organic vegetables: Crisp carrot, juicy red Habanero peppers, sweet yellow onions, whole garlic cloves, key lime juice, natural vinegar, salt. Sauces vary in pepper content. *Substitute Grapefruit, Orange and Prickly pear for carrot	65,000 - 250,000	Dangriga, Stann Creek District, Belize	
Maria Avvacato's Apocalypse Scorpion Hot Sauce	Parsnip base, jalapeño peppers, onion, apocalypse scorpion peppers, garlic, vinegar, lemon juice, salt.		Mississippi, USA	
Mezzetta California Habanero Hot Sauce Twist & Shout	Water, California chili peppers, habanero peppers, tomato paste, distilled vinegar, sea salt, garlic, onion, spices, xanthan gum (product label, 2017)		San Francisco, California, US	80 mg of sodium per 5 g serving (3% DV); no added sugar; 7.5 fl oz glass bottle; refrigerate after opening; mezzetta.com
Nali Sauce			Limbe, Blantyre District, Southern Region, Malawi	
Nerpy's Gold Hot Sauce	Scotch bonnet peppers, mango, vinegar, salt		Richmond Hill, Ontario, Canada	Gluten-free, vegan; Ontario Made certified; 9/10 taste rating; founded 2008; available at Metro, Sobeys, and Farm Boy
Nerpy's Red Hot Pepper Sauce	West Indies Red Hot peppers, pomegranate, beets, Appleton rum, paprika		Richmond Hill, Ontario, Canada	Gluten-free, vegan; Ontario Made certified; featured in Toronto Life; founded 2008; available at Metro, Sobeys, and Farm Boy
Pickapeppa Sauce			Manchester Parish, Jamaica	
San Diego Sauce	Vinegar, Chipotle, Garlic, Salt, Black Pepper	500-2500	San Diego, CA (San Diego Pepper Company)	40 mg of sodium per 5 g serving
Scorpion Bay Hot Sauce			California, US	
Small Axe Peppers			The Bronx, New York City, New York, US	
Tabasco (Sweet and Spicy)		100–600	Avery Island, Iberia Parish, Louisiana, US	Glass bottle
Tabasco (Green Sauce)	Vinegar, jalapeño, salt	600–1,200	Avery Island, Iberia Parish, Louisiana, US	Shelf life 18 months, unopened, glass bottle
Tabasco (Garlic Pepper Sauce)	Vinegar, cayenne, tabasco, red jalapeño, garlic, salt	1,200–2,400	Avery Island, Iberia Parish, Louisiana, US	Shelf life two years, unopened, glass bottle
Tabasco (Chipotle Sauce)	Vinegar, slow-smoked red jalapeño, salt	1,500–2,500	Avery Island, Iberia Parish, Louisiana, US	Shelf life 18 months, unopened, glass bottle
Tabasco (Original)	Vinegar, tabasco pepper, salt	2,500–5,000	Avery Island, Iberia Parish, Louisiana, US	Shelf life five years, unopened, kosher, glass bottle
Tabasco (Habanero)	Distilled vinegar, habanero pepper, cane sugar, TABASCO brand pepper sauce (distilled vinegar, red pepper, salt), salt, mango purée, dehydrated onion, banana purée, tomato paste, tamarind purée, papaya purée, spices, garlic, TABASCO pepper mash (aged red pepper, salt)	>7,000	Avery Island, Iberia Parish, Louisiana, US	Shelf life five years, unopened
Tabasco (Scorpion)	Distilled vinegar, Trinidad scorpion pepper, cane sugar, TABASCO brand pepper sauce (distilled vinegar, red pepper, salt), salt, guava purée, pineapple, guava powder, pineapple powder	35,000	Avery Island, Iberia Parish, Louisiana, US	
Taco Bell Diablo	Water, tomato paste, distilled vinegar, modified tapioca starch, salt, spices, sugar, <1% sodium acid sulfate, maltodextrin dehydrated garlic, onion powder, natural flavors, potassium sorbate and sodium benzoate (preservatives), xanthan gum, disodium inosinate, disodium guanylate, extractives of paprika (product label, 2020)		Downey, Los Angeles County, California, US	Sauce packet (in restaurant) or glass bottle (sold in retail stores)
Taco Bell Hot	Water, tomato paste, jalapeño peppers, vinegar, salt, spices dehydrated onion, xanthan gum, sodium benzoate, soy (product label, 2009)		Downey, Los Angeles County, California, US	Sauce packet (in restaurant) or glass bottle (sold in retail stores)
Taco Bell Mild	Water, tomato puree, vinegar, <2% salt, chili peppers, spices, xanthan gum, sodium benzoate, soy lecithin, natural flavor (product label, 2009)		Downey, Los Angeles County, California, US	Sauce packet (in restaurant) or glass bottle (sold in retail stores)
Taco Bell Fire!	Water, tomato paste, jalapeño, vinegar, salt, chili pepper, dehydrated onion, sugar, modified food starch, onion juice, spices, chili seeds, brewers yeast extract, natural capsicum and tomato flavors, dextrose, potassium sorbate, sodium benzoate, xanthan gum, garlic powder, autolyzed yeast extract, lactic acid, soy sauce (water, wheat, soybeans, salt) (product label, 2009)	500	Downey, Los Angeles County, California, US	Sauce packet (in restaurant) or glass bottle (sold in retail stores)
Tamazula (Salsa Tamazula)	Water, chili peppers, vinegar, salt, spices, sodium benzoate (product label 2009)	4,000	Guadalajara, Jalisco, Mexico	110 mg of sodium per 5 g serving (4% DV), Vitamin A (7% DV)
Tapatío	Water, red peppers, salt, spices, garlic, acetic acid, xanthan gum, sodium benzoate (product label 2009)	3,000	Maywood, Los Angeles County, California, US	Contains no sugar, gluten, or MSG, no refrigeration needed, best within two years of purchase> 110 mg of sodium per 5 g serving (5% DV)
Texas Pete	Peppers, vinegar, salt, xanthan gum (product label, 2009)	747	Winston-Salem, Forsyth County, North Carolina, US	
Toad Sweat Kickin' Key Lime Dessert Hot Sauces	Key Lime Juice, Sugar, Agave Syrup, Vanilla, Habanero Puree, Spices (product label 2024)		Lancaster, Lancashire	Vegan, Gluten-Free, Allergen-Free (UK 14 allergens)
Toad Sweat Zippin' Lemon Dessert Hot Sauces	Lemon juice, Sugar, Agave Syrup, Vanilla, Habanero Puree, Spices (product label 2024)		Lancaster, Lancashire	Vegan, Gluten-Free, Allergen-Free (UK 14 allergens).
Toad Sweat Tinglin' Orange Dessert Hot Sauces	Orange Juice, Sugar, Agave Syrup, Vanilla, Habanero Puree, Spices (product label 2024)		Lancaster, Lancashire	Vegan, Gluten-Free, Allergen-Free (UK 14 allergens)
Toad Sweat Zingin' Cranberry Dessert Hot Sauces	Cranberry Juice, Sugar, Agave Syrup, Vanilla, Habanero Puree, Spices (product label 2024)		Lancaster, Lancashire	Vegan, Gluten-Free, Allergen-Free (UK 14 allergens)
Toad Sweat Punchin' Pineapple Dessert Hot Sauces	Pineapple Juice, Sugar, Agave Syrup, Vanilla, Habanero Puree, Spices (product label 2024)		Lancaster, Lancashire	Vegan, Gluten-Free, Allergen-Free (UK 14 allergens)
Trappey's Red Devil Cayenne Pepper Sauce	Vinegar, red cayenne pepper, salt, guar gum, xanthan gum, ascorbic acid (product label, 2009)		New Iberia, Iberia Parish, Louisiana, US	150 mg of sodium per 5 g serving (6% DV), kosher, glass bottle
Trappey's Bull brand Louisiana Hot Sauce	Red jalapeño peppers	1,200 - 1,600	New Iberia, Iberia Parish, Louisiana, US	Glass bottle
Trappey's Louisiana Hot Sauce	Red jalapeño peppers	1,200 to 1,600	New Iberia, Iberia Parish, Louisiana, US	Glass bottle
Trappey's INDI-PEP Pepper Sauce	Red jalapeño, red cayenne and red tabasco peppers with a variety of spices, onion and garlic	2,000 - 2,400	New Iberia, Iberia Parish, Louisiana, US	Glass bottle
Trappey's MEXI-PEP Louisiana Hot Sauce	Red cayenne, red jalapeño and red tabasco peppers	1,400 - 1,800	New Iberia, Iberia Parish, Louisiana, US	Glass bottle
Trappey's Chef Magic Jalapeño Sauce	Green jalapeño peppers	1,800 - 2,200	New Iberia, Iberia Parish, Louisiana, US	Glass bottle
Trappey's Pepper Sauce	Red tabasco, red jalapeño and red cayenne peppers	2,000 - 2,400	New Iberia, Iberia Parish, Louisiana, US	Glass bottle
Valentina (Salsa Valentina)	Water, chili peppers, vinegar, salt, spices, 0.1% sodium benzoate (product label, 2010)	900	Guadalajara, Jalisco, Mexico	64 mg of sodium per 5 g serving (3% DV);Manufactured by the Salsa Tamazula, company of Guadalajara, Northwestern Mexico; glass bottle

== See also ==
- Chili sauce
- List of condiments
- List of sauces
