= Louisiana Hot Sauce =

Brand of hot sauce

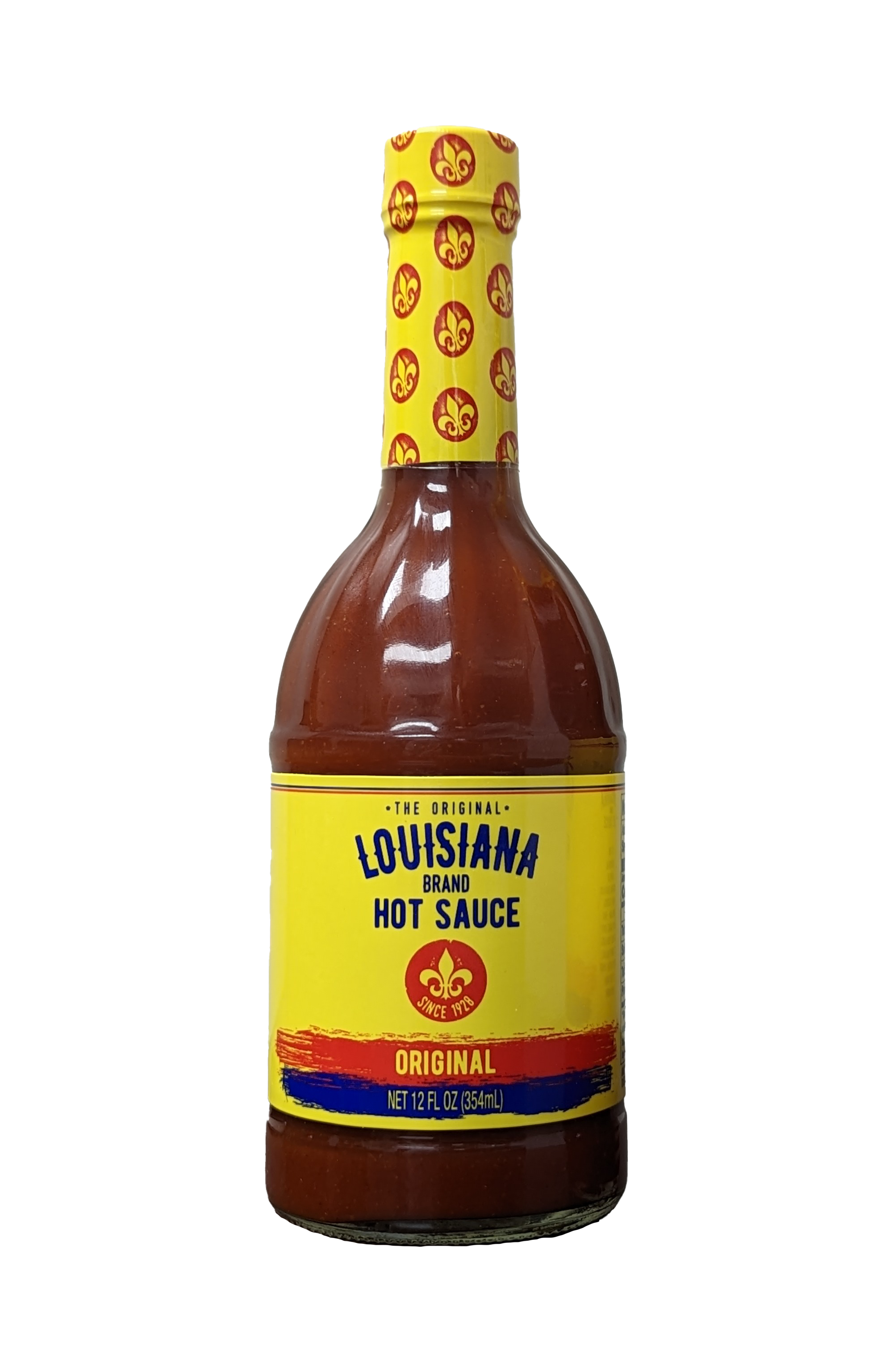
A bottle of The Original Louisiana Brand Hot Sauce

The Original Louisiana Brand Hot Sauce is a brand of hot sauce manufactured in New Iberia, Louisiana, by Summit Hill Foods. Bruce Foods was the previous owner and manufacturer of the brand and sold it to Summit Hill Foods (formerly Southeastern Mills, Inc.) in April 2015.

== Manufacture ==
The Original Louisiana Brand Hot Sauce is prepared using aged long cayenne peppers, which undergo the aging process for a minimum of one year. The product is among hot sauces manufactured in the "Louisiana style," whereby cooked and ground chili peppers are combined with vinegar and salt, and then left to ferment during the aging process. In 2001, over 200,000 bottles of hot sauce were manufactured daily in various sizes.

== History ==
Bruce Foods first marketed The Original Louisiana Brand Hot Sauce in 1928, and manufactured the product through April 2015. It started off as a family company, in which the sauce was prepared in the kitchen of a home and sold to neighbors. The Original Louisiana Brand Hot Sauce was the first sauce brand marketed using the state of Louisiana's name. (Note: "Some of the most authentic products are those made by Bruce Foods of New Iberia, Louisiana and sold under the "Original" Louisiana Brand. "Original" Louisiana hot sauce, the first sauce sold under the state's name, is with good reason ...") The brand's slogan was "not too hot, not too mild."

In April 2015, Bruce Foods sold The Original Louisiana Brand Hot Sauce brand and its assets to Summit Hill Foods, which is headquartered in Rome, Georgia. The hot sauce continues to be made at the manufacturing plant in New Iberia, Louisiana.

In 2023, The Original Louisiana Brand Hot Sauce updated their logo and released new flavors (including Garlic Lovers, Tangy Taco, Cajun Heat, Southwest Jalapeño, and Smoked Chipotle) in 6oz bottles, adding to the Original, Sweet Heat with Honey, and Hotter (made with Habanero Peppers) flavors. The Original Louisiana Brand Hot Sauce also sells jalapeño peppers in three forms: whole, sliced and diced; as well as Tabasco Peppers in Vinegar, and their own Wing Sauce.

== Distribution ==
The Original Louisiana Brand Hot Sauce is available at many grocery stores and restaurants in the United States, and was exported to over 100 countries as of 2001.

== Uses ==
The Original Louisiana Brand Hot Sauce is used as a condiment to add flavor to foods, as an ingredient in some dishes, and also as a marinade for some foods, such as chicken wings.

== See also ==
- Frank's RedHot sauce, also from New Iberia
- Trappey's Hot Sauce, also from New Iberia
- List of condiments
- List of hot sauces
- Louisiana Creole cuisine
- Scoville heat scale
