= Frank's RedHot =

Hot sauce made from cayenne peppers

- Product type: Hot sauce
- Current owner: McCormick & Company
- Country: United States
- Introduced: 1920; 106 years ago
- Previous owners: Reckitt Benckiser
- Website: FranksRedHot.com
- Heat: Low
- Scoville scale: 450 SHU

Frank's RedHot is a hot sauce made from a variety of cayenne peppers, produced by McCormick & Company. The Original blend ranks low on the Scoville scale, with 450 SHUs, while the XTRA Hot variety measures 2,000 SHUs, which is lower than Tabasco, Cholula Hot Sauce, and Tapatío, and only slightly hotter than Sriracha.

== History ==
The Frank Tea and Spice Company was founded in 1896 in Cincinnati, Ohio. In 1917, owner Jacob Frank contracted for the Estilette Pepper Farm in Louisiana where Adam Estilette and Frank became business partners. They mixed spices, vinegar, garlic and cayenne peppers and aged them, creating the original blend of Frank's RedHot, which entered the market in 1920. Frank's RedHot is the primary ingredient in many Buffalo wing recipes, but was probably not the hot sauce that was used in the original 1964 Anchor Bar recipe.

In 1977, Frank's RedHot was sold to Durkee Famous Foods. Following the purchase of the Durkee brand in 1995, it was owned by Reckitt Benckiser until 2017. Frank's is produced in Springfield, Missouri. In 2007, Thanasi Foods began marketing licensed Frank's RedHot flavored beef jerky and meat snacks. In August 2017, spice maker McCormick & Company closed a $4.2 billion deal that included French's mustard and Frank's RedHot sauce.

== Advertisements ==
Frank's RedHot is known for its national television ad campaign depicting an irreverent elderly woman named Ethel explaining her recipes for various foods. Usually in front of a prestigious figure (e.g., the Queen), she will quip "I put that s*** on everything", much to the disdain of those around her. The expletive is always censored with a bleep, and Ethel's mouth is covered with a censoring "splat".

== See also ==
- List of condiments
- List of hot sauces
- Louisiana Creole cuisine
- Scoville heat scale
