= Ashley Food Company =

American hot sauce manufacturer

Ashley Food Company is a hot sauce manufacturer, based in Sudbury, Massachusetts. The Ashley Food Company product line, called Mad Dog Hot Sauces, contains 28 hot sauces, oils and chili powders and barbecue sauce. In the spring of 2012 Ashley Food Company wanted to be in control of the quality and quantity of the scorpion peppers and any others they use in their products, so they started growing them in Massachusetts with the help of local greenhouses and an agricultural school.

In 2002 it manufactured Joe Perry’s Rock Your World Boneyard Brew Hot Sauce. In 2002 the company's Mad Cat Hot Sauce received the 1st Place Scovie award in the Habanero Hot Sauce category.

== See also ==
- Condiment
- Scoville heat scale
