= Buffalo wing =

American dish of spicy chicken wings

Buffalo wings
- Buffalo wings with blue cheese dressing
- Alternative names: Buffalo chicken wings Chicken wings Hot wings Wings
- Place of origin: United States
- Region or state: Buffalo, New York
- Created by: Disputed
- Serving temperature: Hot
- Main ingredients: Chicken wing Cayenne pepper hot sauce Butter
- Food energy (per serving): 90–110 kcal (380–460 kJ)

A Buffalo wing in American cuisine is an unbreaded chicken wing section (flat or drumette) that is generally deep-fried, then coated or dipped in a sauce consisting of a vinegar-based cayenne pepper hot sauce and melted butter. They are traditionally served hot with celery and carrot sticks and a dip of ranch dressing or blue cheese dressing.

Buffalo wings are named after Buffalo, New York, where they were invented, and have no relation to the animal. They are often called simply chicken wings, hot wings, or just wings.

Buffalo wings have gained in popularity in the United States and abroad, with some North American restaurant chains featuring them as a main menu item. The name "Buffalo" is now also applied to other spiced fried foods served with dipping sauces, including boneless chicken wings (made from chicken breast meat rather than a chicken wing), chicken fries, chicken nuggets, popcorn chicken, shrimp, and cauliflower. It is also used for other dishes, such as pizza, that are seasoned with the Buffalo-style sauce or a seasoning.

== History ==
=== Origin ===
There are several different claims about the invention of Buffalo wings. One is that Buffalo wings were first prepared in 1964 at the Anchor Bar in Buffalo, New York, by Teressa Bellissimo, who owned the bar with her husband Frank. At the time, chicken wings were inexpensive and undesirable, and normally thrown away or reserved for stock or soup.

Several versions of the story of the invention have been circulated by the Bellissimo family and others, including:

- The Bellissimos' son, Dominic, was tending the bar, and upon the unannounced late-night arrival of several of his friends, Teressa wanted a fast and easy snack to present to the guests. She came up with the idea of deep frying chicken wings and tossing them in cayenne hot sauce.
- Dominic told The New Yorker reporter Calvin Trillin in 1980: "It was Friday night in the bar and since people were buying a lot of drinks he wanted to do something nice for them at midnight when the mostly Catholic patrons would be able to eat meat again." He stated his mother came up with the idea of chicken wings.
- There was a mistaken delivery of wings instead of backs and necks for making the bar's spaghetti sauce. Faced with this unexpected resource, Frank says that he asked Teressa to do something with them, resulting in the Buffalo wing.

Although an article published about the Anchor Bar in a local newspaper during 1969 does not mention Buffalo wings, a local competitor of the Anchor Bar, Duff's, began selling Buffalo wings in that year.

Another claim is that John Young, who moved to Buffalo from Stockton, Alabama in 1948 at the age of 13, popularized chicken wings in Buffalo. Beginning in 1961, he began serving uncut chicken wings that were breaded, deep fried, and served in his own special tomato-based Mumbo sauce at his Buffalo restaurant. Prior to opening his restaurant, he had a conversation with a boxer who traveled; in a later interview Young recalled: "He told me that there was a restaurant in Washington, D.C. that was doing a good business with wings and I decided to specialize." In the same interview Young stated that the Anchor Bar did not offer Buffalo wings as a regular menu item until 1974. He registered the name of his restaurant, John Young's Wings 'n Things, at the county courthouse before leaving the Buffalo area in 1970. In 2013, at the National Buffalo Wing Festival held in Buffalo, John Young's contributions were acknowledged when he was inducted into the festival's National Buffalo Wing Hall of Flame.

=== Growth and popularity ===
In 1977, the city of Buffalo issued an official proclamation celebrating Anchor Bar co-owner Frank Bellissimo and declared July 29, 1977, to be Chicken Wing Day. Throughout the 1970s and 1980s, Buffalo wings gained in popularity as a bar food and appetizer across the United States, as well as in towns near the border in Canada. Large franchises specializing in Buffalo wings eventually emerged, notably Buffalo Wild Wings, founded in 1982, and Hooters in 1983. McDonald's began selling Mighty Wings as an option in 1990 at their restaurant locations in the United States. In 1994, following four Super Bowl appearances by the Buffalo Bills football team, the Domino's pizza chain added Buffalo wings to their national menu, followed by Pizza Hut the next year.

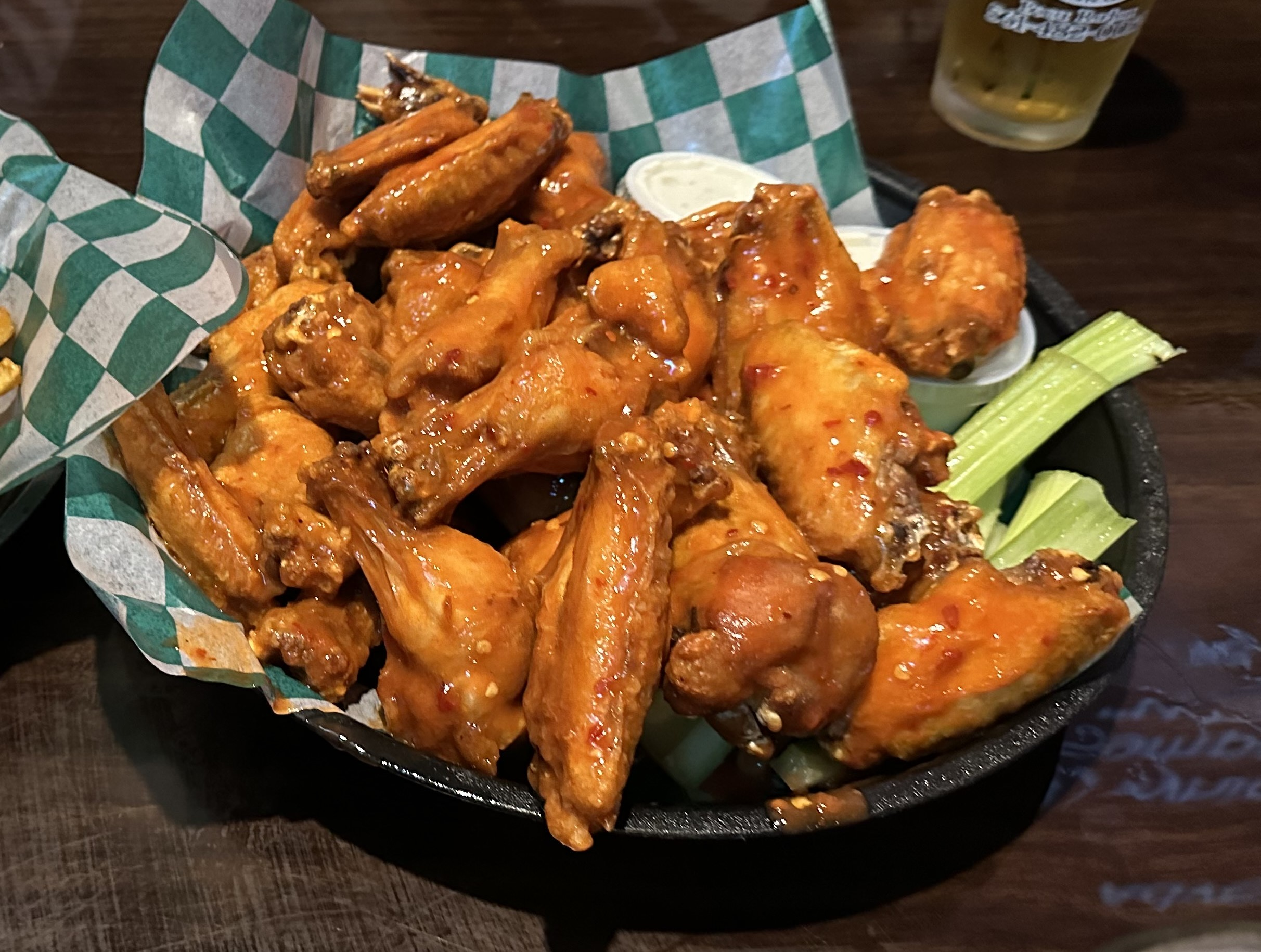
An order of buffalo wings from Packy's Sports Grill in Boca Raton, Florida

As the market for chicken wings expanded, restaurants began to create and use a variety of sauces in addition to buffalo sauce. Some of these new chicken wing sauces were influenced by Chinese, Japanese, Thai, Caribbean, and Indian cuisines. Other flavors created by restaurants include unique combinations, such as Blueberry BBQ Wing Sauce and Maple/Bacon Glaze for example, to help keep customer interest and grow their businesses. After the price of raw wings increased, and with a growing desire by some diners for a neater eating experience, restaurants began to offer a menu item called "boneless wings," sometimes marketed under the name wyngz. Boneless wings are essentially small pieces of skinless, boneless chicken breast that are coated in flour and spices, then fried or baked, like a chicken nugget. They are usually coated in or served with the same sauces as Buffalo wings. The growing popularity in recent years of Buffalo wing consumption, and of restaurants serving wings, have led to actual and perceived shortages of chicken wings in the United States during certain times.

In many areas of the United States, chicken wing festivals are held—with Buffalo wings being used in competitive eating events such as at Philadelphia's Wing Bowl and the National Buffalo Wing Festival. It has also become commonplace for restaurants to offer a wing-eating contest. Many bars and restaurants intentionally create an extra-hot sauce for this purpose, and customers are sometimes rewarded with their picture posted on the restaurant's wall or website, a commemorative T-shirt, a free meal or a combination of rewards for successfully completing the challenge.

== Preparation ==
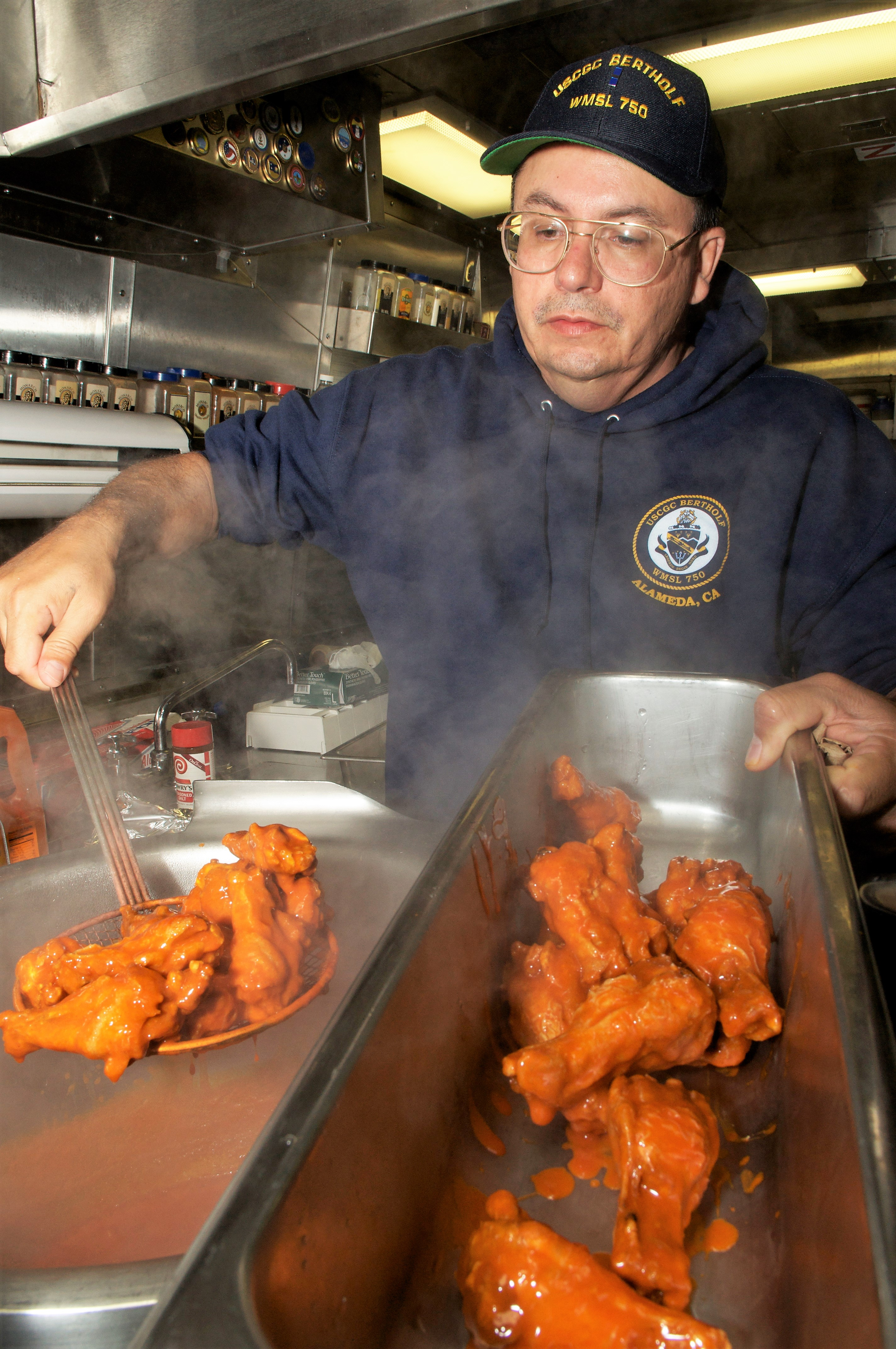
A United States Coast Guard cook preparing Buffalo wings in the galley of USCGC Bertholf (2009)

=== Chicken ===
The chicken wings used for Buffalo wings are usually segmented into three parts: drumette, flat, and flapper or pointer, the last of which is usually discarded, although some restaurants serve them with this latter part still connected to the flat. Traditionally, the wings are deep-fried in oil, without breading or flour until they are well browned. Alternatively, they may be baked, grilled, or broiled.

=== Sauce ===
Cayenne pepper–based hot sauce (classically Frank's RedHot, but similar sauces like Crystal may be used), melted butter, and vinegar are the standard base of Buffalo wing sauce, which may be made mild, medium, or hot. Other common ingredients include as Worcestershire sauce and garlic powder. Commercial ready-to-use wing sauce is made with varying levels of spiciness. The cooked chicken wings are placed in a bowl or pot and shaken to coat the wings completely covering them in sauce before serving.

=== Service ===
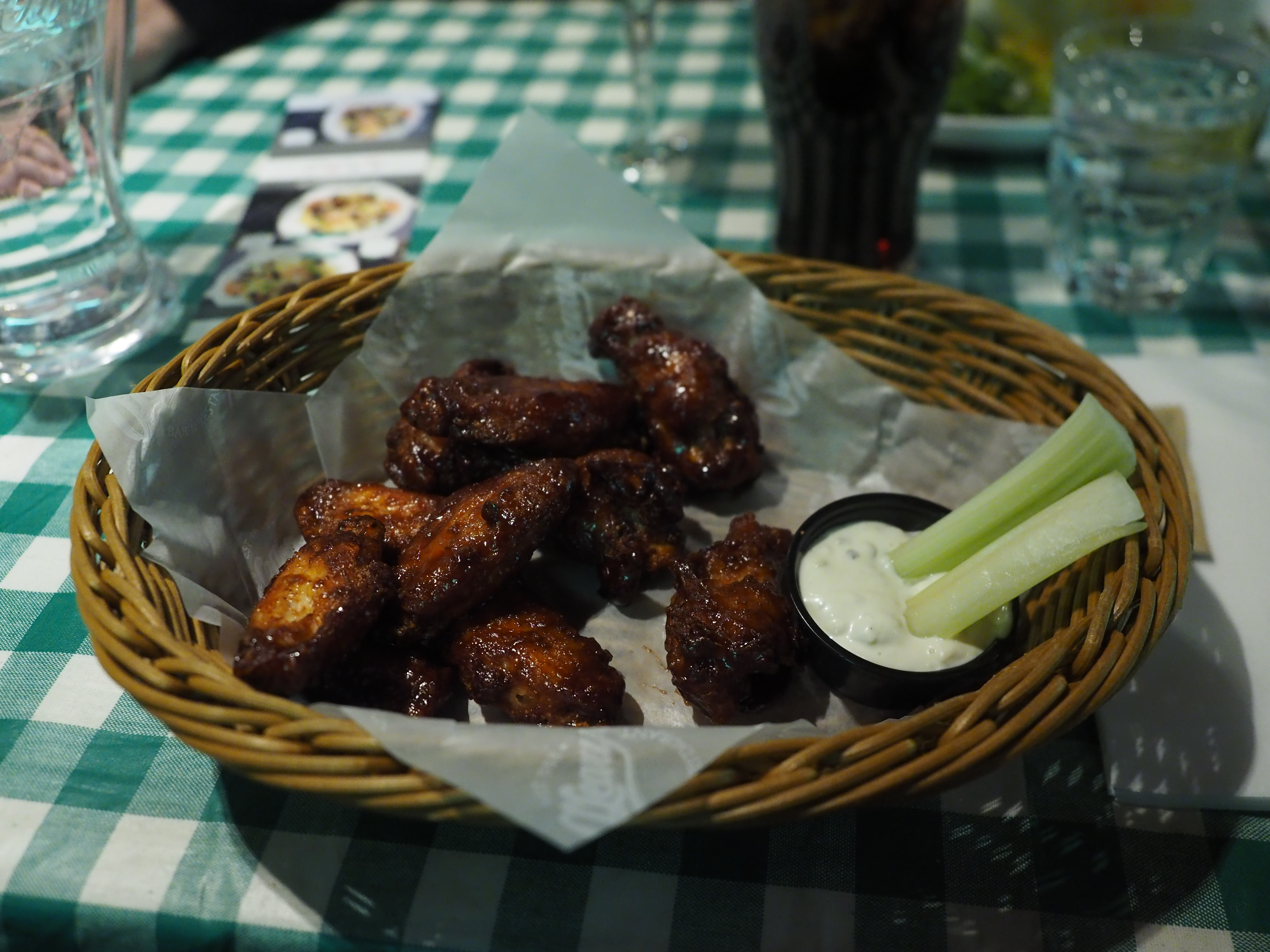
Buffalo wings with garlic dip and celery

Traditionally, Buffalo wings are served with small sticks of celery (accompanied sometimes with baby carrots or carrot sticks), and blue cheese dipping sauce on the side. Ranch dressing, however, is the most popular wing dipping sauce in the United States.

== See also ==
- Chicken lollipop
- List of hors d'oeuvre
- List of regional dishes of the United States
- Nashville hot chicken
- Yangnyeom chicken
- Swiss wing
- Lemon pepper wings
- Buffalo-style pizza
- Italian-American cuisine
