= Trappey's Hot Sauce =

American brand of hot sauce

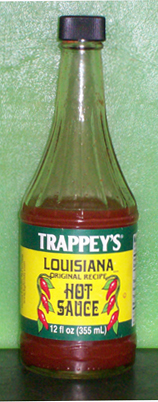
Trappey's Louisiana Hot Sauce (Original Recipe)

Trappey's Hot Sauce is an American brand of hot sauce that was originally produced by the New Iberia, Louisiana-based company Trappey's Fine Foods, Inc. Trappey's was purchased by B&G Foods in 1997. Trappey's makes Red Devil Cayenne Pepper Sauce, Bull Louisiana Hot Sauce, Indi-Pep Pepper Sauce, Chef Magic Jalapeño Sauce, Trappey's Cut Okra, Trappey's Creole Okra Gumbo, Trappey's Cocktail Okra (mild and hot varieties), and pickled jalapeños.

Trappey's is called Louisiana-style as it is no longer produced in Louisiana but imported from Colombia. With a Scoville rating of 1,200 to 1,600, Trappey's Louisiana Hot Sauce is noticeably milder than some other Louisiana-style sauces.

The company was founded in 1898, when Louisiana entrepreneur (and former McIlhenny Company employee) B.F. Trapé grew tabasco chilies from Avery Island seed.

B.F. Trapé founded the company B.F. Trappey and Sons and, with the help of his ten sons and one daughter, began producing his own sauce, which he called "Tabasco". The McIlhenny family, makers of Tabasco brand sauce, eventually responded to this challenge and a several-decades-long feud by receiving a trademark for their Tabasco brand in 1906. Afterwards, Trappey resorted to the less specific "Louisiana Hot Sauce". The company was sold to Perry and Wiltz Segura in 1982; after some interim owners, the McIlhenny Company acquired it in 1991, selling it to B&G Foods in 1997.

According to the nutritional information on the label, Trappey's contains distilled vinegar, red pepper, salt, guar gum, xanthan gum, ascorbic acid, and red #40. The sauce uses the xanthan gum to smooth consistency.

== See also ==
- Louisiana Hot Sauce: also from New Iberia
- Condiment
- List of hot sauces
- Scoville heat scale
