= Duff's Famous Wings =

American casual restaurant

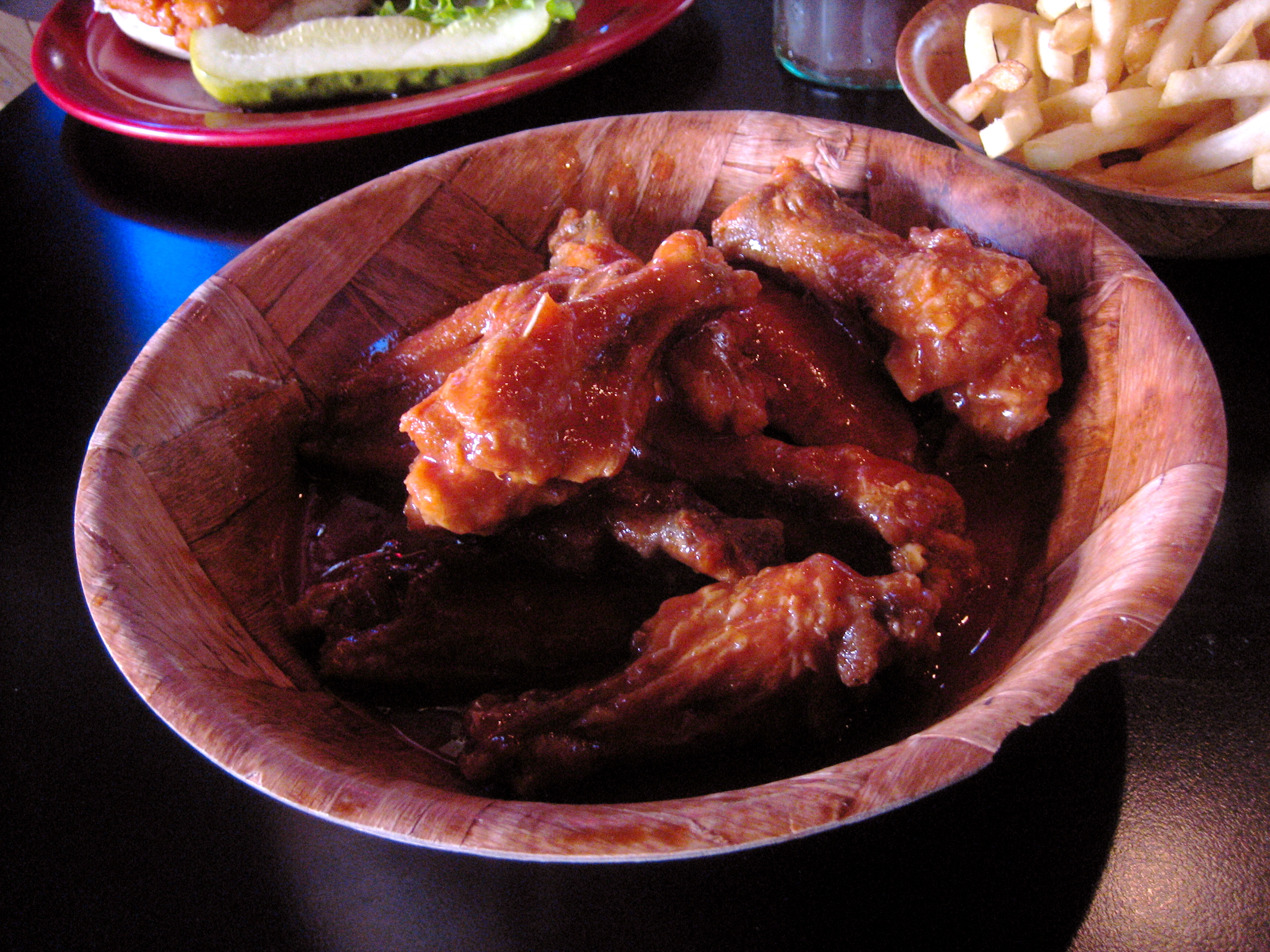
- Interactive map of Duff's Famous Wings

Restaurant information
- Established: 1946; 80 years ago
- Food type: American
- Dress code: Casual
- Location: 3651 Sheridan Drive, Amherst, New York, 14226
- Coordinates: 42°58′45″N 78°47′54″W
- Website: DuffsWings.com

Duff's Famous Wings is a restaurant based in the Amherst suburb of Buffalo, New York.

== History ==
The restaurant was established in 1946 under the name "Duff's", referencing its founder, Louise Duffney. In 1985, the restaurant was renamed "Duff's Famous Wings" after Buffalo wings became its major selling point. Duff's Famous Wings is known throughout Western New York as having good chicken wings and is noted for its rivalry with the Anchor Bar, the bar credited with inventing the Buffalo wing. In 2014, Duff's partnered with the Buffalo Bills to announce that a version of Duff's Famous Wings was added to Ralph Wilson Stadium.

Duff's was founded in 1946 and has grown to compete against the Anchor Bar with five Buffalo-area locations, a location in Rochester, a Dallas-area location in Southlake, Texas, and three locations in the Toronto area.

== See also ==
- Buffalo wing
- Anchor Bar
- List of chicken restaurants
