= D'Elidas =

Panamanian hot sauce brand

D’Elidas is the brand name for a hot sauce produced by Productos D’Elidas S.A in Panama. The D’Elidas original yellow hot sauce is made from the main ingredients "Aji Chombo" (Panamanian capsicum chinense), mustard and vinegar.

== History ==
The original yellow variety of D'Elidas hot sauce in an 11.5 Oz bottle

The recipe behind the D’Elidas original yellow hot sauce dates back to 1904 when it was created by a colony of antillean-Panamanians. For almost 100 years the recipe was inherited through generations until Elida Valdivieso came up with the idea of commercializing her version of the recipe.

In April 2002, the D’Elidas hot sauce product and brand were acquired by a group of Panamanian entrepreneurs. From that point, the company D’Elidas S.A. was formalized and the first exports from Panama to the United States started. Today, D'Elidas S.A. exports its products to the United States (New York, North Carolina, Florida, Missouri, Washington, and California), as well as to Canada, Costa Rica, El Salvador, India and most recently Sweden.

D’Elidas S.A. started its marketing with their yellow hot sauce "Picante Chombo" containing the main ingredients "Aji Chombo" (Panamanian habanero chili), mustard and vinegar.

== Marketing ==
D'Elidas hot sauce is featured in the musical video to the song "Rojo Caliente" (Red Hot), by Canadian reggaeton singer Meagan Taylor.

== Spiciness ==
The original yellow variety of D'Elidas hot sauce measures 2,500–5,000 SHU on the Scoville scale.

Most habanero varieties ripen from green to orange or red and have a Scoville scale heat rating of between 150,000 and 325,000.

== Varieties ==
The product portfolio of D'Elidas S.A. initially contained only the original Yellow hot sauce but has since expanded to also include both a Red hot sauce and a Green hot sauce, both containing habanero chili and vinegar but without the mustard found in the Yellow hot sauce. There is now also a Chinese style D'Elidas sweet and sour sauce, which is the only one of its kind that is based on the spicy Panamanian "Aji Chombo" (habanero chili).
