= Small Axe Peppers =

Hot sauce manufacturing company based in New York City

Small Axe Peppers is a New York City-based hot sauce manufacturing company that buys peppers grown in community gardens that participate in the program. The company was founded in 2014 by John A. Crotty, Chef King Phojanakong, and Daniel Fitzgerald.

== Description ==
In 2014, Small Axe Peppers was launched with a mission to support community gardens in urban areas. The company was founded in collaboration with non-profit organizations, GrowNYC, local community gardens, and Bronx Green-Up, the community outreach program of the New York Botanical Garden. Small Axe donates thousands of serrano pepper seedlings to more than 40 community gardens in the Bronx each year.

GrowNYC donates and distributes Small Axe's serrano pepper seedlings to participating community gardens and urban farms each spring. At the end of the season, Small Axe Peppers buys the fully grown peppers, which are the key to the hot sauce.

In 2014, Small Axe Peppers donated 3,500 serrano pepper seedlings to GrowNYC for distribution to gardens throughout the Bronx. The same year, Lehman College also grew a pepper patch in its garden for the firm. That year, 150 pounds of serrano peppers were sold, and Small Axe collected peppers from Bronx community gardens including Morning Glory Community Garden, Kelly Street Garden, Wishing Well Garden and Pelham Organics. During the first year of production, Small Axe Peppers LLC made 5,000 bottles of hot sauce.

The following year, Small Axe Peppers harvested 750 lbs of peppers from Bronx Community Gardens and made 30,000 bottles of Bronx Hot Sauce.

In 2016, the Bronx community gardens grew 1,500 pounds of serrano peppers, which resulted in 70,000 bottles of hot sauce, an increase from 5,000 bottles in 2014.

In 2018, Small Axe bought back 1,500 pounds of peppers from 30 gardens in the Bronx. The following year, the company donated 1,800 seedlings to the community gardens across the Bronx.

As of 2020, Small Axe Peppers bought peppers from community gardens from cities including, Chicago, Detroit, Baltimore, Oakland, Seattle and Los Angeles.

== Awards and recognition ==
In 2017, Small Axe Peppers won the Good Food Award for the Bronx Hot Sauce. The YouTube series Hot Ones by Sean Evans featured the Bronx Hot Sauce in season 5 and Chicago Hot Sauce in season 10. In season 5, Evans said for the Bronx Hot Sauce: “On a pound for pound level, I’m calling it right now, maybe the tastiest sauce we’ve ever had on this show.”
