= Lizano sauce =

Costa Rican condiment

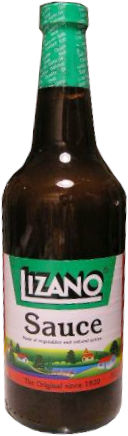
- Bottle of Salsa Lizano in export presentation, with English label.
- Product type: Condiment
- Current owner: Unilever
- Produced by: Unilever
- Country: Costa Rica
- Introduced: 1920
- Related brands: Worcestershire sauce, Pickapeppa Sauce
- Previous owners: 1920 - Lizano; 1991 - Best Foods
- Tagline: ¡A su comida le da vida! (Brings life to your food)
- Website: Lizano® Salsa de Vegetales y Condimentos Naturales

Lizano sauce (Spanish: salsa Lizano) is a Costa Rican condiment developed in 1920 by the Lizano company. It is now a product of Unilever. It is a thin, smooth, light brown sauce (akin to such condiments as HP Sauce or Worcestershire sauce).

It is meant to be used while cooking or at tableside to flavor one's food when serving. It is slightly sweet and acidic, with a hint of spiciness lent by black pepper and cumin.

The ingredients include water, sugar, salt, vegetables (onions, carrots, cauliflower, cucumbers), spices, pepper, mustard, turmeric, modified corn starch, hydrolized vegetable protein, sodium benzoate.

Many Costa Rican dishes are prepared with Lizano sauce, and it is ubiquitous on restaurant tables in its country of origin. It is commonly used with gallo pinto and tamales, and is also considered particularly complementary with eggs, rice, beans, fish, cheese, curries, and as a marinade for meat.

Lizano sauce is increasingly available commercially throughout North America through online retailers.

== History ==
The sauce was created initially by Próspero Jiménez in his bar in Alajuela. After success with the neighbors and acknowledging the success of imported bottled condiments, he approached Próspero Lizano who owned a factory, and then they established the brand and the green label for marketing. In 1991 Best Foods bought the company, and later were acquired by Unilever. In 2020, the condiment celebrated its 100th anniversary.

== See also ==
- Costa Rican cuisine
- Piccalilli
