= Bruce Foods =

American food manufacturing company

- Founded: 1928; 98 years ago
- Founder: Ignatius and Jonathan Bruce
- Headquarters: El Paso, Texas, United States
- Products: Mexican goods; Boxed mixes
- Brands: Cajun Injector; Casa Fiesta; Bruce's Pancake, Muffin and Biscuit Mixes; Cajun King; Mexene Chili
- Owner: Nissin Foods
- Website: www.brucefoods.com

Bruce Foods Corporation, founded in New Iberia, Louisiana, in 1928, is one of "America's largest privately owned food manufacturers," manufacturing many food products under five major labels, and is credited with "pioneering the canning of Mexican food." With four stateside manufacturing plants, the company has more than 1,200 employees.

Among its brands are Bruce Foods manufactures Cajun Injector marinades, Casa Fiesta Mexican Foods, Mexene Chili Products, and Choco Tacos.

== Bruce Foods Brands ==
Cajun Injector Injectable Marinades
Cajun Injector offers a variety of flavors with the most popular being Creole Butter and Creole Garlic.
Casa Fiesta Mexican Foods
Casa Fiesta offers Mexican prepared foods. It is the only major brand of Mexican food still produced in El Paso, TX. The line includes sauces, dips, shells, beans, rice, dinner kits, and seasoning mixes.
Mexene
Chili Powder. Today, Mexene is manufactured in El Paso, Texas, by Bruce Foods. The original recipe and manufacturing process remain the same as they were in 1906.
Cajun King Seasoning Mixes
A line of seafood mixes.

== Renewable energy practices ==
As part of its "Green Initiative", the company recently updated an 11,000 square feet (1,000 m^{2}) building in Wilson, North Carolina, with a renewable energy system designed to recover methane gas, a normal waste by-product that had, until now, been released into the atmosphere. The recovered gas assists with the plant's energy needs; additionally, the plant's water treatment system has accrued a 6-million-US-gallon (23,000 m^{3}) gas digester which is meant to ensure a more efficient water treatment process.

== Preferential treatment contested ==
In 2009, Bruce Foods contested the decision by the Louisiana state budget panel to award ConAgra Foods, Inc., with a multimillion-dollar contract to construct a sweet potato facility. On the Moon Griffon radio show, Bruce Foods President Si Brown charged that the state's economic development office, headed by Stephen Moret, had unnecessarily underwritten the out-of-state competitor with tax dollars. Brown asserted that his company could have built the plant in question for $1 million, whereas ConAgra was granted a $37 million contract. According to Moret, since Bruce Foods has been unwilling to open up their ledgers, they were automatically disqualified from receiving state economic loans. Brown countered that since Bruce Foods is a privately held company, they are not required to file financial disclosures.

== Cajun Injector lawsuit ==
Cajun Injector founder Chef Maurice "Reece" Williams sued Bruce Foods to the tune of $24 million in 2005, claiming that the company had not done due diligence promoting the product, as agreed upon when Williams sold his line of injectable marinades to Bruce Foods. According to a jury, Williams was unable to prove that he had been "fraudulently induced to sell the line of marinades", and instead ruled that Cajun Injector had breached the purchase agreement by not providing Bruce Foods with the marinade recipes. The jury also awarded Bruce Foods $224,000 in damages for debts incurred by Cajun Injector before the sale of purchase. Williams, however, was not held personally liable for any of the damages, which totaled $1.1 million.

== Sponsorship ==
In the past, the company has sponsored "bull riding events" and NASCAR races at Michigan International Speedway. Bruce Foods Corp. President Si Brown commented on this decision by telling The New York Times, "The real consumers who keep hot sauce factories running are from the inner city and blue collar and young people who have grown up with it. There's still a lot of growth potential, because young people like spicy food. And more and more cheap food is being sold which needs hot sauce for flavor."

In its more recent history, Bruce Foods' former label, Louisiana Hot Sauce, has partnered with Football Fanatics, an online retailer, "to create a football 'Tailgating' theme as a consumer driven promotion."

In anticipation of the 50th anniversary of the Daytona 500, Louisiana Hot Sauce was one of many products to be stamped with a commemorative "50th race logo" at the Midwestern grocery chain Kroger.

== Officers ==
- Chairman: Norman Brown Sr.
- President and CEO: Joseph S. "Si" Brown III

== Notes ==
Business America is a United States government publication that analyzes and covers American business and economic issues. It was followed by Export America, a now-defunct publication.
