= Hot sauce =

Condiment made from chili peppers

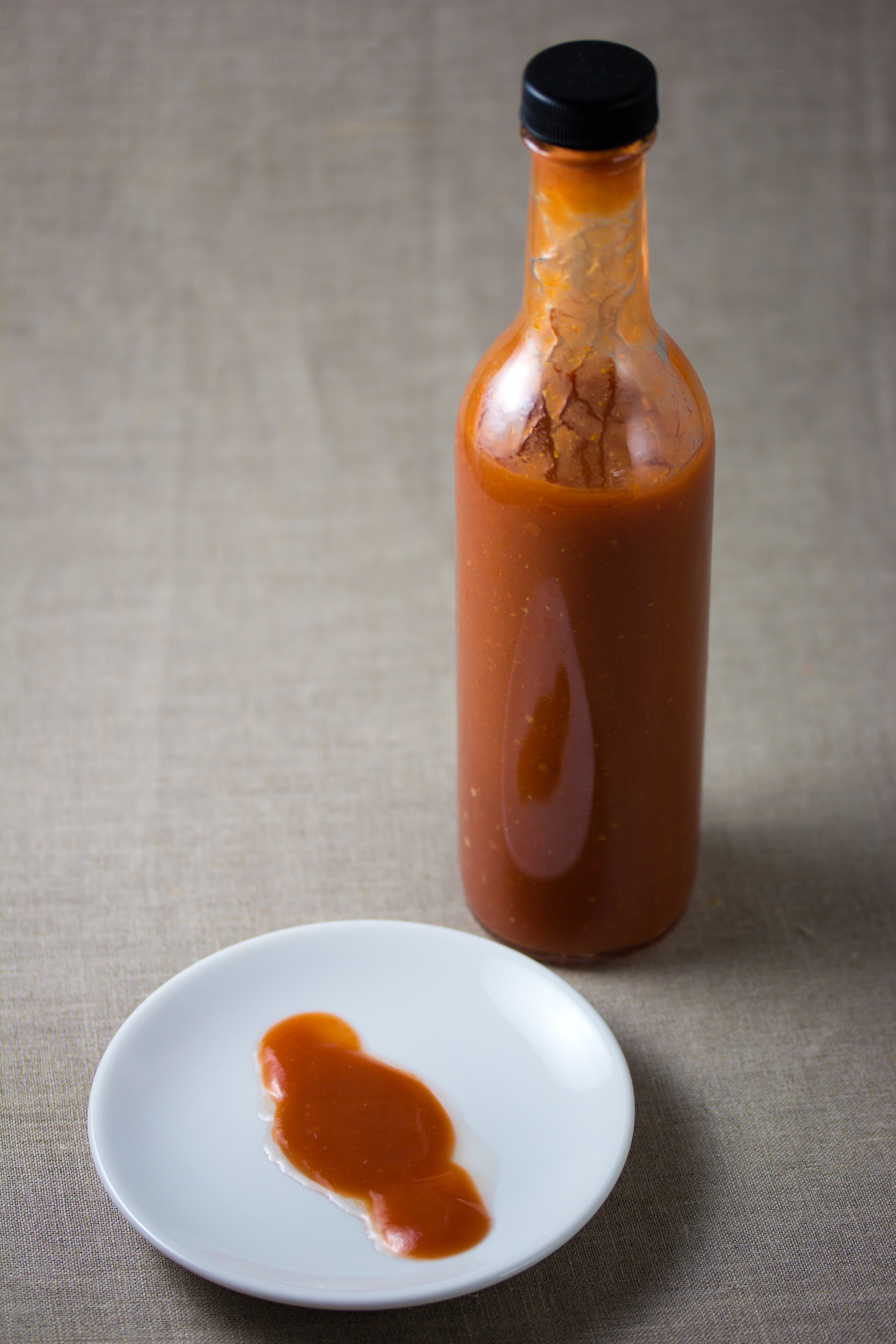
A fermented hot sauce

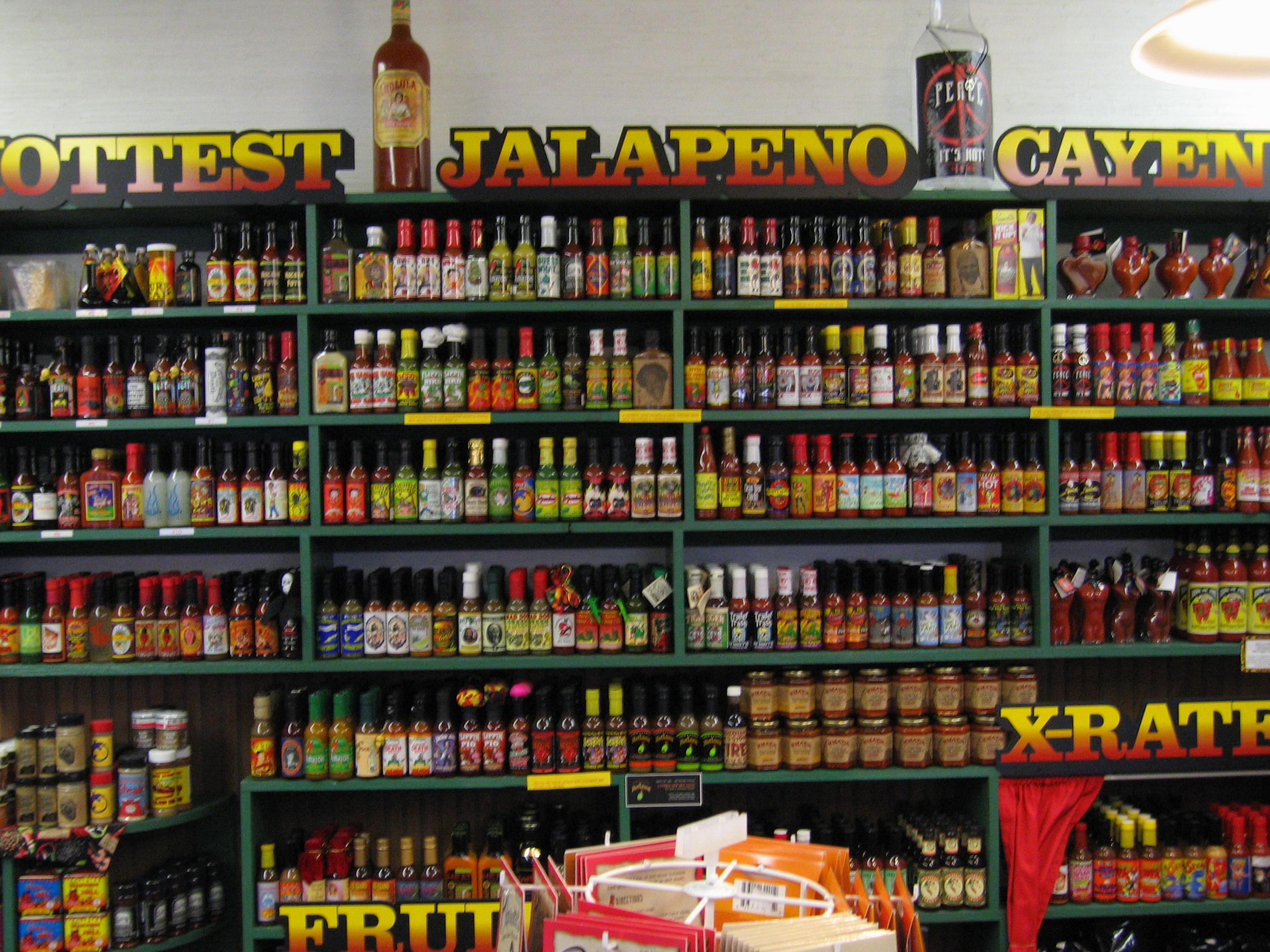
A wide variety of hot sauces seen in a store in 2004

Hot sauce is a type of condiment, seasoning, or salsa made from chili peppers and other ingredients. Many commercial varieties of mass-produced hot sauce exist.

== History ==
Humans have used chili peppers and other hot spices for thousands of years. One of the first commercially available bottled hot sauces in the United States appeared in 1807 in Massachusetts. However, few of the early brands from the 1800s survived to this day. Tabasco sauce, produced by the McIlhenny Company, is the earliest recognizable brand in the United States hot sauce industry, appearing in 1868. As of 2010, it was the 13th best-selling condiment in the United States preceded by Frank's RedHot Sauce in 12th place.

== Ingredients ==
Many recipes for hot sauces exist, but the only common ingredient is some variety of chili pepper. Many hot sauces are made by using chili peppers as the base and can be as simple as adding salt and vinegar. Other sauces use some type of fruits or vegetables as the base and add the chili peppers to make them hot. Manufacturers use many different processes from fermentation, aging in containers, and pureeing and cooking the ingredients to achieve a desired flavor. Because of their ratings on the Scoville scale, spicier peppers such as the ghost pepper, Scotch bonnet or habanero pepper are sometimes used to make hotter sauces. Alternatively, other ingredients can be used to add extra heat, such as pure capsaicin extract or mustard oil. Other common sauce ingredients include vinegar and spices. Vinegar is used primarily as a natural preservative, but flavored vinegars can be used to alter the flavour.

== Styles ==
=== Americas ===
==== Belize ====
Belizean hot sauces are usually extremely hot and use habaneros, carrots, and onions as primary ingredients. Marie Sharp's is a popular brand of hot sauce produced in the Stann Creek Valley.

==== Bermuda ====
Bermudian sherry peppers sauce is made from a base of Spanish sherry wine and hot peppers. The major producer on the island is Outerbridge Peppers.

==== Caribbean ====
Hot pepper sauces, as they are most commonly known there, feature heavily in Caribbean cuisine. They are prepared from chilli peppers and vinegar, with fruits and vegetables added for extra flavor. The most common peppers used are habanero and Scotch bonnet, the latter being the most common in Jamaica. Both are very hot peppers, making for strong sauces. Over the years, each island developed its own distinctive recipes, and home-made sauces are still common.

==== Trinidad ====
Trinidad Scorpion is considered one of the hottest and most frutal families of strains, and is primarily cultivated and hybridized in the United States, United Kingdom, and Australia.

==== Barbados ====
Bajan pepper sauce, a mustard and Scotch bonnet pepper based hot sauce.

==== Haiti ====
Sauce Ti-malice, typically made with habanero, shallots, lime juice, garlic and sometimes tomatoes

==== Puerto Rico ====
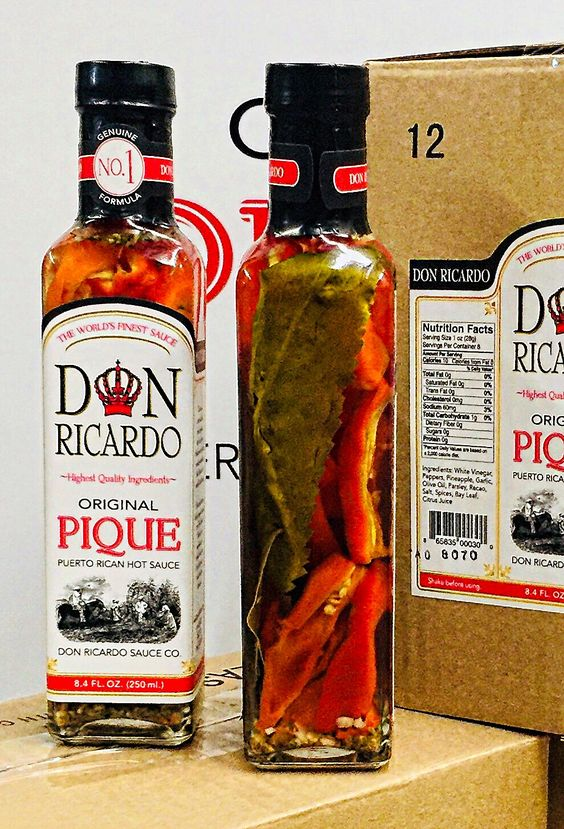
Pique sauce

Sofrito—small piquins ("bird peppers") with annatto seeds, coriander leaves, onions, garlic, and tomatoes. Pique (/ˈpiːk/) sauce is a Puerto Rican hot sauce made by steeping hot peppers in vinegar. Don Ricardo Original Pique Sauce, which is made with pineapple, is a Puerto Rican staple. Don Ricardo originated in Utuado (Spanish pronunciation: [uˈtwaðo]) a municipality of Puerto Rico located in the central mountainous region of the island known as La Cordillera Central.

==== Jamaica ====
Scotch bonnets are the most popular peppers used in Jamaica. Pickapeppa sauce is a Jamaican sauce.

==== Chile ====
The most popular sauce is the Diaguitas brand, made of pure red (very hot) or yellow (hot) Chilean peppers mixed only with water and salt. Other hot sauces are made from puta madre, cacho de cabra, rocoto, oro and cristal peppers, mixed with various ingredients. Mild hot sauces include some "creamy style" (like ají crema), or a pebre-style sauce, from many local producers, varying in hotness and quality.

==== Mexico ====
Mexican cuisine more often includes chopped chili peppers, but when hot sauces are used, they are typically focused more on flavor than on intense heat. Chipotle peppers are a very popular ingredient of Mexican hot sauce. Vinegar is used sparingly or not at all in Mexican sauces, but some particular styles are high in vinegar content similar to the American Louisiana-style sauces. Some hot sauces may include using the seeds from the popular achiote plant for coloring or a slight flavor additive. The process of adobos (marinade) has been used in the past as a preservative but now it is mainly used to enhance the flavor of the peppers and they rely more on the use of vinegar. Mexican-style sauces are primarily produced in Mexico but they are also produced internationally. The Spanish term for sauce is salsa, and in English-speaking countries usually refers to the often tomato-based, hot sauces typical of Mexican cuisine, particularly those used as dips. There are many types of salsa which usually vary throughout Latin America.

These are some of the notable companies producing Mexican style hot sauce.

- Búfalo: A popular Mexican sauce
- Cholula Hot Sauce: Known for its iconic round wooden cap
- Valentina: A traditional Mexican sauce
- El Yucateco: A popular Mexican sauce

==== Panama ====
Traditional Panamanian hot sauce is usually made with "Aji Chombo", Scotch Bonnet peppers. Picante Chombo D'Elidas is a popular brand in Panama, with three major sauces. The yellow sauce, made with habanero and mustard, is the most distinctive. They also produce red and green varieties which are heavier on vinegar content and without mustard. Although the majority of Panamanian cuisine lacks in spice, D'Elidas is seen as an authentic Panamanian hot sauce usually serviced with rice with chicken or soups.

==== United States ====
In the United States, commercially produced chili sauces are assigned various grades per their quality. These grades include U.S. Grade A (also known as U.S. Fancy), U.S. Grade C (also known as U.S. Standard) and Substandard. Criteria in food grading for chili sauces in the U.S. includes coloration, consistency, character, absence of defects and flavor.

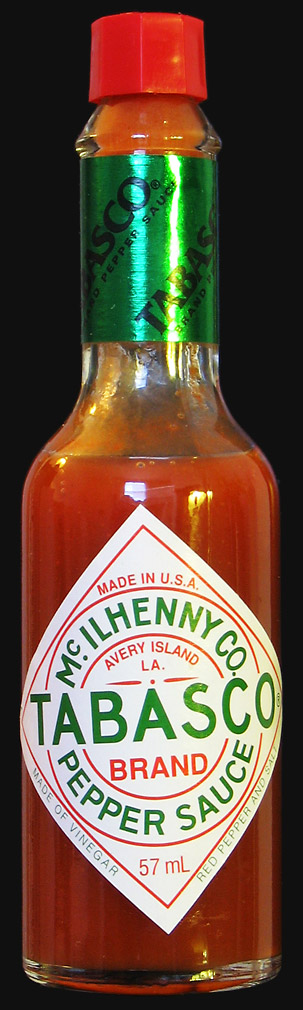
Original Tabasco red pepper sauce

The varieties of peppers that are used often are cayenne, chipotle, habanero and jalapeño. Some hot sauces, notably Tabasco sauce, are aged in wooden casks similar to the preparation of wine and fermented vinegar. Other ingredients, including fruits and vegetables such as raspberries, mangoes, carrots, and chayote squash are sometimes used to add flavor, mellow the heat of the chilis, and thicken the sauce's consistency. Artisan hot sauces are manufactured by smaller producers and private labels in the United States. Their products are produced in smaller quantities in a variety of flavors. Many sauces have a theme to catch consumers attention. A very mild chili sauce is produced by Heinz and other manufacturers, and is frequently found in cookbooks in the U.S. This style chili sauce is based on tomatoes, green and/or red bell peppers, and spices; and contains little chili pepper. This sauce is more akin to tomato ketchup and cocktail sauce than predominantly chili pepper-based sauces.

A type of sriracha sauce manufactured in California by Huy Fong Foods has become increasingly popular in the United States in contemporary times.

Tapatío hot sauce is popular among Mexican-American communities and the broader US population. It is based on a style of sauce found in Jalisco.

===== Louisiana-style =====
Louisiana-style hot sauce contains red chili peppers (tabasco and/or cayenne are the most popular), vinegar and salt. Occasionally xanthan gum or other thickeners are used.

- Louisiana Hot Sauce (450 Scoville Heat Units (SHU) Introduced in 1928, A cayenne pepper based hot sauce produced by Southeastern Mills, Inc., in New Iberia, Louisiana.
- Crystal Hot Sauce (4,000 SHU) is a brand of Louisiana-style hot sauce produced by family-owned Baumer Foods since 1923.
- Tabasco sauce (2,500 SHU) The earliest recognizable brand in the hot sauce industry, first appearing in 1868.
- Frank's Red Hot (450 SHU) Claims to be the primary ingredient in the first Buffalo wing sauce.
- Texas Pete (750 SHU) Introduced in 1929, developed and manufactured by the TW Garner Food Company in Winston-Salem, North Carolina
- Trappey's Hot Sauce Company was founded in 1898.
- Chili pepper water, used primarily in Hawaii, is ideal for cooking. It is made from whole chilies, garlic, salt, and water. Often homemade, the pungent end product must be sealed carefully to prevent leakage.

===== New Mexico =====
New Mexico chile sauces differ from others in that they contain no vinegar. Almost every traditional New Mexican dish is served with red or green chile sauce, the towns of Hatch, Chimayo, the Albuquerque area, and others in New Mexico are well known for their peppers. The sauce is often added to meats, eggs, vegetables, breads, and some dishes are, in fact, mostly chile sauce with a modest addition of pork, beef, or beans.

- Green chile: This sauce is prepared from any fire roasted green chile peppers are common varieties. The skins are removed and peppers diced. Onions are fried in lard or butter, and a roux is prepared. Broth and chile peppers are added to the roux and thickened. Its consistency is similar to gravy, and it is used as such. It also is used as a salsa.
- Red chile: A roux is made from lard and flour. The dried ground pods of native red chiles are added. Water is added and the sauce is thickened.

=== Others ===
==== Australia ====
The availability of a variety of hot sauces is a recent event in most of Australia. Before 2000, there was little more choice than the flagship brand of Tabasco Cayenne sauce predominantly used in restaurants and sold in supermarkets. Although today, two of the most popular picks are the Buffalo and Sriracha hot sauces. There's also locally produced versions of Habanero and Trinidad Scorpion ranges available.

==== United Kingdom ====
Two of the hottest chilies in the world, the Naga Viper and Infinity chili were developed in the United Kingdom and are available as sauces which have been claimed to be the hottest natural chili sauces (without added pepper extract) available in the world. The Naga Viper and Infinity were considered the hottest two chili peppers in the world until the Naga Viper was unseated by the Trinidad Moruga Scorpion in late 2011.

=== Lebanon ===
Shatta Sauce is a traditional Lebanese hot sauce made from fresh chili peppers, salt, oil and vinegar. It adds a spicy kick to dishes like falafel, shawarma, and grilled meats.

== Heat ==
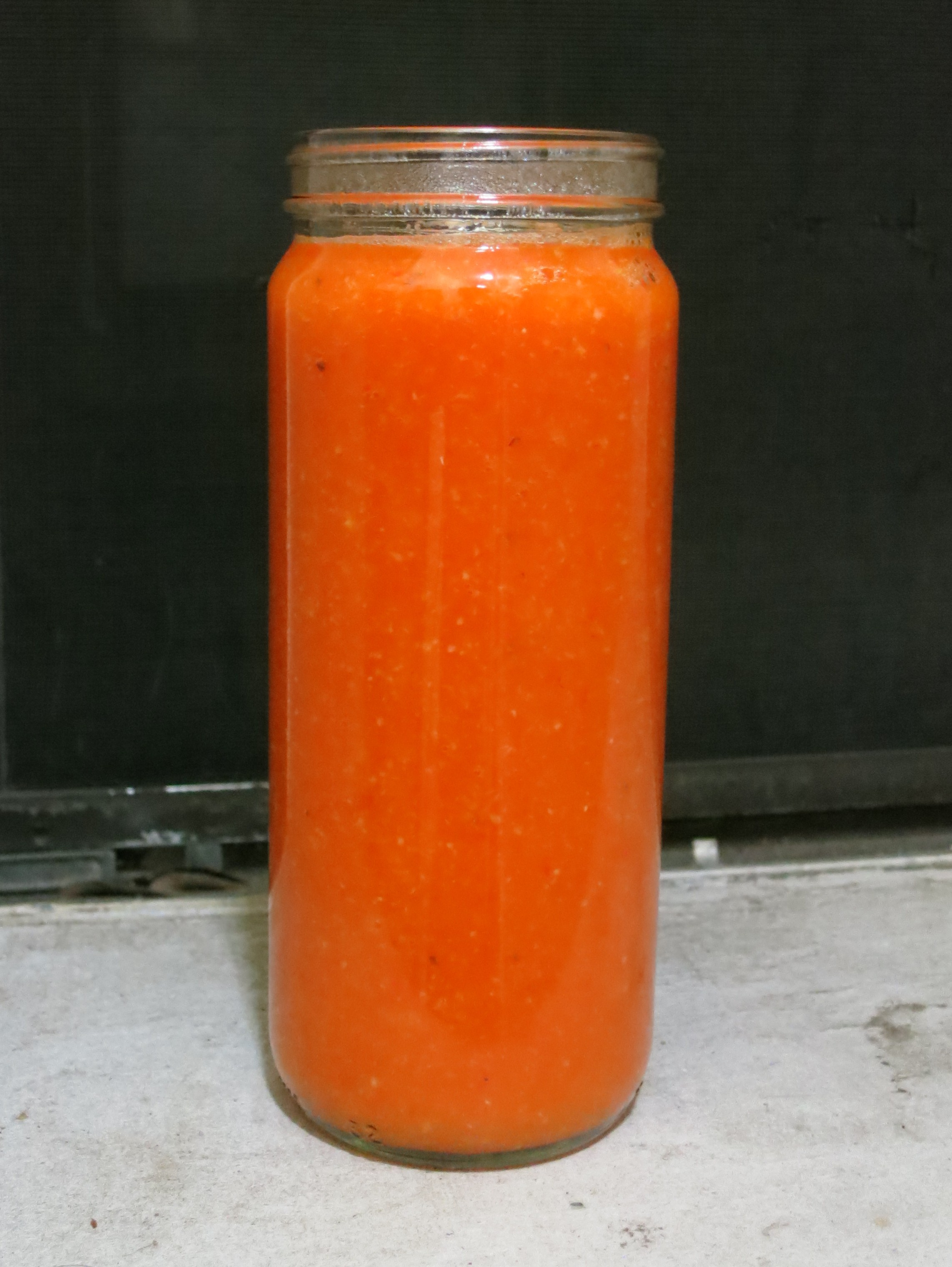
Habanero, bell pepper, and garlic hot sauce

The heat, or burning sensation, experienced when consuming hot sauce is caused by capsaicin and related capsaicinoids. The burning sensation is caused by the capsaicin activation of the TRPV1 heat and ligand-gated ion channel in peripheral neurons. The mechanism of action is then a chemical interaction with the neurological system. Although the "burning" sensation does not correspond to a real stimulus, repeated and prolonged use of hot spices may harm the peripheral heat-sensing neurons; this mechanism may explain why frequent spice users become less sensitive to both spices and heat.

Foods containing capsaicin, like hot sauces, can have different effects on each individual. Those with stomach issues can experience worse symptoms than just the “burning” sensation. People with irritable bowel syndrome (IBS) can have gas, diarrhea, or stomach pains after ingesting hot sauces.

The seemingly subjective perceived heat of hot sauces can be measured by the Scoville scale. The Scoville scale number indicates how many times something must be diluted with an equal volume of water until people can no longer feel any sensation from the capsaicin. The hottest hot sauce scientifically possible is one rated at 16 million Scoville units, which is pure capsaicin. An example of a hot sauce marketed as achieving this level of heat is Blair's 16 Million Reserve, marketed by Blair's Sauces and Snacks. By comparison, the original Tabasco sauce is rated between 2,500 and 5,000 Scoville units (batches vary) - with one of the mildest commercially available sauces, Cackalacky Classic Sauce Company's Spice Sauce, weighing in at less than 1000 Scoville units on the standard heat scale.

=== Rating ===
A general way to estimate the heat of a sauce is to look at the ingredients list. Sauces tend to vary in heat based on the kind of peppers used, and the further down the list, the less the amount of pepper.

- Cayenne - Sauces made with cayenne, including most of the Louisiana-style sauces, are usually hotter than jalapeño, but milder than other sauces.
- Chile de árbol - A thin and potent Mexican chili pepper also known as bird's beak chile and rat's tail chile. Their heat index used to be between 15,000 and 30,000 Scoville units, but it can now reach over 100,000 units. In cooking substitutions, the Chile de árbol pepper can be traded with Cayenne pepper.
- Habanero - Habanero pepper sauces were known as the hottest natural pepper sauces, but nowadays species like Bhut jolokia, Naga jolokia or Trinidad Scorpion Moruga are even five or ten-fold hotter.
- Jalapeño - These sauces include green and red jalapeño chilis, and chipotle (ripened and smoked). Green jalapeño and chipotle are usually the mildest sauces available. Red jalapeño sauce is generally hotter.
- Naga Bhut Jolokia - The pepper is also known as Bhut Jolokia, ghost pepper, ghost chili pepper, red naga chilli, and ghost chilli. In 2007, Guinness World Records certified that the Ghost Pepper (Bhut Jolokia) was the world's hottest chili pepper, 400 times hotter than Tabasco sauce; however, in 2011 it has since been superseded by the Trinidad Moruga Scorpion.
- Piri piri - The Peri Peri pepper has been naturalized into South Africa and is also known as the African Bird's Eye pepper, Piri-Piri pepper or Pili-Pili pepper, depending on what area of the country you're in. The pepper ranges from one half to one inch in length and tapers at a blunt point. The small package packs a mighty punch with a 175,000 rating on the Scoville scale, near the Habanero, but the Peri Peri is smaller and has a much different flavor. It is most commonly used in a hot sauce, combined with other spices and seasonings because it has a very light, fresh citrus-herbal flavor that blends well with the flavors of most other ingredients.
- Scotch Bonnet - Similar in heat to the Habanero are these peppers popular in the Caribbean. Often found in Jamaican hot sauces.
- Tabasco peppers - Sauces made with tabasco peppers are generally hotter than cayenne pepper sauces. Along with Tabasco, a number of sauces are made using tabasco peppers.
- Trinidad Moruga Scorpion The golf ball-sized chili pepper has a tender fruit-like flavor. According to the New Mexico State University Chile Institute, the Trinidad Scorpion Moruga Blend ranks as high as 2,009,231 SHU on the Scoville scale.
- Carolina Reaper - The Carolina Reaper is a super hot pepper which has been described as a roasted sweetness delivering an instant level of heat. Developed by Puckerbutt Founder Ed Currie in Rock Hill, South Carolina, the Carolina Reaper averages over 1.6 million SHU and was awarded the Guinness World Record in August 2017.
- Capsaicin extract - The hottest sauces are made from capsaicin extract. These range from extremely hot pepper sauce blends to pure capsaicin extracts. These sauces are extremely hot and should be considered with caution by those not used to fiery foods. Many are too hot to consume more than a drop or two in a pot of food. These novelty sauces are typically only sold by specialty retailers and are usually more expensive.
- Other ingredients - heat is also affected by other ingredients. Mustard oil and wasabi can be added to increase the sensation of heat but generally, more ingredients in a sauce dilute the effect of the chilis, resulting in a milder flavor. Many sauces contain tomatoes, carrots, onions, garlic or other vegetables and seasonings. Vinegar or lemon juice are also common ingredients in many hot sauces because their acidity will help keep the sauce from oxidizing, thus acting as a preservative.

== Remedies ==
Capsaicinoids are the chemicals responsible for the "hot" taste of chili peppers. They are fat-soluble and therefore water will be of no assistance when countering the burn. The most effective way to relieve the burning sensation is with dairy products, such as milk and yogurt. A protein called casein occurs in dairy products which binds to the capsaicin, effectively making it less available to "burn" the mouth, and the milk fat helps keep it in suspension. Rice is also useful for mitigating the effect, especially when it is included with a mouthful of the hot food. These foods are typically included in the cuisine of cultures that specialise in the use of chilis. Mechanical stimulation of the mouth by chewing food will also partially mask the pain sensation.

== See also ==
- Chili pepper water
- Jerk spice, a marinade of spices and hot peppers commonly used in Jamaican cuisine.
- List of hot sauces
- Pepper jelly
- Hottest chili pepper
- Sambal, sauce typically made from a variety of chili peppers.
- Scoville scale
