= Scorpion pepper =

Scorpion pepper may refer to two chili pepper cultivars:

- Trinidad moruga scorpion
- Trinidad Scorpion Butch T pepper
