= Chili pepper water =

Condiment

- Alternative names: wai nīoi
- Type: Condiment
- Place of origin: United States
- Region or state: Hawaii
- Main ingredients: Red chili peppers
- Ingredients generally used: Salt, water

Chili pepper water, calqued from its Hawaiian name wai nīoi, is a condiment originating from Hawaii. In its most basic form, it is prepared from red chili peppers, salt, and water.

Chili pepper water is historically a homemade concoction used in household kitchens and restaurants. Traditionally the Hawaiian chili pepper (nīoi) is used, but others may be substituted.
