= Tapatío hot sauce =

American hot sauce

Tapatío Hot Sauce
- Logo since 1997
- Industry: Food production
- Founded: 1971
- Founder: Jose-Luis Saavedra Sr.
- Headquarters: Vernon, California, U.S.
- Area served: North America
- Products: Hot sauce
- Heat: Low
- Scoville scale: 3,000 SHU
- Website: www.tapatiohotsauce.com

Tapatío is an American hot sauce produced in Vernon, California. It is popular in the United States, predominantly among Mexican-American communities.

== History ==
The recipe for the hot sauce was created by the wife of Jose-Luis Saavedra Sr., who decided to sell it after losing his aerospace-industry job in the late 1960s. The Tapatío Hot Sauce company was started in 1971 in a small warehouse in Maywood, California. It launched under the name Cuervo, which was Saavedra's wife's maiden name, but after 4 years, the company sold the rights to that name to the Jose Cuervo tequila company. The Tapatío name was adopted in 1975. "Tapatío" is a term used to describe someone from Guadalajara, Jalisco and the package art depicts a romanticized charro from Jalisco. The product slogan is Es una salsa...muy salsa! (lit. 'It's a sauce...very saucy!').

In 1985, the company moved to a 7000-square-foot (650 m^{2}) facility in Vernon, California, 5 miles (8.0 km) from Downtown Los Angeles. Although larger than the first location, the new factory had a single loading dock and limited storage space, which created a new series of problems for the company. A new 30000-square-foot (2800 m^{2}) facility followed in 1996. By 2021, the company was bottling 200,000 units a day, with exports to 30 countries.

In January 2026, the Saavedra family sold Tapatío Hot Sauce to the private equity firm Highlander Partners, but retained a minority stake and remained involved in management. Highlander declined to reveal the terms of the deal.

The ingredients listed on the product label are water, red peppers, salt, spices, garlic, acetic acid, xanthan gum and sodium benzoate as a preservative. The company claims that the exact recipe was transmitted only by word of mouth until 2026, when it was written down at the time of the company's sale. Measuring the ingredients for a batch of sauce according to the original ratios is still carried out in a locked room of the factory.

Tapatío comes in five sizes: 5, 10, and 32 U.S. fluid ounces (148, 296, and 946 mL) and 1 U.S. gallon (3.78 L), as well as in 1/4-ounce (7 g) packets. The packet format was developed for the US military.

Tapatío Ramen was introduced in 2018. In 2021, to celebrate the brand's 50th anniversary, they collaborated with Gabriel Iglesias for a special edition of the hot sauce Tapatio X Fluffy. Tapatío launched cross-brand products such as Tapatío-flavored Doritos, Ruffles, Fritos, Budweiser (Chelada Fuego), and HipDot (cosmetics products).

In 2014, the brand was featured whimsically in an exhibit, LA Heat: Taste Changing Condiments, at the Chinese American Museum in Los Angeles. According to Jose-Luis Saavedra, a bottle of Tapatío hot sauce was displayed at the Smithsonian Institution.

== See also ==
- List of hot sauces
