= Texas Pete =

American-made hot sauce

Texas Pete Hot Sauce
- Current owner: T.W. Garner Food Company
- Introduced: 1929
- Website: www.texaspete.com

Texas Pete is a brand of hot sauce in the United States developed and manufactured by the TW Garner Food Company in Winston-Salem, North Carolina. TW Garner was founded by Thad W. Garner in 1929. As of 2022, Texas Pete is the seventh-best selling hot sauce in the U.S., according to Instacart, an online grocery service.

== History ==
Texas Pete hot sauce was introduced in 1929 by Sam Garner who had 3 sons (Thad W., Ralph C. and Harold H.), operator of the Dixie Pig barbecue stand in Winston-Salem, North Carolina. Customers asked for a spicier sauce, and the Garners concocted one with cayenne peppers. Developing a product name, a marketing adviser suggested "Mexican Joe" to connote the spicy cuisine of Mexico. However, Sam Garner opposed this, saying that the name should be American. Texas is known for its spicy food; this was combined with Pete, the nickname of his son Harold Garner.

== Products ==
The brand has 6, 12, and 24 ounce bottles with bright red sauce, flip top, and white and yellow label featuring the name in red and "Texas Pete," a red silhouette cowboy. Texas Pete is fairly mild, registering 747 on the Scoville heat scale. Its auxiliary branded Hotter Hot Sauce is claimed to be three times hotter than original Texas Pete. Texas Pete also makes a sautéed garlic hot sauce. In 2013, Texas Pete introduced the "Cha!" Sriracha sauce. Sabor! by Texas Pete was released in 2016 as their Mexican style hot sauce. In 2015, the TW Garner Food Company discontinued production of its Texas Pete Chili Sauce for hot dogs and hamburgers.

== See also ==
- List of hot sauces
- Hot sauce
- Scoville heat scale
