= Cayenne pepper =

Hot chili pepper used to flavor dishes

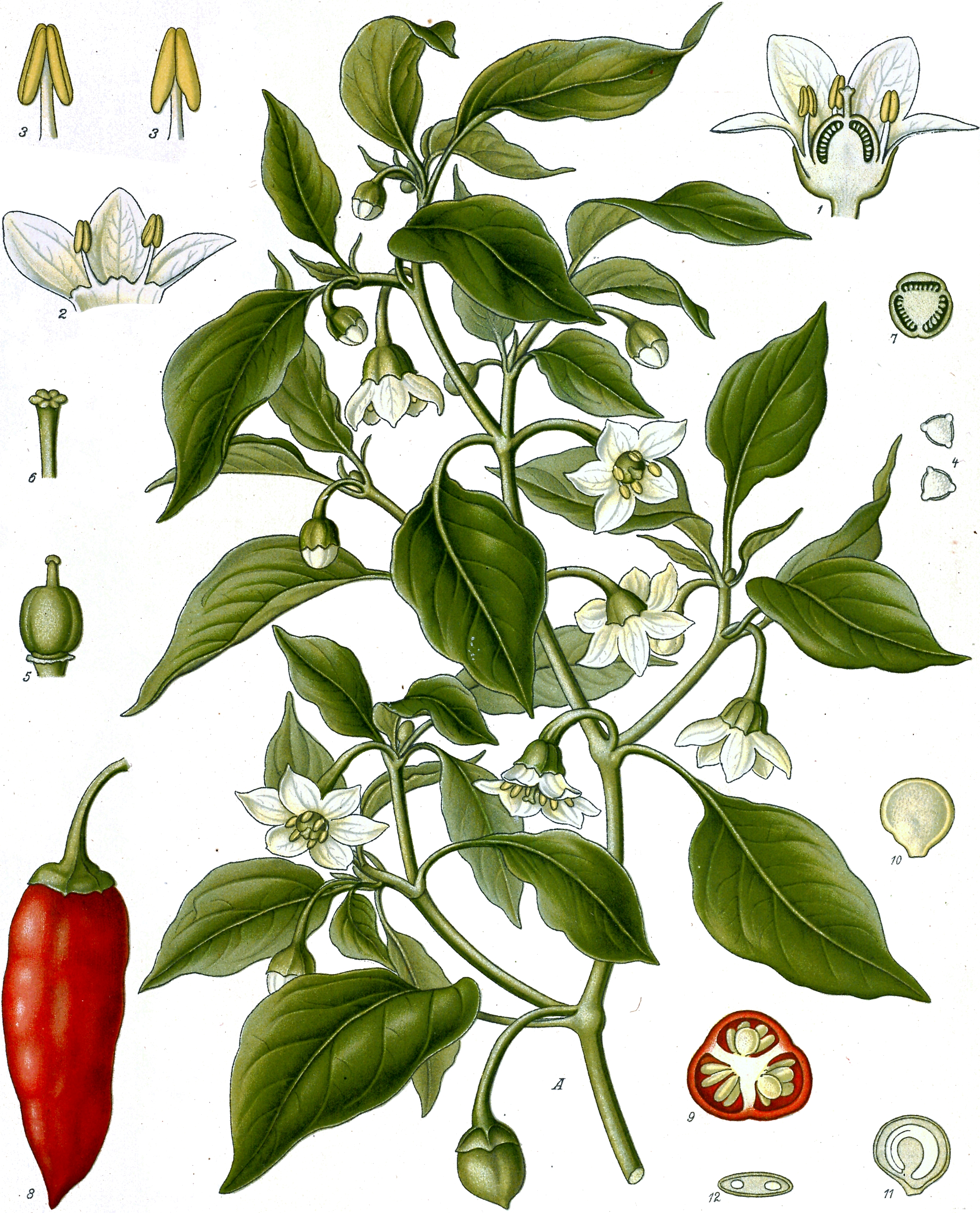
- Genus: Capsicum
- Species: C. annuum
- Cultivar: Cayenne
- Heat: Hot
- Scoville scale: 30,000–50,000 SHU

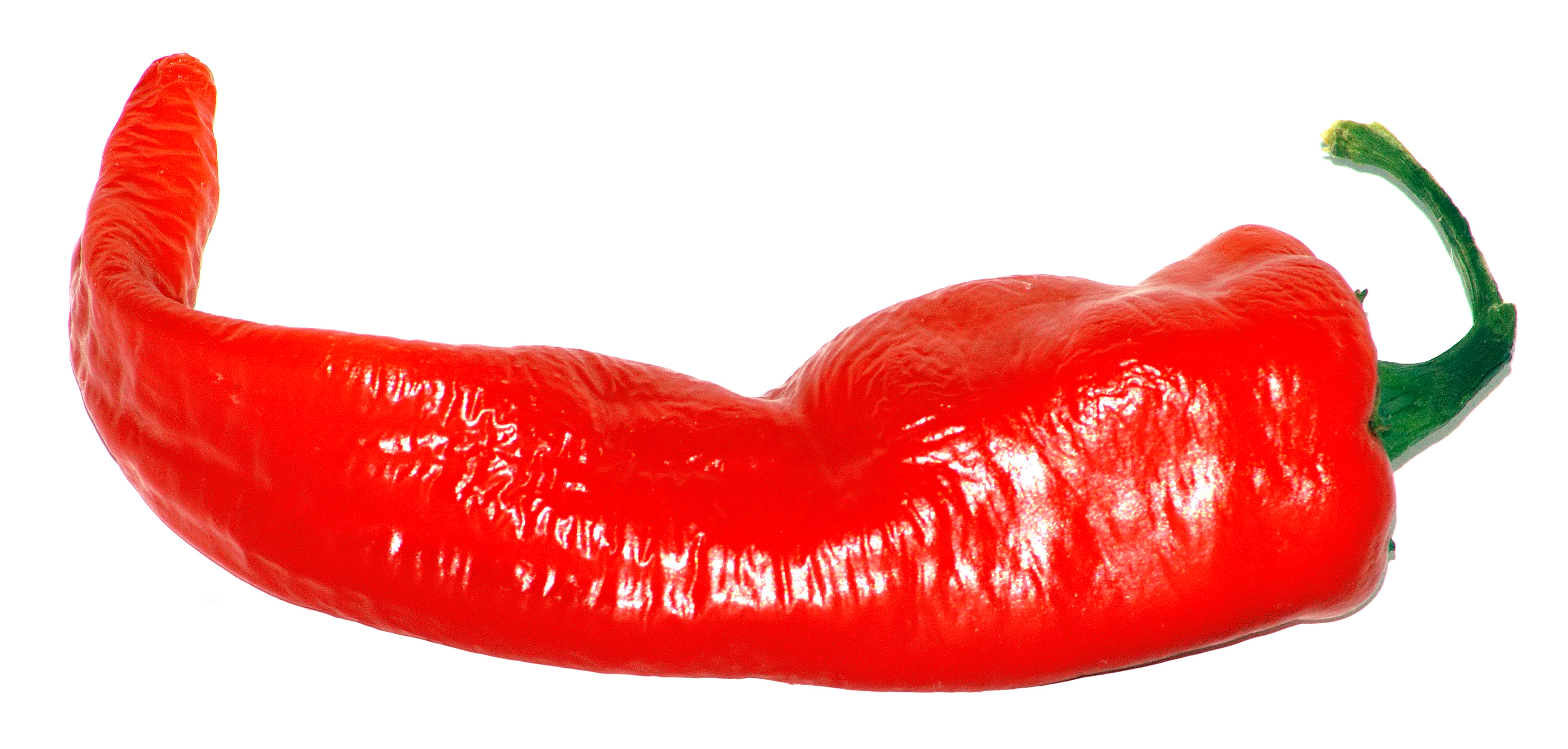
A large red cayenne

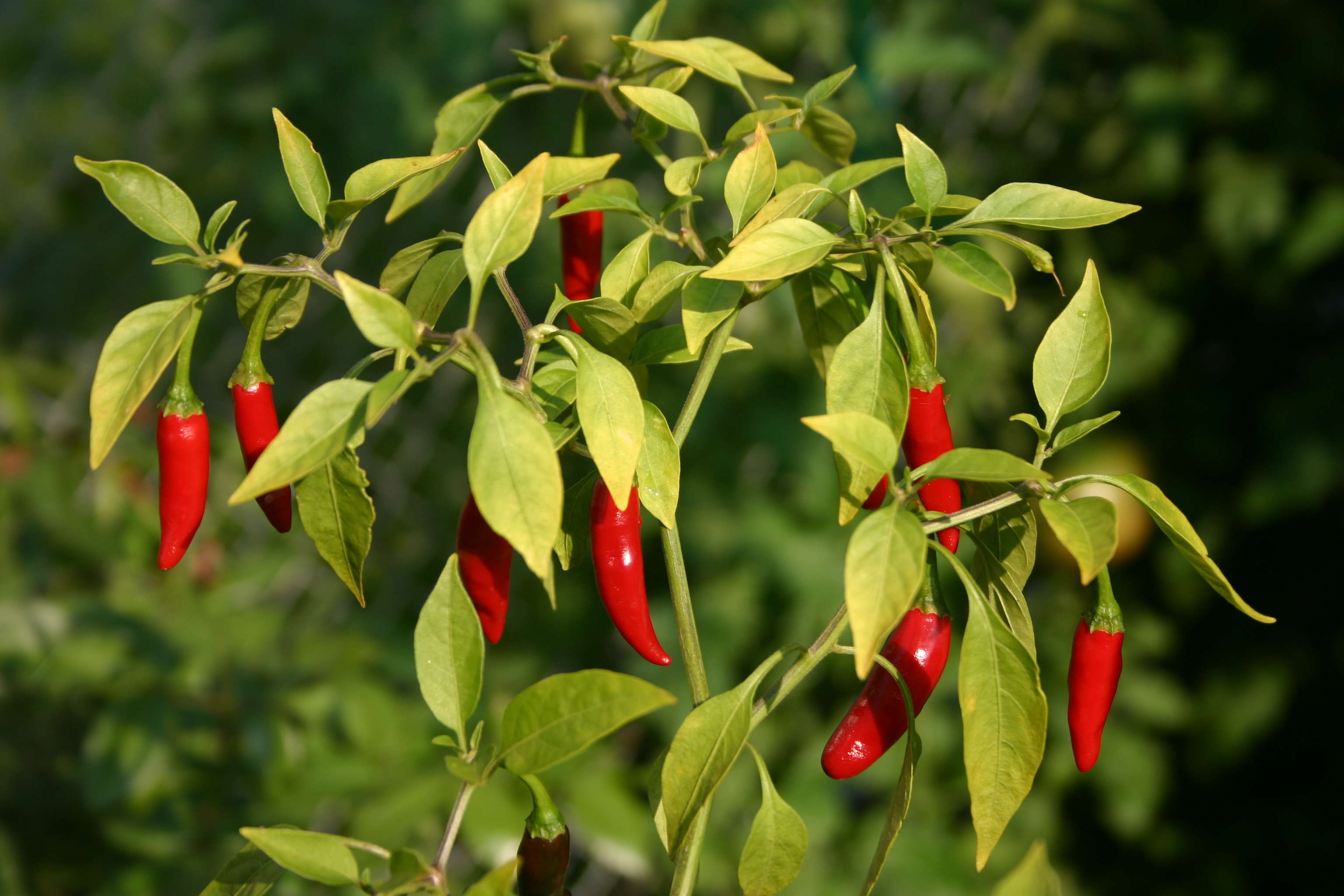
Thai peppers, a cayenne-type pepper

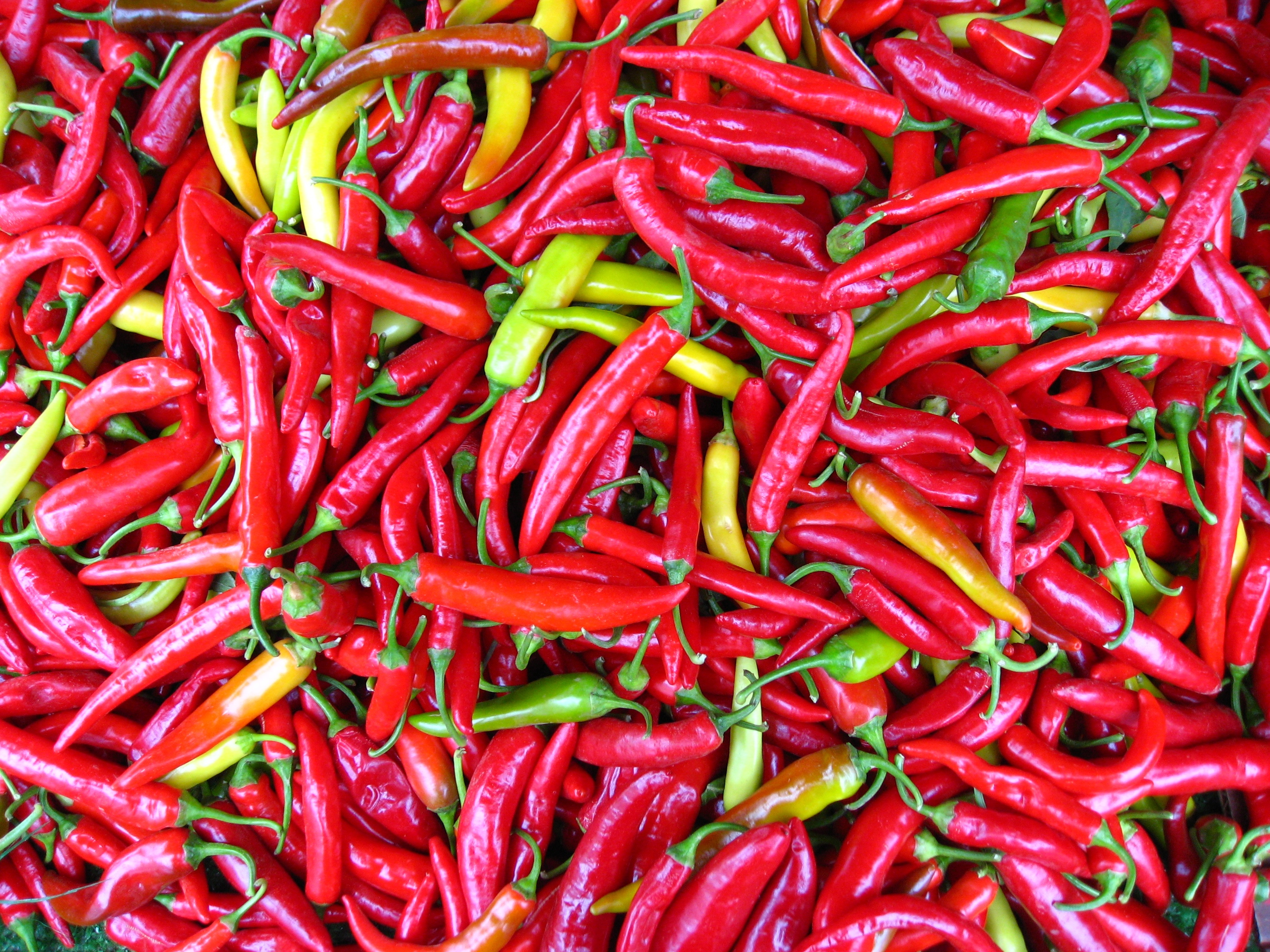
Capsicum frutescens

Cayenne peppers are a group of tapering, 10 to 25 cm long, generally skinny, mostly red-colored pepper varieties, often with a curved tip and somewhat rippled skin, which hang from the bush as opposed to growing upright. Most varieties are generally rated at 30,000 to 50,000 Scoville units.

The fruits are generally dried and ground to make the powdered spice of the same name. However, cayenne powder may be a blend of different types of peppers, quite often not containing cayenne peppers, and may or may not contain the seeds.

Cayenne is used in cooking spicy dishes either as a powder or in its whole form. It is also used as a herbal supplement, due to its active compound, capsaicin. They are also nutritious and they are especially rich in provitamin A, carotenoids and vitamin C.

== Etymology ==
The word cayenne is thought to be a corruption of the word kyynha, meaning "capsicum" in the Old Tupi language once spoken in Brazil. Cayenne, the capital city of French Guiana is related to the name, and may have been named for the pepper or the Cayenne River.

English botanist Nicholas Culpeper used the phrase "cayenne pepper" in 1652.

== Taxonomy ==
The cayenne pepper is a type of Capsicum annuum, as are bell peppers, jalapeños, pimientos, and many others. The genus Capsicum is in the nightshade family, Solanaceae. Cayenne peppers are often said to belong to the frutescens variety, but frutescens peppers are now defined as peppers (such as tabasco peppers) which have fruit which grow upright on the bush. What are known in English as cayenne peppers are therefore, by definition, not frutescens. (Note: However, in French, for example, the name piment de Cayenne may refer to all types of C. frutescens and other types of C. annuum including tabasco, piri-piri or Bird's eye chili.) Culpeper, in his Complete Herbal from 1653, mentions cayenne pepper as a synonym for what he calls "pepper (guinea)". (Note: The name Guinea pepper often means Aframomum melegueta or Piper guineense at present, but in Britain in the 16th and 17th century "Guinea pepper" or "ginny pepper" was the common name for Capsicum peppers in general.) By the end of the 19th century "Guinea pepper" had come to mean bird's eye chili or piri-piri, although he refers to Capsicum peppers in general in his entry.

In the 19th century, modern cayenne peppers were classified as C. longum. This name was later synonymised with C. frutescens. Cayenne powder, however, has generally been made from the bird's eye peppers, in the 19th century classified as C. minimum.

== Varieties ==
Cayenne peppers are long, tapering, 10 to 25 centimetres (4 to 10 in) generally skinny, mostly red-colored peppers, often with a curved tip and somewhat rippled skin, and hang from the bush, as opposed to growing upright.

There are many specific cultivars, such as Cow-horn, Cayenne Sweet, Cayenne Buist's Yellow, Golden Cayenne, Cayenne Carolina, Cayenne Indonesian, Joe's Long, Cayenne Large Red Thick, Cayenne Long Thick Red, Ring of Fire, Cayenne Passion, Cayenne Thomas Jefferson, Cayenne Iberian, Cayenne Turkish, Egyptian Cayenne, Cayenne Violet or NuMex Las Cruces Cayenne. Although most modern cayenne peppers are red, there are yellow and purple varieties and, in the 19th century, yellow varieties were common. Most types are hot, although there are several mild variants. Most varieties are generally rated at 30,000 to 50,000 Scoville units, although some are rated at 20,000 or less.

== History ==
Cayenne peppers have been cultivated by indigenous people of the Americas for 7,000 years. They were introduced to the rest of the world by Christopher Columbus, around 1493, during his voyages to the New World. They originated in what is now French Guiana. Cayenne peppers were considered "the poor man's pepper" as there was a shortage of spices in Europe at the time of their discovery. Pepper was seen as a sign of luxury. The shortage of spices was caused by myths of their origins and heavy taxes by the Ottoman Empire and other lands the spices were transported in. Cayenne peppers had a big role in ending the spice shortage because they were easy to grow, and could be a substitute for expensive, high-demand spices like black pepper.

== In cuisine ==
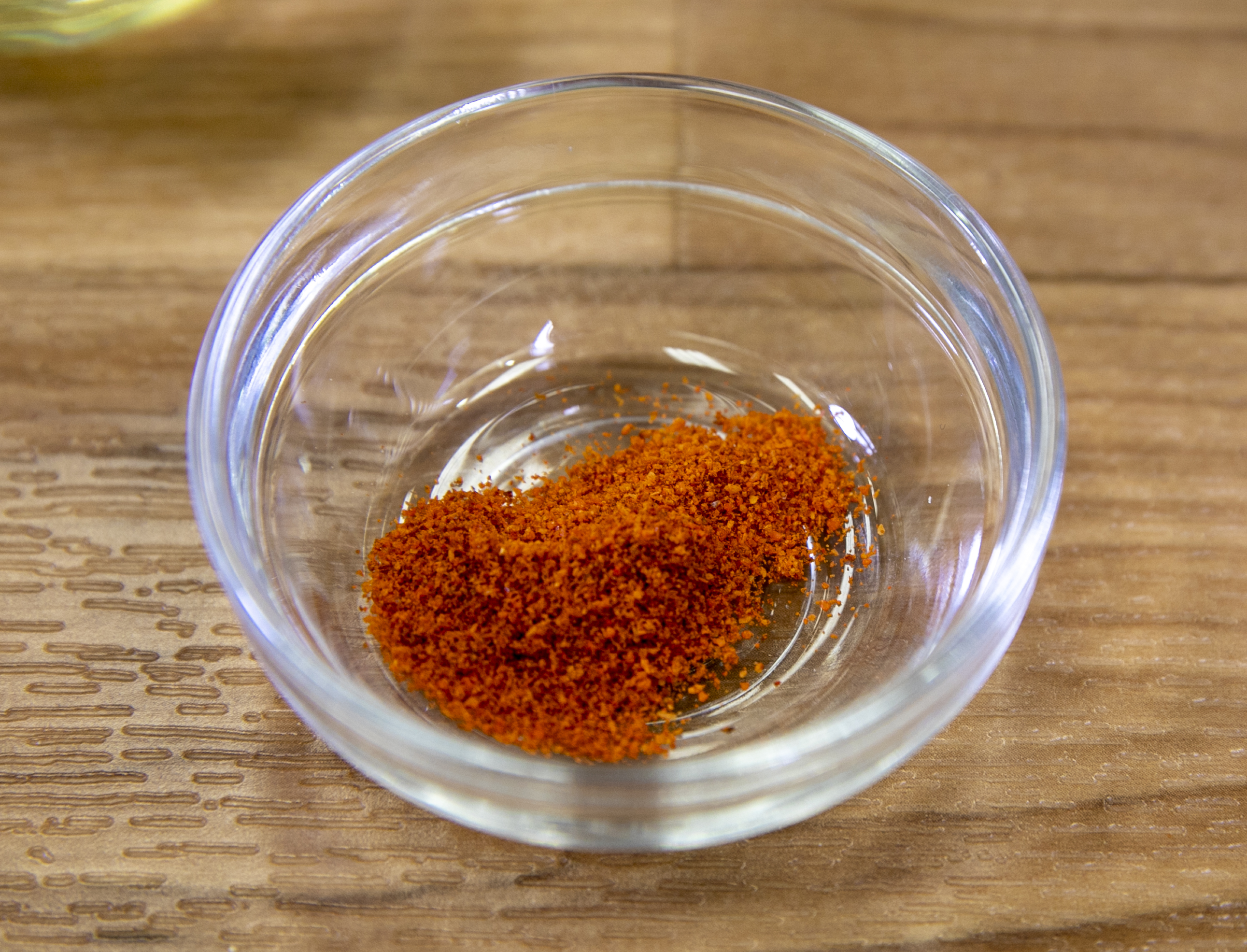
Powdered cayenne pepper

Cayenne powder may be a blend of different types of chili peppers. It is used in its fresh form, or as dried powder on seafood, all types of egg dishes (devilled eggs, omelettes, soufflés), meats and stews, casseroles, cheese dishes, hot sauces, and curries. In North America, the primary cultivar in crushed red pepper is cayenne. It is also used in some varieties of hot sauce in North America, such as Frank's RedHot, Texas Pete and Crystal.

== See also ==
- Chili powder
- List of Capsicum cultivars
- Sialagogue
