= Crystal Hot Sauce =

Brand of Louisiana hot sauce

External videos
- The Hunt for Red Hot Peppers, promotional video for Baumer Foods, discussing the process of manufacturing their hot sauce

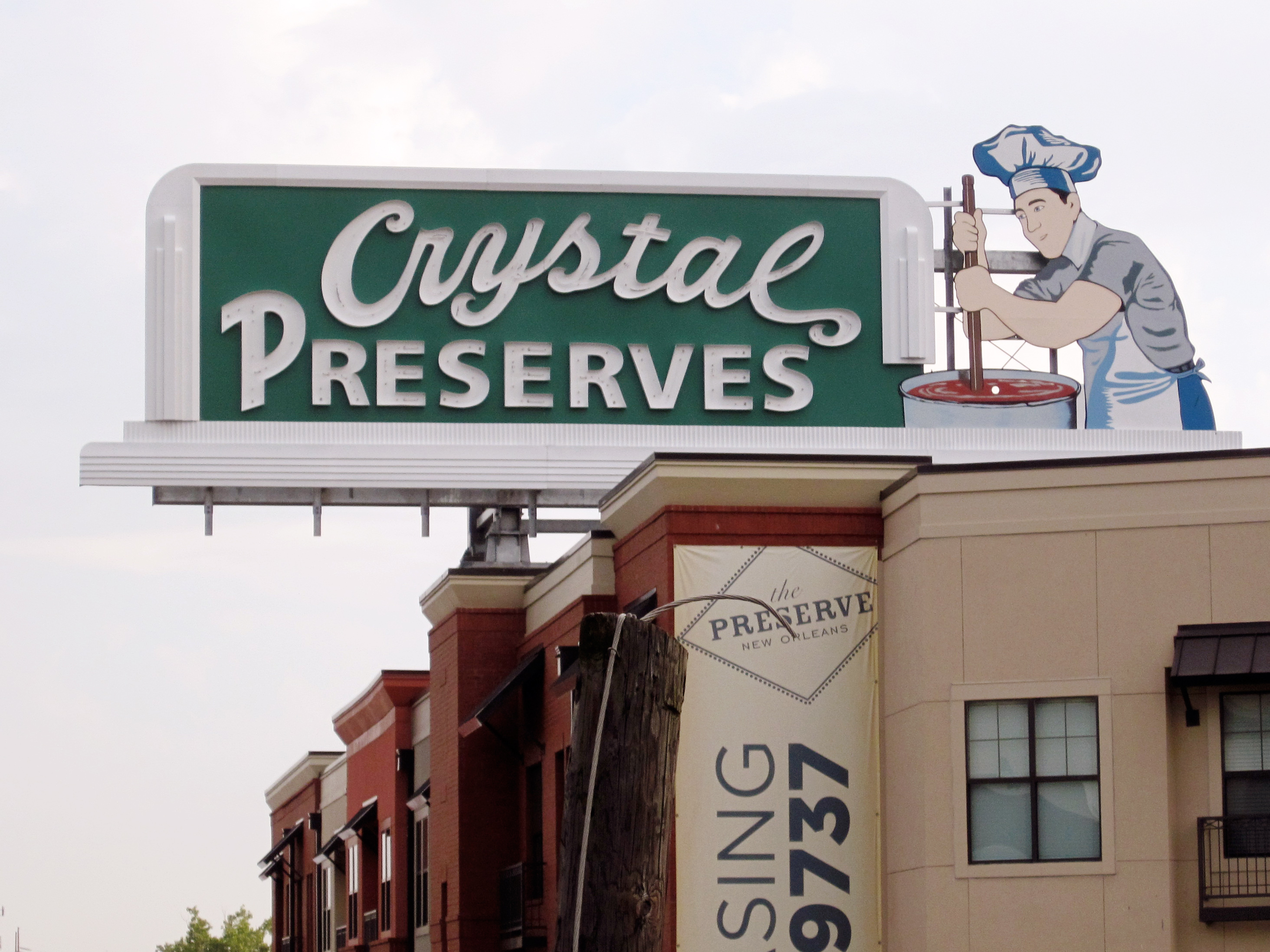
The post-Hurricane Katrina Crystal Preserves sign on Tulane Avenue, Mid-City New Orleans.

Crystal Hot Sauce is a brand of hot sauce produced by family-owned Baumer Foods since 1923. Made from aged red cayenne peppers, distilled vinegar, and salt, Crystal Hot Sauce is reddish orange with medium heat, and has been described as having "a more prominent dark chile flavor, and a slightly subdued vinegar profile" when compared to Tabasco Sauce. Annually, 3 million US gallons (11,000,000 L) of Crystal Hot Sauce are shipped to 75 countries.

== History ==
Originally based in New Orleans, Crystal was famous for its lighted sign featuring a chef stirring a pot of hot sauce with steam from the factory venting out through the pot. The sign was a New Orleans landmark on Tulane Avenue in Mid-City, visible from Interstate 10. The preserves advertised on the sign were found in U.S military rations during World War II, but are no longer produced.

Hurricane Katrina, which devastated the city in 2005, damaged much of Baumer Foods' New Orleans plant, including the sign. Following the storm, the company moved its plant to Reserve, in St. John the Baptist Parish, located up the Mississippi River from New Orleans. The iconic sign was replicated and placed atop a new apartment building, built on the same site as the old factory. As of April 2021, the company maintains its head office in Metairie, a suburb of New Orleans.

The brand enjoys popularity in Saudi Arabia, where it was introduced by petroleum workers from Louisiana.

== In popular culture ==
American chef David Chang has said that Crystal is his favorite hot sauce. Carolina Reaper breeder Ed Currie called Crystal "probably the best tasting of the table sauces."

== See also ==
- Cuisine of New Orleans
- Food production
- List of hot sauces
