= El Yucateco =

Mexican brand of habanero hot sauces

- Current owner: Salsas y Condimentos el Yucateco, SA de CV
- Country: Mérida, Yucatán
- Introduced: 1968
- Website: Official website

El Yucateco is a Mexican brand of hot sauces founded in 1968. Initially sold only at supermarkets in central Mexico, it began to be sold in the United States by the mid-1970s. Today it is sold around the world, with the largest customer bases in the United States and Canada. In 2016, there were seven varieties of El Yucateco hot sauce, ranging from 1,270 to 11,600 Scoville units. Labor disputes erupted at the company in 2018 and 2023; the latter dispute was mediated and resolved by the Confederación Revolucionaria de Obreros y Campesinos (CROC).

== History ==
Sources conflict as to whether El Yucateco Company, known in Spanish as Salsas y Condimentos el Yucateco, was founded by Priamo Gamboa Ojeda in 1968. It was originally a small family business founded in Mérida, Yucatán, devoted to the production of habanero pepper sauces based on recipes from the Gamboa family. The sauces were originally only sold at supermarkets in central Mexico; by the mid-1970s, El Yucateco's line of hot sauces were the first Mexican ones sold in the United States. In 2022, it was named the official hot sauce of the World Food Championships.

Today, El Yucateco sauces are sold in North America, Europe, Asia, and Oceania; the largest customer base is in the United States and Canada. They have a modern manufacturing facility, which contain their own habanero and annatto fields in Mexico. As of 2023, they had approximately 300 full-time and 500 on-call staff.

According to the Yucatán Times, El Yucateco sauces rank at the top of habanero sauces in national distribution and recognition in the United States. In 2016, CBS Detroit referred to El Yucateco as "the one hot sauce you can't live without".

=== Labor disputes ===
Workers at the El Yucateco plant in Kanasín protested in November 2018 against working conditions and abuse at the hands of management and the owners. According to their complaint, they said that the company forced staff to work on their days off. Those that did not comply were fired. Representatives for El Yucateco refused to comment on the matter, adding that the press had "no business in mediating a labor problem".

In 2023, El Yucateco denied staff their yearly share of profits, despite the growth of the business. Approximately 120 workers took over the plant to demand the restoration of their share. The company issued a statement explaining that profit sharing could not be had because no profits were gained in the preceding fiscal year. Reactions on social media were mostly negative and resulted in calls for a boycott. The Confederación Revolucionaria de Obreros y Campesinos mediated an agreement wherein workers were to receive their annual share of the profits in two payments.

== Line of hot sauces ==
As of August 2025, El Yucateco produces the following hot sauces at the corresponding Scoville heat units (SHU):

- Jalapeño: 1,500–1,900 SHU
- Chipotle: 1,900–2,300 SHU
- Caribbean habanero: 6,300–7,700 SHU
- Red habanero: 7,600–9,500 SHU
- Green habanero: 7,700–8,800 SHU
- Black Label Reserve Habanero: 4,500–5,500 SHU
- XXXtra Hot Habanero: 10,000–12,500 SHU
- Ghost Habanero: 14,165 SHU
- Grilled pineapple and habanero: 615 SHU
- Coffee habanero: 1,106 SHU
- Red marisquera: 1,398 SHU
- Black marisquera: 2,046 SHU
- Chiltepín habanero: 1,885 SHU
