= Thanasi Foods =

Manufacturer and distributor of packaged snack foods

THANASI Foods, LLC
- Company type: subsidiary
- Industry: Food processing, Food distribution
- Founded: 2004; 22 years ago
- Headquarters: Boulder, Colorado, USA
- Key people: Justin Havlick, President & CEO
- Products: Snack food
- Parent: Conagra Brands

Thanasi Foods is a manufacturer and distributor of packaged snack foods. Products distributed by Thanasi Foods are available in approximately 45,000 supermarkets, convenience stores, grocery stores, and drug stores in the United States and Canada.

== History ==
Thanasi was founded in 2004 by Justin "Duke" Havlick. Their brands include Duke's Smoked Shorty Sausages and Bigs Sunflower Seeds. The company was acquired by Conagra Brands in 2017.
