= Cholula Hot Sauce =

U.S. brand of hot sauce

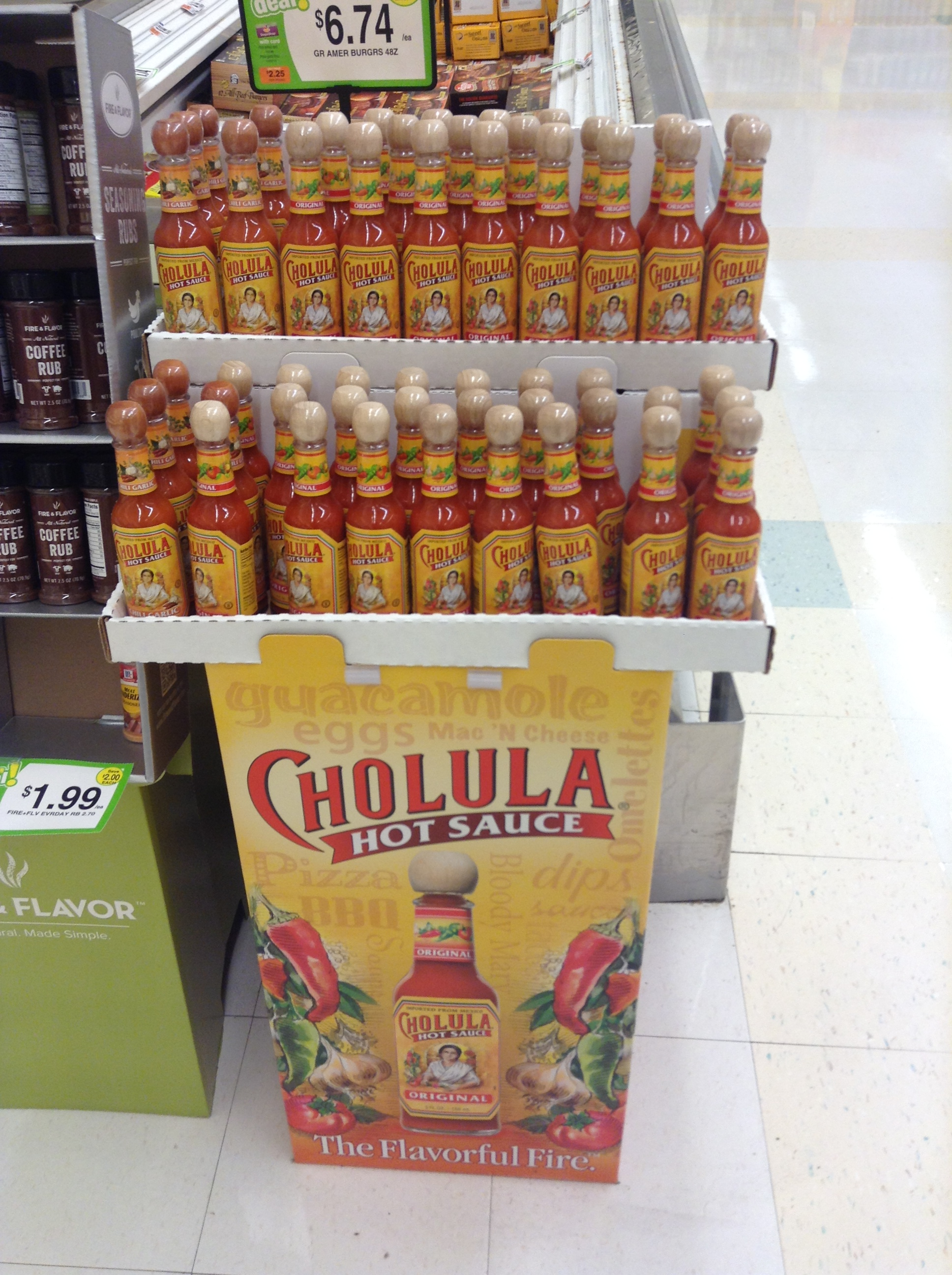
- Product type: Hot sauce
- Current owner: McCormick & Company
- Country: Mexico
- Website: Cholula.com
- Heat: Low
- Scoville scale: 2,000 SHU

Cholula Hot Sauce is a brand of chili-based hot sauce, based in Stamford, Connecticut, manufactured in Chapala, Jalisco, Mexico, by SANE, and licensed by McCormick. According to its manufacturers, Cholula hot sauce rates 1,000–2,000 on the Scoville scale.

The product is packaged in a glass bottle with a distinctive round wooden cap. Six varieties of Cholula are widely marketed in North America.

== Brand name ==
The hot sauce is named after the 2,500-year-old city of Cholula, Puebla, the oldest still-inhabited city in Mexico. The name "Cholula" is derived from the Nahuatl toponym Chollollan, meaning "the place of the retreat.”

== History ==
Cholula is licensed by Jose Cuervo, but was founded by the Harrison family, originally of Chapala, Jalisco. Prior to its acquisition, Cholula was produced for three generations in Chapala, and was used primarily as an ingredient in sangrita. Following expansion across the Mexican market, Cholula was first introduced to the United States in Austin, Texas, in 1989. During the 1990s, Cholula achieved distribution in supermarket chains throughout the American Southwest; it is currently available nationwide, as well as in many Canadian and British supermarkets.

Cholula has attempted a number of brand extensions. In 1999, a Cholula picante sauce was tested in Denver, Colorado, and quickly removed from the market. Cholula's line of dry seasonings, including Original, Chili Lime and Chili Roast Garlic, was discontinued in 2009.

On December 11, 2018, buyout firm L Catterton agreed to acquire Cholula.

In October 2019, The Cholula Food Company announced they would be moving their headquarters from New York City to Stamford, Connecticut.

The sale of the brand from L Catterton to McCormick & Company was announced on November 24, 2020, and completed six days later on November 30.

== Marketing ==
Six varieties of Cholula are widely marketed in North America, including Original, Chipotle, Chili Garlic, Chili Lime, Green Pepper, and Sweet Habanero. The product is most frequently retailed in 5-ounce glass bottles, although the original flavor is also available in 2-ounce and 12-ounce glass bottles, as well as 64-ounce plastic bottle, and 7-gram single-use condiment packets.

Cholula is marketed in the United States as The Flavorful Fire, sponsoring a variety of professional sporting venues and competitions. Cholula is served as the "Official Hot Sauce" in concessions at motorsports events including the Toyota Grand Prix of Long Beach and Coca-Cola 600, as well as at all events held at the iconic Indianapolis Motor Speedway. Cholula has sponsored collegiate football and tailgating promotions at the Rose Bowl, Sun Devil Stadium and Huskies Stadium. The brand is also well established as a wintersports sponsor, partnering with snowboarding competitions including the Cholula Triple Air Show.

In March 2007, Cholula began a joint promotion with national pizza chain Papa John's, offering complimentary hot sauce packets with every order.

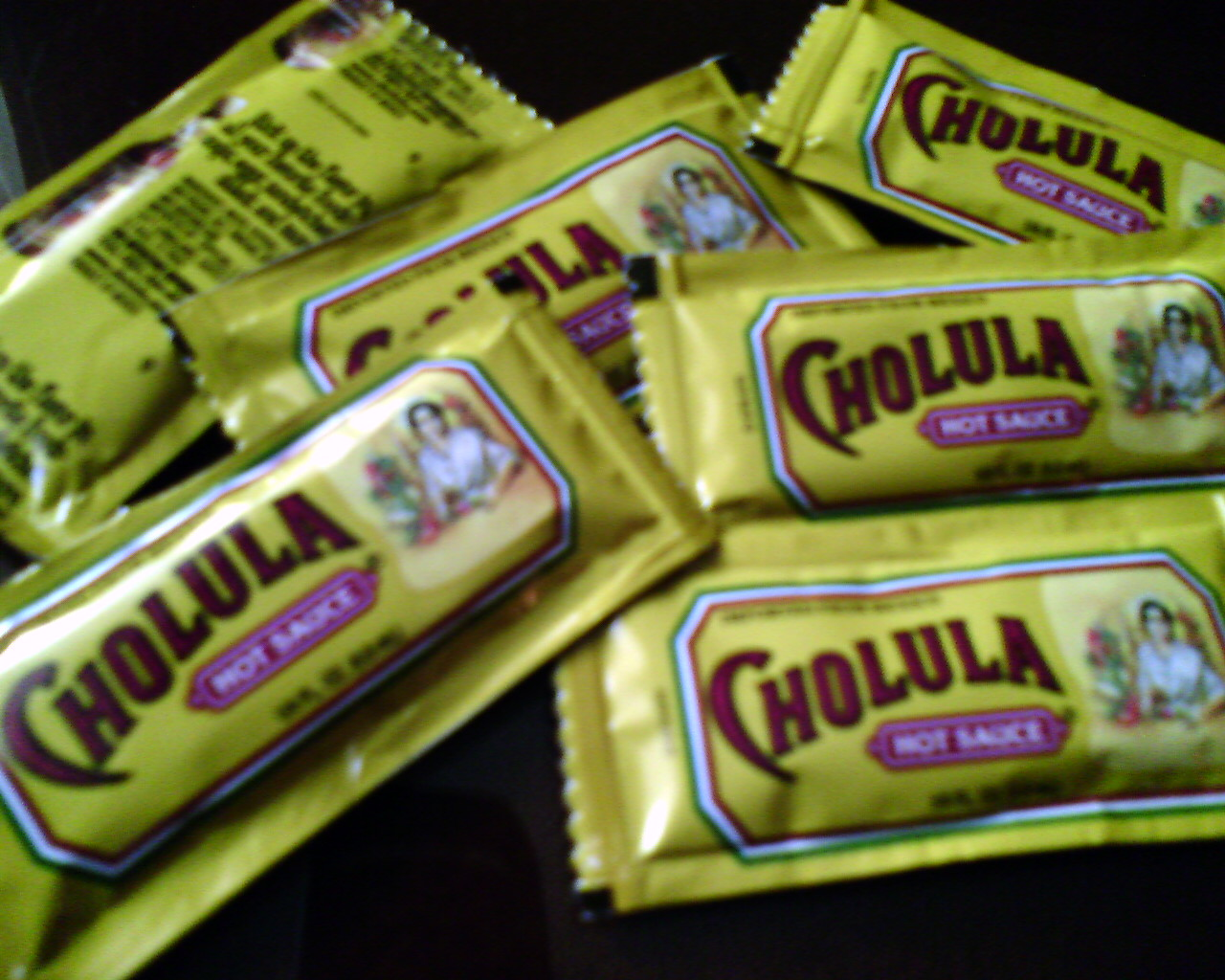
Cholula Hot Sauce packet

In June 2010, Cholula launched a print advertisement campaign designed by JWT Singapore under the slogan "Rescue Food."

Cholula is also one of the major sponsors for the Texas Rangers, New York Mets, Chicago Cubs, Cincinnati Reds, Washington Nationals, and Miami Marlins.

In 2018, Cholula launched a new advertising campaign under the slogan, "More than a hot sauce, inspiring your own mashups." Heavily promoted on YouTube, the promotion encourages buyers to blend Cholula with everyday condiments.

In response to restaurant closures due to the COVID-19 pandemic, the company released a 2-US-fluid-ounce (60 ml) bottle to boost sales. They also formed a deal with big fast-food chains for branded menu items.

== Ingredients ==
Original Cholula sauce blends piquin peppers, arbol peppers, and spices. The ingredient list on the product's packaging is: water, peppers (arbol and pequin), salt, vinegar, garlic powder, spices, and xanthan gum.

== Nutrition information ==
Nutrition facts at 5 ml (1 tsp): calories 0.0, protein 0.0 g, total carbohydrate 0.0 g, total fat 0.0 g, sodium 110 mg.

== See also ==
- Scoville heat scale
- List of hot sauces
