= Blair's Sauces and Snacks =

United States snack company

- Industry: Food products
- Founded: 1989
- Founder: Blair Lazar
- Headquarters: Middletown, New Jersey, U.S.
- Area served: United States
- Key people: Blair Lazar
- Products: Hot sauce Snacks
- Website: deathsauce.com

Blair's Sauces and Snacks is an American snack company founded in 1989, most famous for their Death Sauce line of hot sauces, known for their extreme range in Scoville heat ratings.

== History ==
Blair's Sauces and Snacks is a New Jersey–based food company specializing in hot sauces and spicy snacks. Blair has been featured on FoodTV Unwrapped, the History Channel, the Discovery Channel, QVC Japan, Rolling Stone magazine, The Wall Street Journal, the Daily News, the New York Post, and more.

Blair Lazar, founder of Blair's Sauces and Snacks, introduced Death Sauce in 1989 while bartending on the Jersey Shore. He began bottling and distributing this "Original Death Sauce" and a full line of hot sauces later followed (e.g., After Death, Mega Death, Sudden Death).

== Death Sauce ==
Blair's produces a variety of hot sauces under the brand name Death Sauce. The sauces range from the more modest heat of Sweet Death to the extreme heat of Ultra Death Sauce. The hotter sauces have pepper extract added for additional heat.

Name	Scoville Heat Units	Details
Crystal Death Sauce	2'000'000	A sauce made of pure capsaicin crystals, vinegar, and flavorings.
Instant Death Sauce	1'500'000	A sauce made of ghost chilies and reaper pods, cayenne chilies, serrano chilies, vinegar, lime, onion, garlic, and spices.
Ultra Death Sauce	1'100'000	Replacement for Jersey Death Sauce (Red Habanero Pods, Cayenne Chilies, White Vinegar, Natural Pepper Flavor (Contains Soybean Oil), Tomato Puree, Pirri-pirri Chilies, Lime Juice, Salt, & Spices) with added Naga Jolokia peppers.
Mega Death Sauce	550'000	A habanero sauce with cayenne, white vinegar, ancho chilies, chipotles, natural pepper flavor, molasses, guava nectar, ginger, salt, and spices.
Sudden Death Sauce	105'000	A habanero sauce with cayenne, white vinegar, honey, lime juice, ginseng, and spices.
Beyond Death Sauce	99'760	A habanero sauce with cayenne, vinegar, garlic, chipotle, lime juice, and spices.
After Death Sauce	50'000	Original Death Sauce with added pepper extract for extra heat. First sauce in the series to be labeled with a "warning". Notably hotter than previous sauces.
Pure Death Sauce	48'000	A sauce with naga jolokia and habanero peppers, vinegar, and Hawaiian red salt.
Salsa de la Muerte	45'000	Latin America variant of Original Death Sauce with more chipotle taste. Contains the same ingredients but with a higher concentration of habaneros.
Original Death Sauce	35'000	Blair's flagship product. A habanero sauce with vinegar, cayenne, garlic, chipotle, lime juice, cilantro, herbs and spices.
Golden Death Sauce	34'000	Released in 2010, at around the same heat level as Original Death Sauce, containing Scotch Bonnet Chilis, Fresh Onion Puree, Turmeric, Ground Mustard Seeds, Chipotle, and Habanero Powder
Jalapeño Death Sauce	20'000	A jalapeño hot sauce with tomatillos, garlic, onion, and tequila
Sweet Death Sauce	5'000	A mild habanero sauce with a vinegar base. Contains sweet tropical ingredients such as honey, mango, passion fruit, and sugarcane
Before Death Sauce	4'000	A mild habanero and habanada sauce with a vinegar base, carrots, chipotle, garlic, lime juice, and spices.

== Heat Collection ==
Blair's Q Heat Collection was a line of sauces used as marinades or dipping sauces. The Heat Sauces included: Habanero Mango, Jalapeño Tequila, Chipotle Slam, and Wasabi Green Tea. The Q Heat Line has been retired since 2018

== Reserve Collection ==
Blair's Reserve Collection includes a selection of award-winning, limited-edition, hand-crafted, signed and numbered bottles. Each Reserve edition commemorates a significant event or experience, beginning with the "A.M." series noted above. This series originated in the early 1990s when Lazar was bartending on the Jersey Shore. Patrons wanting to stay past the 2 am closing time were dared to try "Blair's Wings of Death", made with Blair's Original Death Sauce. Anyone who survived could stay as long as they wanted, thus, giving rise to the remaining items in the "A.M." series (e.g., 3am, 4am, 5am, and 6am Reserves). Other significant reserves include "Caldera," "Blair's Holiday Reserve," "Blair's Halloween Reserve," and "the Firecracker 500 Reserve." All but the 2am and 3am reserves are completely sold-out and are shown in Blair's vault. Collectors have been known to resell their reserve bottles for extremely high sums as per the Blair's website quoting "It has been reported to us that a bottle has recently (late 2004) sold for $5,450 (sold in a private sale to a buyer in Europe)."

=== 16 Million Reserve ===
The strength of Blair's hottest product, "Blair's 16 Million Reserve", is 16 million Scoville units (Tabasco, in comparison, is 2,500 to 5,000 Scoville units). It contains only capsaicin crystals, and is the hottest possible capsaicin-based sauce. Only 999 bottles of "Blair's 16 Million Reserve" were produced, each one signed and numbered by the firm's founder, and have all been sold. This reserve was certified by Guinness World Records as the hottest product available.
