= Pickapeppa Sauce =

Jamaican sauce

Pickapeppa Sauce bottle, with trademark bird and hot pepper logo

Pickapeppa Sauce, also known as Jamaican ketchup, is a brand-name Jamaican condiment, the main product of the Pickapeppa Company, founded in 1921. It is made in Shooters Hill, Jamaica, near Mandeville. The ingredients (in order on the product label) are cane vinegar, sugar, tomatoes, onions, raisins, sea salt, ginger, peppers, garlic, cloves, black pepper, thyme, mangoes, and orange peel, aged in oak barrels. The sauce is sweet, sour, and mildly spicy. The company makes four flavor variants of the original sauce: Hot Mango, Gingery Mango and Spicy Mango, plus Hot Sauce, an extra-hot Scotch bonnet pepper variety.

One traditional use of the sauce is to pour it over a block of cream cheese, to be spread on crackers.

A noted fan of Pickapeppa sauce is supermodel Naomi Campbell, who back in 2010 said she has a habit of carrying a bottle of Pickapeppa sauce in her purse wherever she goes.

== See also ==
- Jamaican cuisine
- Lizano sauce, a very similar sauce from Costa Rica
