= Eu'Vend =

Eu'Vend & coffeena
- Status: Active
- Genre: vending industry
- Venue: Cologne Trade Fair Center (Koelnmesse)
- Location: Cologne
- Country: Germany
- Inaugurated: 2003
- Attendance: 5,000 from 60 countries
- Organizer: Koelnmesse GmbH

Eu'Vend (official subtitle the international trade fair for the vending industry) is organised every two years by Cologne Trade Fair (Koelnmesse) at the fairground in Cologne - Germany. The conceptual sponsor of the fair is the German Vending Association (bdv), international partner is the European Vending Association, Brussels. The show is open for trade visitors only. Last Eu'Vend took place from 19.-21. September 2013. The next show will be from 24.-26. September 2015 again. Since 2011 Eu'Vend takes place in conjunction with coffeena (official subtitle "international coffee fair"). In 2013 the Specialty Coffee Association of Europe was the official education partner of coffeena for the first time.

== Product segments ==
The trade fair focuses on

- Vending machines (including hot drink vending machines, water cooler, snack vending machines, reverse vending machines, change machines)
- Filling products (coffee, tea und cold drinks, food, other filling products)
- vending machine cups
- Payment systems (cash dispenser, bill validator, cashless payment systems).
- Machine accessories/Components and spare parts in and for vending machines (for example water filter).
- Services for Operator (including Money counting and sorting machines).
- Kiosk Systems.
- Operator.

== Visitor target groups ==
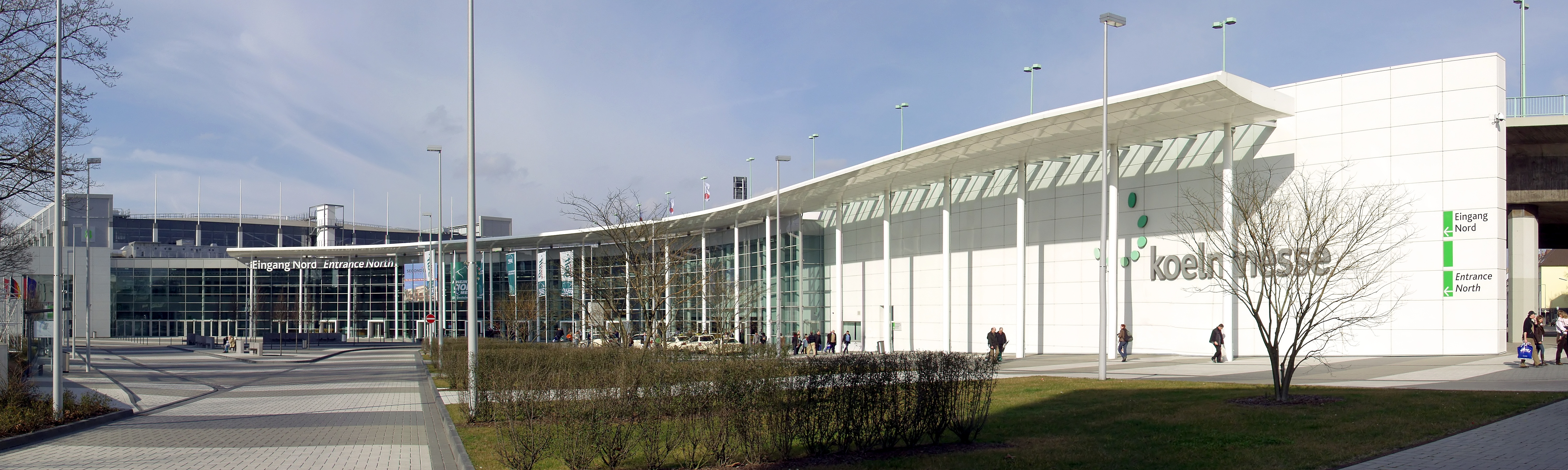
Koelnmesse North Entrance

Eu'Vend is addressed to Operators but also to people searching for employee or customer catering. Including

- Canteens, caterer
- Transport authorities, airlines
- Bakeries
- Schools, universities
- Hospitals, homes
- Hotels, youth hostels
- Tobacco product wholesale
- Casinos, gambling halls
- Doctors, tax consultants, lawyers

== History ==
Till 2001, the interested companies exhibited their products at Anuga Food Fair.

. Than the vending industry decided to launch an own platform. At the first Eu'Vend in 2003 there exhibited 178 companies from 13 countries. Within these three days there came 3.968 trade visitors from 49 countries to Cologne - Germany. In the following years Eu'Vend has grown further. The participants in Eu'Vend 2013 comprised 217 suppliers from 23 countries. These consisted of 126 exhibitors from Germany and 91 exhibitors (42%) from abroad. With approx. 5,000 visitors from 60 countries (34% from abroad) Eu'Vend & coffeena is deemed to be the most international vending and coffee fair.

== Innovation Award "Vending Star" ==
Koelnmesse has been granting the innovation award 'Vending Star' since 2007 in conjunction with the German Vending Association (BDV) at Eu'Vend & coffeena Night. The competition aims to optimize the application possibilities and services in the vending field and thus also acts as the instigator for the branch. The Members of the jury are: Helmut J. Düvel (CA Vending Krugmann GmbH & Co KG), Dr. Aris Kaschefi (BDV), Hans-Jürgen Krone (Lebensmittel Praxis Verlag), Ralf Lang (JAM Verlag), Asim Loncaric (Forum Zeitschriften), Michal Piotrowiak (Mastercup Vending, Polen), Matthias Schlüter (Koelnmesse), Eric Schwaab (Vending Report), Wolfgang Schwarzenberger (Dallmayr Automaten-Service serviPlus), Gerald Steger (café+co International, Österreich), Gerold Stüwer (Stüwer GmbH) und Jan Marck Vrijlandt (Selecta Group).
