= IDS =

IDS may refer to:

== Computing ==
- IBM Informix Dynamic Server, a relational database management system
- Ideographic Description Sequence, describing a Unihan character as a combination of other characters
- Integrated Data Store, one of the first database management systems from the 1960s
- Internet distribution system, a travel industry sales and marketing channel
- Intrusion detection system, detecting unwanted network access
- Iterative deepening search, a graph search algorithm performing depth-first search repeatedly with increasing depth limits

== Organizations ==
- Incomes Data Services, a British employment research organisation
- Industrial Dwellings Society, a British housing association
- Institute of Development Studies, a British international development organisation
- International Distribution Services, a legal name of Royal Mail since 3 October 2022
- Boeing Integrated Defense Systems, former name of a Boeing Defense, Space & Security
- Inspekteur der Sicherheitspolizei und des SD, Inspectors of the Security Police (Sipo} and the security service (SD), regional commanders, of Nazi Germany
- Integrated Defence Staff, an Indian military organisation
- Investors Diversified Services, former name of Ameriprise Financial
- Istrian Democratic Assembly, a Croatian political party
- Indiana Daily Student, a newspaper
- Raytheon Integrated Defense Systems
- International Dermoscopy Society, an international medical academic society
- Initiative for Democratic Socialism
- Institute for the German Language

== Science, technology and engineering ==
- Iduronate-2-sulfatase, a sulfatase enzyme associated with Hunter syndrome
- Index Catalogue of Visual Double Stars
- Integrated Deepwater System Program, a program to upgrade equipment of the US Coast Guard
- Tornado IDS (Interdictor/strike), a version of the Panavia Tornado combat aircraft
- IDS experiment (ISOLDE Decay Station), at the ISOLDE facility, CERN

== Other uses ==
- Iain Duncan Smith (born 1954), British politician, widely referred to by his initials
- IDS Center, building in Minneapolis, tallest in Minnesota, US
- Infant-directed speech or baby talk
- Information disclosure statement, to the US Patent and Trademark Office
- Integrated delivery system, a generic term for a health care network that provides a variety of care
- Income declaration scheme
- Intercontinental Dictionary Series, an online linguistic database
- International Dental Show, an annual trade fair in Cologne, Germany
- International District/Chinatown station, a light rail station in Seattle, Washington, US
- Île-des-Soeurs station, a light metro station in Montreal, Quebec, Canada

== See also ==
- International Docking System Standard (IDSS), an international standard for spacecraft docking
