= Railway Interiors Expo =

Railway industry show

Railway Interiors Expo

Railway Interiors Expo is an annual industry show held in November, in varying locations. Organised by UKIP Media & Events, the show has become a major event for the railway business since it was launched in 2004 and now visitors from over 60 countries attend.

Exhibitors at the Railway Interiors Expo offer a range of products and services related to train interiors, everything from seating and lighting to floor finishes and textiles, food service equipment, Wi-Fi, in-train entertainment systems.

Railway Interiors Expo is typically visited by industry individuals, creating an opportunity for exhibitors to find new business opportunities, globally and at the same time providing all participants with a networking opportunity.

In 2011, Railway Interiors Expo took place in the Koelnmesse trade fair and exhibition center located in Cologne, Germany. The expo ran from 15 to 17 November and included over 100 exhibitors.

In 2011 Railway Interiors Expo featured a free Design & Technology forum and an Awards for Innovation & Excellence ceremony.

The 2024 convention took place 24–25 November 2024 in Prague.
