= Nikonians =

Nikonians.org
- Website type: Photography
- Available in: English German French
- Owners: Nikonians GmbH, Germany
- Website: https://nikonians.org
- Commercial: Yes
- Launched: 1999
- Current status: active

Nikonians is an online community website dedicated to providing and sharing information among digital and film photographers, focusing but not limiting itself on those using Nikon digital and film cameras plus accessories.

Nikonians.org was founded by J. Ramón Palacios and Bo Stahlbrandt in late 1999 and opened to the public on 30 April 2000 with 30 members. Early after the site launch, it was awarded the Professional photography.com Impact Award and on July 14, 2002, won the Pro Site Award at Profotos.com.

The Nikonians community provides regular podcasts through three different English podcasts shows, and one in German on various photography and imaging themes since 2005. One of the most popular podcasts has been The Image Doctors by Rick Walker and Jason Odell. The show has been broadcast since 2006.

The community is active around the world, participating in exhibitions such as the former bi-annual photo and imaging exhibition Photokina in Cologne, Germany in 2006, 2008, and in 2010.

The site is independently maintained and is not affiliated with Nikon Corporation.

== Sources ==
- Nikonians: The Genesis http://www.nikonians.org/html/about/genesis.html
- Nikonians Awards: http://www.nikonians.org/html/about/awards/awards1.html
- Epson and Nikonians partnership http://www.ephotozine.com/article/Epson-and-Nikonians-partnership-10981
- HP contributes to online photography forum http://h41131.www4.hp.com/uk/en/press/HP_Joins_Nikonians.html
- HP partners with Nikon user Community http://www.letsgodigital.org/en/15197/nikon-user-community/
