= Marie Sharp's =

Condiment producing company

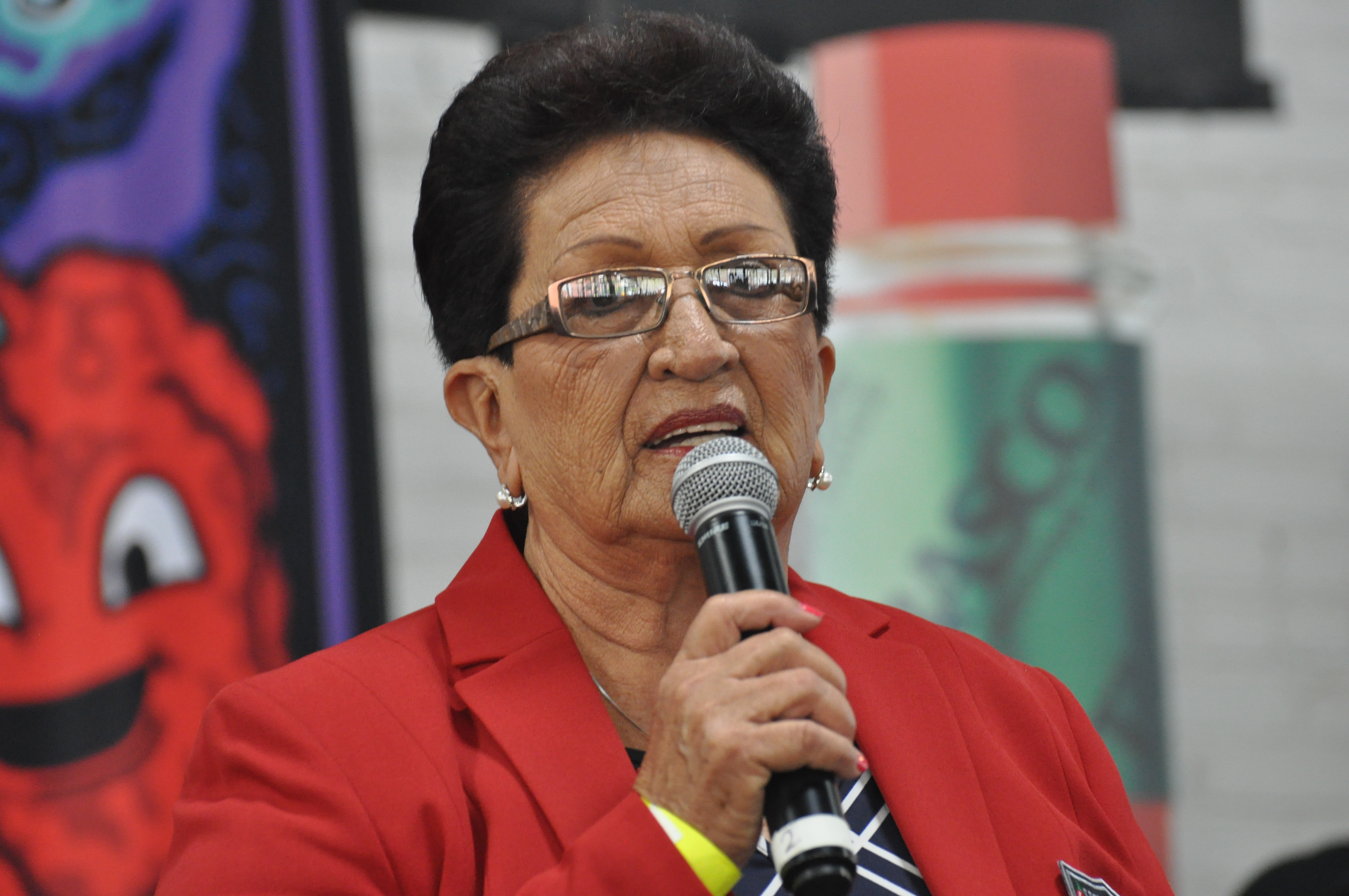
Marie Sharp receiving Hall of Fame Award at the 2016 NYC Hot Sauce Expo

Marie Sharp's Fine Foods Ltd., better known as Marie Sharp's, is a condiment and jam manufacturer based in the Stann Creek District of Belize, Central America. The women-owned company is named after its founder Marie Sharp.

The brand offers many varieties of sauces made from sustainably farmed, hand-picked, fresh fruit and vegetable bases such as carrots, orange/grapefruit pulp, nopales, tamarind, mango, and pineapple combined with crushed habaneros or other chiles.

== History ==
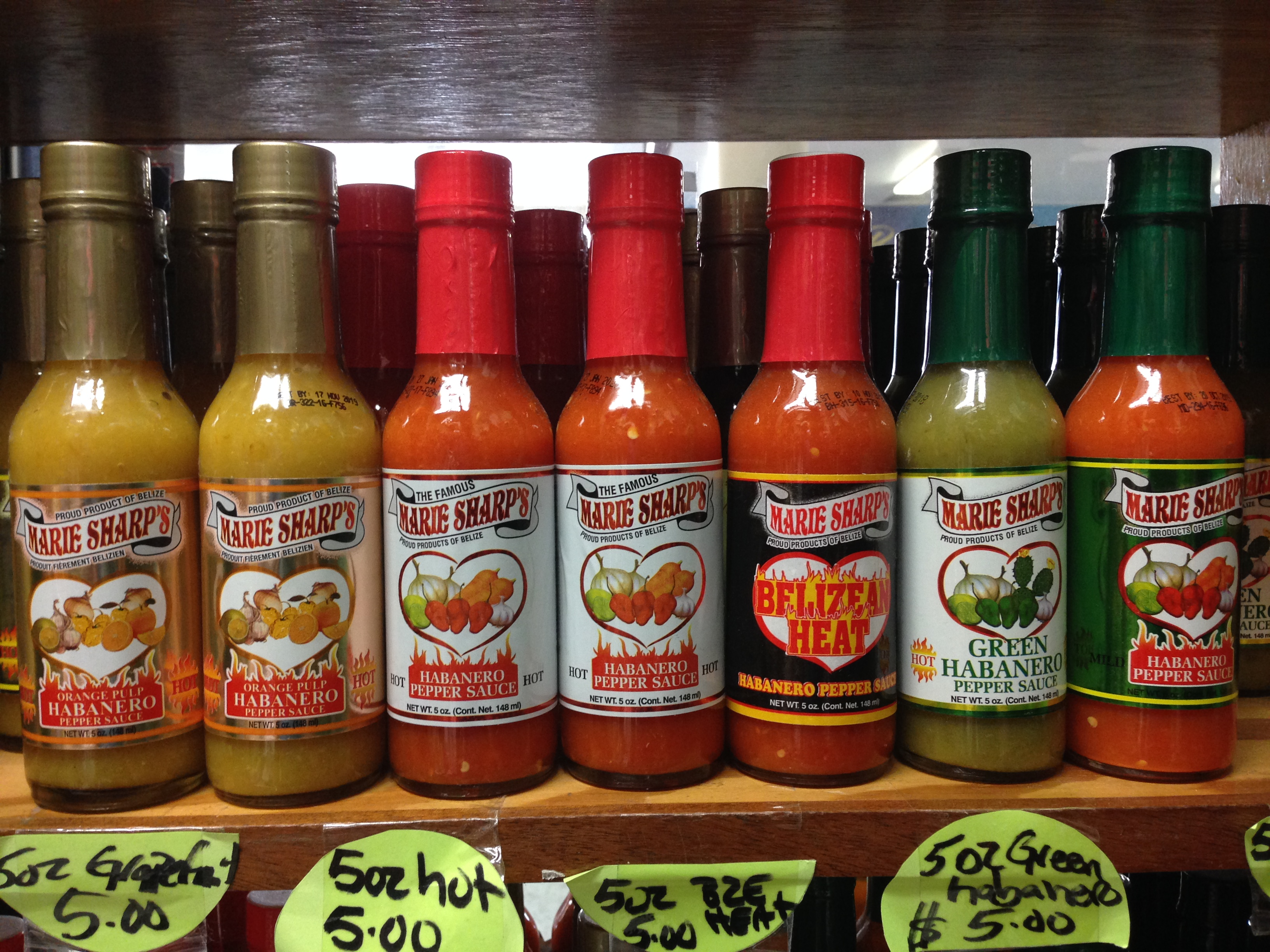
Several varieties of Marie Sharp's hot sauces

The company is privately owned by Marie Sharp, 81 years old in 2021, who began locally selling sauces on her 400-acre Melinda Estates farm outside Dangriga in 1981. In 1985 a factory was built to meet growing demand, now also serving as a popular tourist destination. The product was the first commercially successful agricultural product manufactured in and exported from Belize. It was originally sold under the name of "Melinda’s Hot Sauce", a reference to the Melinda family farm, which is located within the Melinda Reserve, at #1 Melinda Road. Marie's recipe was the first habanero pepper sauce to achieve national distribution in the United States, with the Reese Finer Foods distribution network in 1989. Once the market for the product had been established, the importer, Figueroa International Inc., who was marketing the sauce, trademarked the product name, effectively cutting Sharp out of her own business.

After a five-year struggle, Sharp gave up her original brand name, Melinda's Original Habanero Pepper sauce, in exchange for being released from her exclusive contract with the importer. She then re-branded the product under her own name. Distribution has since expanded from Belize to much of Central and North America, Europe, Asia and Australia.

In 2013, Sharp's entries at the Anuga Food Fair in Cologne made the prestigious "Taste13 Showcase" round and placed in the top three products at the world's largest food fair. In 2014 Marie Sharp's sales totaled $3.8 million. In 2016, the founder was inducted into the Hot Sauce Hall of Fame. The company also introduced their newest pepper sauce, "Smokin' Marie's", a smoked habanero sauce inspired by Alaskan smoked products. A combination of orange, grapefruit, guava and craboo-wood is used to smoke the habaneros.

On January 14, 2019, Gerry Sharp, Marie's husband and business partner later in life, died. He was a citrus pioneer in Belize and was instrumental in helping to shape the industry.

On January 27, 2019, Marie Sharp's oldest son Michael Alexander Williams Sr., 58, was murdered. Michael managed operations in Belize City for the company since the 1990s.

On February 14, 2019, in partnership with the US Embassy in Belize, Marie Sharp announced the launch of a new pineapple pepper sauce, "Pure Love", created to aid Combating Gender-Based Violence through Partnership Portions of the proceeds of the sale of “Pure Love” will go to Haven House–a non-profit domestic violence shelter–directly benefiting victims of gender-based violence and empowering them to take control and positively transform their lives. Jody Williams, grandson to Marie Sharp, presented Haven House with its latest contribution February 2, 2022. Dr. Sharmayne Saunders.

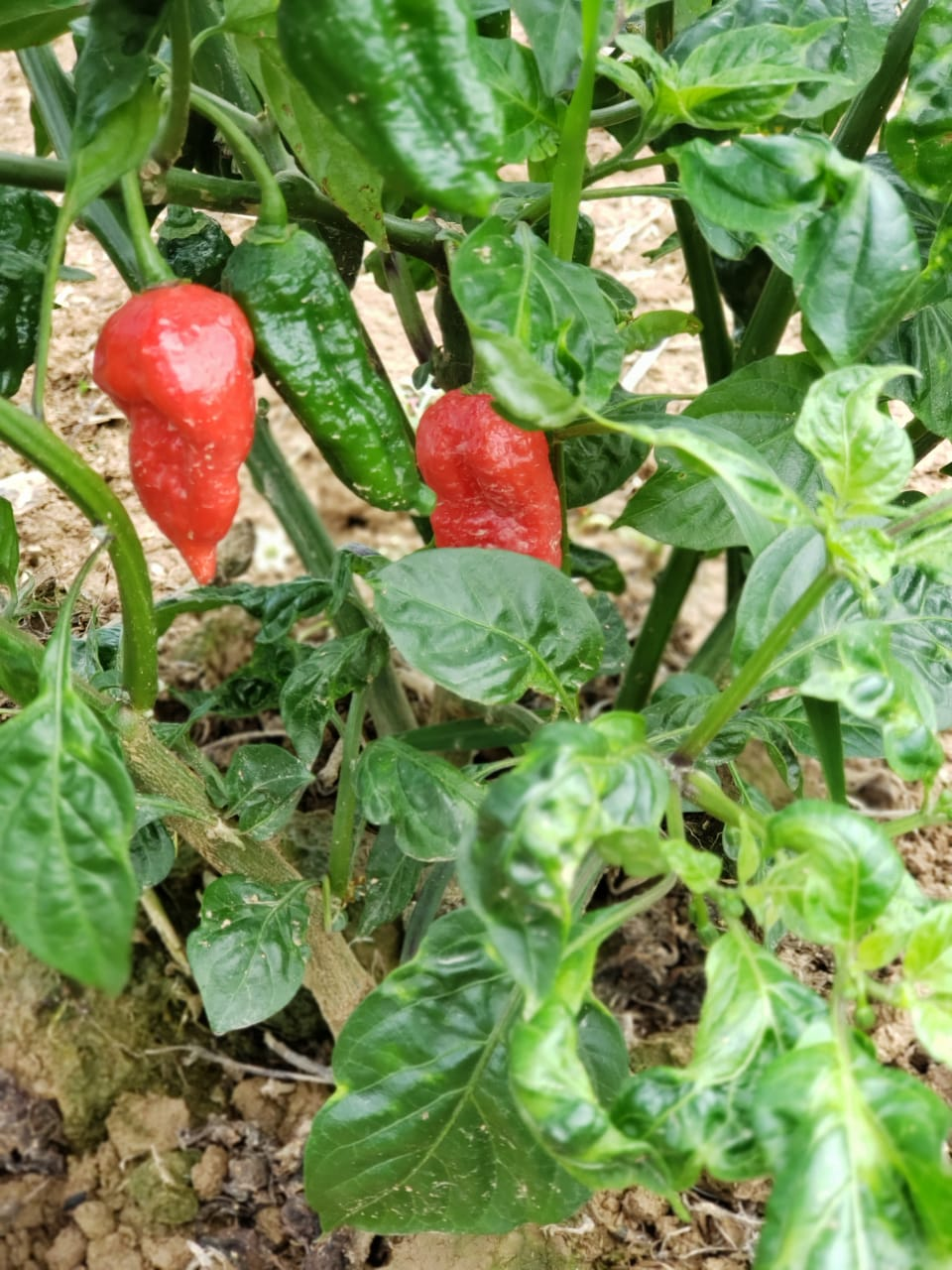
Marie Sharp's Belizean Red Hornet pepper plant - By Dion Gongora

== Jelly, jam, chutney and salsa ==
In 1982, finding that the farm had surplus fruit, Sharp visited local markets to get ideas of what products she and other farmers might be able to produce to increase their sales. Discovering that all the commercially produced jams, jellies and marmalades were manufactured from non-tropical fruits, she recognized an opportunity. Experimenting with recipes, Sharp developed a product with higher fruit content than the US Food and Drug Administration required and began marketing her products made without preservatives. Marie Sharp's produces many types of preserves which are marketed locally and internationally.

== See also ==
- List of hot sauces
- Scoville heat scale
