= Selecta =

Selecta may refer to:

== Business ==
- Selecta (dairy products), a Philippine brand of milk and ice cream products
- Selecta (company), a European vending services operator

== Music ==
- Selecta, or selector, slang term for a DJ
- "Selecta" (song), by Afrojack and Quintino, 2011
- "Selecta", a song by Chase & Status, 2023
- "Selecta", a song by Skrillex from Don't Get Too Close, 2023
