= Marie Sharp =

Belizean businesswoman (born 1940)

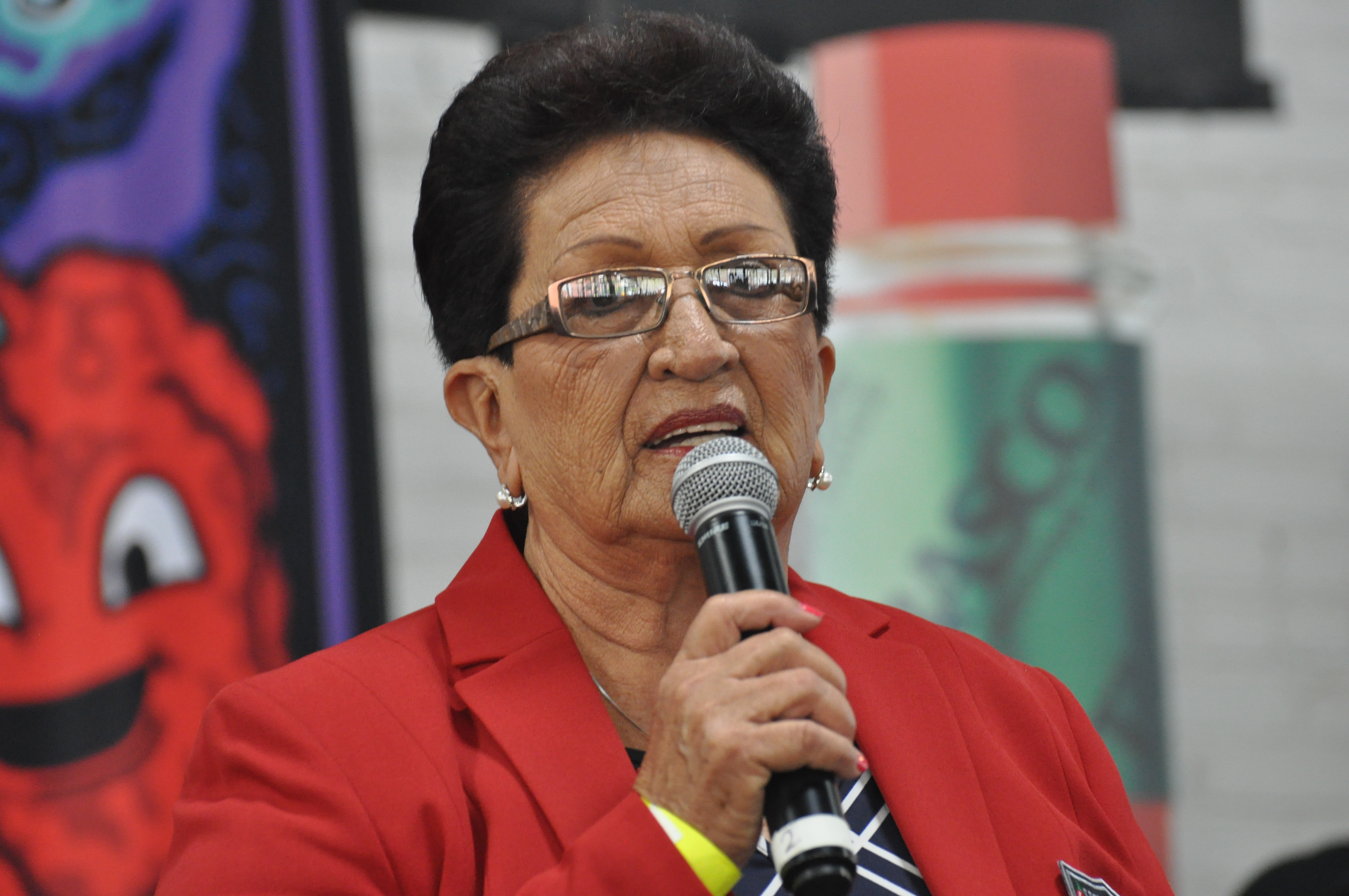
- 2016 Hall of Fame induction
- Born: 1940 (age 85–86); Belize City, British Honduras
- Occupations: educator, pepper sauce manufacturer
- Years active: 1981–present
- Known for: Marie Sharp's pepper sauces

Marie Sharp (born 1940) is a Belizean entrepreneur. She is recognized for her internationally known habanero-based pepper sauces. Prior to opening her own firm, she worked as a teacher and as an executive secretary for the Citrus Company of Belize. Since 1981, she has been producing pepper sauce and in 2016 was inducted into the Hot Sauce Hall of Fame. She is the founder and owner of Marie Sharp's Fine Foods Ltd.

== Early life ==
Marie Sharp was born in 1940 in Belize City in British Honduras. Her parents were originally from San Pedro Town on Ambergris Caye. They moved to Belize City shortly before her birth. The couple separated when she was eight years old. Sharp moved with her father to Dangriga, because of the schooling opportunities. In San Pedro, most schools taught only Spanish, but in Dangriga, she quickly learned the Garifuna language and attended school where English was taught. Graduating from high school in 1958, Sharp passed her Senior Cambridge Exams.

== Career ==
Sharp began her career as a teacher, working in various elementary schools for six years. For the ten years following, she served as an executive secretary of the Citrus Company of Belize. Her second husband was a farmer, and his family owned a 400-acre farm, Melinda Estates Limited. Sharp would spend spare time at the farm and plant various crops that grew well in the country. She originally planted chili peppers for a hot sauce manufacturer who took only a small amount of her habanero peppers. To prevent them from spoiling, Sharp grated the peppers and made barrels of pepper mash.

Working during the day for the Citrus Company, Sharp experimented with various vegetable combinations to make hot sauce and gave them away to friends. At their urging, she began to manufacture the sauce and in 1981, began Marie Sharp's Fine Foods. Her first product was called "Melinda's" after the farm owned by her husband's family. For ten years, she worked to build the brand, expanding into jams, jellies, and marmalades made with tropical fruit. In 1988, with the help of the Belize Chamber of Commerce and Industry and the United States Agency for International Development, she attended Clemson University, studying food packaging. Sharp found a distributor in the United States and began to market the product internationally. It was the first Belizean-made export product to gain wide acceptance and the only habanero-based sauce on the market at that time. In a marketing move, the distributor filed a trademark on the name. When Sharp found out in 1991 that the distributor had trademarked her product, she hired a lawyer. Because of the cost involved, travel constraints and the fact that as her sole distributor she could not work, Sharp eventually gave up the name to her sauce in exchange for a release of her contractual obligations, after a five-year struggle.

Though the situation required that she start over with new branding, Sharp re-branded with her own name that same year. In 2000, the Government of Belize facilitated her completing a course on food processing in Honduras at Zamorano Pan-American Agricultural School. Sharp also took a course on business management with the Belize Institute of Management and several courses on marketing and manufacturing practices in Jamaica and Barbados. Sharp was contacted by a distributor for a major superstore and began exporting her products to U.S. markets in 2003, though she refused to sign an exclusive distributorship arrangement. The arrangement brought her products, which were already available in Central America to all North American markets. Soon after, she was approved to do business in Japan and her Japanese distributor contracted to take the product to other parts of Asia, Europe and Oceania.

Her products known as Marie Sharp's have been widely recognized. She received the Gold prize in the 20th Food and Beverage Competition of Düsseldorf, Germany. In 2013, her entries at the Anuga Food Fair in Cologne made the prestigious "Taste13 Showcase" round and Sharp's sauce placed in the top three. In 2014, she was honored by Belize's Special Envoy for Women and Children as a woman trailblazer. Sharp was inducted into the Hot Sauce Hall of Fame in 2016. In June 2017 Mrs. Sharp's Products won twice golden awards in 2 out of 3 categories at the German Chili Award in Hanover/Germany.

== Personal life ==
Sharp has been married twice. Her first husband, with whom she had three sons, died of cancer. She remarried, and her second husband brought his seven children, two girls and five boys, into the family. Three sons work in various aspects of Marie Sharp's Fine Foods.
