= U-Key =

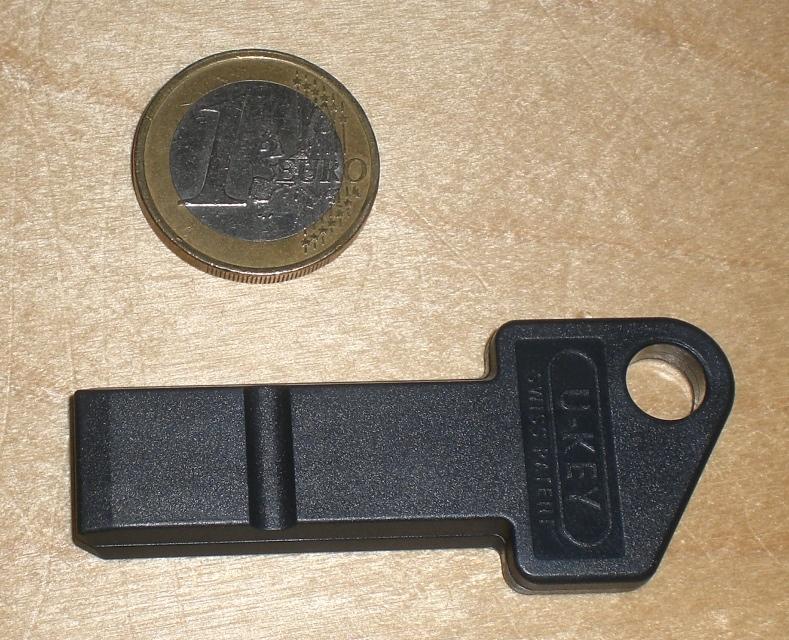

A U-Key is an implementation of the MIFARE RFID chip, encased in a plastic key style housing. It is used as a prepayment system on vending machines and for some self-service diving air compressors in Switzerland, and they will be most likely made by Selecta (company).
