= Dmexco =

Trade fair for digital marketing

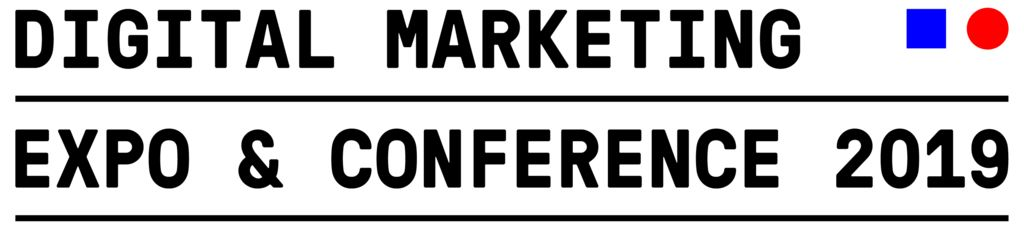
Logo DMEXCO 2019

The DMEXCO (pronounced D-M-EXCO / Digital Marketing Expo & Conference) is an annual trade fair for digital marketing and advertising. The largest congress trade fair for the digital industry in Europe has been held in Cologne, Germany since 2009. From 2000 to 2008, DMEXCO's predecessor was the online-marketing-duesseldorf (OMD) trade fair.

The trade fair covers marketing methods such as online marketing, targeting, tracking, digital content (video and audio advertising), social media marketing, mobile marketing, performance-based marketing, affiliate marketing, e-mail marketing, search engine marketing and In-game advertising as well as topics like virtual and augmented reality, connectivity and the Internet of things.

Marketers, agencies (media agencies, media planning agencies, advertising agencies, full-service agencies) and technology service providers have the opportunity to present their products and services at the fair.

DMEXCO is organized by Koelnmesse, the conceptual and technical sponsors are the Bundesverband Digitale Wirtschaft (BVDW) e. V. and the Online-Vermarkterkreis (OVK). Further official partners are AGOF (Arbeitsgemeinschaft Online Forschung), Art Directors Club Germany, Fachgruppe Online-Mediaagenturen (FOMA), GWA (Gesamtverband Kommunikationsagenturen), IAB Europe (Interactive Advertising Bureau) and OWM (Organisation Werbungtreibende im Markenverband).

Since 2009 DMEXCO has taken place annually.

== dmexco 2015 ==
The 7th edition of dmexco took place on 16 and 17 September 2015. In total, 881 exhibitors and more than 43,000 trade visitors attended the congress, which was held in 2015 under the motto "Bridging Worlds". A total of 500 speakers appeared, including Sir Martin Sorrell (chief executive officer WPP), Thomas Ebeling (chief executive officer ProSiebenSat.1 Media) and Nicola Mendelsohn (Vice President EMEA Facebook).

== dmexco 2016 ==
The 8th edition of dmexco took place on 14 and 15 September 2016. Under the motto "Digital is everything – not every thing is digital", the dmexco attracted more than 50,700 visitors to Cologne, where 1,013 exhibitors from the global digital economy presented themselves. The conference featured 570 speakers on 15 stages, including Dana Anderson (chief marketing officer Mondelez), Jack Dorsey (chief executive officer Twitter) and Tim Armstrong (chief executive officer AOL).

== dmexco 2017 ==
The 9th edition of the fair took place on 13 and 14 September 2017 with the motto "Lightening the Age of Transformation". In contrast to previous years, there were no more free tickets for the dmexco 2017. As a result, the number of trade visitors fell to 40,700, while the number of exhibitors rose slightly to 1,100. The dmexco Conference featured 570 speakers with more than 250 hours of programming on 18 stages, including Sheryl Sandberg (chief operating officer Facebook), Jack Dorsey (chief executive officer Twitter), Allen Blue (Co-Founder LinkedIn), Stewart Copeland (founder and drummer of the band The Police), Thomas Reiter (former astronaut and ESA Coordinator International Agencies and Advisor to the General Director) and David Meza (Chief Knowledge Architect NASA).

In November 2017 Koelnmesse extended the contract for the DMEXCO with the BVDW on a long-term basis, but terminated the contractual relationship with the consulting company KDME. The new DMEXCO management team was appointed in January 2018.

== DMEXCO 2018 ==
The 10th edition of the trade fair took place on 12 and 13 September 2018 at the Koelnmesse exhibition grounds. The motto was Take C.A.R.E. (Curiosity-Action-Responsibility-Experience). As part of its new strategy, DMEXCO has had a changed corporate identity and a new corporate design since 11 June, including a new website. The number of trade visitors to DMEXCO 2018 rose slightly to 41,000, the number of exhibitors was 1,000. More than 550 speakers were attending the event. Speakers at the conference were among others Dorothee Bär (CSU, Minister of State for Digitalization), Nico Rosberg (World Champion Formula 1), Philipp Schindler (Chief Business Officer Google), Timotheus Höttges (CEO Telekom), Wanli Min (Chief Machine Intelligence Scientist Alibaba Cloud).

== DMEXCO 2019 ==
On 11 and 12 September 2019 the 11th edition of the event took place again on the Koelnmesse exhibition grounds. Around 1.000 exhibitors and around 40.000 visitors took part in Europe's most important event for the digital economy in Cologne this year.

With the motto "Trust In You", the central role of trust for the further development of the digital economy was discussed, because trust is essential in many aspects: Companies need the trust of users to offer products and services successfully. At the same time, they have to trust their employees to master the digital challenges. Users, on the other hand, must be able to rely on the digital economy to treat their data with respect and responsibility. All in all, the entire digital industry needs the confidence of the society that digitalization brings more advantages than disadvantages for people.

The number of speakers rose to 600 in 2019, 35 percent of them female. Among the speakers were Stephanie Buscemi (chief marketing officer Salesforce), Jimmy Wales (founder of Wikipedia), Ryan Leslie (chief executive officer SuperPhone), Sir Martin Sorrell (founder of WPP), Sabina Jeschke (board member Digitalization and Technology Deutsche Bahn), Brennan Jacoby (founder of Philosophy at Work), Roger McNamee (founder of Elevation Partners, former facebook investor), Piera Gelardi (founder of Refinery29) and Charlotte Roche (presenter, producer, actor, radio play speaker and author).

In 2019 the new DMEXCO App, which not only enabled electronic ticketing, but could also be used for networking by visitors and exhibitors throughout the year, was in use for the first time.

To partially compensate the CO_{2} pollution caused by the arrival of visitors, DMEXCO started the reforestation project DMEXCO Forest together with the Social Business Treedom. In Kenya, trees will be planted to store around one million kilograms of CO_{2} in the future. Another sponsor of the campaign was the SaaS company Productsup.

== DMEXCO 2020 ==
DMEXCO 2020, originally planned as a physical and digital event, was held in completely digital form, as DMEXCO @home, on September 23 and 24 under the motto "Attitude matters". A total of almost 900 speakers, 20,000 participants and 260 exhibitors took part in DMEXCO @home

== DMEXCO 2021 ==
DMEXCO 2021 took place for the second time under the title DMEXCO @home and under the motto "Setting new priorities" on 7 and 8 September 2021 as a purely digital event. In total, more than 600 speakers, 20,600 participants and 240 exhibitors took part in DMEXCO @home.

== DMEXCO 2023 ==
DMEXCO 2023 took place under the motto "Empowering Digital Creativity" on 20 and 21 September 2023. In total, more than 800 speakers, 40,000 participants and 650 exhibitors took part in DMEXCO 2024.
