= Koelnmesse =

Exhibition centre in Cologne, Germany

Koelnmesse Exhibition Centre

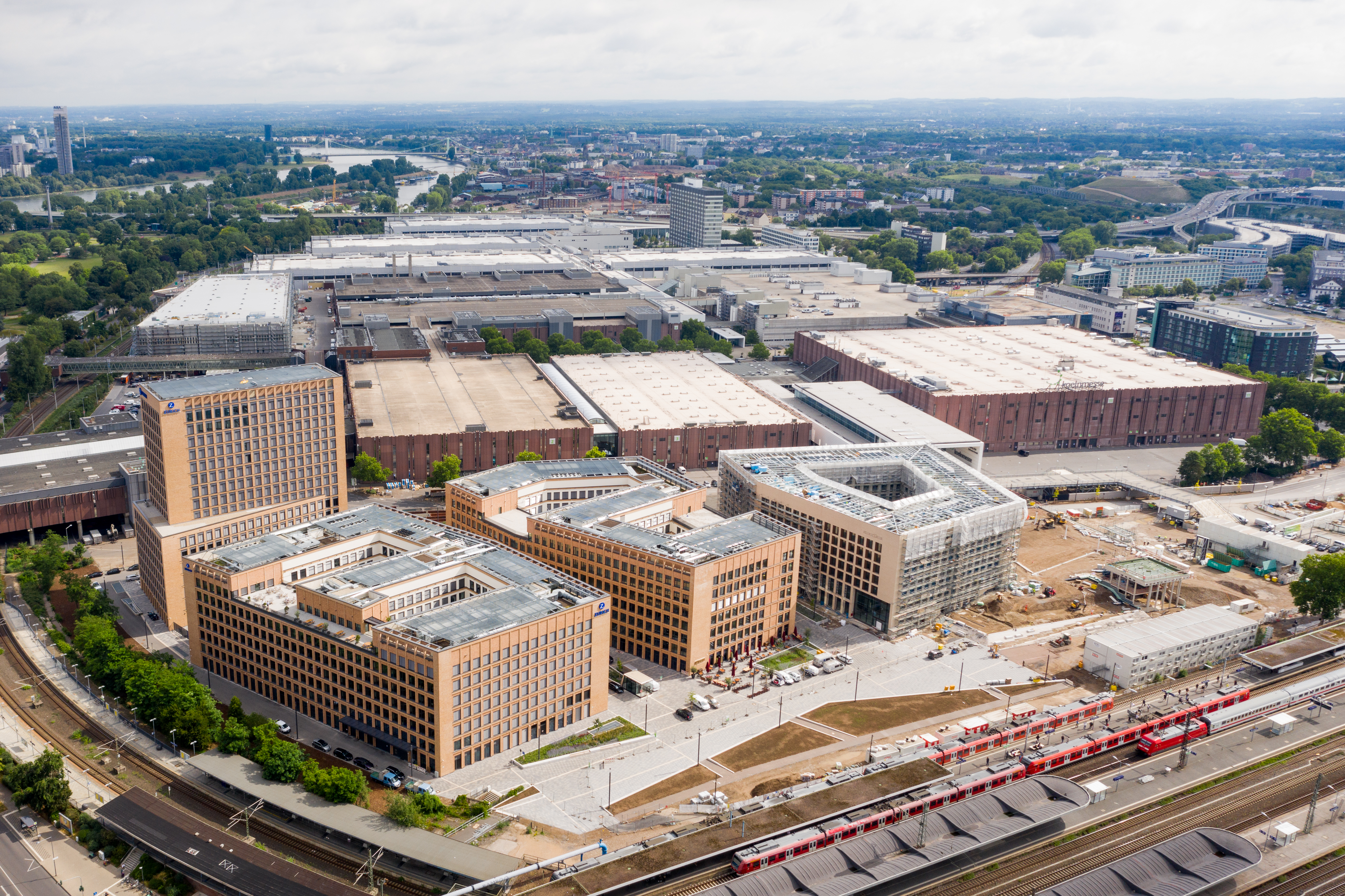
- Koelnmesse - aerial view
- Interactive map of Koelnmesse Exhibition Centre
- Address: Messeplatz 1, 50679, Cologne, Germany
- Coordinates: 50.946401°N 6.9812304°E
- Owner: Koelnmesse GmbH
- Operator: Koelnmesse GmbH
- Public transit: S-Bahn, U-Bahn, Train, Taxi, Plane

Construction
- Opened: 1924

Website
- www.koelnmesse.com

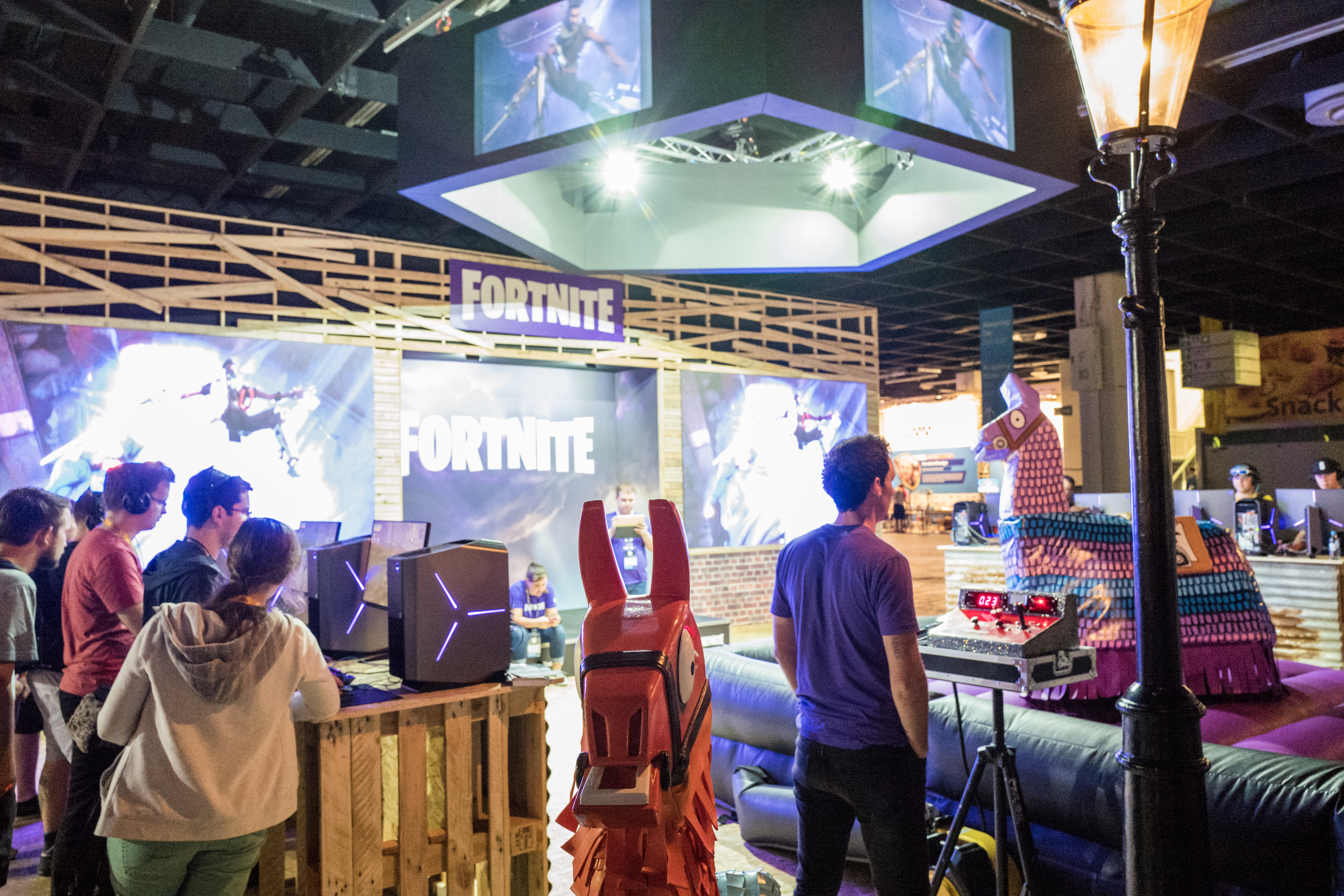
Inside Koelnmesse at Gamescom 2017

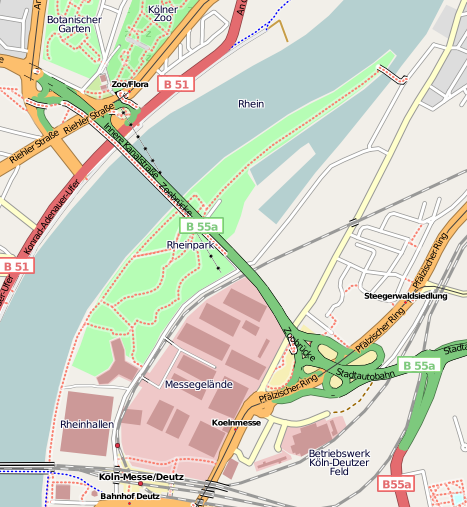
Map of the Cologne trade fair grounds (marked Messegelände)

Koelnmesse GmbH (Cologne Trade Fair) is an international trade fair and exhibition center located in Cologne, North Rhine-Westphalia, Germany. With around 80 trade fairs and over 2,000 conferences annually, Koelnmesse is one of the country's largest trade fair organisers and with 284,000 m^{2} exhibition floor area the third largest by area.

The Cologne Trade Fair ground was founded in 1922. Until 2005, the trade fair was based in the historic Rheinhallen, and since then moved into new premises next to them. The old Fair Tower Cologne (Messeturm Köln) is a landmark building from 1928, and used to feature a tower restaurant on the top floor.

Since 2018, the fair has been undergoing the greatest renovation works in its history. They are expected to last until 2030 and cost €600 million. Two thirds of that amount will be spent renovating the seven southern halls, dating from the 1970s.

== Trade fairs ==
The following trade fairs, among others, are held in Cologne:

- Anuga, the world's most important food and beverage trade fair
- Anuga FoodTec, the supplier fair for the food and drink industry
- Art Cologne
- Dmexco, the leading international exposition and conference for the digital industry
- EuVend, the international trade fair for the vending industry
- Gamescom, most important trade fair for interactive games and entertainment in Europe
- Imm Cologne, leading trade fair for the furniture sector
- Intermot, international motorcycle, scooter and bicycle fair
- International Dental Show (IDS), trade fair for dental medicine and dental technology
- Internationale Süßwarenmesse (ISM), world's largest confectionery trade fair
- Photokina, the world's leading fair for photography and imaging

== Location ==
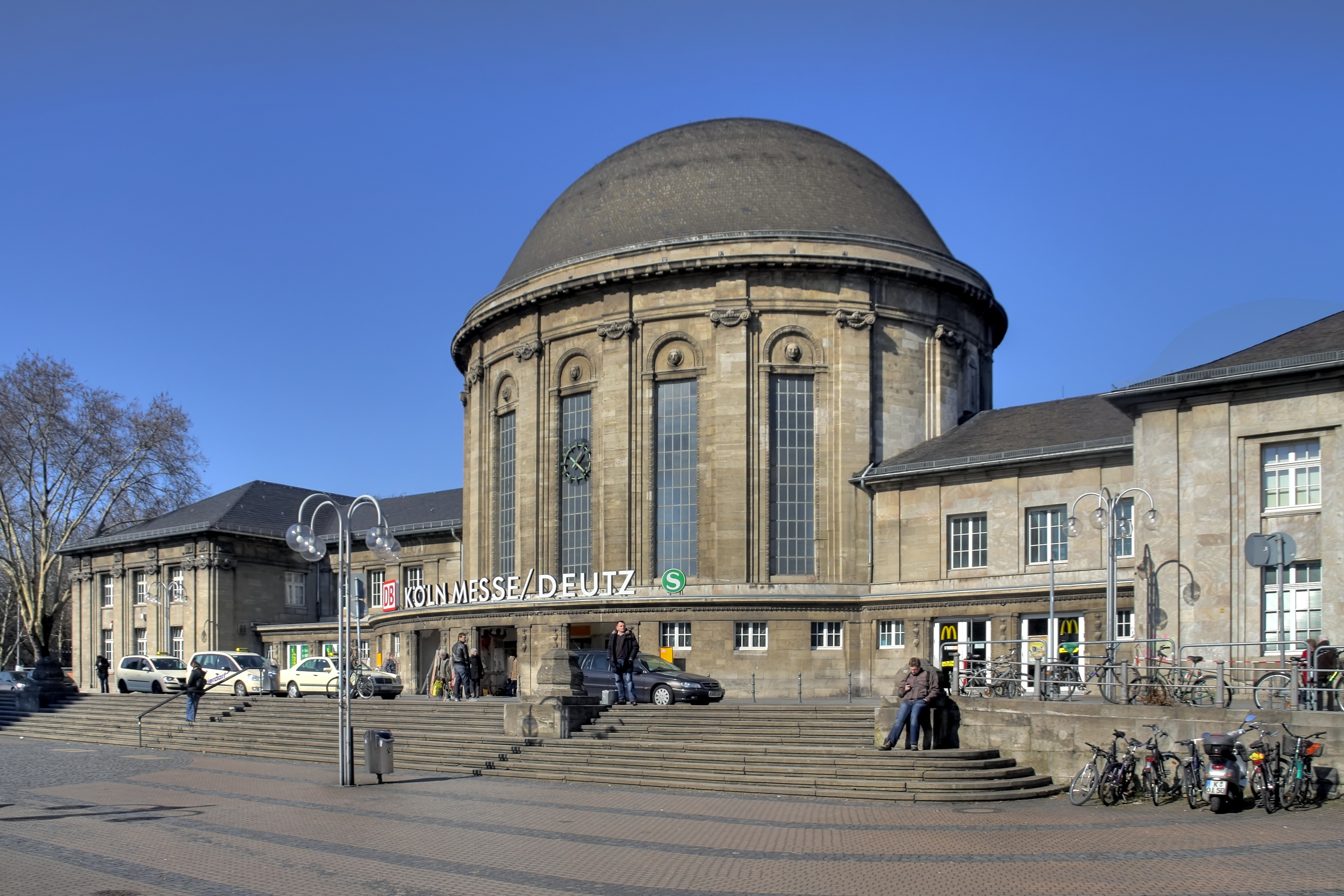
Köln Messe/Deutz station

The trade fair grounds lie in Cologne's right-Rhenish district of Deutz, directly adjacent to Köln Messe/Deutz station to the south. Among others, the station has ICE connections by Deutsche Bahn to Köln Hbf and Cologne/Bonn Airport. West of the trade fair grounds lies the Rheinpark, a 40 hectare large park on the River Rhine, and Tanzbrunnen, an open-air theater.

Apart from the Köln Messe/Deutz station to the south, the Cologne trade fair center is also served by the Cologne Stadtbahn Koelnmesse station to the East.

== Subsidiaries ==
KölnKongress GmbH	Cologne	Germany	www.koelnkongress.de
Koelnmesse Ausstellungen GmbH	Cologne	Germany	www.koelnmesse.com
Koelnmesse Pte. Ltd.	Singapore	Singapore	www.koelnmesse.com.sg
Koelnmesse Inc.	Chicago	United States	www.koelnmessenafta.com
Koelnmesse Co. Ltd.	Beijing	China	www.koelnmesse.cn
Koelnmesse Ltd.	Hong Kong	Hong Kong	www.koelnmesse.cn
Koelnmesse S.r.l.	Milan	Italy	www.koelnmesse.it
Koelnmesse Co. Ltd.	Tokyo	Japan	www.koelnmesse.jp
Koelnmesse YA Tradefair Pvt. Ltd.	Mumbai	India	www.koelnmesse-india.com
Koelnmesse Co., Ltd.	Bangkok	Thailand	www.koelnmesse.com
Koelnmesse Organização de Feiras Ltda.	Rio de Janeiro	Brazil	www.koelnmesse.com

== Image gallery ==
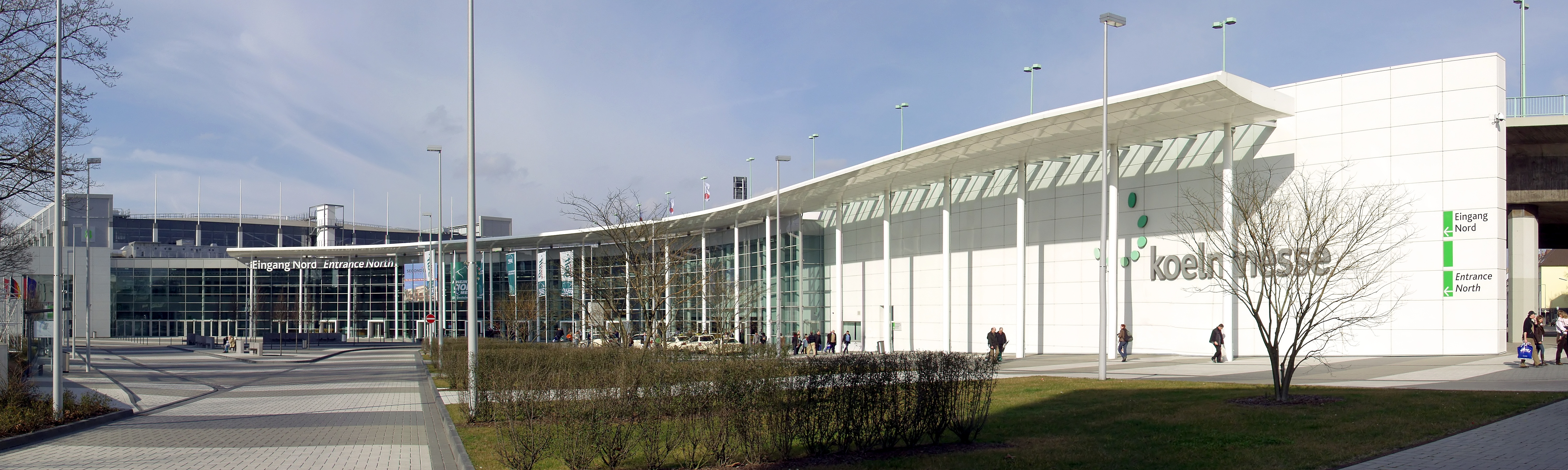
The North Entrance

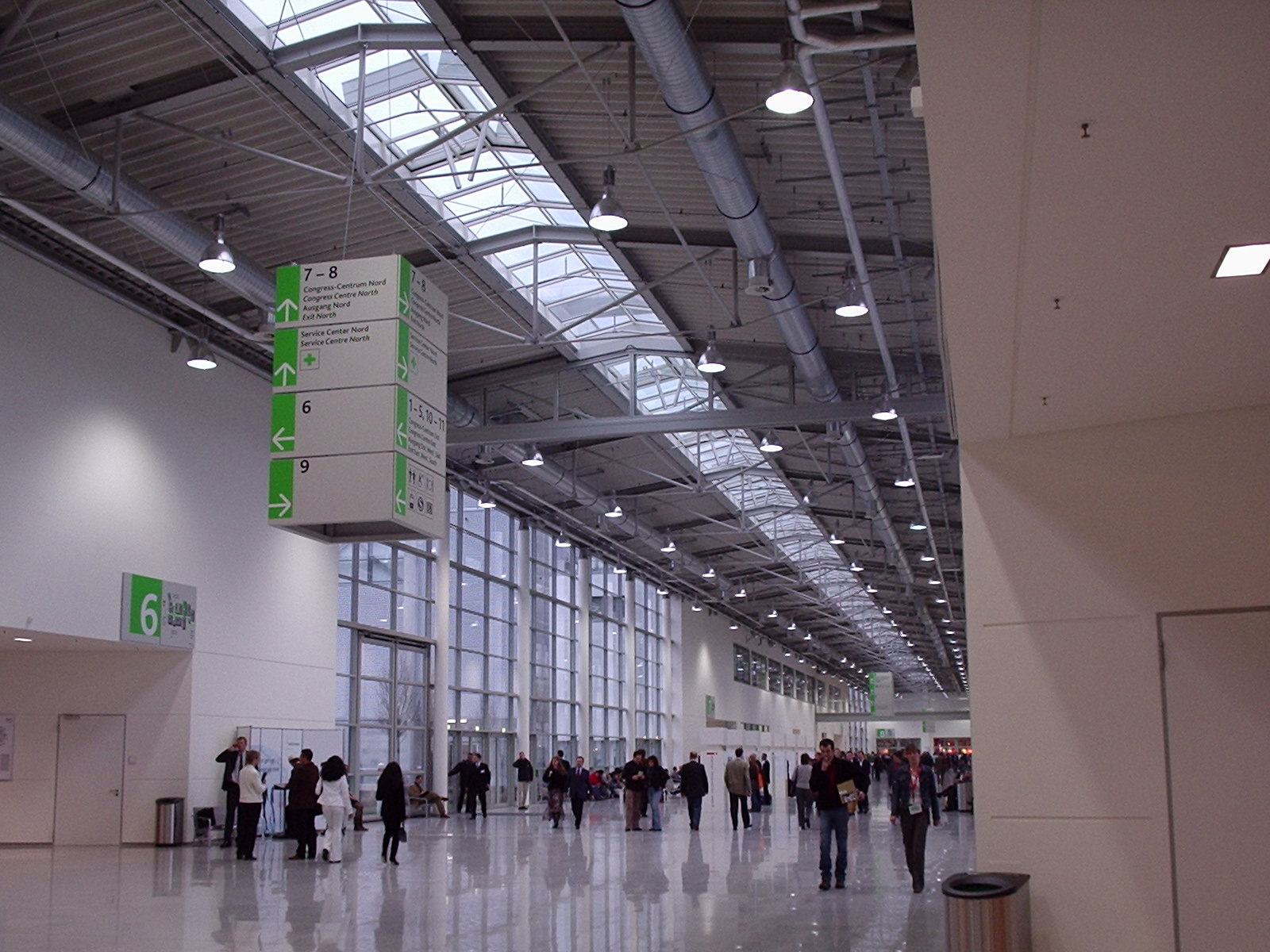
One of the fair aisles

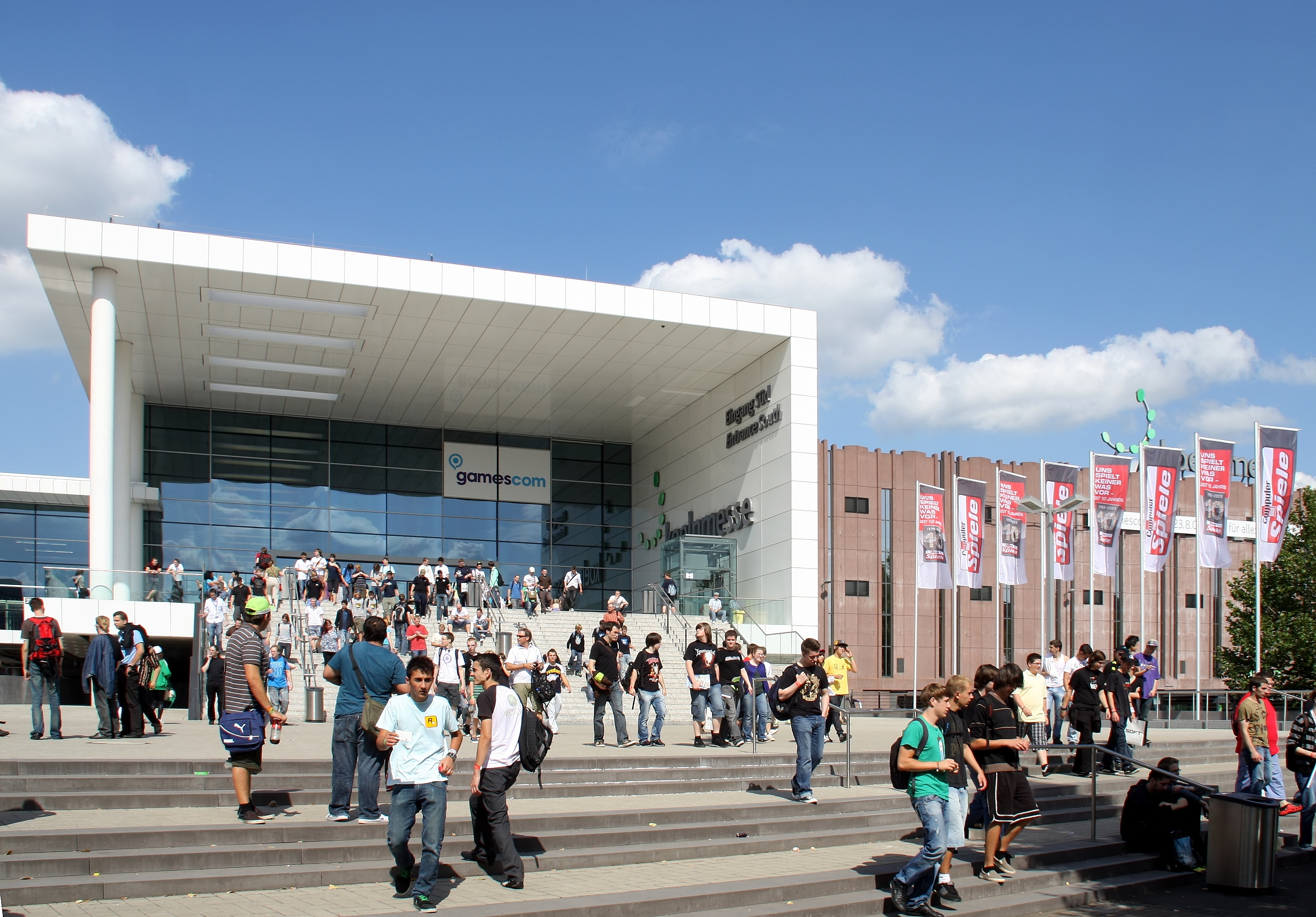
The South Entrance
