= Photokina =

Photographic and imaging trade fair

Coordinates: 50.9479°N 6.9837°E

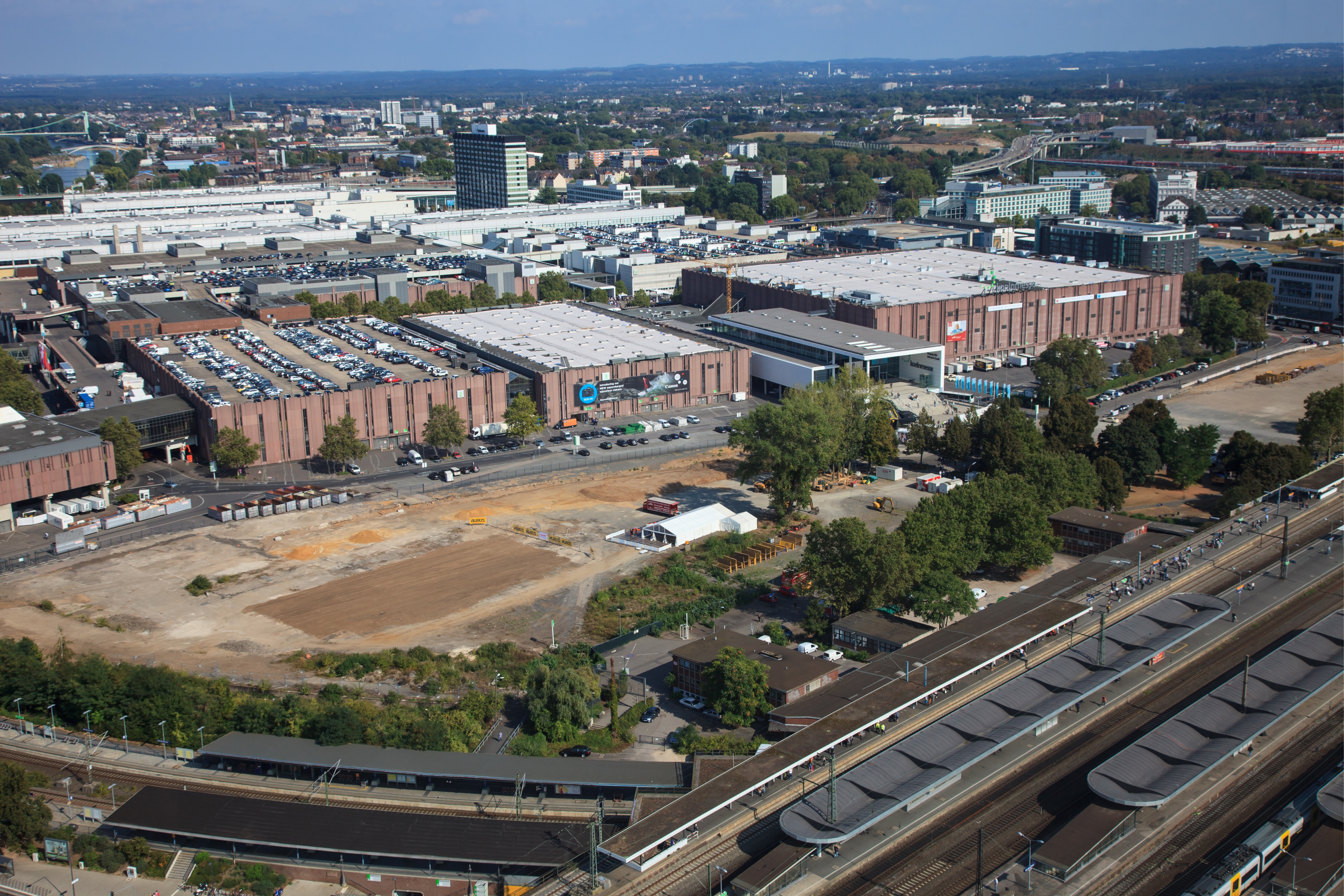
Photokina event space in 2016

Photokina logo

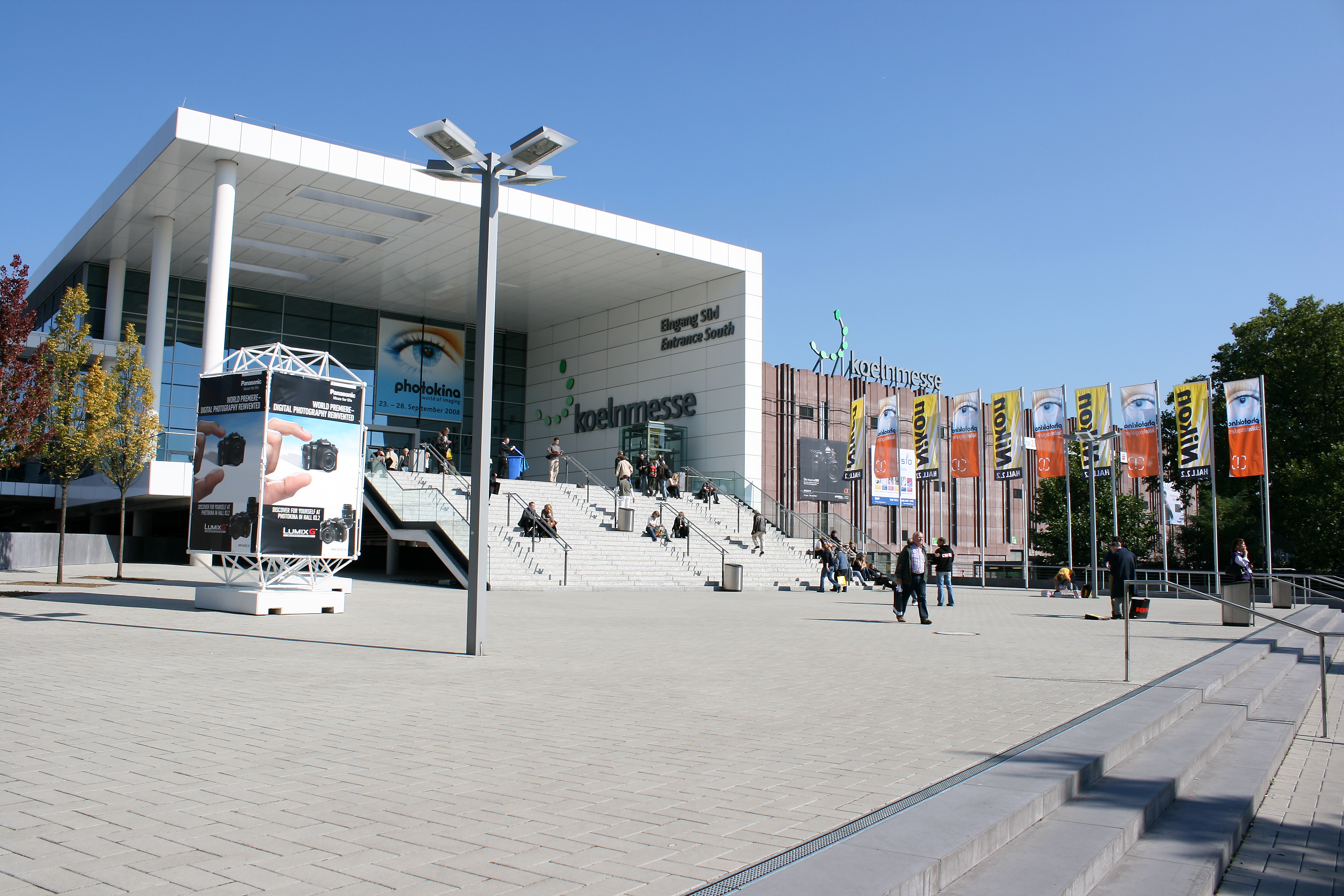
South Entrance of the Cologne Trade Fair during Photokina 2008

Photokina is a trade fair held in Europe for the photographic and imaging industries. It is the world's largest such trade fair. The first Photokina was held in Cologne, Germany, in 1950, and since 1966 it has been held biennially in September at the Koelnmesse Trade Fair and Exhibition Centre in Deutz. The final Photokina under the then-current biennial cycle took place in 2018. Initially, the promoters planned to start a new annual cycle in 2019, with future shows to be held in May, but they later decided not to begin the new annual cycle until 2020. The worldwide outbreak of the COVID-19 pandemic and its effect on the imaging industry made Koelnmesse decide to cancel both Photokina 2020 and Photokina 2021. Many photographic and imaging companies introduce and showcase state of the art imaging products at Photokina.

== Similar trade shows ==
The show has two main competitors, both of which are annual shows held in different parts of the world. The CP+ show in Yokohama, Japan, originally the Japan Camera Show, has been held since the early 1960s. In the U.S., the main photography show is PMA@CES, which since 2012 has coincided with the Consumer Electronics Show in Las Vegas.

== History ==
The first Photokina was held in 1950 at the initiative of Bruno Uhl. U.S. President Dwight D. Eisenhower sent a greeting telegram marking the opening of Photokina in 1956.

- The 2008 show featured 1,579 exhibitors from 46 countries and had over 169,000 visitors from 161 countries.
- The 2010 Photokina took place from 21 to 26 September. It featured 1,251 suppliers from 45 countries and had over 180,000 visitors from 160 countries.
- The number of visitors increased to 185,000 from 166 countries for Photokina 2012, which took place from 18 to 23 September 2012 and hosted 1,158 suppliers from 41 countries. The 2014 attendance remained roughly constant, at an estimated 185,000. The 2016 Photokina had about 191,000 visitors.
- Photokina 2018 was held in Cologne, Germany from 26 to 29 September 2018. The dates were originally announced as 25–30 September, but the format was shortened as a part of the change to an annual event.
- Photokina 2020, the first in the new annual cycle of events, was planned held once again in Cologne, 27–30 May 2020, but was cancelled because of the outbreak of the Coronavirus disease 2019 as well as Photokina 2021.
- On November 27, 2020, Koelnmesse announced that Photokina was suspended until further notice, due to changing market conditions.
