= Messeturm Köln =

Building in Cologne, Germany

Coordinates: 50°56′40″N 6°58′11″E

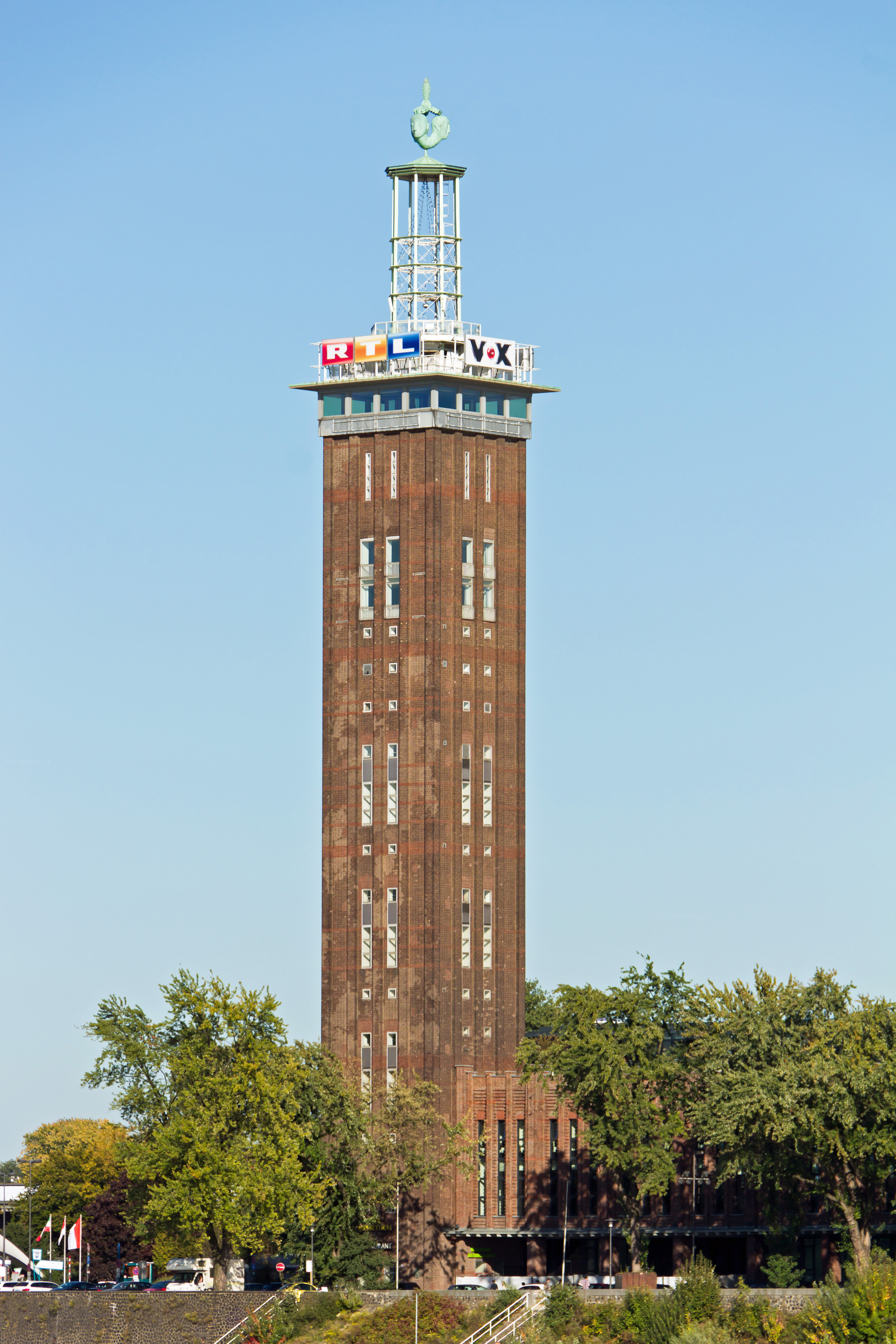
Messeturm, seen from the left river side

The Messeturm Köln (German for Fair Tower Cologne) is a highrise building which is 80 meters high, in Cologne, Germany. It is crowned by the sculpture Hermes-Gesichter (German for Faces of Hermes) by Hans Wissel, professor for sculpture and plastic arts at the Kölner Werkschulen. The tower's top floor featured a tower restaurant (now closed).

The tower got its name because it was erected besides the fair halls of Cologne. Faced with brick the finish of the buildings looks similar, but they were not built together. The halls opened with the first fair on May 11, 1924. The building of the tower was started in 1927 and it opened with a fair on May 12, 1928. Tower and halls were built on the banks of river Rhine in the borough Köln-Deutz just opposite Cologne Cathedral.
