= International Dental Show =

Dental industry trade fair in Cologne

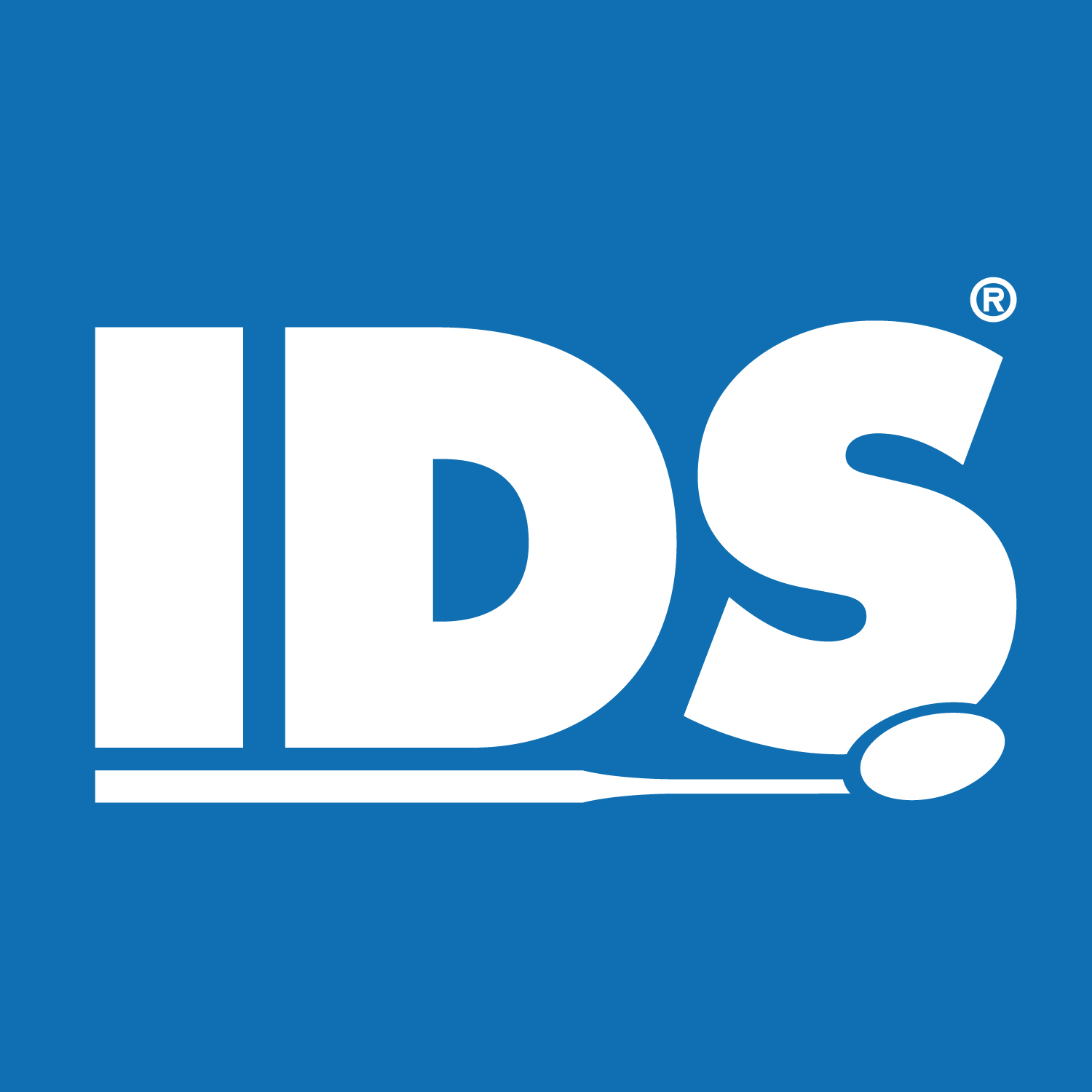
IDS logo

The International Dental Show (IDS) in a trade fair in Cologne, Germany, for dental medicine and dental technology. It is the world's largest trade fair for the dental industry.

== History ==
The IDS is the world's largest trade fair for dental medicine and dental technology. The trade fair is organized by the GFDI (Gesellschaft zur Förderung der Dental-Industrie mbH), the commercial enterprise of the Association of German Dental Manufacturers (VDDI) and staged by Koelnmesse GmbH.

At IDS 2011, 1,954 companies from 58 countries participated and more than 100,000 trade visitors attended.

At IDS 2013, 2,058 companies from 56 countries presented their products on exhibition space covering 150,000 m^{2}. The exhibition had more than 125,000 trade visitors from 149 countries.

The 36th International Dental Show took place from 10 to 14 March 2015, on a total exhibition area of 157,000 m^{2}. There were a record number of visitors (138,500), and 2,201 companies from 56 countries participated.

The 37th International Dental Show took place from 21 to 25 March 2017. A total of 2,236 exhibitors from 58 countries and 155,132 visitors from 156 countries participated in the event.

The 38th International Dental Show from March 12 to 16, 2019 attracted 160,000 professional visitors from 166 countries. At the fair, there were 2,327 exhibitors from 64 countries on an exhibition space of 170,000 square meters. This increased the total number of visitors by 3.2%.

The 39th International Dental Show was scheduled to take place from March 9 to 13, 2021, but was postponed to September 22 to 25, 2021, due to COVID-19.

The 40th International Dental Show also marked the 100th anniversary of this event and took place from March 11 to 18, 2023, where the digital daughter company IDS online was introduced for the first time.

== Trade fair statistic ==
Year	Exhibitors	Visitors	exhibition space in m²
2007	1.742	100.522	133.800
2009	1.823	106.147	138.000
2011	1.954	117.697	145.000
2013	2.058	125.327	150.000
2015	2.201	138.500	157.000
2017	2.236	155.132	--
2019	2.327	160.000	170.000
2021	830*	23.000*	115.000* (corona year)
2023	1.788	120.000	180.000
