= International Dermoscopy Society =

- Abbreviation: IDS
- Formation: 2003
- Type: Professional
- Headquarters: Graz, Austria
- President: Iris Zalaudek
- General Secretary: Aimilios Lallas
- Past President: Giuseppe Argenziano
- Past President: Peter Soyer
- Website: dermoscopy-ids.org

International Dermoscopy Society (IDS) is a non-governmental organization offering comprehensive promotion of dermoscopy, also known as dermatoscopy. It has over 16,000 international members from over 160 countries.

== Overview ==
Dermoscopy is a valuable diagnostic tool in dermatology for correct identification and management of skin tumors, inflammatory skin conditions and skin infections. Hans Peter Soyer (Past President), Rainer Hofmann-Wellenhof (Treasurer) and Giuseppe Argenziano (Past President) founded the society in 2003 in Graz, Austria, which is also home to the society's head offices. The current President is Aimilios Lallas and the General Secretary is Caterina Longo.

== Activities ==
Every three years, the IDS hosts a world congress and its 6th World Congress of Dermoscopy, will be held in Buenos Aires, Argentina in 2024. Each year, the IDS also organizes scientific meetings at the annual international congresses organized by the American Academy of Dermatology and the European Academy of Dermatology and Venereology.

== Journal ==
The IDS’ official medical journal is Dermatology Practical & Conceptual (DPC). The DPC journal is an international, peer-reviewed and open-access journal indexed on PubMed. The journal focuses on clinical research articles within the field of dermatology.

The IDS is also an Affiliated Member Society of the International League of Dermatological Societies.

== Past World Congresses of Dermoscopy ==
- 1st World Congress of Dermoscopy: Naples, Italy – April 27–29, 2006
- 2nd World Congress of Dermoscopy: Barcelona, Spain – November 12–14, 2009
- 3rd World Congress of Dermoscopy: Brisbane, Australia – May 17–19, 2012
- 4th World Congress of Dermoscopy: Vienna, Austria – April 16–18, 2015
- 5th World Congress of Dermoscopy: Thessaloniki, Greece – June 14–16, 2018
