= Sabina Jeschke =

German computer scientist

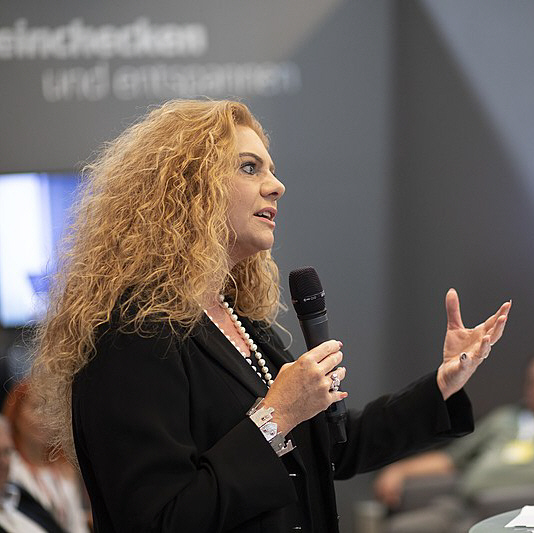
- Jeschke in 2018
- Born: 27 July 1968 (age 58); Kungälv, Sweden
- Citizenship: Germany
- Education: Technische Universität Berlin (2004, PhD)
- Scientific career
- Fields: Computer Science
- Workplaces: RWTH Aachen University; University of Stuttgart; TU Berlin

Sabina Jeschke (born 27 July 1968 in Kungälv, Sweden) is a German university professor for information sciences in mechanical engineering at the RWTH Aachen University. As of 10 November 2017, she was named member of the management board of Deutschen Bahn AG for digitalization and technology. She is also the director of the Cybernetics Lab IMA/ZLW & IfU. In the summer semester of 2017, she is on sabbatical leave to develop her research in the area of artificial consciousness (artificial / machine consciousness), and is involved in building a think tank "Strong Artificial Intelligence" at the Volvo Car Corporation in Göteborg. Since May 2015, Jeschke has been a member of the supervisory board of Körber AG, since April 2012 chairman of the board of VDI Aachen. Beginning of January 2023 she took on an additional position as a senior advisor at Arthur D. Little.

== Life and work ==
Jeschke studied physics and computer sciences at the Technische Universität Berlin, Germany. She completed her student research project during a research stay at the NASA Ames Research Center Moffett Field, California, USA under the direction of William (Bill) Borucki. During her doctoral studies she worked as a scientific researcher at the Institut für Mathematik at the Technische Universität Berlin and as an assistant professor/instructor at the Georgia Institute of Technology in Atlanta, US.

In 2004 she obtained her doctorate degree (Dr. rer. nat.) with honors. After two years, Sabina Jeschke became a junior professor for New Media in Mathematics and Natural Sciences at the Technische Universität Berlin. As from 2007 she held a full professorship at the Institute for IT Service Technologies (IITS) and simultaneously became the director of the Central Information Technology Services (IT-Center) (RUS) at the University of Stuttgart, Germany. Additionally she was a visiting professor and head of the former Center for Multimedia in Teaching and Research (MuLF) now innoCampus at the Technische Universität Berlin. In 2009 she followed the call of the RWTH Aachen University and became a professor and the director of the Institute Cluster IMA/ZLW & IfU at the Faculty of Mechanical Engineering. Until 2010 she additionally functioned as a visiting professor with scientific direction of research projects at the Institut für Technische Optik (ITO) of the University of Stuttgart, Germany. From October 2011 to September 2016, she was vice dean of the Faculty of Mechanical Engineering at the RWTH Aachen University.

Some of the main areas of her research are robotics and automation technology (heterogeneous and cooperative robotics, web services in robotics), traffic and mobility (autonomous and semi-autonomous transport systems, international logistics, car2car & car2X models), Internet of Things and cyber-physical systems (industry 4.0, semantic web services), Artificial Intelligence (data integration and data mining, multi-agency systems, cognitive computing), human-machine interaction (virtual and remote laboratories, intelligent training environments), innovation research (innovation fields, trend monitoring) and information management (integration technologies for information services, innovative learning and teaching concepts).

She is a member and expert in numerous committees and commissions, inter alia Senior Member of the Institute of Electrical and Electronics Engineers (IEEE) since 2011 and a member of the Program Committee "Robotics and Automation" of the German Aerospace Center (DLR) since 2017. In July 2014, she was honored by the German Society of Computer Science (GI) with the recognition of Germany's digital minds. For her contributions to a modern engineering education, she was awarded the Golden Nikola Tesla Chain of the International Society for Engineering Pedagogy (IGIP) in September 2015. Together with the Carologistics team of RWTH Aachen University and the University of Applied Sciences of Aachen she won the World Championship title in the RoboCup Logistics League 2014, 2015 and 2016 for three years in a row. Jeschke heads the IMA/ZLW & IfU Cybernetics Lab (as of November 2017). She has served as member of the supervisory board of Körber AG since May 2015 and member of the executive board of VDI – The Association of German Engineers since April 2012. Jeschke took a sabbatical during the 2017 summer semester to focus on her research in artificial/machine consciousness and was involved establishing the Strong Artificial Intelligence think tank at Volvo in Gothenburg, Sweden. Dr. Jeschke is considered an excellent public speaker and is fluent in German, English and Swedish.

== Deutsche Bahn ==
Jeschke was appointed to the management board of Deutsche Bahn on 10 November 2017, effective mid-November of that year. On the board, she was responsible for digitalization and technology. Her contract, which was initially for three years, was extended by the Supervisory Board on 11 December 2019 for five years, until the end of 2025. As of the beginning of 2020, she also was responsible for heavy vehicle maintenance. On 18 February 2021 Jeschke announced her intention to terminate her Management Board contract prematurely on 31 May 2021 "at her own request and on the best of amicable terms". She was succeeded by Daniela Gerd tom Markotten on 15 September 2021.

== Entrepreneurial activity ==
Sabina Jeschke is extensively involved in the area of start-ups/entrepreneurship and has been active as a founder herself on several occasions. In April 2021, she founded Arctic Brains AB, a private AB under Swedish law, for development and consulting in the field of Artificial Intelligence. Since 10/2021 she has been Chair of the Board of KI Park e.V. in Berlin, which aims to become the most far-reaching AI ecosystem for next generation AI applications in Europe and in September 2023 she was re-elected as Chair of the Board for another 2 years. In December 2021, together with her business partners, she founded Quantagonia GmbH, in which she and her partners deal with porting technologies of traditional codes for quantum computing environments.

== Books ==
- Song, Houbing; Rawat, Danda; Jeschke, Sabina; Brecher, Christian, eds. (2016). Cyber-Physical Systems - Foundations, Principles and Applications. Springer-Verlag. ISBN 9780128038017.
- Jeschke, Sabina; Brecher, Christian; Song, Houbing; Rawat, Danda B., eds. (2016). Industrial Internet of Things - Cybermanufacturing Systems. Springer Series in Wireless Technology. Springer-Verlag. doi:10.1007/978-3-319-42559-7. hdl:10400.26/30686. ISBN 978-3-319-42558-0.
- Jeschke, Sabina; Isenhardt, Ingrid; Hees, Frank; Henning, Klaus, eds. (2016). Automation, Communication and Cybernetics in Science and Engineering 2015/2016. Springer-Verlag. ISBN 978-3-319-42620-4.
- Jeschke, Sabina; Richert, Anja; Hees, Frank; Jooß, Claudia, eds. (2015). Exploring demographics -- Transdisziplinäre Perspektiven zur Innovationsfähigkeit im demografischen Wandel. Springer Fachmedien Wiesbaden. doi:10.1007/978-3-658-08791-3. ISBN 978-3-658-08790-6.
- Jeschke, Sabina; Isenhardt, Ingrid; Hees, Frank; Henning, Klaus, eds. (2014). Automation, Communication and Cybernetics in Science and Engineering 2013/2014. Springer-Verlag. ISBN 978-3-319-08816-7.
- Jeschke, Sabina; Kobbelt, Leif; Dröge, Alicia, eds. (2014). Exploring Virtuality – Virtualität im interdisziplinären Diskurs. Springer Spektrum. ISBN 978-3-658-03885-4.
- Jeschke, Sabina; Hees, Frank; Richert, Anja; Trantow, Sven, eds. (2012). Prethinking Work - Insights on the Future of Work 2011/2012. LIT. ISBN 978-3-643-90240-5.
- Jeschke, Sabina; Liu, Honghai; Schilberg, Daniel, eds. (2011). Intelligent Robotics and Applications (Part I and II). Springer-Verlag. ISBN 978-3-642-25486-4; ISBN 978-3-642-25489-5
- Jeschke, Sabina; Isenhardt, Ingrid; Hees, Frank; Trantow, Sven, eds. (2011). Enabling Innovation. Innovative Capability - German and International Views. Springer-Verlag. doi:10.1007/978-3-642-24503-9. ISBN 978-3-642-24503-9.
