= Selecta (company) =

Swiss vending machine company

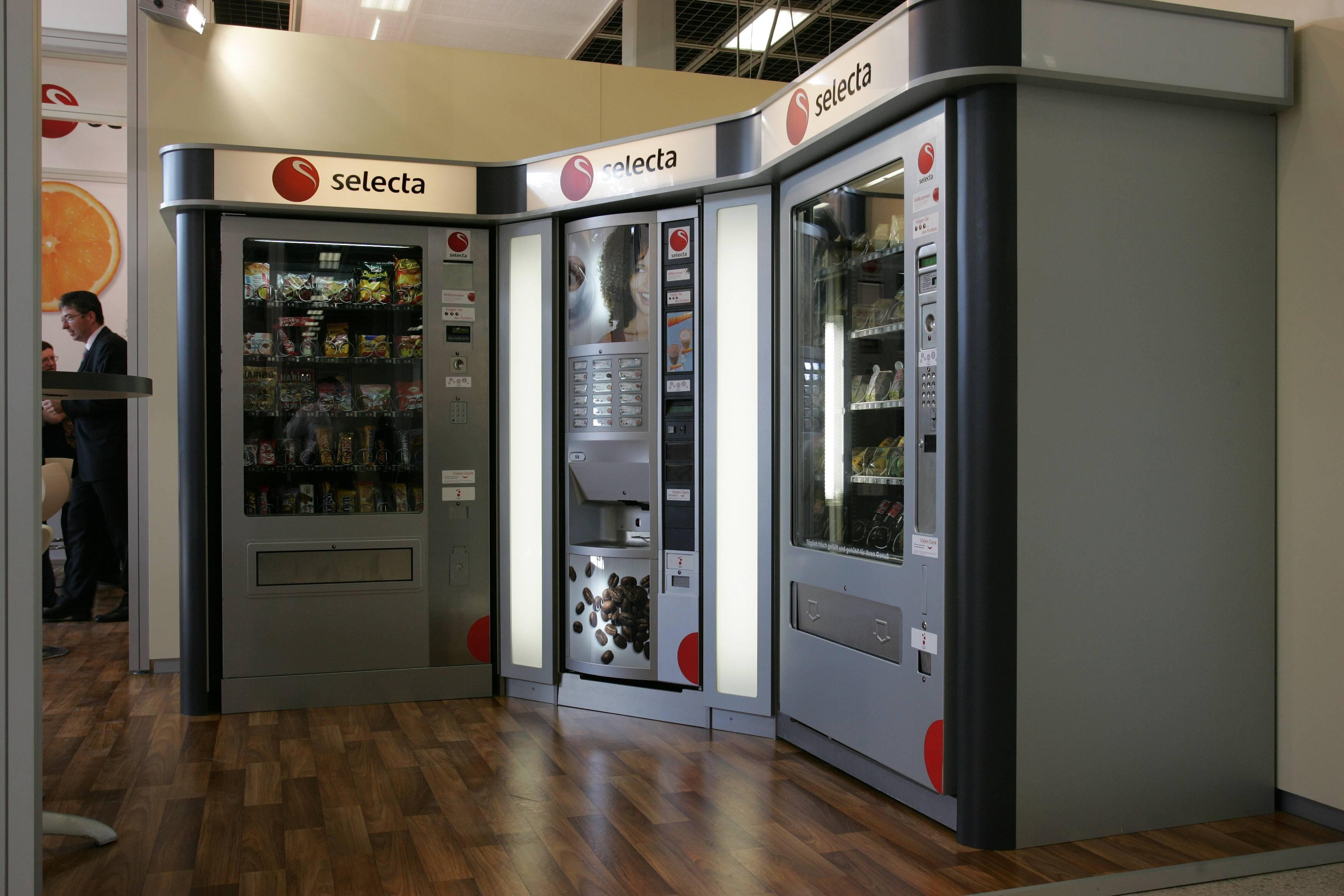
- Industry: Vending and coffee services operator
- Founded: 1957; 69 years ago in Murten, Switzerland
- Founder: Joseph Jeger
- Headquarters: Cham, Switzerland (canton of Zug)
- Area served: Europe
- Products: Coffee vending machines
- Revenue: €1.6 billion
- Number of employees: 10,000
- Parent: Kohlberg Kravis Roberts
- Website: www.selecta.com

Selecta Group is a European unattended self-service retailer founded in 1957 in Murten, Switzerland. It is owned by the American investment firm Kohlberg Kravis Roberts & Co. The company provides coffee and convenience foods in the workplace and public spaces. It is headquartered in Cham, Switzerland. In 2019, the company had approximately 10,000 employees and generated approximately €1.6 billion in revenue.

== History ==
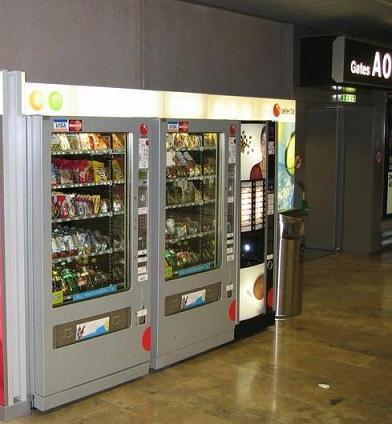
Public vending

In 1950, Joseph Jeger, a Swiss employee working in Basel, went on a business trip to the United States and saw his first vending machines in factories there. He thought it would be a great idea to put similar vending machines in the factory of the company he worked for. Spending all his savings, he ordered five machines from the US producer and was allowed to install them in the factory. Joseph Jeger's employer is still a client of Selecta.

Factory workers used Jeger's machines day in and day out. The American machines were produced with American fittings, making them expensive to maintain. To overcome this, Jeger rented a garage in his hometown of Murten, hired his first employee and produced the first vending machine made in Switzerland. This vending machine was the first to carry the name Selecta in 1957.

=== Milestones ===
- 1957 - Selecta founded in Switzerland.
- 1985 - Selecta joins the Valora Group.
- 1997 - Selecta floats on the Swiss Stock Exchange at CHF 515 million.
- 2001 - Compass Group acquires Selecta for CHF 1.35 billion.
- 2007 - Selecta is purchased by Allianz Capital Partners for CHF 1.80 billion.
- 2012 - Selecta partners with Starbucks to launch Starbucks Office Coffee.
- 2015 - Selecta is purchased by KKR for CHF 3.7bn.
- 2017 - Selecta acquires Pelican Rouge, a company with operations in eight European countries. Selecta also acquires Pelican Rouge's roasting facility in the Netherlands.
- 2018 - Selecta acquires Argenta and Express Vending in the UK.
