= Anuga Food Fair =

Food festival in Cologne, Germany

The Allgemeine Nahrungs- und Genussmittel-Ausstellung (Anuga) (“General Food and Drink Trade Fair") is described by promoters as the world's largest and most important food and beverage fair.

“Anuga” takes place every second year in Cologne, and is sub-divided into ten separate fairs, each covering a different category. The event is held in the Koelnmesse, adjacent to the city centre.

== History ==
The first "Anuga" took place in 1919 in Stuttgart as part of a national gathering organised by Germany's specialist food retailers, and was a relatively small scale affair, involving approximately 200 exhibitors, and without any participation from foreign businesses. It was sufficiently successful to persuade the organisers to make the food fair an annual event, to be linked with the annual meeting of the nation's Specialist Foods Retailers' Association (Reichsverband deutscher Feinkostkaufleute).

Initially a different location was selected each year, with the event being held in Munich (1920), Hannover (1921), Berlin (1922) and Magdeburg (1923).

The first Cologne Anuga was held between 17 and 24 August 1924, attracting 340 exhibitors and around 40,000 visitors. It was probably the largest Anuga during the inter-war period, already divided into eight sub-categories, covering Food and Drink, Cooking and Bakery equipment, Food Processing machinery, Packaging Material and equipment, Retail, Materials Handling, Chemical and Cosmetic preparations and Advertising. The success of the 1924 event was partly the result of the professionalism with which it was conducted, but there was also a political dimension, with Cologne economically cut off from the rest of the country by foreign military occupation. The success of the 1924 Anuga could be presented as a demonstration against the British occupation, and the fair was described in the programme as a patriotic gesture (eine "gute deutsche Tat").

== Dates and recent participation statistics ==
- In 2011 ”Anuga” was open over five days ending on 12 October, during which 154,516 trade visitors were welcomed to 6,409 trade stands representing 97 countries.
- In 2013 ”Anuga” ended on 9 October after welcoming approximately 155,000 visitors to 6,777 trade stands.
- The 2015 fair took place between 10 and 14 October.
- The 2017 fair took place between 7 and 11 October.
- The 2025 fair took place between 4 and 8 October.
- The 2027 fair will take place between 9 and 13 October.
