= List of foods named after people =

This is a list of foods and dishes named after people.

== A ==
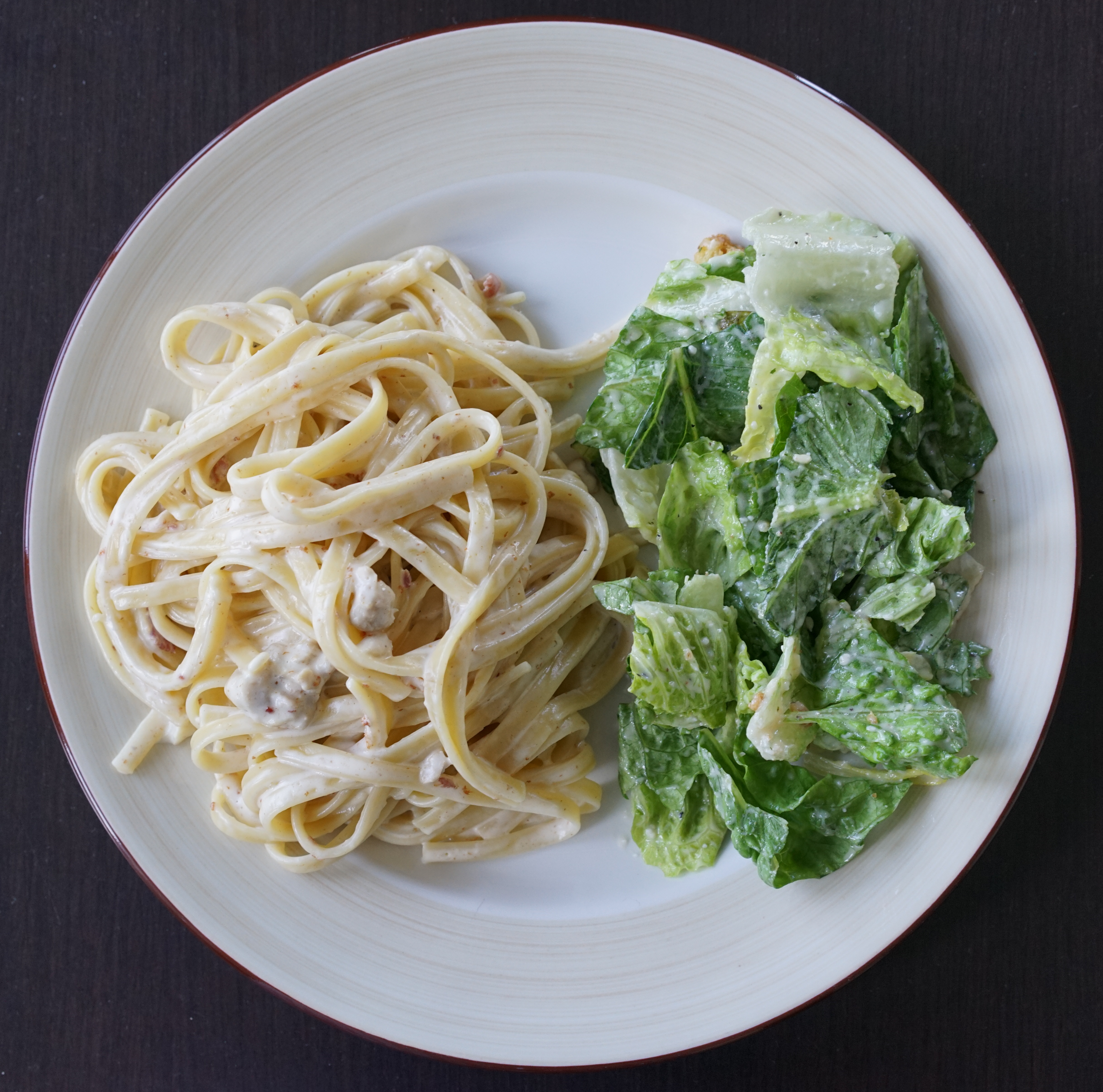
Fettuccine Alfredo with chicken (left)

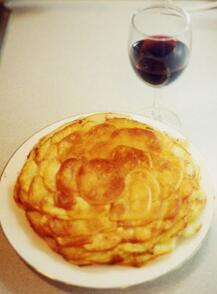
Pommes Anna

- Poularde Adelina Patti – named for 19th-century opera singer Adelina Patti.
- Woodcock salmis Agnès Sorel – one of the dishes Agnès Sorel (1422–1450) is reputed to have created herself. A garnish, soup, timbales, and tartlets all bear her name, as later chefs remembered her for her interest in food.
- Big Hearted Al candy bar – early-20th-century presidential candidate Al Smith had this candy bar named after him by an admirer who owned a candy company. After Smith lost the presidential election of 1928 to Herbert Hoover, the candy bar was discontinued.
- Fillet of Beef Prince Albert – Queen Victoria's Consort Prince Albert (1819–1861). Also named for him: Albert sauce a white sauce, the pea and apple varieties, Coburg Soup (brussels sprouts and smoked bacon) and probably Albert Pudding.
- Poularde Albufera, Albufera Sauce – Louis Gabriel Suchet (1770–1826), one of Napoleon's generals and Marshal of France for a time, was named duc d'Albufera after a lake near Valencia, Spain, to mark his victory there during the Peninsular War. Marie-Antoine Carême created several dishes in the duke's honor, including duck, beef, and the sauce that accompanies this chicken.
- Alexandertorte – possibly Tsar Alexander I, the gourmet Russian tsar who employed Antonin Carême. Finland claims the creation, allegedly by Swiss pastry chefs in Helsinki in 1818, in anticipation of the tsar's visit there.
- Gâteau Alexandra – like her husband Edward VII, Alexandra of Denmark (1844–1925) was honoured by an assortment of foods named after her when she was Princess of Wales and Queen. Besides this chocolate cake, there is consommé Alexandra, soup, sole, chicken quail, and various meat dishes.
- Lobster Duke Alexis – the Russian Grand-Duke Alexis made a highly publicized visit to the U.S. in 1871. A dinner for him at Delmonico's featured this, and was kept on the menu by chef Charles Ranhofer.
- Fettuccine Alfredo – Alfredo di Lelio, an early-20th-century Italian chef invented the dish for his pregnant wife at his Roman restaurant and popularized it among tourists.
- Consommé Princess Alice – this consommé with artichoke hearts and lettuce is named for Princess Alice, Countess of Athlone (1883–1981), one of Queen Victoria's granddaughters.
- Alice B. Toklas' hashish fudge – due to the recipe being included in her book, The Alice B. Toklas Cook Book.
- Amêijoas à Bulhão Pato – Portuguese poet, essay writer, memorialist, member of the Royal Academy of Sciences of Lisbon, renowned bon vivant and epicurean.
- Omelette André Theuriet – the French novelist and poet André Theuriet (1833–1907) has this omelette with truffles and asparagus named for him.
- Angelina Burdett plum – bred by a Mr. Dowling of Southampton, England around 1850, was named after the philanthropist Baroness Angelina Burdett-Coutts (1814–1906).
- Pommes Anna – the casserole of sliced potatoes cooked in butter was created and named by French chef Adolphe Dugléré for the 19th-century courtesan/actress Anna Deslions, who frequented Dugléré's Café Anglais (Paris). "Potatoes Annette" is a version of Potatoes Anna, with the potatoes julienned instead of in rounds.
- Arnold Palmer – beverage of half lemonade and half iced-tea, named for the golfer, Arnold Palmer.
- Omelette Arnold Bennett – an unfolded omelette with smoked haddock invented at the Savoy Hotel for the writer Arnold Bennett
- Oreiller de la Belle Aurore – Claudine-Aurore Récamier, the mother of Jean Anthelme Brillat-Savarin, also has a lobster dish named after her but this elaborate game pie was one of her son's favorite dishes. The large square pie contains a variety of game birds and their livers, veal, pork, truffles, aspic, and much else, in puff pastry.
- Château Ausone red Bordeaux wine – Ausonius (310–395), the poet employed by Valentinian I to tutor the Roman emperor's son, retired to the Bordeaux region and wrote about oyster farming. The wine named after him is said to be made of grapes grown on the site of his villa.

== B ==
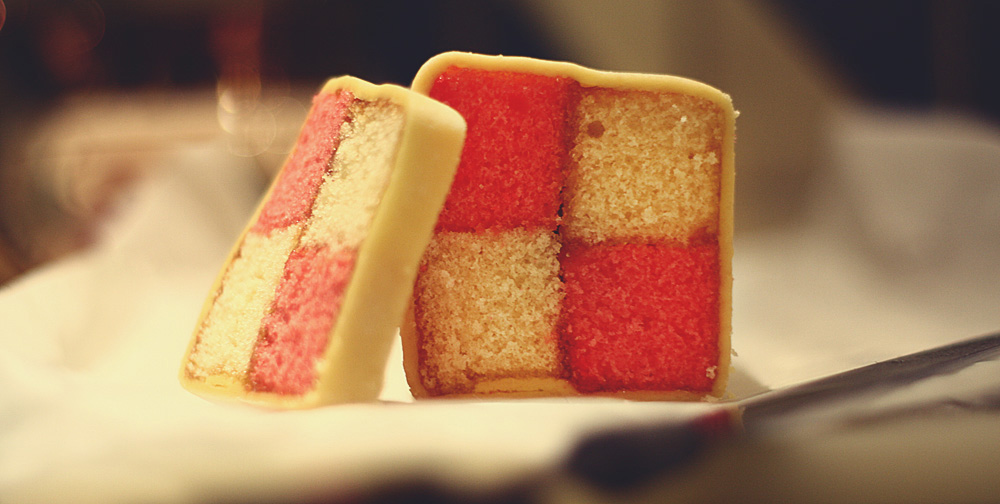
Battenberg cake

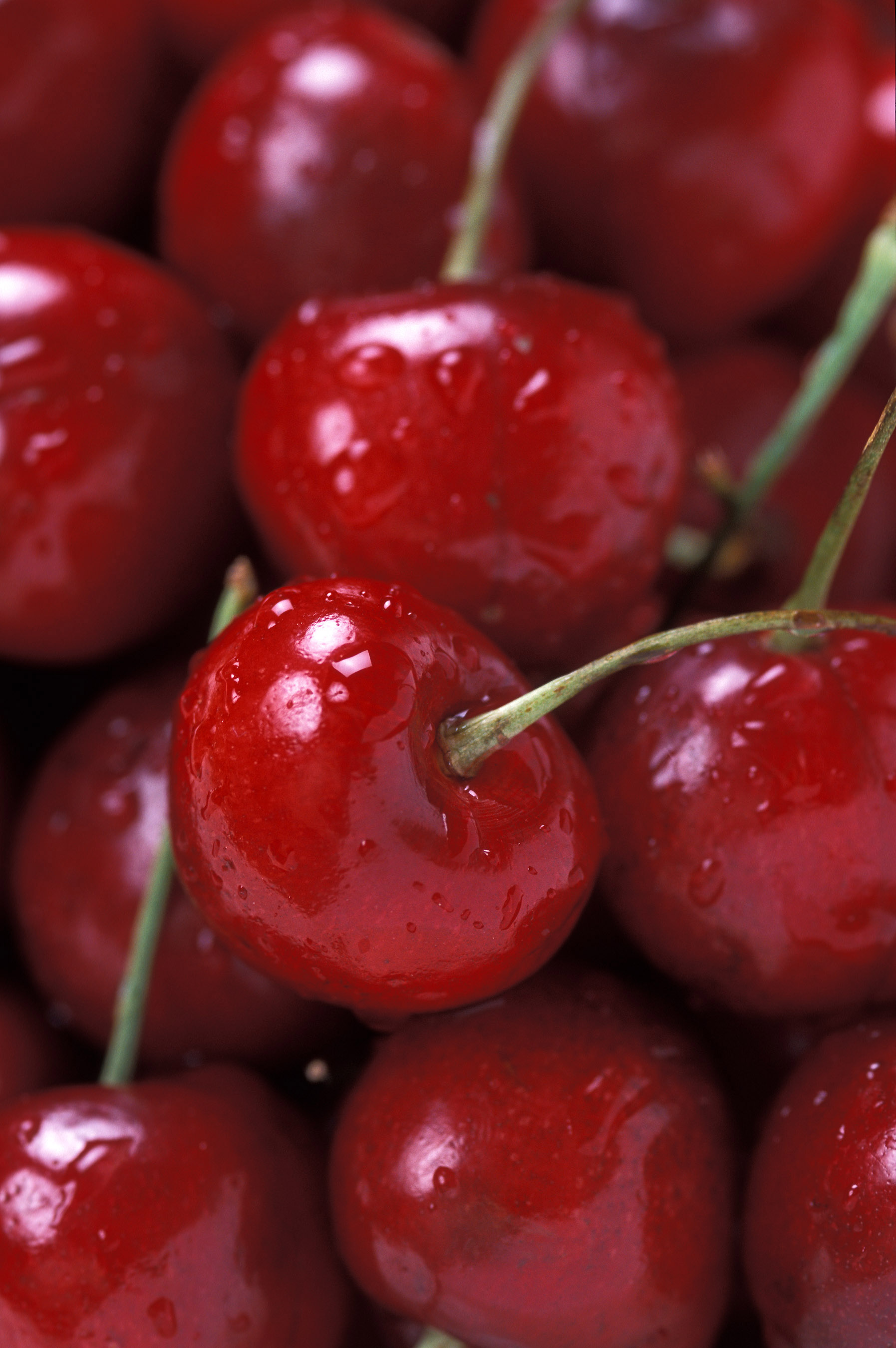
Bing cherries

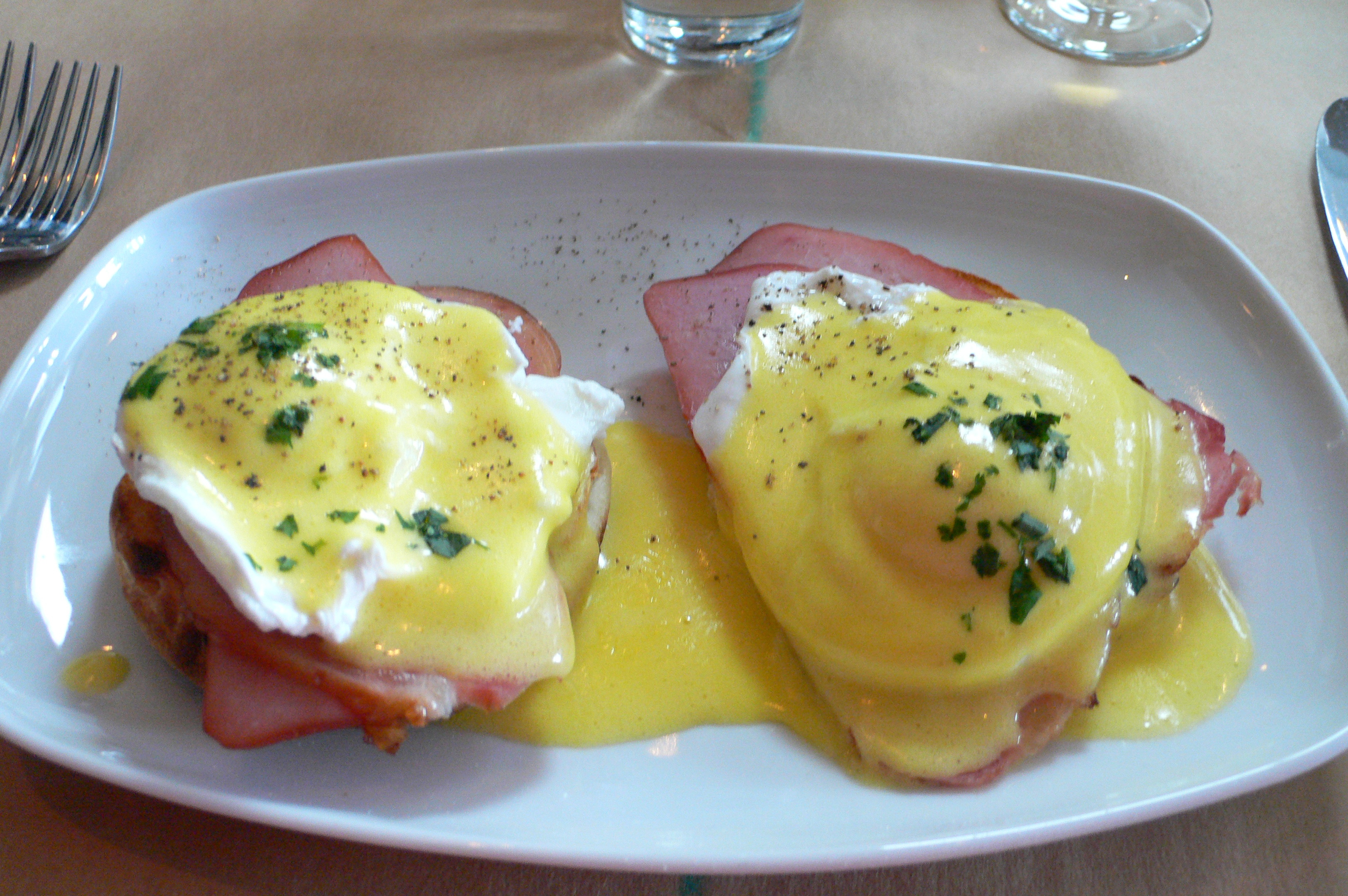
Eggs Benedict

- Bachwürfel – a cubiform confectionery named after Johann Sebastian Bach, following the style of the Mozartkugel.
- Baco noir – a hybrid grape, named after its breeder, Maurice Baco.
- Baldwin apple – Colonel Loammi Baldwin (1745–1807), a commander of militia at the Battle of Lexington, found this apple between 1784 and 1793 while working as a surveyor and engineer on the Middlesex Canal in Massachusetts.
- Chicken Cardinal la Balue – Cardinal Jean la Balue (1421–1491), a somewhat notorious minister to Louis XI, is remembered in this dish of chicken, crayfish, and mashed potatoes.
- Barros Luco – is a popular hot sandwich in Chile that includes beef and melted cheese in one of several types of bread. The sandwich is named after Chilean president Ramón Barros Luco, and was coined in the restaurant of the National Congress of Chile, where president Luco always asked for this sandwich.
- Bartlett pear – The English Williams pear variety was inadvertently renamed by Massachusetts nurseryman Enoch Bartlett, early 19th century. Williams was a 17th-century English horticulturist.
- Bauru – This popular Brazilian sandwich was created by college student Casimiro Pinto Neto, nicknamed "Bauru."
- Battenberg cake – probably named after one of the late-19th-century princely Battenberg family living in England, who gave up their German titles during World War I and changed their name to Mountbatten.
- Béarnaise sauce – although often thought to indicate the region of Béarn, the sauce name may well originate in the nickname of French king Henry IV (1553–1610), "le Grand Béarnais."
- Béchamel sauce – named to flatter the maître d'Hotel to Louis XIV, Louis de Béchamel, Marquis de Nointel (1630–1703), also a financier and ambassador.
- Bellini (cocktail) – Giovanni Bellini
- Ham mousseline à la Belmont – August Belmont (1816–1890) was born in Prussia and emigrated to the U.S. to work for the New York branch of Rothschild's. He became an extremely wealthy banker, married the daughter of Commodore Matthew Perry, and was a leading figure in New York society and American horse racing. This dish was created at Delmonico's by Charles Ranhofer, probably for a dinner given there in Belmont's honor.
- Eggs Benedict – at least two main accounts. Lemuel Benedict, a New York stockbroker, claimed to have gone to the Waldorf Hotel for breakfast one day in 1894 while suffering a hangover. He asked for a restorative in the form of toast, bacon, poached eggs, and Hollandaise sauce on the side. The maître d' (Oscar of the Waldorf) took an interest in Benedict's order, and adapted it for the Waldorf menu, substituting English muffins and ham, adding truffles, and naming it after Benedict. The other version: in 1893, Charles Ranhofer, head chef of Delmonico's, created the dish for Mr. and/or Mrs. LeGrand Benedict, New York stockbroker and socialite.
- Eggs Benedict XVI – German-born Pope Benedict XVI now has a Germanic version of the original Eggs Benedict named after him. Rye bread and sausage or sauerbraten replace the English muffins and Canadian bacon.
- Ben-Gurion's rice – folk name for Israeli couscous, named for Israeli Prime Minister David Ben-Gurion, who spurred Eugen Proper, one of the founders of Osem, to devise a wheat-based substitute for rice.
- Eggs Berlioz – Hector Berlioz (1803–1869), the notable French composer, has his name on a dish of soft-boiled eggs, elevated by the addition of croustades, duchesse potatoes, and truffles and mushrooms in a Madeira sauce.
- Beyti kebab – Beyti Güler, Turkish restaurateur.
- Bibb lettuce – John B. Bibb, mid-19th-century amateur horticulturist of Frankfort, Kentucky.
- Oysters Bienville – this New Orleans dish of baked oysters in a shrimp sauce was named for Jean-Baptiste Le Moyne de Bienville (1680–1767), French governor of Louisiana and founder of New Orleans (1718).
- Bing cherry – Oregon horticulturist Seth Luelling (or Lewelling) developed the cherry around 1875, with the help of his Manchurian foreman Bing, after whom he named it.
- Bintje – a very successful potato variety created by Dutch schoolteacher Kornelis Lieuwes De Vries who in 1905 named it after one of his pupils: the then 17 year old Bintje Jansma. In 1976 she died in Franeker (Friesland) at age 88. The Bintje is equally suitable for boiling, baking, and for French fries, mashed potato and potato chips. It is the most widely cultivated potato in France and Belgium.
- Bismarck herring, Bismarcks, Schlosskäse Bismarck – Otto von Bismarck (1815–1898), chief figure in the unification of Germany in 1870 and first Chancellor of the German Empire, has many foods named after him, including pickled herring, pastry, and cheese.
- Eggs in a Mold Bizet – Georges Bizet (1838–1875), the French composer of Carmen and other operas, has a consommé named for him as well as these eggs cooked in molds lined with minced pickled tongue, served on artichoke hearts.
- Sole Bolivar – South American revolutionary Simón Bolívar (1783–1830).
- Bolo Martha Rocha – a cake named after Martha Rocha, the 1954 Miss Brazil.
- Bonaparte's Ribs – an early-19th-century English sweet named after Napoleon Bonaparte
- Boysenberry – Rudolf Boysen, botanist and Anaheim park superintendent, developed the loganberry/raspberry/blackberry cross around the 1920s. The berry was subsequently grown, named and marketed in the 1930s by Walter Knott of Knott's Berry Farm in California.
- Bramley apple – Matthew Bramley, butcher who in 1846 bought a cottage in Southwell, Nottinghamshire, England, which had previously belonged to Mary Ann Brailsford, who had planted the first bramley tree there in 1809.
- Brillat-Savarin cheese – Jean Anthelme Brillat-Savarin (1755–1826) has many dishes named for him besides this cheese, including partridge, eggs, garnishes, savory pastries, and the Savarin cake. Brillat-Savarin was the influential French author of The Physiology of Taste, in which he advocated viewing cuisine as a science.
- Hot Brown – J. Graham Brown, owner of the Brown Hotel, which first served the hot sandwich.
- Parson Brown orange – Rev. Nathan L. Brown, 19th-century Florida minister and orange grower, developed what was to become the leading commercial orange of the time in the U.S.
- Burbank plum – Luther Burbank (1849–1926), renowned American horticulturist, bred many new varieties of plants, including this and the Russet Burbank potato.

== C ==
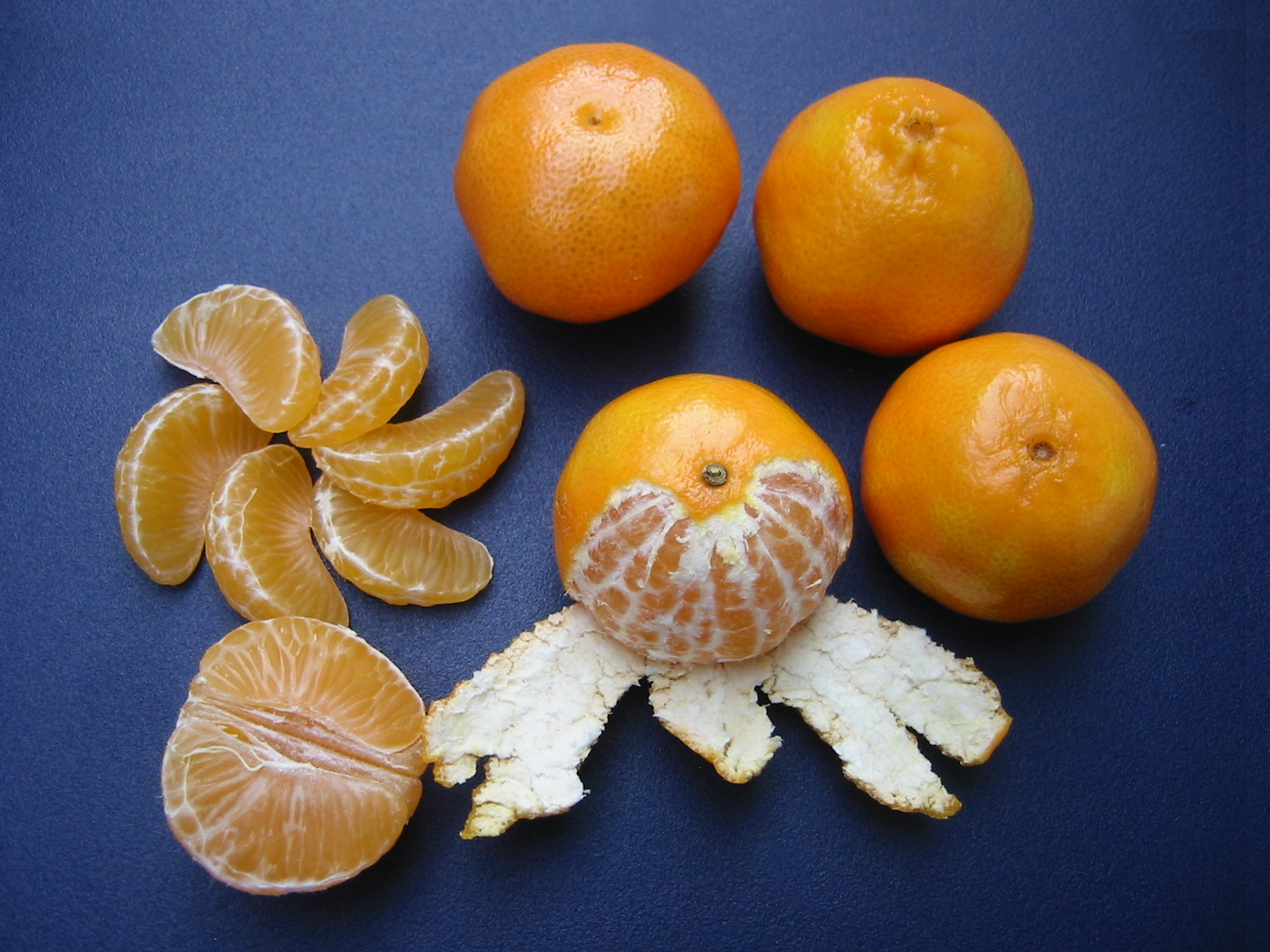
Five clementines whole, peeled, halved and sectioned

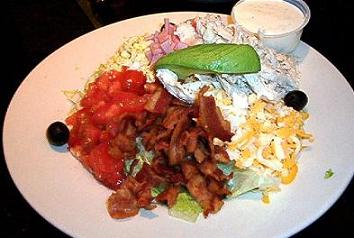
A Cobb salad

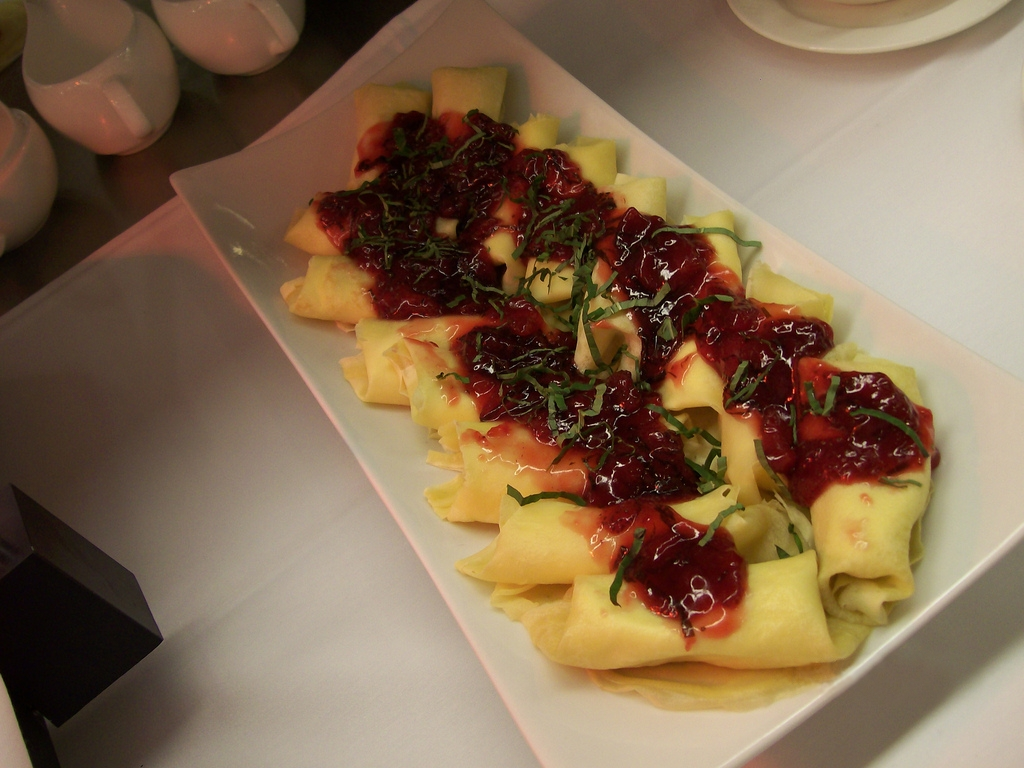
Cumberland sauce atop duck confit crepes

- Caesar cocktail – named for Julius Caesar by Canadian bartender Walter Chell.
- Caesar's mushroom – probably named for Julius Caesar, this mushroom of southern France is also called the King of Mushrooms. There is also a Caesar potato.
- Caesar salad – Caesar Cardini (1896–1956) or one of his associates created this salad at the restaurant of the Hotel Caesar in Tijuana.
- Carpaccio – named for painter Vittore Carpaccio. So named due to the similarity of the color of the thinly sliced raw beef to the red hue Carpaccio was known for.
- Caruso sauce – Enrico Caruso
- Galantine of pheasants Casimir-Perier – Casimir-Perier (1847–1907) was a French politician working under Sadi Carnot, who briefly took office after Carnot was assassinated. Casimir-Perier was president for six months, until he resigned in 1895 under attacks from the leftist opposition party. Charles Ranhofer named this dish and one of palmettes after him.
- Chaliapin steak – made by the order of Feodor Chaliapin (1873–1938) in Japan.
- Charlotte Corday – Charlotte Corday (1768–1793), the assassin of the radical Jean-Paul Marat was paid tribute with an ice cream dessert by Charles Ranhofer of Delmonico's.
- Charlotte Russe – a dessert invented by the French chef Marie-Antoine Carême (1784–1833), who named it in honor of his Russian employer Czar Alexander I ("Russe" being the French equivalent of the adjective, "Russian"). Other historians say that this sweet dish took its name from Queen Charlotte (1744–1818), wife of George III.
- Chateaubriand – a cut and a recipe for steak named for Vicomte François-René de Chateaubriand (1768–1848), French writer and diplomat. His chef Montinireil is thought to have created the dish around 1822 while Chateaubriand was ambassador to England. There is also a kidney dish named for him.
- Chiboust cream – a cream filling invented by the French pastry chef Chiboust in Paris around 1846, and intended to fill his Gâteau Saint-Honoré. The filling is also called Saint-Honoré cream.
- Choron sauce – Alexandre Étienne Choron
- Christian IX cheese – honoring King Christian IX of Denmark (1818–1906), this is a caraway-seeded semi-firm Danish cheese.
- Chaudfroid of chicken Clara Morris – Clara Morris (1848–1925) was a popular 19th-century American actress, specializing in the period's emotional dramas. She became something of an overnight success when she debuted in New York in 1870, after growing up and working in Ohio ballet and theater. She had an active career until taste in drama changed in the 1890s and she turned to writing. Ranhofer named this dish for her.
- Clementines – named for Père Clément Rodier, a French monk living in North Africa at the beginning of the 20th century. Allegedly, he either found a natural mutation of the mandarin orange which he grew, or he created a hybrid of the mandarin and the Seville oranges. The fruit, however, may have originated long before in Asia.
- Cleopatra Mandarin – presumably, Cleopatra VII (69–30 BC), of the Ptolemaic dynasty, and the last queen of Egypt, is the name source for this orange and the 'Cleopatra' ('Ortley') apple.
- Peach pudding à la Cleveland – Grover Cleveland (1837–1908), 22nd and 24th U.S. president, was given this dish by Charles Ranhofer, who may have felt presidents deserved desserts named after them as much as Escoffier's ladies, even if Cleveland was reputed to not much like French food.
- Veuve Clicquot – a brand of Champagne, named after Barbe-Nicole Ponsardin the widow ('veuve' in French) of François Clicquot.
- Cobb salad – Robert H. Cobb, owner of the Hollywood Brown Derby restaurant, who is said to have invented the salad as a late-night snack for himself around 1936–1937.
- Scrambled eggs à la Columbus – Christopher Columbus (1451–1506), the Italian sailor who claimed the New World for Spain, has a dish of scrambled eggs with ham, fried slices of blood pudding and beef brains named after him. He is also among those in whose honour a French consommé has been named.
- Consommés: there are French consommés named in honour of, among others, Adelina Patti, Baron Brisse, Brillat Savarin, Antonin Carême, Camillo Benso, Count of Cavour, Christopher Columbus, Cyrano de Bergerac, Madame Dubarry, Edward VII, Charles Elmé Francatelli, Giuseppe Garibaldi, Jenny Lind, Leo XIII, Lord Chesterfield, Klemens von Metternich, Molière, Montesquieu, Peter the Great and Gabrielle Réjane.
- Cox's Orange Pippin – apple named after its developer Richard Cox (1777–1845), a retired brewer, in Buckinghamshire, England.
- Lady Curzon Soup – Lady Curzon, née Mary Victoria Leiter (1870–1906), the wife of the Viceroy of India, Lord George Nathaniel Curzon, has this turtle soup with sherry attributed to her. Allegedly, she directed the inclusion of sherry when a teetotalling guest prevented the usual serving of alcohol at a dinner, around 1905. Lady Curzon was the daughter of Chicago businessman Levi Z. Leiter, who co-founded the original department store later called Marshall Field's.

== D ==
- Dartois – François-Victor-Armand Dartois (1780–1867), once very well known author of French vaudeville plays, is commemorated by this pastry, made in several versions both sweet and savory.
- Shrimp DeJonghe – shrimp and garlic casserole created at DeJonghe's Hotel, an early-20th-century restaurant in Chicago, owned by brothers from Belgium.
- Sirloin of beef à la de Lesseps – Ferdinand de Lesseps (1805–1894), French builder of the Suez Canal and first to try to build the Panama Canal, was honored with a dinner at Delmonico's in 1880. A banana dessert at the dinner was afterward termed "à la Panama." Ranhofer named this beef dish after de Lesseps, probably well before de Lesseps' 1889 bankruptcy scandal.
- Delmonico steak – named for the Delmonico brothers' restaurant Delmonico's, at one time considered the finest restaurant in the United States. Delmonico steak and Lobster à la Delmonico are among the many named for the restaurant and/or its owners. The restaurant's chef Charles Ranhofer (1836–1899) named many dishes after historic figures, celebrities of the day, and favored customers.
- Chicken Demidov – Anatoly Nikolaievich Demidov, 1st Prince of San Donato (1813–1870), from a wealthy Russian industrialist family, lived in Paris from an early age with his mother, Elizaveta Alexandrovna Stroganova, whose family's name is found on this list with Beef Stroganoff. Both were extreme admirers of Napoleon, to the point where Demidov had a brief marriage to Princess Mathilde Bonaparte, niece of Napoleon, and he also bought the Elba house of exile to turn into a museum. He was a patron of artists, and a bon vivant. There are two chicken dishes named after him. This one is elaborately stuffed, smothered, tied up and garnished. The Demidov (also seen as "Demidoff") name is also applied to dishes of rissoles and red snapper.
- Veal pie à la Dickens – probably around the time the popular novelist Charles Dickens (1812–1870) was making his second visit to New York, in 1867, Charles Ranhofer created this dish in his honor at Delmonico's. Ranhofer also had Beet fritters à la Dickens on the menu.
- Doboschtorte or Dobostorta – Josef Dobos, well-known Hungarian pastry chef, (born 1847), created the multi-layered chocolate torte in Budapest or Vienna.
- Dongpo pork – squares of pork, half lean meat and half fat, pan-fried then braised. Named after poet Su Dongpo (1037–1101)
- Soup du Barry – Madame du Barry (1743–1793), favorite of Louis XV after the death of Madame de Pompadour in 1764, had several dishes named for her, often involving cauliflower, as in this soup. The cauliflower is said to have been a reference to her elaborate powdered wigs.
- Sole Dubois – named for the 19th-century French chef Urbain Dubois. (see Veal Prince Orloff)
- Sole Dugléré – Adolphe Dugléré (1805–1884), starting as a student of Antonin Carême, became head chef at the famed Café Anglais in Paris in 1866, where he created and named many well-known dishes. Several dishes of fish bear his own name.
- Salad à la Dumas – Alexandre Dumas, père (1802–1870), noted French author. Apparently a favorite of Charles Ranhofer, there are also timbales, stewed woodcock, and mushrooms à la Dumas.
- Duxelles – a mushroom-based sauce or garnish attributed to the great 17th-century French chef François Pierre La Varenne (1615–1678) was probably named for his employer, Nicolas Chalon du Blé, marquis d'Uxelles. A variety of dishes use this name.

== E ==
- Poularde Edouard VII – like his mother Queen Victoria, Edward VII (1841–1910), noted as a gourmand, had many compliments paid him in the form of foods, both when he was Prince of Wales and later as King. Besides this chicken stuffed with foie gras, there are dishes of turbot, brill, sole, eggs, cake, the King Edward VII potato, the Edward VII apple, et al.
- Elliott Blueberry named for Arthur Elliot
- Endicott Pear – John Endicott (c. 1588–1665), early settler and governor of Massachusetts, imported pear trees from England (variety name unknown) c. 1630. The fruit was given his name.
- Esterhazy torte – named after Paul III Anton, Prince Esterházy, diplomat of the Austro-Hungarian Empire.
- Steak Esterházy – probably a 19th-century Prince Esterházy of Hungary, of a family close to Austrian royalty.
- Sweetbreads à l'Eugénie – Eugénie de Montijo (1826–1920), wife of Napoleon III, was very probably the inspiration for this dish by Charles Ranhofer.
- Eve's Pudding – British apple pudding named after Eve, because of the presence of apples in the dessert. The pudding was first mentioned in 1823.
- Elvis Sandwich – A favorite of American rock musician Elvis Presley, a peanut butter, banana and bacon sandwich.

== F ==
- Marechal Foch – a hybrid grape variety, named after the French Field Marshal Ferdinand Foch.
- Soup Fontanges – the soup of sorrel and peas in consommé with cream and egg yolks is named after Mlle. de Fontanges, Marie Angelique de Scorailles (1659–1681), Louis XIV's mistress between Mme. de Montespan and Mme. de Maintenon.
- Bananas Foster – named after Richard Foster, regular customer and friend of New Orleans restaurant Brennan's owner Owen Brennan, 1951.
- Frangelico – Fra Angelico
- Frangipane – almond pastry filling and tart named for Marquis Muzio Frangipani, a 16th-century Italian of the Frangipane family (also known as Cesar Frangipani) living in Paris. He invented a well-known bitter-almond scented glove perfume, used by Louis XIII.

== G ==
- Green Gage plum or Greengage – Sir William Gage, 7th Baronet (1695–1744) is believed to have brought the plum to England from France around 1725. Knowingly or unknowingly, he renamed the plum that in France was called Reine Claude, after Francis I's wife Claude of Brittany (1499–1524), daughter of Louis XII.
- Galliano (liqueur) – Giuseppe Galliano
- Cherry Garcia ice cream – Ben & Jerry's homage to Grateful Dead leader Jerry Garcia (1942–1995).
- Garibaldi biscuits – English biscuits named for Giuseppe Garibaldi (1807–1882), Italian patriot and leader of the drive to unite Italy, after his wildly popular visit to England in 1864. There is also a French demi-glâce sauce with mustard and anchovies, and a consommé named after him.
- Baron de bœuf à la St. George – a dinner in honor of British guests was probably being held at Delmonico's when Ranhofer named this dish. Saint George, a Roman soldier, was martyred c. 304, and was adopted as England's patron saint in the 13th century. The dinner finished with "Plum Pudding à la St. George."
- Chicken sauté George Sand – George Sand, the pseudonym of French author Amandine-Aurore-Lucile Dupin, Baronne Dudevant (1804–1876), a major figure in mid-19th-century Parisian salons, had several dishes named for her, including fish consommé and sole.
- German chocolate cake – originally known as German's chocolate cake – the 1950s American cake took its name from Baker's German's Sweet Chocolate, which in turn took its name from Sam German who developed the sweet baking chocolate (between milk and semi-sweet) in 1852.
- Graham crackers, Graham flour – Sylvester Graham, 19th-century American Presbyterian minister and proponent of a puritan lifestyle based on teetotalling, vegetarianism, and whole wheat.
- Granny Smith – Granny Smith is an apple originating in Australia from 1868 from a chance seedling propagated by Marie Ana (Granny) Smith, hence the apple is named after her.
- Earl Grey tea – Charles Grey, 2nd Earl Grey, Viscount Howick, and British Prime Minister 1830–1834.
- Lady Grey Tea
- James Grieve apple – an old variety of apple. It gets its name from its breeder, James Grieve, who raised the apple in Edinburgh, Scotland some time before 1893.
- Bombe Grimaldi – kümmel-flavored Bombe glacée, a frozen dessert probably named for a late-19th-century member or relative of Monaco's royal Grimaldi family. There is also an apple flan Grimaldi.
- Gundel palacsinta – Hungarian chef Gundel Károly is credited with inventing some 20 dishes, the best known this crêpe-like pancake stuffed with rum-infused raisins and nuts and served with a chocolate-rum sauce.
- Estomacs de dinde à la Gustave Doré – Gustave Doré (1832–1883) was France's most popular book illustrator of the 19th century. Charles Ranhofer created this dish of turkey in his honor.
- Gustavus Adolphus pastry – named for Swedish King Gustavus Adolphus the Great and eaten every year on his death day, the 6 November, especially in Gothenburg.

== H ==
- Hamantash – a small pastry allegedly named for the hat of the cruel Persian official outwitted by Queen Esther and hanged, Haman, in the Book of Esther. The pastries are traditionally eaten at Purim.
- Hass avocado – in the 1920s, California postal worker Rudolph Hass set out to grow a number of Lyon avocado trees in his backyard. One of the seedlings he bought was a chance variant which produced fruit, his children apparently noticed as unique. Hass patented the variety in 1935, and it now makes up about 75% of U.S. avocado production.
- Heath bar – the American "English toffee" bar is named for brothers Bayard and Everett Heath, Illinois confectioners who developed it in the 1920s and eventually turned the local favorite into a nationally popular candy bar.
- Oh Henry! – the candy bar introduced by the Williamson Candy Company in Chicago, 1920, was named for a young man who frequented the company store and was often commandeered to do odd jobs with that call.
- Hillel Sandwich – a traditional seder food, it consists of horseradish between two pieces of matzot, and was named after the Rabbi Hillel. In temple times, it also contained lamb.
- Hitlerszalonna – a dense fruit jam that was eaten by Hungarian troops and civilians during World War II. Hungarian soldiers received food provisions from the Germans, and it was often fruit flavored jam instead of bacon. So the soldiers started to refer to this jam as the emperor's bacon, and the "emperor" was Adolf Hitler.
- Schnitzel à la Holstein – Baron Friedrich von Holstein (1837–1909), primary German diplomat after Otto von Bismarck, serving Kaiser Wilhelm II. The gourmet Holstein liked to have a variety of foods on one plate, and the original dish consisted of a veal cutlet topped by a fried egg, anchovies, capers, and parsley, and surrounded by small piles of caviar, crayfish tails, smoked salmon, mushrooms, and truffles. Contemporary versions tend to be pared down to the cutlet, egg, anchovies and capers.
- Gâteau Saint-Honoré – pastry named for the French patron saint of bakers, confectioners, and pastry chefs, Saint Honoré or Honorius (died 653), Bishop of Amiens. The pastry chef Chiboust is thought to have invented it in his Paris shop in 1846.
- Hopjes – are a type of Dutch sweets with a slight coffee and caramel flavour that originated in the 18th century. The hopje is named after Baron Hendrik Hop who was recalled as an envoy in Brussels when the French invaded Belgium in 1792. He moved into rooms above the confectioners Van Haaren & Nieuwerkerk. He was addicted to coffee and the story goes that one night he left his coffee with sugar and cream on the heater, where it evaporated. On tasting the resulting substance, he loved it. His doctor advised him not to drink coffee so he asked the confectioner Theodorus van Haaren to make him some "lumps of coffee". After some experimenting, Van Haaren created a sweet made of coffee, caramel, cream and butter.
- Hubbard squash – Elizabeth Hubbard, who talked up the qualities of the heretofore unnamed squash in Marblehead, Massachusetts, in 1842–1843.
- Omelette St. Hubert – the patron saint of hunters, St. Hubert of Liège (656–727), the son of Bertrand, Duke of Aquitane, has several dishes involving game named after him: this omelette with a game purée, tournedos of venison, a consommé, timbales of game meat and truffles, et al. The first bishop of Liège is said to have converted after seeing a stag with a cross in its antlers while he was hunting on a Good Friday.
- Humboldt pudding – Alexander von Humboldt (1769–1859), explorer and influential naturalist, has one of Ranhofer's elaborate molded puddings named after him.

== I ==
- Timbales à la Irving – Washington Irving (1789–1859), the American author, given Charles Ranhofer's penchant for honoring writers with his creations, is the likely source of the name.
- Iskender kebap – its invention is attributed to İskender Efendi who lived in Bursa in the late 19th century.

== J ==
- Coquilles St. Jacques – the French term for scallops, and the Anglo-American term for the popular scallop dish with butter and garlic, owe their name to St. James the Great (died 44 AD), fisherman and first martyred apostle. His major shrine in Santiago de Compostela, Spain, drew pilgrims in quantity from all over Europe. The scallop's shell became an emblem of the pilgrimage as it was used as a water cup along the way, and sewn to the pilgrims' clothes like a badge. The scallop became an emblem of St. James, himself, although the timing is unclear. In Spanish, the scallop has "pilgrims" as part of its name, rather than Santiago.
- Jansson's Temptation – thought to be named after the Swedish opera singer Per Janzon (1844–1889).
- Apricots with rice à la Jefferson – Thomas Jefferson (1743–1826), third U.S. president, is honored appropriately with this Ranhofer dessert and with Jefferson rice, a recently developed strain of Texas rice. Jefferson was very interested in improving American rice culture, to which end he illegally smuggled Piedmont rice out of Italy. During his term as U.S. minister to France, Jefferson found the French preferred the qualities of Italian rice to Carolina rice. On a trip to see Rome, Jefferson stopped in Turin to collect a cache of seeds, and never reached Rome. The rice did reach the U.S.
- Jefferson Davis pie – southern U.S. chess pie named for Jefferson Davis (1808–1889), the only president of the Confederate States of America.
- Jenny Lind melon, Jenny Lind Soup, Oysters and Ham Jenny Lind – Jenny Lind (1820–1887), the "Swedish Nightingale", was already a singing star in Europe when P. T. Barnum convinced her to tour the U.S. Her 1850 visit caused a sensation, and a number of foods were named in her honor.
- Jesse Fish orange – popular 18th-century orange grown by New Yorker Jesse Fish, a.k.a. Joseph Fish (died 1798) before the Revolutionary War on Anastasia Island in Florida.
- Jésus sausage – Jesus has small sausages of the French Basque and Savoy regions named after him. One version is called the Baby Jésus de Lyon.
- Trout, Joan of Arc – the French martyr Joan of Arc (1412–1431) is remembered in this dish by Charles Ranhofer.
- Joffre cake – chocolate ganache cake created at Bucharest's Casa Capșa restaurant, in honor of a visit by French Marshal Joseph Joffre, shortly after World War I.
- John Dory – the English name for a saltwater fish known elsewhere in Europe as Saint Peter's (San Pietro, Saint-Pierre, San Pedro) fish is said to be a reference to Saint Peter's role as "janitor" or doorkeeper at the gates of heaven. Legends claim that spots on the fish are either the fisherman apostle's fingerprints, or a reminder of the coin he found in the fish's mouth—a story from the Gospel of Luke.
- Docteur Jules Guyot pear – 19th-century French agronomist Dr. Jules Guyot, c. 1870. Guyot did work for Napoléon III in several agricultural fields.
- Flounder Jules Janin – Jules Gabriel Janin (1804–1874) was a somewhat eccentric 19th-century French dramatic critic. A good friend of Dumas and Berlioz, Janin wrote several novels; the best known is perhaps The Dead Donkey and the Guillotined Woman.
- Sole Jules Verne – Jules Verne (1828–1905), the French novelist, had several dishes named after him besides this, including a sauce, a garnish, grenades of turkey, breasts of partridge, and meat dishes.

== K ==
- Kaiser rolls – originally, rolls made by a Viennese baker in about 1487 for Holy Roman Emperor Frederick III, whose profile was stamped on top.
- Kaiserschmarrn – the Austrian pancakes were created for Franz Joseph I (1848–1916).
- Poached eggs à la Kapisztrán – Italian lawyer/judge of German parentage, turned Franciscan friar and itinerant preacher, János Kapisztrán (né Capistrano, 1386–1456) became a Hungarian hero at the age of 70 when he helped defeat the Turkish invasion at Belgrade on the direction of Pope Calixtus III. Canonized in 1690, he is also known as St. John Capistran.
- Lady Kennys, also ledikenis – this Bengali sweet of fried chhana balls (a milk-based chickpea-flour dough) stuffed with raisins is named after Lady Charlotte Canning (1817–1861), Lady-in-Waiting to Queen Victoria, and the wife of the Governor-General of India (1856–1862), Lord Charles John Canning. The Cannings were in India during the Indian Rebellion of 1857, and Lady Canning's popularity there is remembered in this sweet which was one of her admitted favorites.
- Chicken à la King – William King of Philadelphia has been credited in 1915 (upon his death) as the inventor of this dish. One theory (without historical evidence) claims that the dish may have been first named "Chicken à la Keene" after James R. Keene, a London-born American staying at London's Claridge's Hotel in 1881 just after his horse had won a major race in Paris. Other stories make claims for an American origin: Delmonico's chef Charles Ranhofer creating the dish for Foxhall P. Keene, James R.'s son, in the early 1890s, or chef George Greenwald making it for Mr. and Mrs. E. Clark King (II or III) at the Brighton Beach Hotel in New York, about 1898. No royalty is involved in any of the stories.
- Kneipp bread – A whole wheat bread, common in Norway, named for Bavarian priest Sebastian Kneipp
- Kossuth Cakes – pastry originating in late-19th-century Baltimore, Maryland, named for Hungarian patriot Lajos Kossuth (1802–1894), leader of the 1848 Hungarian Revolution, who visited the U.S. in 1851–1852.
- Kung Pao chicken (also Kung Po chicken) – Sichuan cuisine dish, named after Ding Baozhen (1820–1886), a late Qing Dynasty official whose title was Gōng Bǎo (宮保; palace guardian).

== L ==
- Crawfish Lafayette en Crêpe – Gilbert du Motier, Marquis de Lafayette (1757–1834), famed French supporter of the American Revolution, is most likely the name source of this New Orleans dish. Lafayette gingerbread was also a popular cake in the 19th-century U.S., with recipes in many cookbooks.
- Dartois Laguipière – Laguipière (c. 1750–1812) an influential French chef and mentor of Antonin Câreme, worked for the noted Condé family, Napoleon, and finally Marshal Joachim Murat, whom he accompanied on Napoleon's invasion of Russia. He died on the retreat from Moscow. This double-eponym savory pastry, filled with sweetbreads and truffles (see Dartois above), is one of many dishes with his name, either his own recipes or those of other chefs commemorating him, including consommé, various sauces, beef tournedos and fish.
- Shrimp Lamaze – developed by chef Johann Lamprecht at Philadelphia's Warwick Hotel. The dish is named after the proprietor of the Warwick Hotel, George Lamaze.
- Lord Lambourne – an apple cultivar developed in England in about 1907 was introduced in 1923, and named after the then-president of the Royal Horticultural Society.
- Lamingtons – these small cakes, considered one of Australia's national foods, are usually considered to be named after Charles Cochrane-Baillie, 2nd Baron Lamington, who was governor of Queensland 1896–1901. There are other interesting claims.
- Lane cake – Named after its inventor Emma Rylander Lane, of Clayton, Alabama, who won first prize with it at the county fair in Columbus, Georgia.
- General Leclerc pear – the French pear developed in the 1950s and introduced in 1974 is named for Jacques-Philippe Leclerc de Hauteclocque (1902–1947), World War II French war hero. General Leclerc, as he was better known, dropped his last name during the Occupation to protect his family.
- Leibniz-Keks – German butter biscuit named for philosopher and mathematician Leibniz
- Li Hongzhang hotchpotch – a stew named after Chinese statesman Li Hongzhang (1823–1901)
- Biff à la Lindström – this Swedish beef dish is thought to be named the man who brought it from Russia to Sweden. Henrik Lindström is said to have been born in St. Petersburg, Russia. Swedish food lore has it that the army officer brought the recipe to the Hotel Witt in Kalmar, Sweden, c. 1862. The beets and capers included may indicate Russian origin or influence.
- Lindy candy bar – Charles Lindbergh (1902–1974), the pioneering aviator who was first to fly solo, non-stop, across the Atlantic, had at least two American candy bars named after him; another – the "Winning Lindy."
- Cream of cardoon soup à la Livingston – David Livingstone (1813–1873), Scottish missionary and explorer has this Delmonico's soup named after him, also available in celery.
- Loganberry – a cross of a blackberry and a raspberry, was accidentally created in 1883 in Santa Cruz, California, by the American lawyer and horticulturist James Harvey Logan.
- Crab Louis – (pronounced Loo-ey) while Louis XIV is often cited as the inspiration because of his notorious fondness for food, The Davenport Hotel (Spokane) in Spokane, Washington claims Louis Davenport is the name source and inventor. Davenport was a Spokane restaurateur from 1889 on, and opened the hotel in 1914. There are several other alleged creators, including Victor Hirtzler (see Celery Victor).
- Macaroni Lucullus – Lucullus (c. 106–56 BC), full name Lucius Licinius Lucullus Ponticus, was perhaps the earliest recorded gastronome in the Western world. After a long spell of wars, the Roman general retired to a life of indulgence and opulence, most evident in his gardens and his cuisine. His name has become associated with numerous dishes of the over-the-top sort, using haute cuisine's favorite luxury staples—truffles, foie gras, asparagus tips, artichoke hearts, sweetbreads, cockscombs, game, Madeira, and so on. Macaroni Lucullus incorporates truffles and foie gras.
- Lussekatter, St. Lucia buns – Swedish saffron buns named for Saint Lucia of Syracuse (283–304), whose name day, December 13, was once considered the longest night of the year. As Lucia means light, the saint was incorporated into the celebration when these buns are traditionally eaten. The Swedish term, Lucia's cats, refers to the bun's curled shape.
- Luther Burger – a hamburger or cheeseburger with one or more glazed doughnuts in place of the bun was allegedly named for and was a favorite (and possible invention) of singer, songwriter and record producer Luther Vandross (1951–2005).
- Dean Lyder – a cocktail which is a variation on the perfect Manhattan. It is made with the usual whiskey and equal parts sweet and dry vermouth, but with added orange bitters and zest, giving it a 'big, bold character'. It is named for Courtney Lyder (born 1966), dean of UCLA School of Nursing.

== M ==
- Chicken Maintenon – a chicken dish made with lemon and toast named for Louis XIV's morganatic wife Mme. de Maintenon.
- Mamie Eisenhower fudge – the wife of U.S. President Dwight D. Eisenhower, Mamie Doud Eisenhower (1896–1979) had this candy named after her when she revealed it was a White House favorite. Mamie Eisenhower was First Lady from 1952 to 1960.
- Mapo tofu – the name Mapo (麻婆) is thought to refer to a (possibly fictional) old pockmarked-face lady by the name of Chen, who invented and sold the dish. It is thus sometimes translated as "Pockmarked-Face Lady's Tofu", or "Pockmarked Mother Chen's Tofu".
- Sole Marco Polo – the renowned explorer and traveler Marco Polo (1254–1324) has this dish of sole with lobster and, somewhat oddly, tomato, named after him.
- À la Maréchale – Marshal's wife style. Usually this term denotes dishes made from tender pieces of meat, such as cutlets, escalopes, supremes, sweetbreads, or fish, which are treated à l'anglais ("English-style"), i.e. coated with eggs and bread crumbs, and sautéed. It is unknown after whom the recipe is named. It is speculated that it could be associated with the Maréchale de Luxembourg (1707–1787), the wife of Charles-François-Frédéric de Montmorency-Luxembourg (1702–1764) and a major society hostess.
- Margarita – there are many claims for the name of this tequila/lime/orange liqueur cocktail. Dallas socialite Margarita Samas said she invented it in 1948 for one of her Acapulco parties. Enrique Bastate Gutierrez claimed he invented it in Tijuana in the 1940s for Rita Hayworth. Hayworth's real name was Margarita Cansino, and another story connects the drink to her during an earlier time when she was dancing in Tijuana nightclubs under that name. Carlos Herrera said he created and named the cocktail in his Tijuana restaurant in 1938–1939 for Marjorie King. Ms. King was reportedly allergic to all alcohol except tequila, and had asked for something besides a straight shot. Around this same general time period, Nevada bartender Red Hinton said he'd named the cocktail after his girlfriend Margarita Mendez. Other stories exist.
- Pizza Margherita – Queen Margherita of Savoy (1851–1926) was presented with this pizza in the colors of the Italian flag on a trip to Naples, c. 1889. Many people claimed to have created it.
- Sole Marguery – Nicholas Marguery (1834–1910), famed French chef, created and named this dish, along with others, for himself and his restaurant Marguery in Paris.
- The Marie biscuit, a type of biscuit similar to a rich tea biscuit also known as María biscuit or Maria cookie (Netherlands), was created by the London bakery Peek Freans in 1874 to commemorate the marriage of the Grand Duchess Maria Alexandrovna of Russia to the Duke of Edinburgh. It became popular throughout Europe, particularly in Spain where, following the Civil War, the biscuit became a symbol of the country's economic recovery after bakeries produced mass quantities to consume a surplus of wheat.
- Chicken Maria Theresia – Maria Theresia (1717–1780), Queen of Hungary and Bohemia, and wife of Emperor Franz I. Coffee Maria Theresia includes cream and orange liqueur.
- Consommé Marie Stuart – Mary Stuart (1542–1587), Queen of Scots, was appropriately Frenchified by Ranhofer in naming this dish. She, herself, had adopted Stuart vs. Stewart while living in France.
- Martha Washington's Cake – Martha Washington (1731–1802), wife of George Washington, is remembered for this fruitcake. Her original recipe for her "Great Cake" called for 40 eggs, 5 pounds of fruit, and similar quantities of other ingredients.
- Bloody Mary – a popular cocktail containing vodka, tomato juice, and usually other spices or flavorings, named after Queen Mary I of England.
- Poires Mary Garden – Mary Garden (1874–1967) was a hugely popular opera singer in Europe and the U.S. at the start of the 20th century. Born in Scotland, she emigrated to the U.S. as a child, then came to Paris in 1897 to complete her training. After her 1900 debut at the Opéra-Comique, she was much sought after by composers for starring roles in their operas. Escoffier made this dish in her honor, and is said to have told a friend once that all his best dishes had been created "for the ladies". (see Melba, Rachel, Réjane, et al. below)
- Mary Jane – peanut butter and molasses candy bars developed by Charles N. Miller in 1914, and named after his favorite aunt.
- Mary Thomas – egg-salad and bacon with thin slice of onion within quality slices of toast. Served at Arnold's Bar and Grill and Mullane's Parkside Cafe, both of Cincinnati.
- Massillon – the small almond pastry is named for noted French bishop and preacher Jean-Baptiste Massillon (1663–1742), a temporary favorite of Louis XIV. The pastry originated in the town of Hyères, where Massillon was born.
- Pâté chaud ris de veau à la McAllister – most likely, Samuel Ward McAllister (1827–1895) is the name source of the hot veal pâté Charles Ranhofer created at Delmonico's. McAllister was best known for his list of the 400 people he considered New York City society.
- McIntosh apple – John McIntosh (1777–1846), American-Canadian farmer who discovered the variety in Ontario, Canada in 1796 or 1811.
- McJordan sandwich – Michael Jordan (1963), The McJordan consisted of a McDonald's Quarter Pounder with bacon and barbecue sauce. It was sold regionally in the Chicago area for a limited time in 1992, at the height of Jordan's career.
- Peach Melba – Dame Nellie Melba (1861–1931). Chef Auguste Escoffier at the Savoy Hotel in 1892 or 1893 heard her sing at Covent Garden and was inspired to create a dessert for her, and which he named after her.
- Melba toast – Dame Nellie Melba (1861–1931), Australian soprano, née Mitchell, took her stage name from her hometown of Melbourne. In 1892–1893, she was living at the Savoy Hotel in London, which was then managed by César Ritz and Auguste Escoffier. During an illness, the singer favored some extremely dry toast which was subsequently named for her. Around this same time, Escoffier created the dessert Peach Melba in her honor. There is also a Melba garnish (raspberry sauce) that is an ingredient of Peach Melba.
- Bisque of shrimps à la Melville – American author Herman Melville (1819–1891)
- Beef tenderloin minions à la Meyerbeer – Giacomo Meyerbeer (1791–1864), the influential 19th-century opera composer, is honored by this dish.
- Mirepoix – carrot and onion mixture used for sauces and garnishes is thought to be named after Gaston Pierre de Lévis, duc de Mirepoix, 18th-century Marshal of France and one of Louis XV's ambassadors.
- Modjeskas – A caramel with a marshmallow inside, named after actress Helena Modjesksa.
- Poulet sauté Montesquieu – culinary tribute to the philosopher and author, Baron de Montesquieu, Charles-Louis de Secondat (1689–1755), major intellect during the French Enlightenment. There is also a frozen dessert, "Plombière Montesquieu."
- Potage anglais de poisson à Lady Morgan – Lady Morgan, née Sydney Owenson (1776–1859), a popular Irish novelist, was visiting Baron James Mayer de Rothschild in 1829, when Câreme created this elaborate fish soup in her honor.
- Mornay sauce – diplomat and writer Philippe de Mornay (1549–1623), a member of Henri IV's court, is often cited as the name source for this popular cheese version of Béchamel sauce. The alternative story is that 19th-century French chef Joseph Voiron invented it and named it after one of his cooks, Mornay, his oldest son.
- Mozartkugel – Salzburg, the birthplace of composer Wolfgang Amadeus Mozart (1756–1791), is also the place where this marzipan/nougat-filled chocolate was created c. 1890. Also in the composer's honor, Ranhofer created "Galantine of pullet à la Mozart" at Delmonico's.
- Lamb cutlets Murillo – Bartolomé Esteban Murillo (1617–1682), the influential Spanish painter, was apparently a favorite artist of Charles Ranhofer.

== N ==
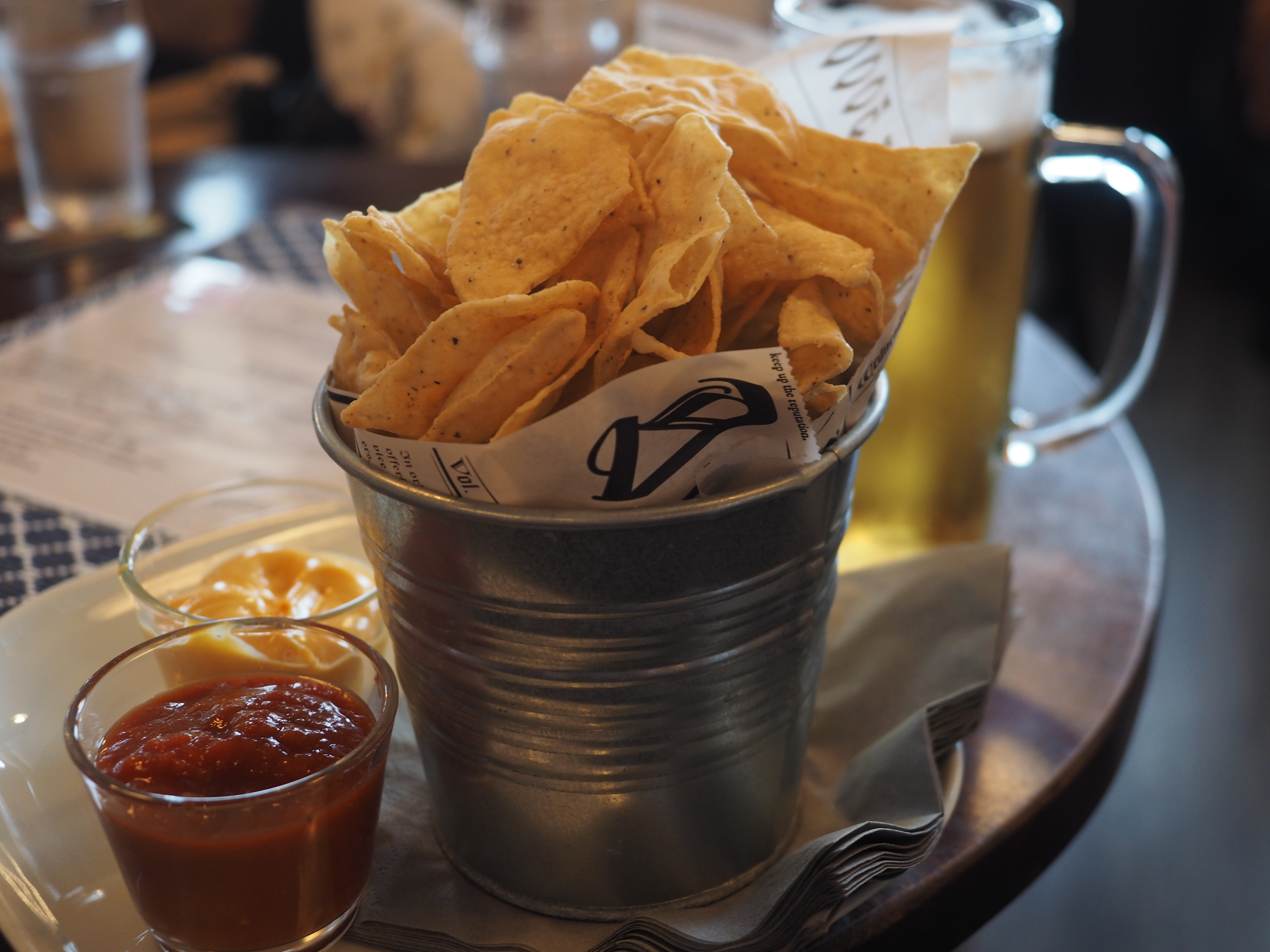
Nachos in a bowl.

- Nachos – first created c. 1943 by Ignacio "Nacho" Anaya, the original nachos consisted of fried corn tortillas covered with melted cheddar cheese and jalapeño peppers.
- Napoleon – an alternate name for mille-feuille, especially in Eastern Europe, commemorating the French invasion of Russia.
- Napoleon Brandy – a sort of brandy named for the Emperor Napoleon.
- Bigarreau Napoleon cherry – unlike the pastry, the French cherry was most likely named after the Emperor Napoleon, his son Napoleon II, or his nephew Napoleon III. The sweet, white-fleshed (bigarreau) cherry often used in maraschino cherry production fell into the hands of Oregon's Seth Luelling of Bing cherry fame (the Napoleon is a forebear of the Bing), and he renamed it the Royal Anne. Subsequently, the cherry also became known as the Queen Anne cherry in North America.
- Lord Nelson apple – Admiral Horatio Nelson (1758–1805), British hero of the Battle of Trafalgar. Nelson also has a dish of mutton cutlets named after him, as well as an early-19th-century boiled sweet (or hard candy) somewhat indelicately called "Nelson's balls".
- Nesselrode Pudding – Russian diplomat Count Karl Robert von Nesselrode (1780–1862) had several dishes named for him, usually containing chestnuts, like this iced dessert.
- Lobster Newberg – variously spelled Newburg and Newburgh, and now applied to other seafood besides lobster, this dish is usually attributed to a Captain Ben Wenberg, who brought the recipe he had supposedly found in his travels to Delmonico's in the late 19th century. The chef, Charles Ranhofer, reproduced the dish for him and put it on the restaurant menu as Lobster Wenberg. Allegedly, the two men had a falling-out, Ranhofer took the dish off the menu, and returned it, renamed, only at other customers' insistence.
- Marshal Ney – the elaborate Ranhofer dessert—molded tiers of meringue shells, vanilla custard, and marzipan—is named after Napoleon's Marshal Michel Ney (1769–1815), who led the retreat from Moscow and was a commander at Waterloo.

== O ==
- Potatoes O'Brien – possibly William Smith O'Brien (1803–1864), who led the Irish revolt subsequent to the Great Famine of Ireland is the source of the name.
- Bath Oliver biscuits – Dr William Oliver (1695–1764) of Bath, England concocted these as a digestive aid for his patients. Oliver had opened a bath for the treatment of gout, and was largely responsible for 18th-century Bath becoming a popular health resort.
- Salade Olivier – a salad composed of diced vegetables and sometimes meat, bound in mayonnaise, invented in the 1860s by Lucien Olivier, the chef of the Hermitage Restaurant in Moscow.
- Œufs sur le plat Omer Pasha – the Hungarian-Croatian Mihailo Latas known as Omer Pasha Latas (1806–1871), commander-in-chief of Turkish forces allied with the French and English during the Crimean War had this sort of Hungarian/Turkish dish of eggs named for him. In the U.S., Ranhofer made a dish of hashed mutton Omer Pasha, as well as eggs on a dish.
- Veal Prince Orloff – Count Gregory Orloff, paramour of tzarina Catherine the Great is often cited. Much more likely, Urbain Dubois, noted 19th-century French chef, created the dish for his veal-hating employer Prince Nicolas Orloff, minister to tzar Nicolas I, hence the multiple sauces and seasonings. Stuffed pheasant à la Prince Orloff was created by Charles Ranhofer.
- Veal Oscar – Sweden's King Oscar II (1829–1907) The dish was first served at Restaurant Operakällaren, Stockholm, Sweden in 1897 in conjunction with the world fair. It was composed by the French mâitre de cuisine of the Operakällaren restaurant, Paul Edmond Malaise, for the 25th anniversary of the accession of King Oscar II to the throne. Choron sauce that has the color of red as the same as the kings royal mantle is piped in the shape of an "O" around a slice of fried fillet of veal. On top the fillet, a white slice of lobster tail and a slice of black truffle are placed to symbolize the black and white outer trimming on the royal mantle and you create King Oscar's crowned monogram. This is topped with two white sticks of asparagus, forming a Roman number two as for the number of the king being Oscar the 2nd. Contemporary versions may substitute chicken and crab.
- Oysters Rockefeller – a cooked hors d'ouervre identified with New Orleans, it is named after John D. Rockefeller
- Osmania Biscuit – biscuit named after Mir Osman Ali Khan, the last Nizam of Hyderabad

== P ==
- Selle d'agneau à la Paganini – Niccolò Paganini (1782–1840), Italian opera composer and brilliant violinist, has this lamb dish named after him, probably by Charles Ranhofer.
- Parsnips Molly Parkin – Molly Parkin, Welsh artist and novelist. The dish, comprising parsnip, cream, tomatoes and cheese, was created for her by the food writer Denis Curtis in the 1970s.

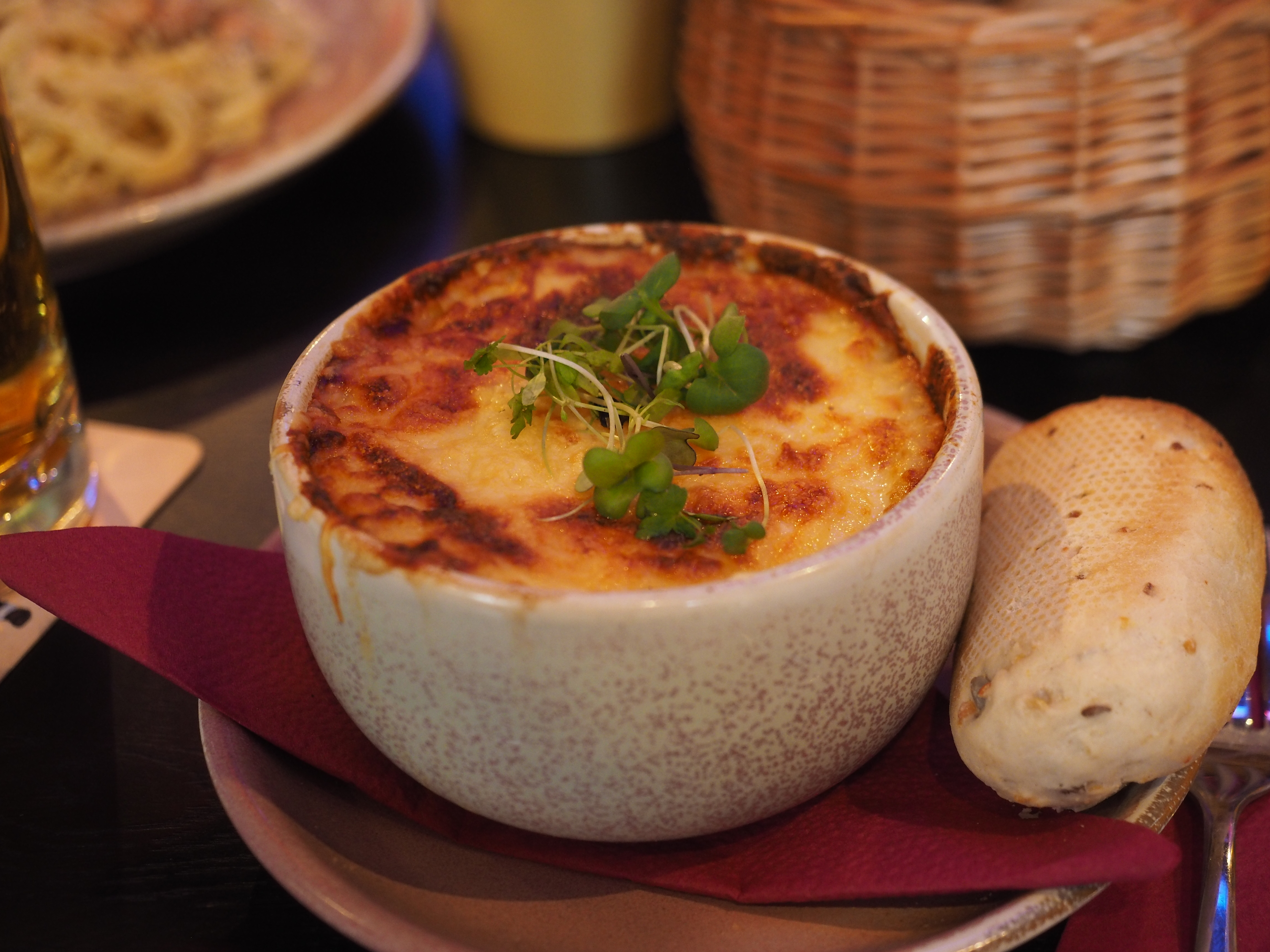
Hachis Parmentier.

- Potatoes Parmentier – Antoine-Augustin Parmentier (1737–1817), chief proponent in reversing the French public view about the once-despised potato. Parmentier discovered the food value of the vegetable while a prisoner of war in Germany, where the potato had already been accepted.
- Pastilles – Giovanni Pastilla, Italian confectioner to Marie de' Medici, is said to have accompanied her to Paris on her marriage to Henri IV, and created some form of the tablets named after him there.
- Lobster Paul Bert – Paul Bert (1833–1886) was a French physiologist, diplomat, and politician, but is perhaps best known for his research on the effect of air pressure on the body. Charles Ranhofer was either a friend or fan of the father of aerospace medicine.
- Pavlova – Anna Pavlova (1881–1931), Russian ballerina. Both Australia and New Zealand have claimed to be the source of the meringue ("light as Pavlova") and fruit dessert.
- Pedro Ximenez – a Vinifera grape, named after the soldier who allegedly brought it to Spain.
- Dr Pepper – Charles T. Pepper. The soft drink invented by pharmacist Charles Alderton in 1885 at a Waco, Texas drugstore owned by Wade Morrison is said to be named for Morrison's first employer, who owned a pharmacy in Virginia.
- Dom Pérignon (wine) – Dom Pérignon (1638–1715), (Pierre) a French Benedictine monk, expert winemaker and developer of the first true champagne in the late 17th century.
- Petre Roman cake – marshmallow and vanilla cream cake named after Petre Roman, the first Prime Minister of Romania after the 1989 revolution.
- Eggs Picabia – Named by Gertrude Stein in her The Alice B. Toklas Cookbook after Francis Picabia (22 January 1879 – 30 November 1953) and his recipe.
- Chicken Picasso – this creamy chicken dish was named after Pablo Picasso.
- Sole Picasso – this fruity fish was named after Pablo Picasso. The dish consists of fried or grilled sole and warm fruit in a ginger-lemon sauce.
- Pio Quinto – this Nicaraguan dessert was named after Pope Pius V.
- Pizza Di Rosso – pizza topped with sliced tomatoes, black olives, mozzarella, eggplant and capsicum. Named after Count Enrico Di Rosso who selected the ingredients to create this variety of vegetarian pizza the colours of which resemble the red and white of the Order of St. George of which the Count is Patron.
- Pozharsky cutlet (or Pojarski) – Pozharsky family were innkeepers in Torzhok, Russia. Darya Pozharskaya was favored by Tsar Nicholas I for her version of minced veal and chicken cutlets. An especially juicy and tender consistency was achieved by adding butter to minced meat. The originals were reformed on veal chop or chicken wing bones, respectively, for presentation.
- Rissoles Pompadour – Jeanne Poisson, the Marquise de Pompadour (1721–1764), official paramour of Louis XV from 1745 until her death, has had many dishes named after her besides these savory fried pastries. Mme. Pompadour's interest in cooking is remembered with lamb, sole, chicken, beef, pheasant, garnishes, croquettes, cakes and desserts, created by a number of chefs during and after her life.
- Praline – César de Choiseul, Count du Plessis-Praslin (1598–1675), by his officer of the table Lassagne, presented at the court of Louis XIII. The caramelized almond confection was transformed at some point in Louisiana to a pecan-based one. This praline has gone on to be known by another eponym in the U.S.: Aunt Bill's Brown Candy. Aunt Bill's identity is apparently unknown.
- Princess cake – three Swedish princesses, Margaretha (later Princess of Denmark), Märtha (later Crown Princess of Norway), and Astrid (later Queen of the Belgians).
- Prinzregententorte – Luitpold, Prince Regent of Bavaria
- Toronchino Procope – Charles Ranhofer named this ice cream dessert after the Sicilian Francesco Procopio dei Coltelli, whose Café Procope, opening in Paris in 1686, introduced flavored ices to the French.

== Q ==
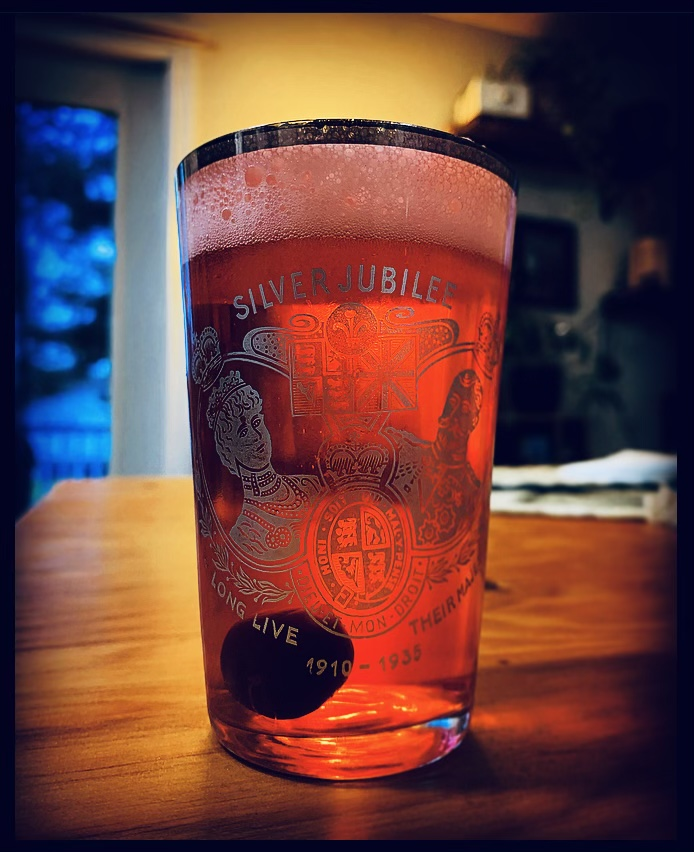
A Queen Mary cocktail: beer, grenadine and maraschino cherries

- Queen of Puddings – though it is unclear which Queen it was named after, it became famous in the early 20th century, possibly linking it to Queen Victoria.
- Queen Mary (beer cocktail) – a mix of beer and grenadine, named after Queen Mary of Teck.
- Queen Mother's Cake – in the 1950s, Queen Elizabeth The Queen Mother (1901–2002) was served this flourless chocolate cake by her friend Jan Smeterlin (1892–1967), well-known Polish pianist. Smeterlin had acquired the recipe in Austria, and the Queen Mother's fondness for the cake produced its name, via either Smeterlin, food writer Clementine Paddleford or dessert maven Maida Heatter.
- Queen of Sheba cake – the originally French gâteau de la reine Saba, a chocolate cake, is named for the 10th-century-BC African Queen of Sheba, guest of King Solomon of Israel.

== R ==
- Lamprey à la Rabelais – François Rabelais (c. 1484–1553), French monk, turned physician, turned famed writer and satirist, was honored in this dish by Delmonico's chef Charles Ranhofer.
- Tournedos Rachel – from singing in the streets of Paris as a child, Swiss-born Elisa-Rachel Félix (1821–1858) went on to become known as the greatest French tragedienne of her day. Her stage name Rachel is used for a number of dishes—consommé, eggs, sweetbreads, et al.—many created by Escoffier. In New York City, Charles Ranhofer created "artichokes à la Rachel" in her honor.
- Ramos Gin Fizz – Henry C. Ramos, New Orleans bartender, created this cocktail c. 1888, at either Meyer's Restaurant or the Imperial Cabinet Saloon, and named it after himself.
- Chicken Raphael Weill – Raphael Weill (1837–1920) arrived in San Francisco from France at the age of 18. Within a few years he had founded what was to be one of California's largest department stores. Later he helped found the well-known Bohemian Club, which still exists. He liked to cook, and is remembered in San Francisco restaurants with this dish.
- Reggie Bar – Reggie Jackson (born 1946), American baseball player of the 1970s, had this now-discontinued candy bar named for him.
- Salad Réjane – Gabrielle Réjane was the stage name for Gabrielle-Charlotte Reju (1856–1920), a French actress at the start of the 20th century. Escoffier named several dishes for her, including consommé, sole, and œufs à la neige.
- Reuben sandwich – possibly Reuben Kolakofsky (1874–1960) made it for a poker group gathered at his restaurant in an Omaha, Nebraska hotel c. 1925, or Arnold Reuben, a New York restaurateur (1883–1970), may have created and named it c. 1914.
- Rigó Jancsi – the Viennese chocolate and cream pastry is named after the Gypsy violinist, Rigó Jancsi (by Hungarian use, Rigó is his last name, Jancsi his first, called literally 'Blackbird Johnny'). He is perhaps best known for his part in one of the great late-19th-century society scandales. In 1896, Clara Ward, Princesse de Caraman-Chimay. The Princesse de Chimay saw the charming Rigó Jancsi, first violinist playing Hungarian Gypsy music in a Paris restaurant in 1896 while dining with her husband, Prince de Chimay. She ran off with Rigó, married him, divorced him, and later married two other men too.
- Robert E. Lee Cake – southern U.S. lemon layer cake named for American Civil War General Robert E. Lee (1807–1870).
- Strawberries Romanoff – although there are a number of claimants for the creation of this dish, including the Hollywood restaurateur self-styled "Prince Michael Romanoff", credit is most often given to Marie-Antoine Carême, when he was chef to tzar Alexander I around 1820. Romanoff was the house name of the Russian rulers.
- Ronald Reagan's Hamburger Soup – Ronald Reagan, while President, had this recipe issued publicly in 1986, after he had gotten flak for saying he liked French soups.
- Ross Sauce – a multipurpose barbecue sauce invented by Scott Ross in Habersham County, Georgia. Scott Ross, a high school chemistry teacher and wrestling coach, says that his sauce "goes great on anything" suggesting salad, popcorn, and almost anything but meats.
- Tournedos Rossini – Gioacchino Rossini (1792–1868), Italian composer known almost as well as a gastronome. A friend of Carême, Prince Metternich, et al., Rossini had many dishes named for him: eggs, chicken, soup, salad, cannelloni, sole, risotto, pheasant, and more. Escoffier was responsible for many of these. Charles Ranhofer created "Meringued pancakes à la Rossini."
- Soufflé Rothschild – a dessert soufflé created by Marie-Antoine Carême for Baron James Mayer de Rothschild (1792–1868) and Baroness Betty de Rothschild (1805–1886) in the 1820s. The Baron was a notable French banker and diplomat. It was originally flavoured with Goldwasser but is now flavoured with a variety of other liqueurs and spirits including kirsch. This dessert was a favourite of Her Majesty Queen Elizabeth the Queen Mother (1900–2002).
- Roy Rogers – a non-alcoholic mixed drink made with cola and grenadine syrup, named after actor Roy Rogers (1911–1998).
- Rumford's Soup – Benjamin Thompson, Count Rumford
- Runeberg torte (Runebergintorttu / Runebergstårta) – named after the Finnish poet Johan Ludvig Runeberg (1804–1877) and his wife, writer Fredrika Runeberg (1807–1879), who invented the pastry. Johan Ludvig Runeberg's birthday, 5 February, is in Finland Runeberg-day and it is celebrated with this almond-pastry. There is also a variation of this called the Fredrika-pastry.
- Baby Ruth candy bar – most likely, Babe Ruth (1895–1948) was the inspiration for the name. Although the Curtiss Candy Co. has insisted from the beginning that the candy bar was named after a daughter of Grover Cleveland, Ruth Cleveland died in 1904 at the age of 12, while the Baby Ruth was introduced in 1921 right at a time when George Herman Ruth, Jr. had become a baseball superstar. Very early versions of the wrapper offer a baseball glove for 79 cents. Babe Ruth's announced intent to sue the company is probably what drove and perpetuated the dubious cover story.

== S ==
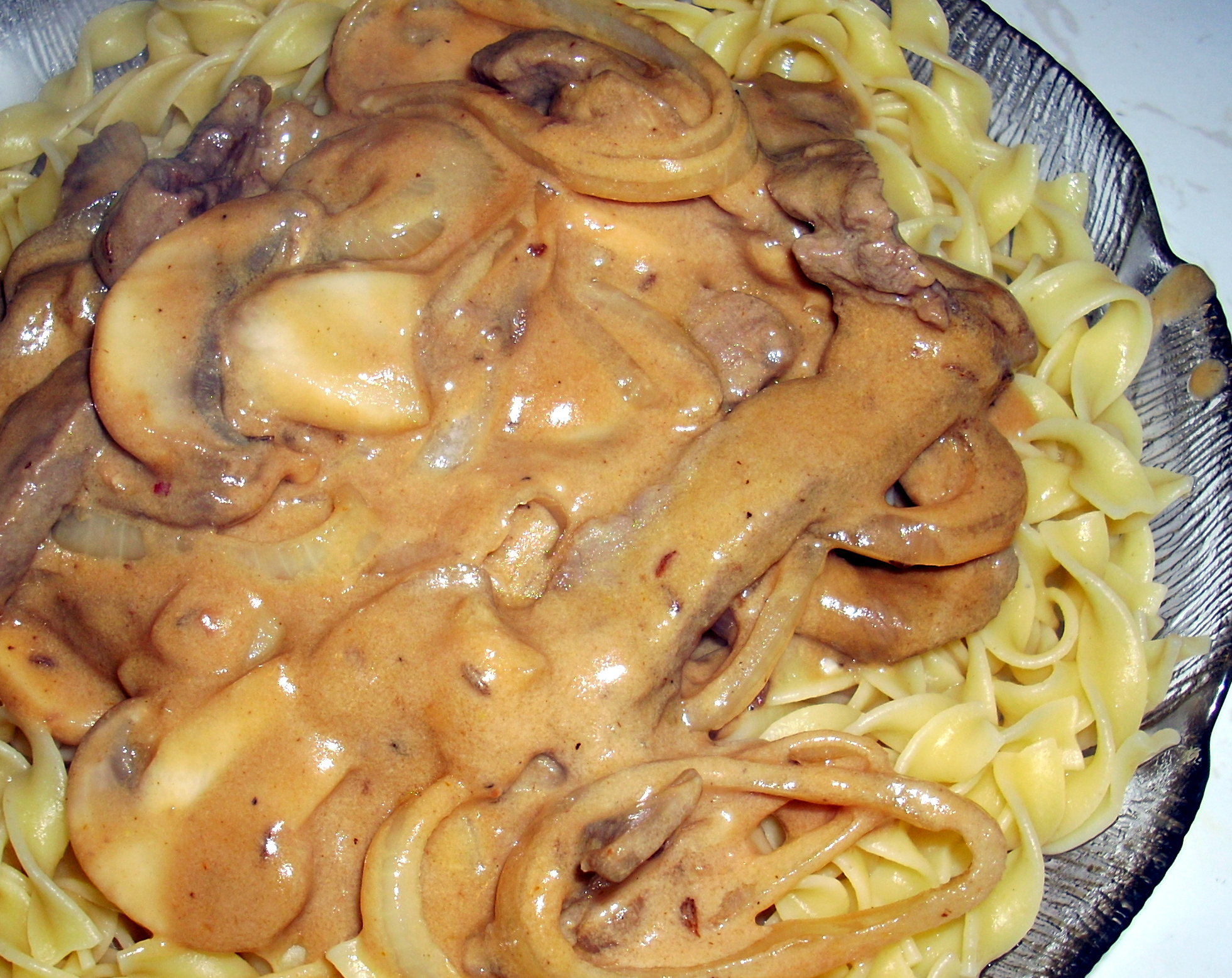
Beef Stroganoff served atop pasta

- Sachertorte – Franz Sacher, Vienna, 1832, working for Prince Metternich.
- Chicken filets Sadi Carnot – chef Charles Ranhofer almost certainly had French President Marie François Sadi Carnot (1837–1894) in mind, not his uncle, the physicist Nicolas Léonard Sadi Carnot (1796–1832).
- Flan Sagan – see Talleyrand below. Charles Maurice de Talleyrand-Périgord held the title of Prince of Żagań. This flan of truffles, mushrooms, and calves' brains was one of several Sagan-named dishes, usually involving brains, including a garnish and scrambled eggs.
- Salisbury steak – James H. Salisbury (1823–1905), early U.S. health food advocate, created this dish and advised his patients to eat it three times a day, while limiting their intake of "poisonous" vegetables and starches.
- Beef hash Sam Ward – Samuel Cutler Ward (1814–1884) was perhaps the most influential Washington lobbyist of the mid-19th century. He was as well known for his entertaining as his political work, apparently agreeing with Talleyrand that dining well was essential to diplomacy. Why Ranhofer named a beef hash after him is open to speculation.
- Sandwich – John Montagu, 4th Earl of Sandwich (1718–1792) did not invent the sandwich. Meat between slices of bread had been eaten long before him. But as the often-repeated story goes, his title name was applied to it c. 1762, after he frequently called for the easily handled food while entertaining friends. Their card games then were not interrupted by the need for forks and such.
- Sarah Bernhardt Cakes – French actress Sarah Bernhardt (1844–1923). The pastry may be Danish in origin. There is a Sole Sarah Bernhardt, and a soufflé. "Sarah Bernhardt" may indicate a dish garnished with a purée of foie gras, and Delmonico's "Sarah Potatoes", by Charles Ranhofer, are most likely named for the actress.
- Eggs Sardou – Invented at the New Orleans restaurant Antoine's and named after the French dramatist Victorien Sardou
- Schillerlocken – two quite distinct foods named after the curly hair of the German poet Friedrich von Schiller (1759–1805). One is cream-filled puff pastry cornets; the other is long strips of smoked dogfish belly flaps. Ranhofer named a dessert of pancakes rolled up, sliced, and layered in a mold Schiller pudding.
- Seckel pear – although little is known about the origin of this American pear, it is generally believed that a Pennsylvania farmer named Seckel discovered the fruit in the Delaware River Valley near Philadelphia, in the 18th or early 19th century.
- Lobster cutlets à la Shelley – Percy Bysshe Shelley (1792–1822), the great English poet, drowned off the coast of Italy. Charles Ranhofer remembered him with this.
- Shirley Temple – the classic children's cocktail of club soda, grenadine, and a maraschino cherry was invented in the late 1930s at Hollywood's Chasen's restaurant for the child star Shirley Temple (1928–2014). A slice of orange and a straw is suggested; the paper parasol is optional.
- Reinette Simirenko – an apple variety discovered by Ukrainian pomologist Lev Simirenko in his garden and named after his father Platon Simirenko. The origin of this cultivar is unclear. It was one of the most widely grown apple varieties in the Soviet Union.
- Veal Sinatra – a veal stuffed with a buttery cream sauce, vegetables, meat and/or seafood named after the famous jazz singer Frank Sinatra
- Soubise sauce – the onion purée or béchamel sauce with added onion purée is probably named after the 18th-century aristocrat Charles de Rohan, Prince de Soubise, and Marshal of France.
- Eggs Stanley – Sir Henry Morton Stanley (1841–1904), the famed British explorer, has several dishes named for him, usually with onions and a small amount of curry seasoning. A recipe for these poached eggs has a sauce with 1/2 tsp (3 mL) of curry powder.
- Beef Stroganoff – a 19th-century Russian dish, named for a Count Stroganov (possibly Count Pavel Alexandrovich Stroganov or Count Grigory Dmitriyevich Stroganov)
- Sukjunamul – Sin Sukchu
- Crepes Suzette – said to have been created for then-Prince of Wales Edward VII on 31 January 1896, at the Café de Paris in Monte Carlo. When the prince ordered a special dessert for himself and a young female companion, Henri Charpentier, then 16 (1880–1961), produced the flaming crepe dish. Edward reportedly asked that the dessert be named after his companion (Suzette) rather than himself. However, Larousse disputes Charpentier's claim.

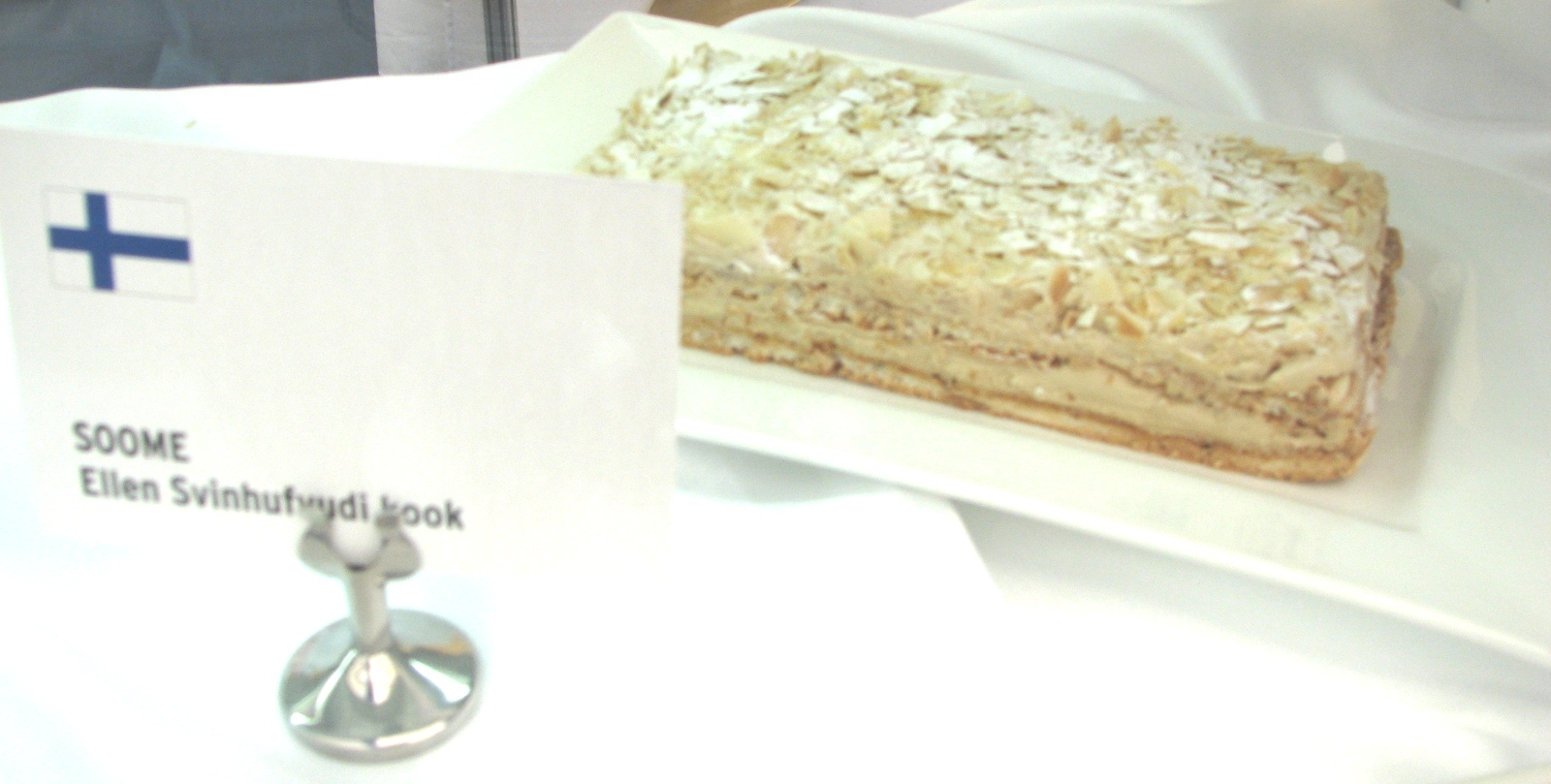
A slice of Ellen Svinhufvud cake

- Ellen Svinhufvud cake – named in 1930s after Ellen Svinhufvud (1869–1953), the wife of President of Finland Pehr Evind Svinhufvud.
- Sydney Smith's salad dressing – Salad dressing named after founder of the Edinburgh Review, Sydney Smith (1771–1845). He was a clergyman who wrote a poem which describes how to make this salad. Popular in the 19th century among American cooks.

== T ==
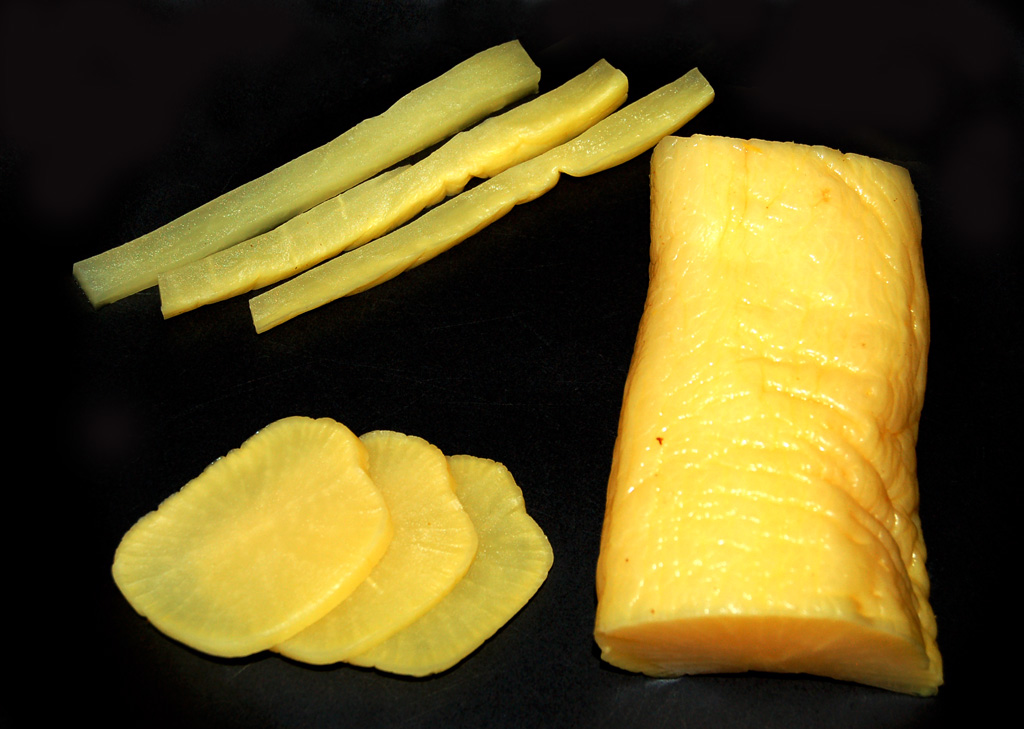
Takuan

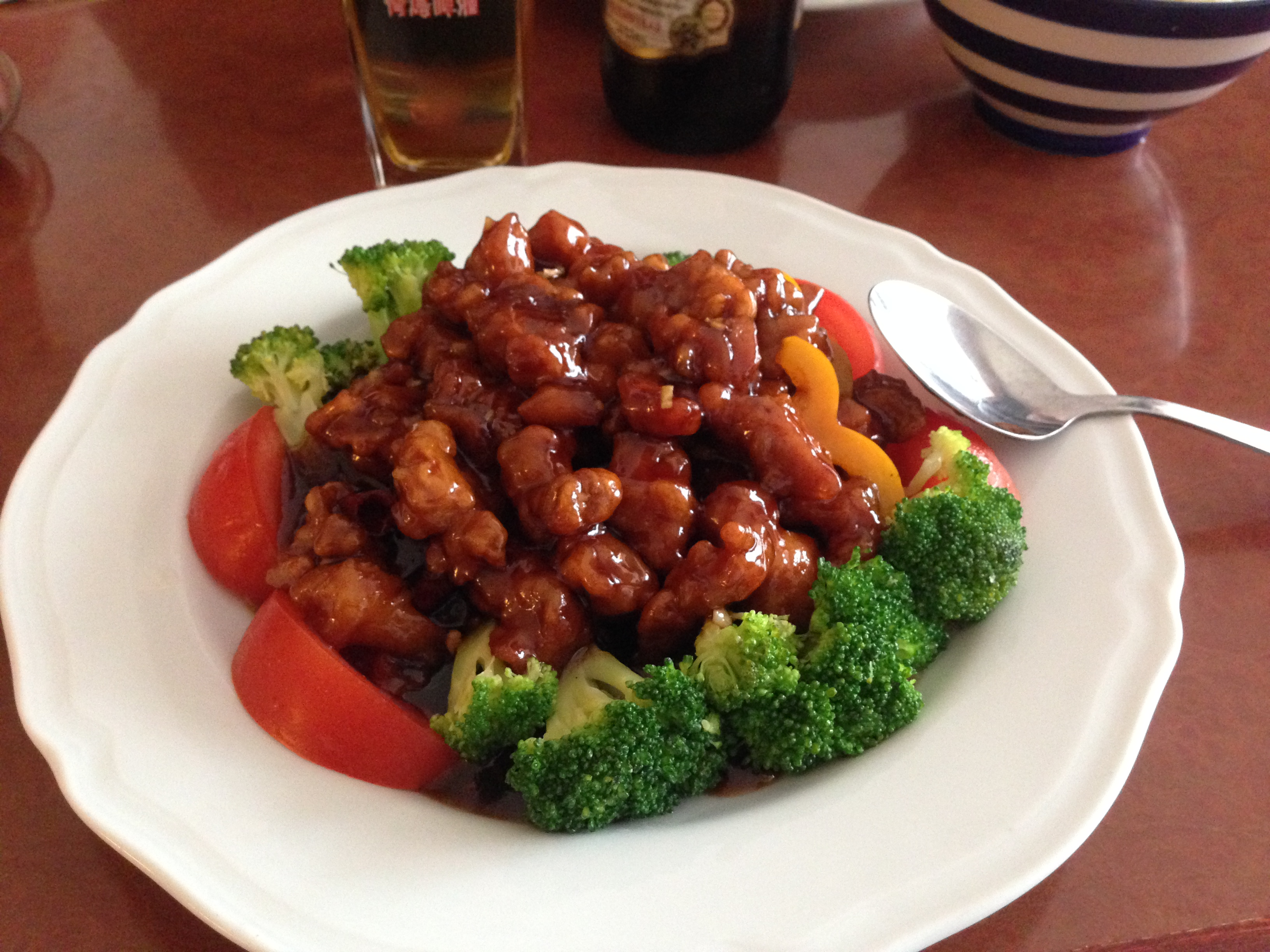
General Tso's chicken

- Takuan – named after Takuan Sōhō, it is pickled daikon radish
- Talleyrand – a pineapple savarin is one of many dishes named for the epicurean French statesman Charles Maurice de Talleyrand-Périgord (1754–1838). An influential negotiator at the Congress of Vienna, Talleyrand considered dining a major part of diplomacy. Antonin Câreme worked for him for a time, and Talleyrand was instrumental in furthering his career. The host's eponymous dishes include sauces, tournedos, veal, croquettes, orange fritters, et al.
- Tarte Tatin – Stephine Tatin (1838–1917) and Caroline Tatin (1847–1911). In French, the tarte is known as à la Demoiselles Tatin for the sisters who ran the Hotel Tatin in Lamotte-Beuvron, France. Stephine allegedly invented the upside-down tart accidentally in the fall of 1898, but the pastry may be much older.
- Beef Tegetthoff – Admiral Wilhelm von Tegetthoff (1827–1871), Austrian naval hero, is celebrated by this beef dish with seafood ragoût.
- Chicken Tetrazzini – named for operatic soprano Luisa Tetrazzini, the "Florentine Nightingale" (1871–1941), and created in San Francisco.
- Tootsie Rolls – Clara "Tootsie" Hirshfield, the small daughter of Leo Hirshfield, developer of the first paper-wrapped penny candy, in New York, 1896.
- Biscuit Tortoni – the Italian Tortoni, working at the Café Velloni which had opened in Paris in 1798, bought the place and renamed it the Café Tortoni. It became a very successful restaurant and ice cream parlor in the 19th century. This ice cream dish is said to be one of his creations.
- General Tso's chicken – Named for General Zuǒ Zōngtáng (1812–1885; variously spelled Tzo, Cho, Zo, Zhou, etc.) of the Qing Dynasty, although it was not contemporaneous with him.

== U ==
- Chicken Soup Ujházi – said to have been made of rooster originally, this soup was the creation of amateur chef and well-known Hungarian actor Ede Ujházi c. 1900.
- Cases of squabs Umberto – Umberto I (1844–1900), king of Italy and husband of pizza's Queen Margherita, has this Delmonico's dish by Ranhofer named after him.

== V ==
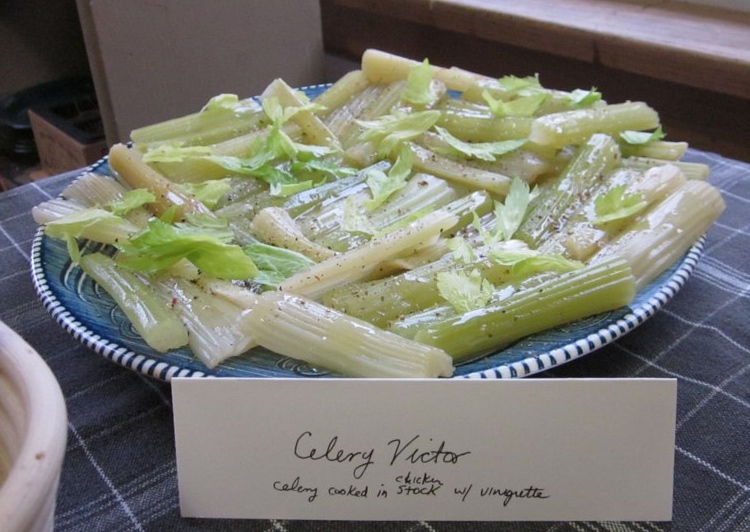
Celery Victor

- Purée of wild ducks van Buren – Martin van Buren (1782–1862), 8th president of the United States, developed a taste for French cuisine while a minister in London, where he became acquainted with Talleyrand's dining philosophy. During his presidency, White House dinners were even more French than in Jefferson's day. Ranhofer may have been returning the compliment with this soup.
- Van Gogh potato – artist Vincent van Gogh (1853–1890) is commemorated by this potato developed in the Netherlands in 1976.
- Soupe aux truffes noires VGE – dedicated to Valéry Giscard d'Estaing (abbreviated VGE) and created by Paul Bocuse in 1975.
- Fillets of Brill Véron – Dr. Louis Désiré Véron (1798–1867) gave up his Parisian medical practice for the more fashionable life as a writer, manager of the Opera, paramour of the actress Rachel, political influence, and pre-eminent host of lavish dinners for the elite. Véron sauce accompanies the brill.
- Celery Victor – Victor Hirtzler, (c. 1875–1935) well-known American chef from Strasbourg, France considered this braised celery dish one of his two best recipes, the other being Sole Edward VII. Both dishes were created at San Francisco's St. Francis Hotel, where Hirtzler was head chef from 1904 to 1926. His 1919 cookbook can be seen in full at Hotel St. Francis Cookbook.
- Lamb chops Victor Hugo – the renowned French author, Victor Hugo (1802–1885), is commemorated with these, and with fillets of plover.
- Victoria plum and Victoria Sponge or Sandwich Cake – Queen Victoria (1819–1901). Many dishes are named for the British Queen, including sole, eggs, salad, a garnish, several sauces, a cherry spice cake, a bombe, small tarts, et al. There is also a Victoria pea and a Victoria apple.
- Vidal blanc – a hybrid grape variety, named after its breeder, Jean-Louis Vidal

== W ==
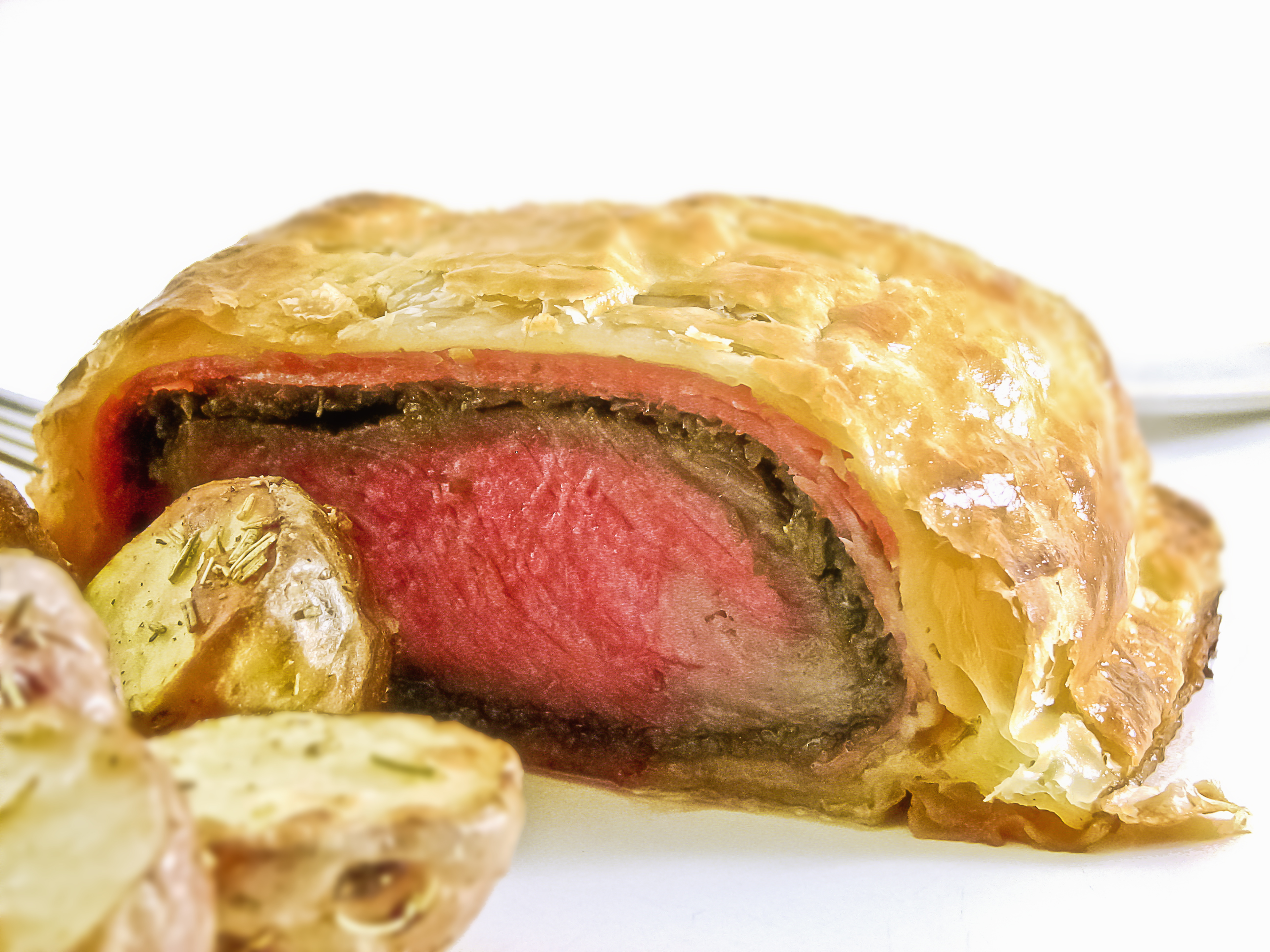
A cross-section view of a Beef Wellington sliced open

- Waldorf salad – salad made at the Waldorf hotel originally as a joke for a particularly persnickety patron.
- Wallenberg Steak – Scandinavian dish of minced veal named after the prominent and wealthy Swedish Wallenberg family. Contemporary versions use turkey and moose meat.
- Wild Duckling à la Walter Scott – dish named for the Scottish writer Walter Scott (1771–1832) includes Dundee marmalade and whisky.
- Pears Wanamaker – of the Philadelphia merchant Wanamaker family, Rodman Wanamaker (1863–1928) seems most likely to be the inspiration for this dish. The son of John Wanamaker, founder of the family business, Rodman Wanamaker went to Paris in 1889 to oversee the Paris branch of their department store. When he returned to the U.S. in 1899, he kept his Paris home and contacts.
- Washington pie – George Washington (1732–1799), first U.S. president, has this cake named after him, as well as a French sauce or garnish containing corn.
- Beef Wellington – Arthur Wellesley, 1st Duke of Wellington (1769–1852), British hero of the Battle of Waterloo, has this dish of beef with pâté, mushrooms, truffles and Madeira sauce, all encased in a pastry crust, named after him. It was probably created by his personal chef. Theories vary: either the Duke had no sense of taste and didn't care what he was eating (leaving his chef to his own devices), or he loved the dish so much that it had to be served at every formal dinner, or the shape of the concoction resembles the Wellington boot.
- Lobster Wenberg – see Lobster Newberg.
- Wibele – Jakob Christian Carl Wibel, he invented this sweet pastry in 1763
- Fraises Wilhelmine – A dessert of strawberries, macerated in orange juice, powdered sugar and kirsch, served with Crème Chantilly, created by Auguste Escoffier and named after Queen Wilhelmina of the Netherlands. Wilhelmina Pepermunt, a Dutch peppermint candy, is also named after her.
- Prince William Cider Apple – Created to celebrate the 21st birthday of Prince William. It was named the "Prince William" after he said in an interview that he was a cider drinker. Large, robust yet mild in nature with a red flush and will make a cider of fair complexion, well balanced with much character. The "Prince William" will be the first of more than 360 varieties of traditional English cider apples grown over the centuries to be given a royal name.
- Fillets à la Peg Woffington – Peg Woffington, Irish actress (1720–1760). A recipe exists for "Woffington Sauce" for fish, and also for an orange-based sweet, Corbeilles à la Peg Woffington.
- Eggs Woodhouse – Named after Woodhouse, long suffering valet of Sterling Archer in the animated sitcom Archer. It is a variation of Eggs Benedict, with the main differences being the addition of artichoke hearts, creamed spinach, bechamel sauce, Ibérico ham, black truffle and beluga caviar.
- Woolton pie – Frederick Marquis, 1st Earl of Woolton. Lord Woolton was the British Minister of Food during World War II. This root vegetable pie created by the chefs at London's Savoy Hotel marked Woolton's drive to get people to eat more vegetables instead of meat.

== X ==
- Potage à la Xavier – this cream soup with chicken has at least two stories associated with its name. Some sources say that King Louis XVIII (1755–1824), a noted gourmand, invented the soup when he was Comte de Provence, and known as Louis Stanislas Xavier de France. Others suggest the soup was named after Francis Xavier (1506–1552), a Basque missionary to Goa and India.

== Y ==
- Yemas de Santa Theresa de Ávila – these sweets made from lemon-flavoured candied egg yolks from the Spanish city of Ávila are named after its Saint, Theresa of Ávila.

== Food-related ==
- Pasteurization – Louis Pasteur

== See also ==
- List of words derived from toponyms
- List of foods and drinks named after places
- Lists of etymologies

== Bibliography ==
- Bickel, Walter (1989). Hering's Dictionary of Classical and Modern Cookery (eleventh ed.). London: Virtue. ISBN 978-3-8057-0307-9.
- Gilbar, S. (2008). Chicken A La King And The Buffalo Wing: Food Names And The People And Places That Inspired Them. F+W Media. ISBN 978-1-58297-525-2.
