= Alexandertorte =

Dessert of European origin

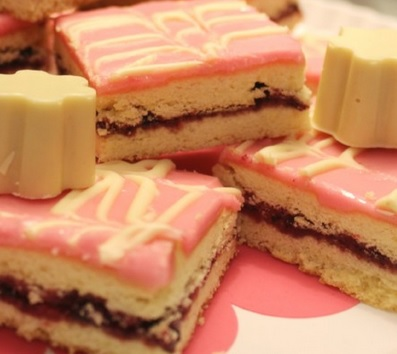
- Alternative names: Alexander Torte, Aleksander Torte
- Type: Pastry
- Course: Dessert
- Place of origin: Russian Empire, see Origin
- Main ingredients: Pastry dough, raspberry preserves

Best known by its German name, Alexandertorte (Note: Alternative spellings include Alexander Torte and Aleksander Torte.) (Finnish: aleksanterinleivos, aleksanterintorttu, Latvian: Aleksandra kūka, Aleksandra torte, Estonian: Aleksandrikook) is a cake that consists of pastry strips filled with raspberry preserves or raspberry jam.

It is traditionally eaten as a dessert after lunch or dinner, but it can also be served at tea time. It should be made a day or so before it is planned to serve, because the icing must be hard before the cake is cut. In German speaking Europe, the Alexandertorte is made with almonds and wineberries.

A slice of Hindbærsnitte, which varies by having white icing and sprinkles

A similar dessert exists in Denmark and is known as hindbærsnitte (lit. 'raspberry slice'). The pink slice, an English pastry from Sunderland, is also similarly prepared by filling two layers of shortbread with jam, which is then topped with pink icing.

== Origin ==
According to Finnish tradition, the dessert has been made since 1818 in memory of Alexander I, the first Russian Emperor to rule Finland.

According to Latvian tradition, it was conceived to commemorate a visit of Tsar Alexander III (1881–1894) to Riga, today capital of Latvia.

== See also ==
- List of foods named after people
- List of pastries
