= Celery Victor =

Marinated celery salad dish

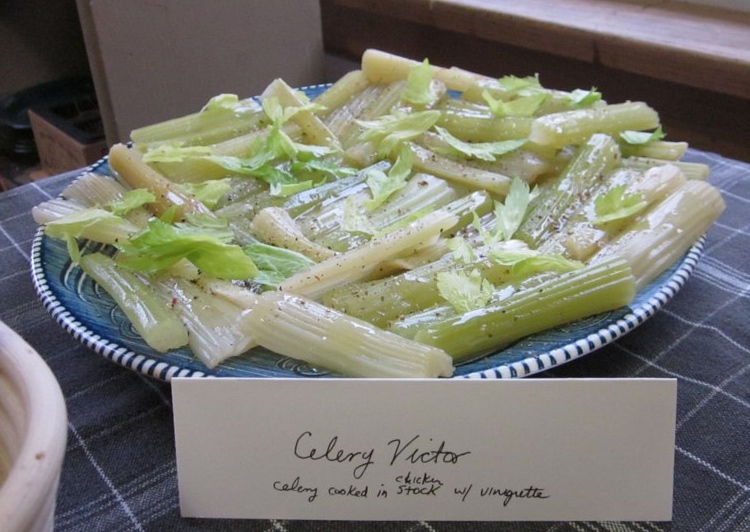
- Type: Salad
- Place of origin: United States
- Region or state: California
- Created by: Victor Hirtzler
- Main ingredients: Celery, stock, peppers, Romaine lettuce

Celery Victor is an historical American marinated celery salad dish invented in 1910 by Victor Hirtzler, head chef at San Francisco's St. Francis Hotel, who is also credited with inventing Crab Louie.

The dish, an "American classic", was popularized by author Clarence Edwords in his 1914 book, A Bohemian Guide to San Francisco Restaurants. To prepare, celery hearts are simmered in a veal, chicken, or beef stock, chilled (often in a citrus or vinegar marinade), tossed with mild peppers, and sometimes served over lettuce.

== See also ==
- List of foods named after people
- List of salads
