= Reinette Simirenko =

Apple cultivar

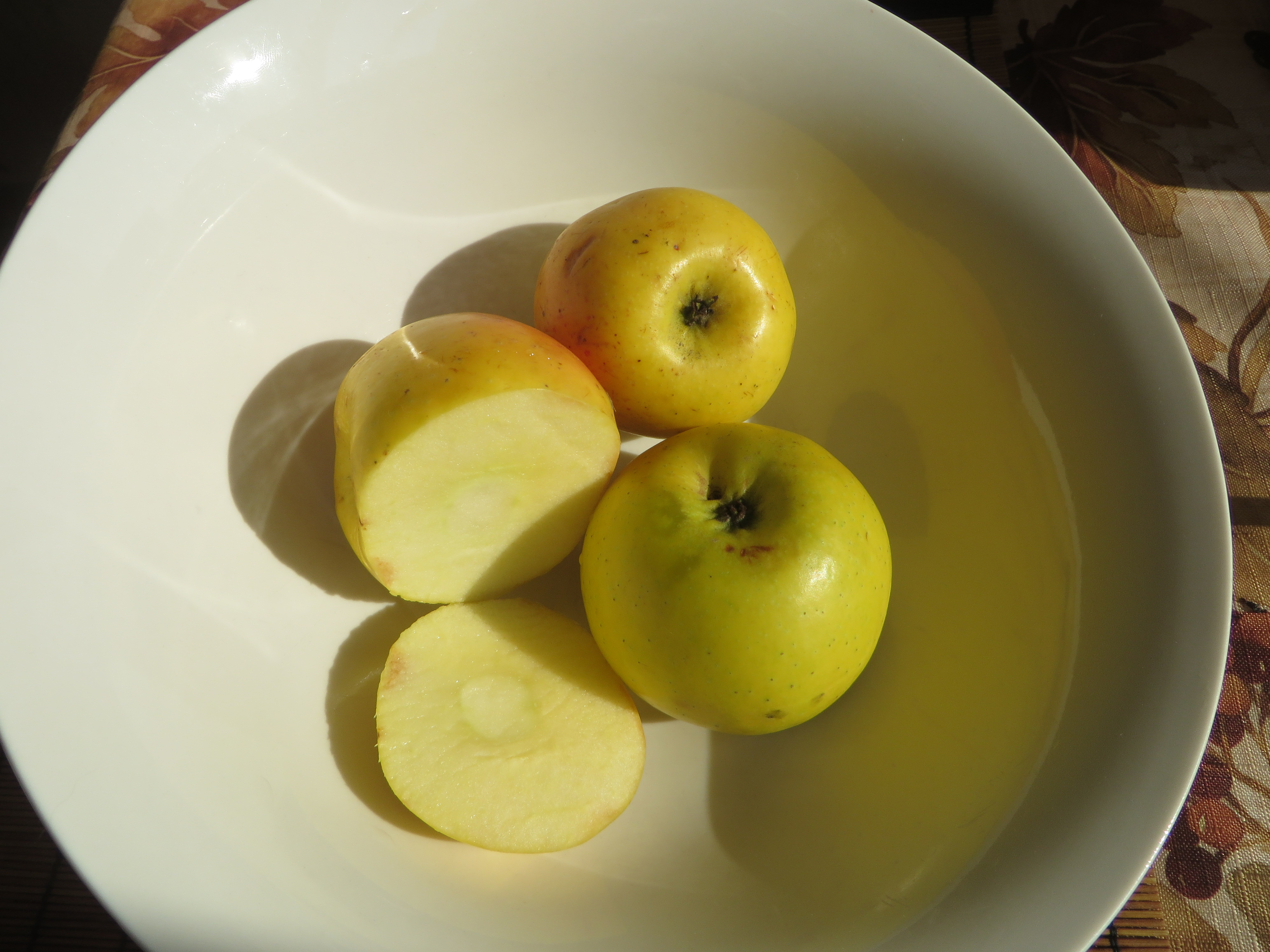
Reinette Simirenko

The Renet Symyrenko is an antique apple variety from Ukraine. The fruit has tender, crisp, greenish white flesh with a subacid flavor. It was the most widely grown variety in the Soviet Union.

Cosmonauts took Renet Symyrenko into space, lending popularity to the story that this variety originated in the garden of Ukrainian Leo Simirenko.
