= Chicken Picasso =

Chicken dish named after Pablo Picasso

- Course: Main
- Place of origin: Spain
- Created by: Pablo Picasso
- Main ingredients: Chicken, bell pepper, butter, onions, garlic, tomatoes, cream, mozzarella, pasta
- Ingredients generally used: Chicken stock or broth, nutmeg, olive oil, Italian seasoning, salt, pepper
- Food energy (per 192 g (6.8 oz) serving): 304 kcal (1,270 kJ)
Nutritional value
(per 192 g (6.8 oz) serving)
- Protein: 29 g
- Fat: 13 g
- Carbohydrate: 7 g

Chicken Picasso is a chicken dish named after painter Pablo Picasso, and supposed to have been created by him. It consists of roasted chicken served with tomatoes, basil and olives.
