= Seckel =

Seckel is a surname. Notable people with the surname include:

- Al Seckel (1958–2015), American writer and skeptic
- Emil Seckel (1864–1924), German jurist and law historian
- Jos Seckel (1881–1945), Dutch painter

== See also ==
- Seckel Isaac Fränkel (1765–1835), German rabbi
- Seckel syndrome
- Hardick & Seckel Factory
