= Victor Hirtzler =

French chef

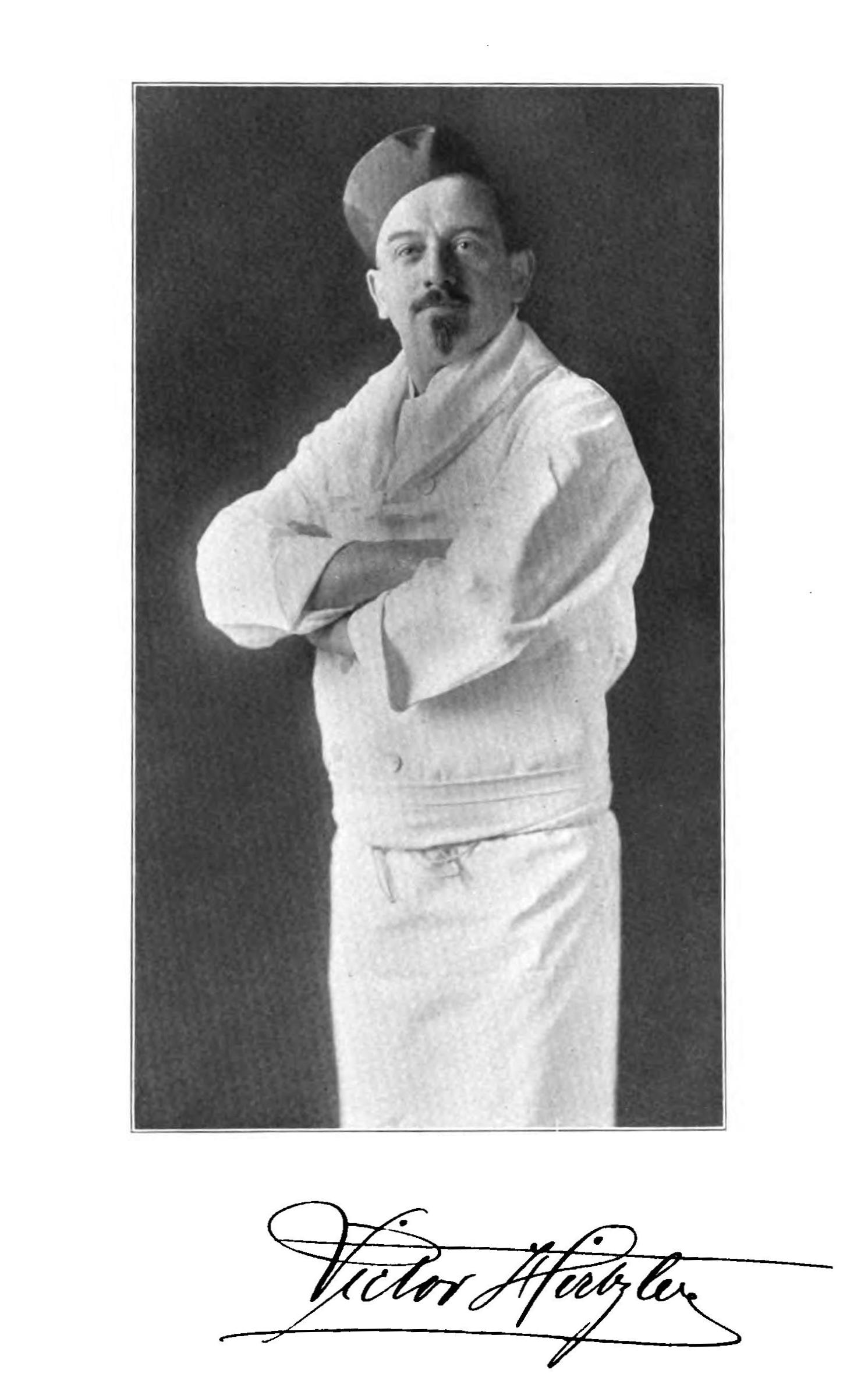
- Lithograph of Victor Hirtzler from The Hotel St. Francis Cook Book
- Born: ca. 1875; Strasbourg, France
- Died: February 9, 1931; Strasbourg, France
- Education: Grand Hotel, Paris, France
- Culinary career
- Cooking style: Classic French, Alsatian
- Previous restaurant(s): Cook and food taster to Czar Nicholas II Chef du cuisine for Carlos I of Portugal Sherry's Restaurant, New York The Waldorf Hotel, New York The Hotel St. Francis, San Francisco

Victor Hirtzler (ca. 1875, Strasbourg – February 9, 1931, Strasbourg) was a French chef who was head chef of San Francisco, California's St. Francis Hotel from its opening in 1904 until 1926. One of America's first celebrity chefs, he publicized himself and his hotel by inventing dishes, writing cookbooks, and hosting meals.

== Biography ==
Hirtzler was born in approximately 1875 in Strasbourg, German Empire. He trained at the Grand Hotel in Paris, France, served as cook and food taster to Czar Nicholas II, and chef du cuisine for Carlos I of Portugal, before moving to Sherry's and the Waldorf in New York City. In 1904 he moved to San Francisco to manage food service at the recently opened St. Francis Hotel on Union Square.

The hotel survived the San Francisco earthquake of 1906, and opened for breakfast as usual that morning, shortly after the quake, to the surprise and admiration of the city's residents. Hirtzler created and named a dish after Enrico Caruso, (Note: The dish was 'Spaghetti Caruso' or 'Macaroni Caruso' and consisted of pasta with a sauce of mushrooms, tomato, shallots and garlic.) a prominent guest at the time. For a number of years, including the 100th anniversary of the disaster, the hotel recreated the morning's menu for a special "Earthquake Survivor Breakfast" in honor of the last few remaining survivors, with dishes including "Chilled Rhubarb Stew", "Southern Hominy with Cream", and "Eggs with Black Truffles in Puff Pastry". However, the hotel interior was soon gutted by fires sweeping the city, and the main part of the hotel closed until 1907.

Known for a thick French accent, a pointed beard and curled moustache, showy costumes that included a red fez, and frequent appearances to greet guests and dignitaries throughout the hotel, Hirtzler "exceeded even the Hollywood portrait of a master chef". His cooking style was French, and he specialized in offering his guests many choices: "A typical dinner menu would offer a choice of fourteen cheeses, twenty clam or oyster dishes, eleven soups, twenty-four relishes, seventeen kinds of fish, and fifty-eight entrées from hamburger to Bohemian ham." Breakfasts included 203 different preparations of eggs, such as "Eggs Moscow" stuffed with caviar. In addition to naming dishes after guests (such as "Eggs Sarah Bernhardt", with diced chicken), Hirtzler invented or renamed a number of dishes after himself including "Chicken Salad Victor", "Crab Cocktail Victor", "Victor Dressing", and the best known, "Celery Victor". Hirtzler may also have invented "Crab Louie".

Hirtzler returned to Strasbourg in 1925, returning to San Francisco briefly in 1926 for the opening of the Mark Hopkins Hotel on Nob Hill. He died in Strasbourg, France, on February 9, 1931, as announced in the Hotel Monthly (Chicago, John Willy). Late in life, Victor had married Regina Caspary (1882–1955), of Beaver Dam, Wisconsin, daughter of the wagon-maker and bottling company owner, Adam Caspary (1835–1907).

== Publications ==
- L'Art Culinaire. Beginning in 1910 Hirtzler promoted his hotel, and his status as a chef, by publishing cookbooks structured as a series of multi-course menus for three meals per day, every day of the year. He titled the initial version (in a "popular" and more expensive "subscription" edition with a 9-page introductory list of "patrons") L'Art Culinaire, after Le guide culinaire, the landmark cookbook by French chef Georges Auguste Escoffier, whom Hirtzler considered a rival. Comprising many French and French-inspired dishes, and written in a similar abbreviated style as Escoffier's book, (e.g. soup stocks are specified as to be cooked "in the usual way", and ingredients such as tarragon vinegar are specified despite being hard to find in most of America at the time) Hirtzler nevertheless included many local dishes and ingredients, such as "California raisins", "cactus fruit" and "Boston baked beans."
- The Hotel St. Francis Cookbook. This 1919 edition is the best known of Hirtzler's St. Francis cookbooks.
