= Bachwürfel =

Austrian cube-shaped confectionery

Bachwürfel, wrapped individually

The Bachwürfel (English: Bach-Cube) is an Austrian confectionery created in 1985 on the occasion of the composer Johann Sebastian Bach's tercentenary by Salzburg confectioner Norbert Fürst.

The cube-shaped candy consists of one layer each of marzipan, nut-truffle, and coffee truffle, coated in dark chocolate. Originally produced as a limited-edition confection, it proved popular with consumers and became a staple product of the cafe and sweetmeat shop Fürst.

== History ==
Prior to Johann Sebastian Bach's anniversary, the Salzburg Bach-Organisation (Salzburger Bachgesellschaft) suggested that Norbert Fürst, whose great-grandfather Paul Fürst in 1890 first presented the Mozartkugel, produce a similar confection dedicated to J.S. Bach.

According to Norbert Fürst's son, Martin Fürst, the jubilee was the sole inducement for his father to come up with the Bachwürfel, as Bach himself had had no special connection to Salzburg.

== Distribution ==
While single Bachwürfel can be purchased, the candy is usually sold in small boxes containing four of the truffle cubes. Each of these is wrapped in plastic foil surrounded with a paper cuff imprinted with the composer's portrait.
