= Seckel pear =

Edible fruit cultivar

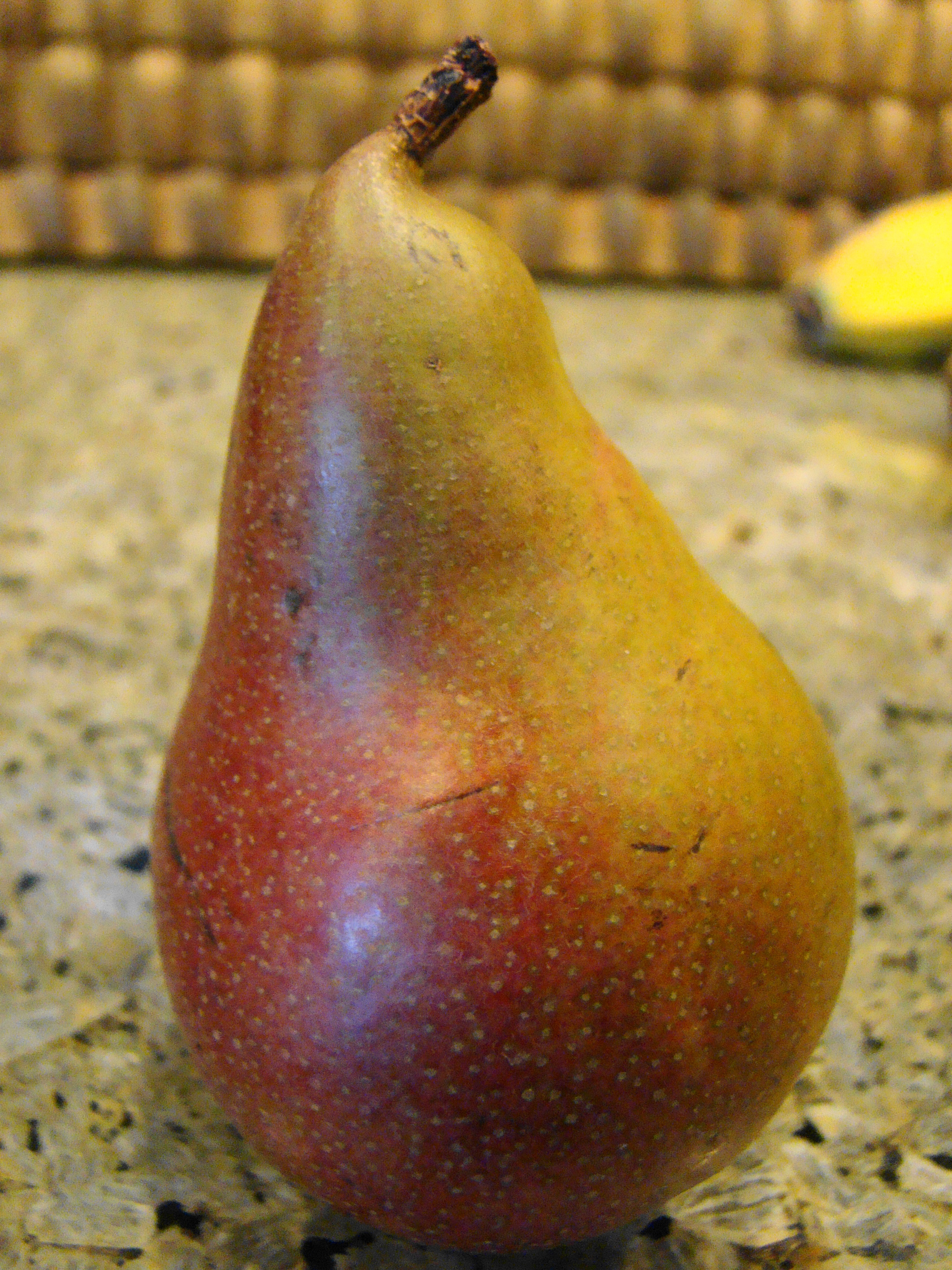
- Genus: Pyrus
- Species: Pyrus communis
- Hybrid parentage: wild seedling
- Cultivar: Seckel
- Origin: Pennsylvania

The Seckel pear (or sugar pear) is a small, very sweet cultivar of pear believed to have originated in Philadelphia, Pennsylvania.

== Cultivar history ==
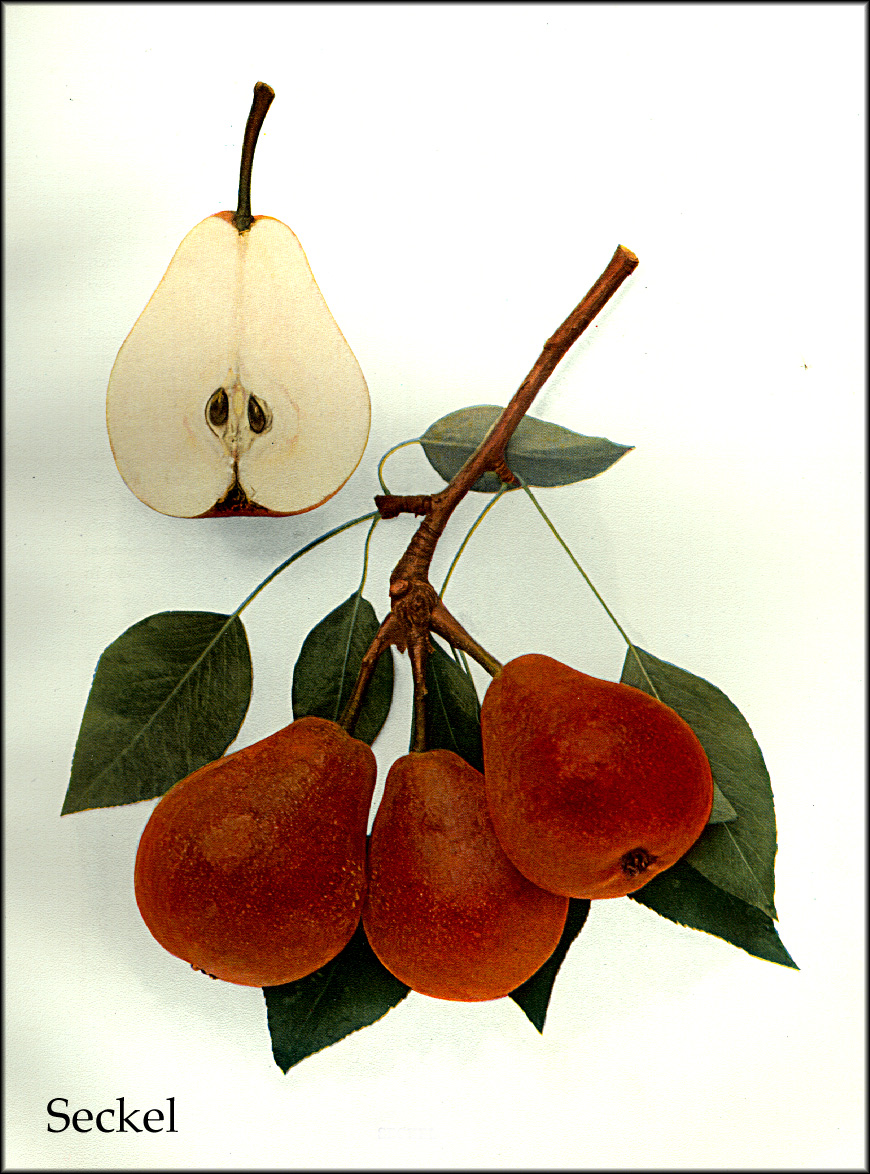
1921 illustration of the fruit

The Seckel is said to be named after the Pennsylvania farmer who first introduced it in the late 18th century. It was one of the varieties planted at Monticello by Thomas Jefferson, who said it "exceeded anything I have tasted since I left France, and equalled any pear I had seen there." His high regard for the Seckel was shared by the eminent horticulturalist A. J. Downing, who rated its flavor above even European pear varieties.

== Tree characteristics ==
The Seckel pear tree is relatively small, reaching a height of 15-20 feet and width of about 10 feet. It has light grey bark and resembles an apple tree. Its white flowers bloom in mid-Spring. The tree is cold-hardy, frost-resistant, and resistant to fire blight.

== Fruit characteristics ==
The Seckel is a winter pear, harvested in the fall, which can be stored for about 5 months. The fruit is very sweet and soft ("melting" or "buttery" flesh), with a coarser grain than most European varieties. Compared to most other pears, they are very small, less than 3" in length and width.
