= Wineberry =

Wineberry may refer to the following plants:

- Aristotelia chilensis, Chilean wineberry
- Aristotelia serrata, a tree which is endemic to New Zealand
- Rubus phoenicolasius, a type of raspberry native to Asia and introduced to North America
- Vaccinium myrtillus, a fruit also called Bilberry
- An archaic term for the grape
