= Anne Deslions =

French courtesan during the Second French Empire

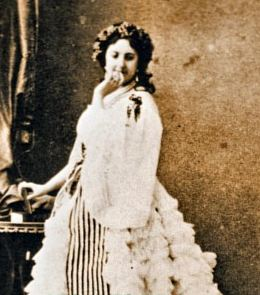
Anne Deslions

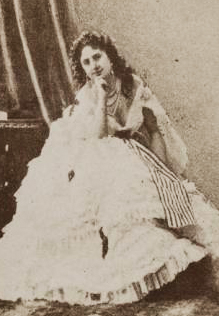
Anne Deslions

Anne Deslions (died 1873) was a French courtesan, one of the most famous demimonde courtesans during the Second Empire.

She was born in poverty, and ran away from a brothel at the age of sixteen, after which she was established as a high class courtesan in Paris. One of her most known clients were Prince Napoléon Bonaparte.

She has been pointed out as the role model for the character of Nana by Émile Zola.

A French potato dish, Pommes de terre Annette or Pommes Anna, was created and named by French chef Adolphe Dugléré for Anna Deslions, who frequented Dugléré's Café Anglais (Paris).
