= Restaurant =

Single establishment that prepares and serves food

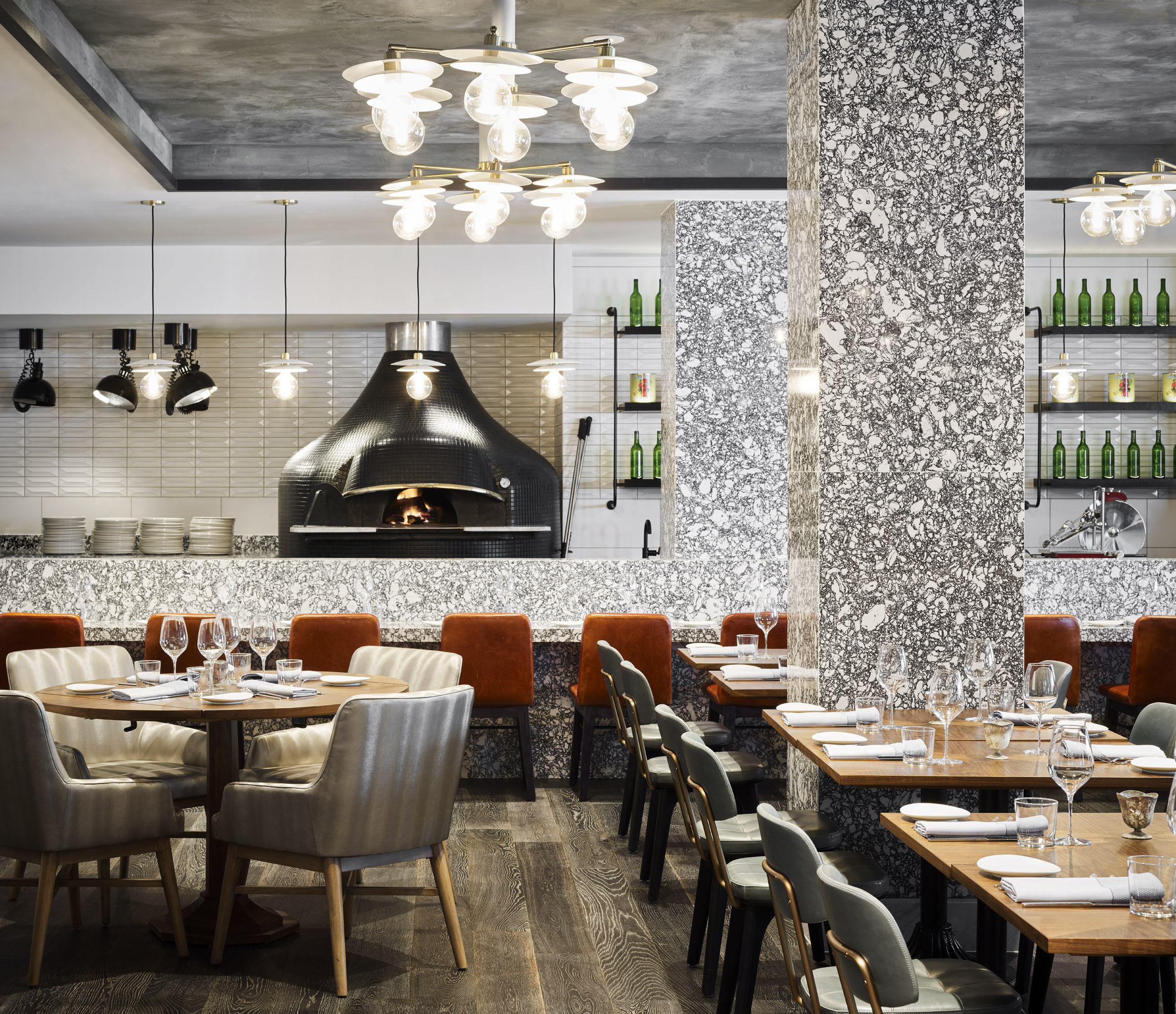
The dining room of the Via Sophia in Washington, D.C., United States, which is a high-end luxury restaurant establishment

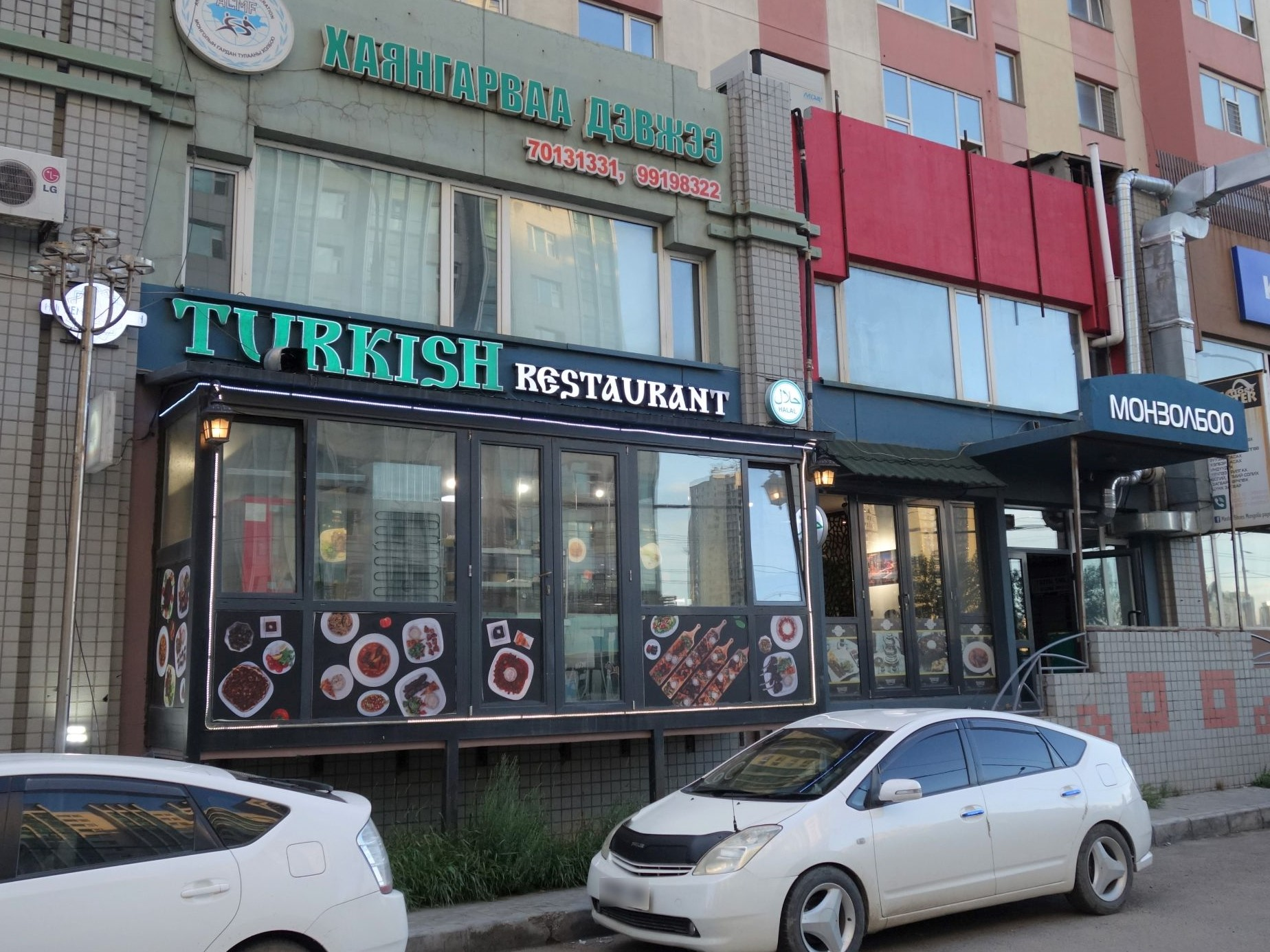
A Turkish restaurant in Mongolia

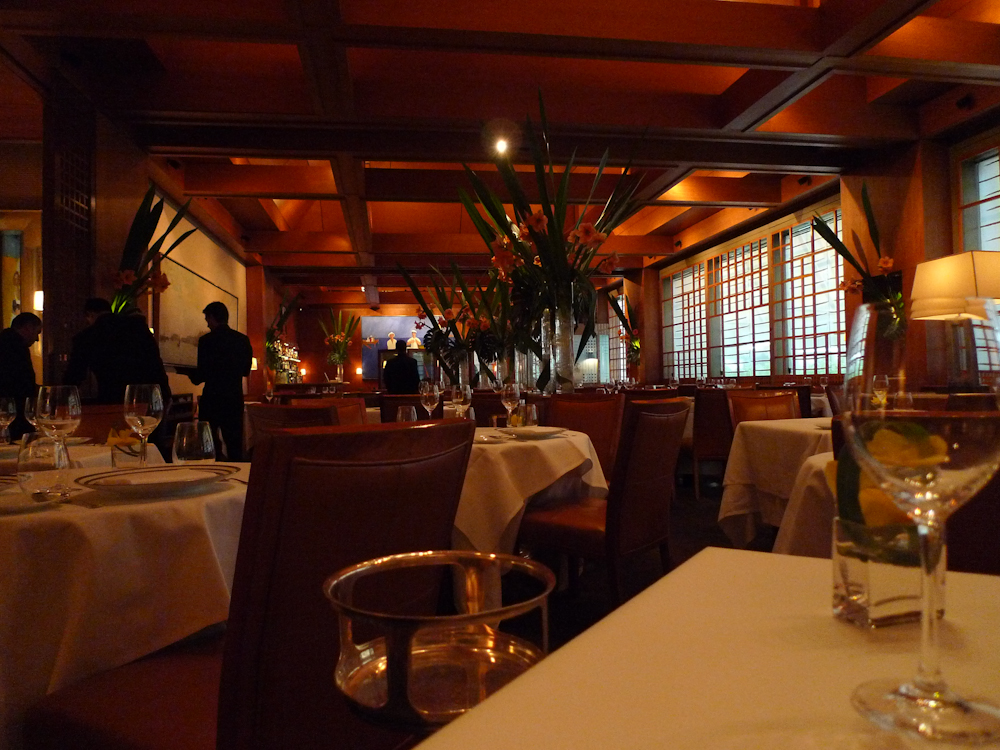
The dining room of Le Bernardin, which is a restaurant in Midtown, Manhattan, New York City. Restaurants may serve cuisines native to foreign countries. This one, for instance, serves French cuisine along with seafood.

A restaurant is a business that prepares and serves food and beverages to customers. Meals are generally served and eaten on the premises, but many restaurants also offer take-out and food delivery services. Restaurants vary greatly in appearance and offerings, featuring a wide variety of cuisines and service models — ranging from inexpensive fast-food restaurants and cafeterias to mid-priced family restaurants to high-priced luxury establishments.

== Etymology ==
The word derives from the early 19th century, taken from the French word restaurer 'provide meat for', literally 'restore to a former state' and, being the present participle of the verb, the term restaurant may have been used in 1507 as a "restorative beverage", and in correspondence in 1521 to mean 'that which restores the strength, a fortifying food or remedy'.

== History ==
Archaeological excavations in 2023 at the ancient Sumerian city of Lagash (modern-day southern Iraq) have revealed the remains of a third-millennium BCE public food establishment, dated to approximately 2700 BCE. The site contained benches, an oven, food preparation areas, and numerous standardized bowls, some of which preserved traces of food and beer. This site was clearly used by everyday people rather than just elites, featuring large quantities of conical cups and large jars for holding beer. These features have been interpreted by researchers as evidence of a communal dining space where prepared meals and beverages were served to patrons, reflecting organized food service in an urban context. The discovery provides insight into daily life in early Mesopotamian cities and suggests that non-elite populations had access to shared social spaces for dining and drinking.

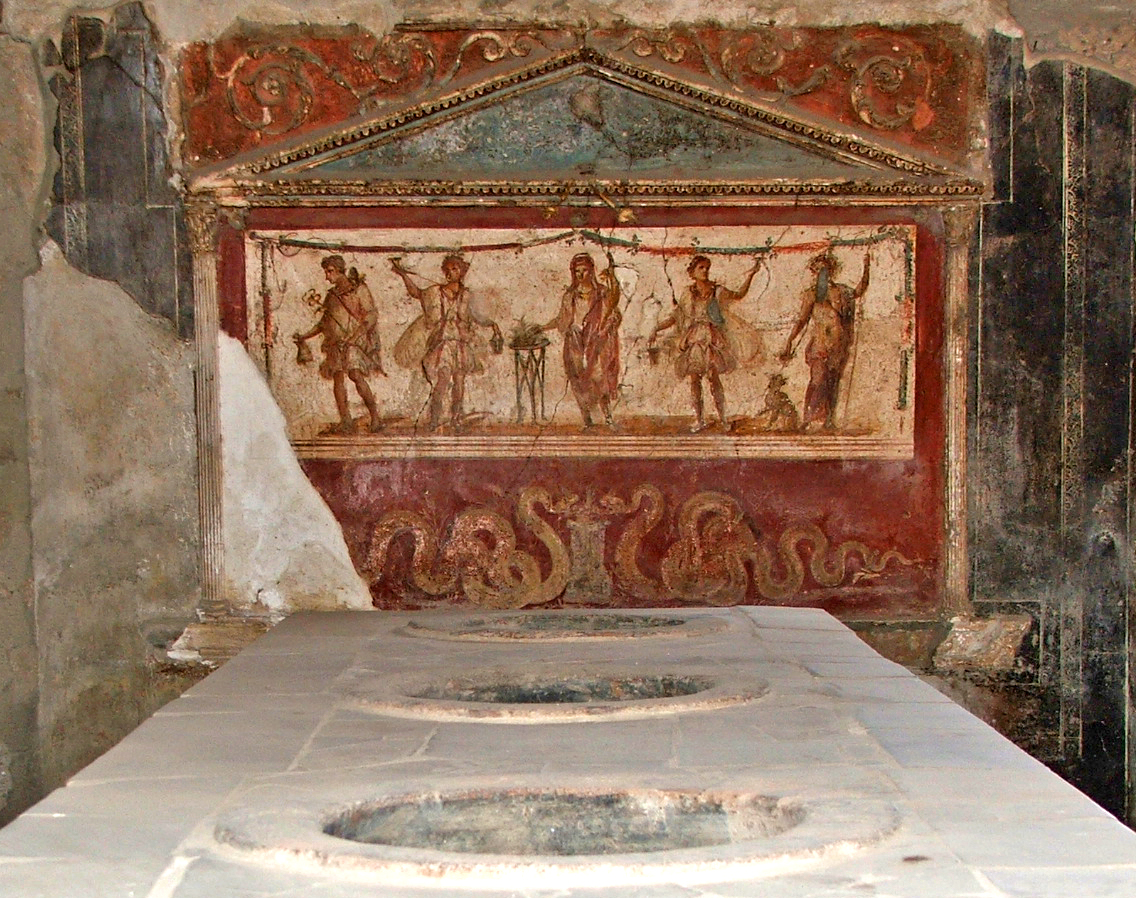
Remains of a thermopolium in Pompeii

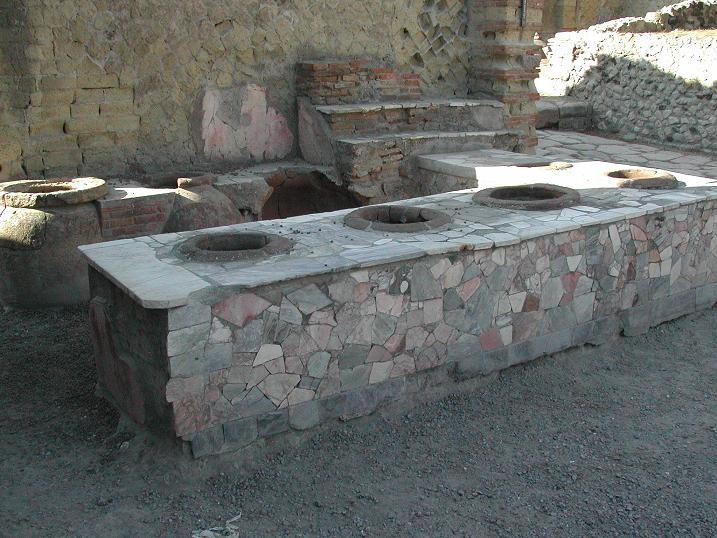
Service counter of a thermopolium in Pompeii

A public eating-establishment similar to a restaurant is mentioned in a 512 BC record from Ancient Egypt. It served only one dish, a plate of cereal, wildfowl, and onions.

A forerunner for the modern restaurant is the thermopolium, an establishment in Ancient Greece or Ancient Rome that sold and served ready-to-eat food and beverages. These establishments were somewhat similar in function to modern fast-food restaurants. They were most often frequented by people who lacked private kitchens. In the Roman Empire, they were popular among residents of insulae.

In Pompeii, 158 thermopolia with service-counters have been identified throughout the town. They were concentrated along the main axis of the town and near public spaces where they were frequented by the locals.

The Romans also had the popina, a wine bar which in addition to a variety of wines offered a limited selection of simple foods such as olives, bread, cheese, stews, sausage, and porridge. The popinae were known as places for the plebeians of the lower classes of Roman society to socialize. While some were confined to one standing room only, others had tables and stools and a few even had couches.

Another early forerunner of the restaurant was the inn. Throughout the ancient world, inns were set up alongside roads to cater to people travelling between cities, offering lodging and food. Meals were typically served at a common table to guests. However, there were no menus or options to choose from.

Early eating establishments recognizable as restaurants in the modern sense emerged in Song dynasty China during the 11th and 12th centuries. In large cities, such as Kaifeng and Hangzhou, food catering establishments catered to merchants who travelled between cities. Probably growing out of tea houses and taverns which catered to travellers, Kaifeng's restaurants blossomed into an industry that catered to locals as well as people from other regions of China. As travelling merchants were not used to the local cuisine of other cities, these establishments were set up to serve dishes familiar to merchants from other parts of China. Such establishments were located in the entertainment districts of major cities, alongside hotels, bars, and brothels. The larger and more opulent of these establishments offered a dining experience similar to modern restaurant culture. According to a Chinese manuscript from 1126, patrons of one such establishment were greeted with a selection of pre-plated demonstration dishes which represented food options. Customers had their orders taken by a team of waiters who would then sing their orders to the kitchen and distribute the dishes in the exact order in which they had been ordered.

There is a direct correlation between the growth of the restaurant businesses and institutions of theatrical stage drama, gambling and prostitution which served the burgeoning merchant middle class during the Song dynasty. Restaurants catered to different styles of cuisine, price brackets, and religious requirements. Even within a single restaurant choices were available, and people ordered the entrée from written menus. An account from 1275 writes of Hangzhou, the capital city for the last half of the dynasty:

The people of Hangzhou are very difficult to please. Hundreds of orders are given on all sides: this person wants something hot, another something cold, a third something tepid, a fourth something chilled. one wants cooked food, another raw, another chooses roast, another grill.

The restaurants in Hangzhou also catered to many northern Chinese who had fled south from Kaifeng during the Jurchen invasion of the 1120s, while it is also known that many restaurants were run by families formerly from Kaifeng.

In Japan, a restaurant culture emerged in the 16th century out of local tea houses. Tea house owner Sen no Rikyū created the kaiseki multi-course meal tradition, and his grandsons expanded the tradition to include speciality dishes and cutlery which matched the aesthetic of the food.

In Europe, inns which offered food and lodgings and taverns where food was served alongside alcoholic beverages were common into the Middle Ages and Renaissance. They typically served common fare of the type normally available to peasants. In Spain, such establishments were called bodegas and served tapas. In England, they typically served foods such as sausage and shepherd's pie. Cookshops were also common in European cities during the Middle Ages. These were establishments which served dishes such as pies, puddings, sauces, fish, and baked meats. Customers could either buy a ready-made meal or bring their own meat to be cooked. As only large private homes had the means for cooking, the inhabitants of European cities were significantly reliant on them. From the 16th century, establishments known as ordinaries (taverns or inns) served fixed-price meals in England.

France in particular has a rich history with the development of various forms of inns and eateries, eventually to form many of the now-ubiquitous elements of the modern restaurant. As far back as the thirteenth century, French inns served a variety of food — bread, cheese, bacon, roasts, soups, and stews - usually eaten at a common table. Parisians could buy what was essentially take-out food from rôtisseurs, who prepared roasted-meat dishes, and from pastry-cooks, who could prepare meat pies and often more elaborate dishes. Municipal statutes stated that the official prices per item were to be posted at the entrance; this was the first official mention of menus.

Taverns also served food, as did cabarets. A cabaret, however, unlike a tavern, served food at tables with tablecloths, provided drinks with the meal, and charged by the customers' choice of dish, rather than by the pot. Cabarets were reputed to serve better food than taverns and a few, such as the Petit Maure, became well-known. A few cabarets had musicians or singing, but most, until the late-19th century, were simply convivial eating-places. The first café opened in Paris in 1672 at the Saint-Germain fair. By 1723 there were nearly four hundred cafés in Paris, but their menu was limited to simpler dishes or confectionaries, such as coffee, tea, chocolate (the drink; chocolate in solid state was invented only in the 19th century), ice creams, pastries, and liqueurs.

At the end of the 16th century, the guild of cook-caterers (later known as traiteurs) gained its own legal status. The traiteurs dominated sophisticated food-service, delivering or preparing meals for the wealthy at their residences. Taverns and cabarets were limited to serving little more than roast or grilled meats. Towards the end of the seventeenth century, both inns and then traiteurs began to offer "host's tables" (French: tables d'hôte), where one paid a set price to sit at a large table with other guests and eat a fixed menu meal.

=== Modern format ===
The earliest modern-format "restaurants" to use that word in Paris were the establishments which served bouillon, a broth made of meat and egg which was said to restore health and vigour. The first restaurant of this kind was opened in 1765 or 1766 by Mathurin Roze de Chantoiseau on rue des Poulies, now part of the Rue de Louvre. The name of the owner is sometimes given as Boulanger. Unlike earlier eating places, it was elegantly decorated, and besides meat broth offered a menu of several other "restorative" dishes, including macaroni. Chantoiseau and other chefs took the title "traiteurs-restaurateurs". While not the first establishment where one could order food, or even soups, it is thought to be the first to offer a menu of available choices.

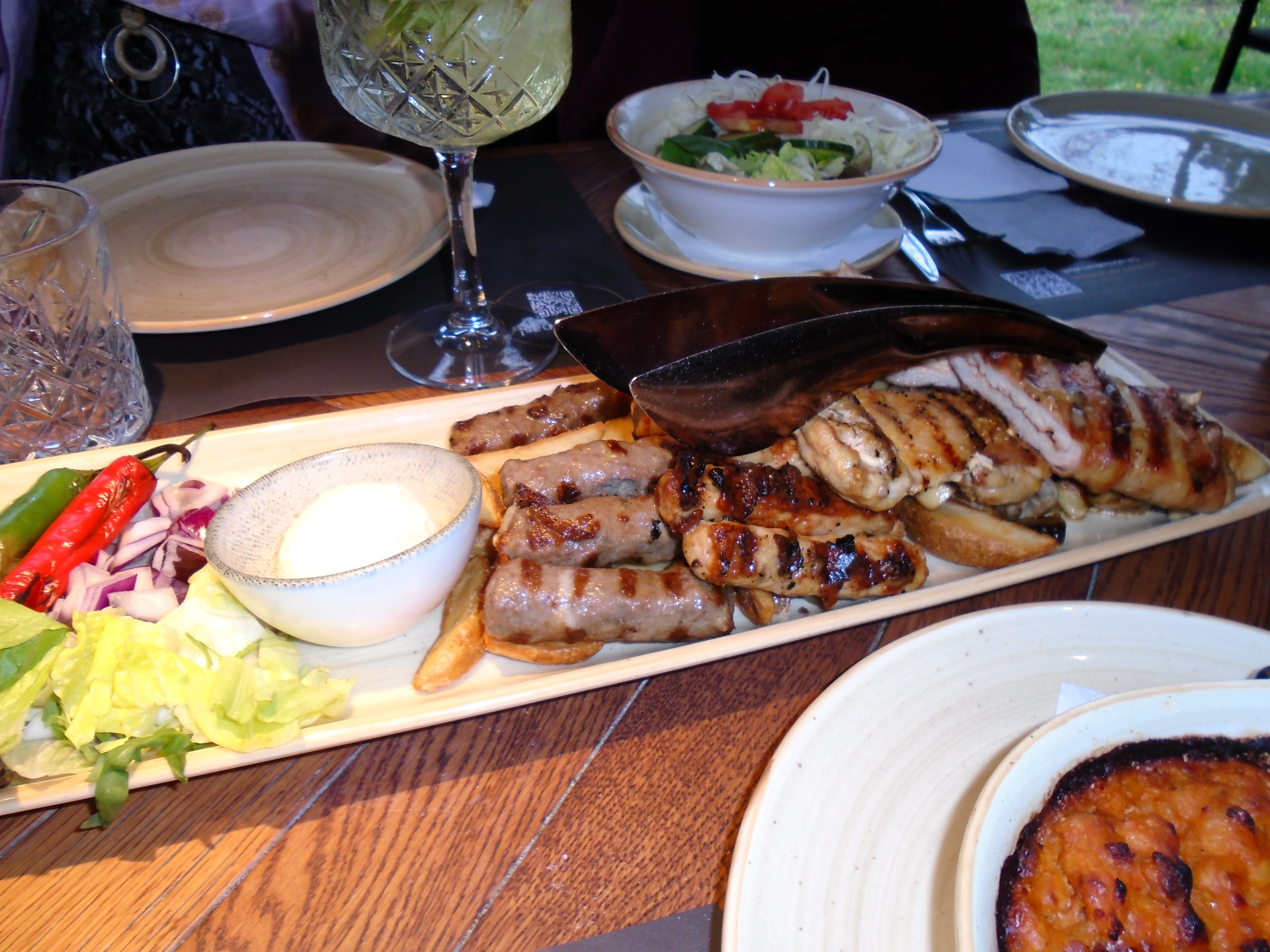
Food grilled in a restaurant

In the Western world, the concept of a restaurant as a public venue where waiting staff serve patrons food from a fixed menu is a relatively recent one, dating from the late 18th century.

In June 1786, the Provost of Paris issued a decree giving the new kind of eating establishment official status, authorising restaurateurs to receive clients and to offer them meals until eleven in the evening in winter and midnight in summer. Ambitious cooks from noble households began to open more elaborate eating places. The first luxury restaurant in Paris, the La Grande Taverne de Londres, was opened at the Palais-Royal at the beginning of 1786 by Antoine Beauvilliers, the former chef of the Count of Provence. It had mahogany tables, linen tablecloths, chandeliers, well-dressed and trained waiters, a long wine list and an extensive menu of elaborately prepared and presented dishes. Dishes on its menu included partridge with cabbage, veal chops grilled in buttered paper, and duck with turnips. This is considered to have been the "first real restaurant". According to Brillat-Savarin, the restaurant was "the first to combine the four essentials of an elegant room, smart waiters, a choice cellar, and superior cooking".

The aftermath of the French Revolution saw the number of restaurants skyrocket. Due to the mass emigration of nobles from the country, many cooks from aristocratic households who were left unemployed went on to found new restaurants. One restaurant was started in 1791 by Méot, the former chef of the Duke of Orleans, which offered a wine list with twenty-two choices of red wine and twenty-seven of white wine. By the end of the century there were a collection of luxury restaurants at the Grand-Palais: Huré, the Couvert espagnol; Février; the Grotte flamande; Véry, Masse and the Café de Chartres (still open, now Le Grand Véfour).

In 1802 the term was applied to an establishment where restorative foods, such as bouillon, a meat broth, were served ("établissement de restaurateur"). The closure of culinary guilds and societal changes resulting from the Industrial Revolution contributed significantly to the increased prevalence of restaurants in Europe.

== Types of restaurants ==
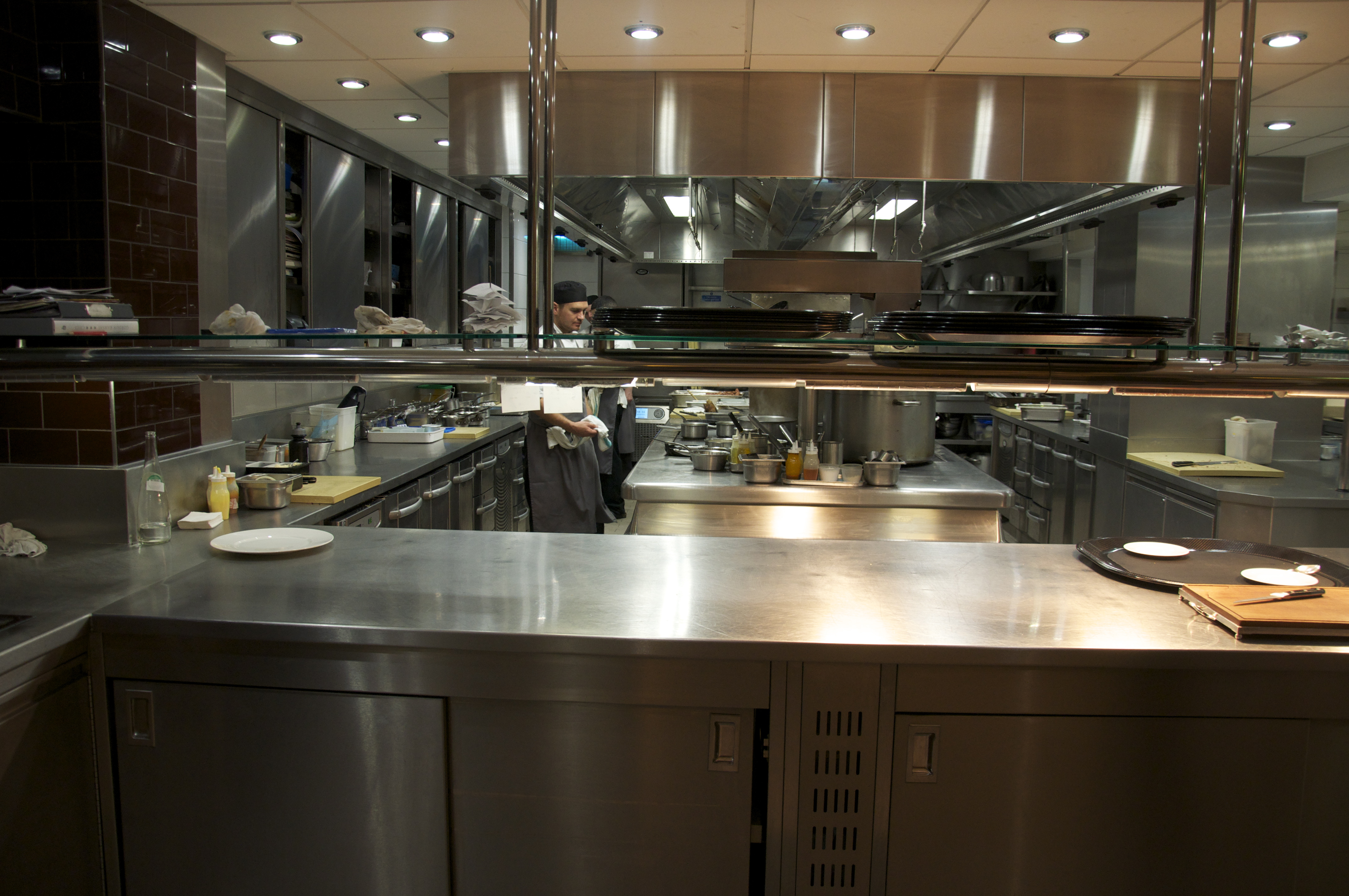
The kitchen of Pétrus, in Central London

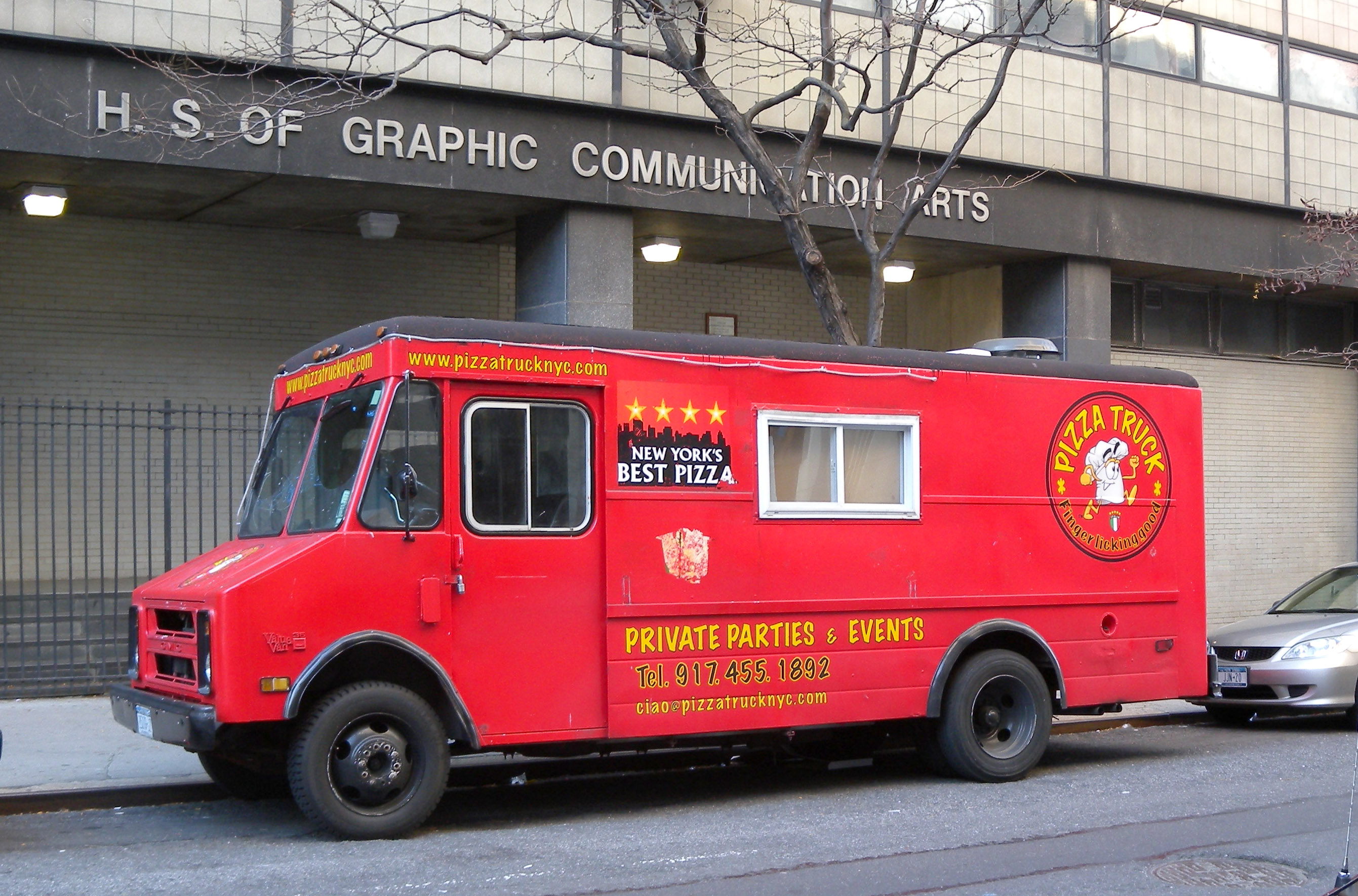
Pizza truck in Midtown Manhattan

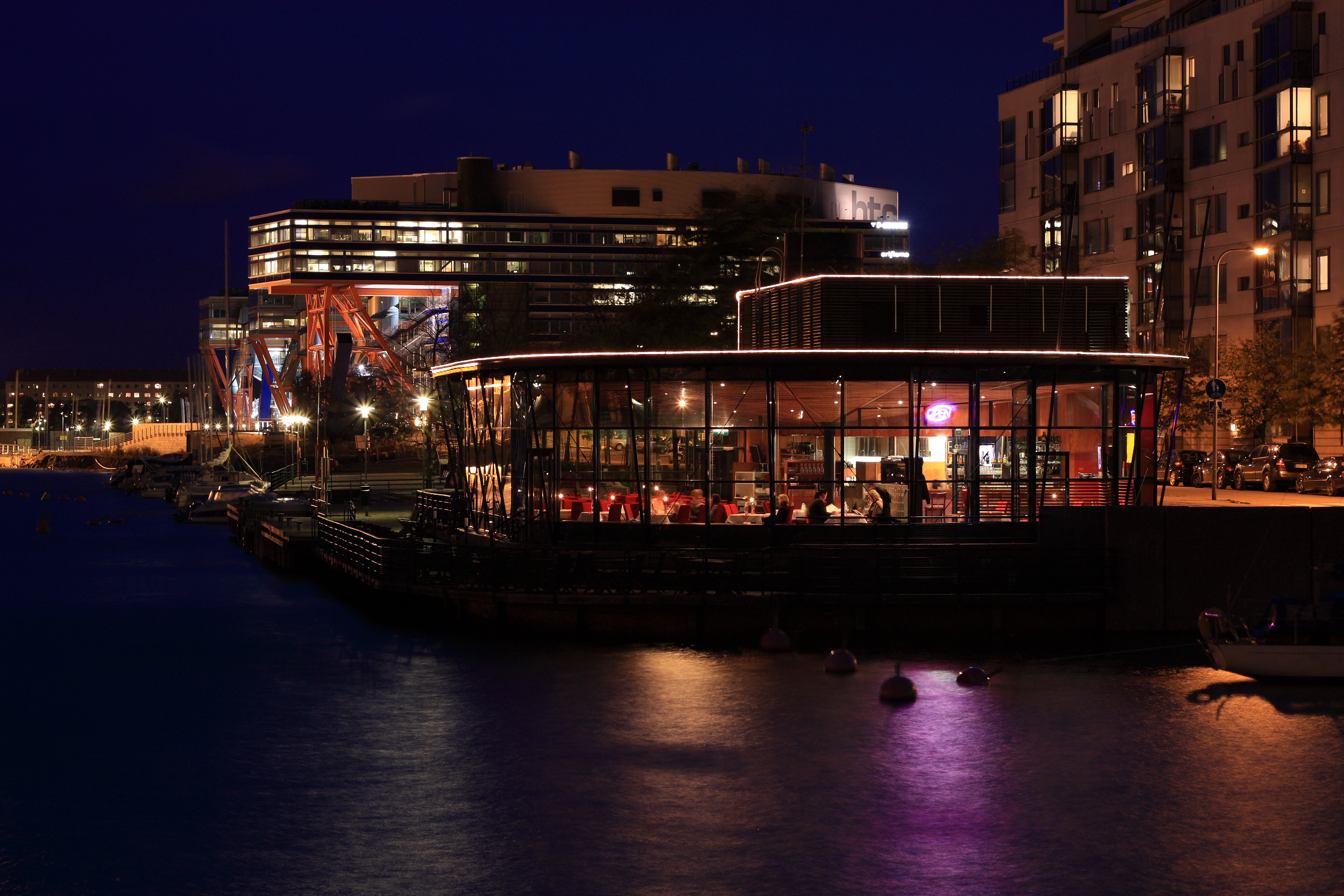
A restaurant at the shoreline in Ruoholahti, Helsinki, Finland

In the 1980s and 1990s, the restaurant industry was revolutionized by entrepreneurs, including Terence Conran, Alan Yau, and Oliver Peyton. Today restaurants are classified or distinguished in many different ways. The primary factor is usually the food itself e.g. vegetarianism, seafood, or steak. The origin of the cuisine may be also used to categorize restaurants e.g. Italian, Korean, Chinese, Japanese, Indian, French, Mexican, or Thai. The style of offering has become an important distinguishing factor in the restaurant industry e.g. tapas, sushi, buffet, or yum cha. Beyond this, restaurants may differentiate themselves on factors including speed of service e.g. fast food. Theme restaurants and automated restaurant have become big players in the restaurant industry and may include fine dining, casual dining, contemporary casual, family style, fast casual, coffeehouse, concession stands, food trucks, pop-up restaurants, and ghost restaurants.

Restaurants range from inexpensive and informal lunching or dining places catering to people working nearby, with modest food served in simple settings at low prices, to expensive establishments serving refined food and fine wines in a formal setting. In the former case, customers usually wear casual clothing. In the latter case, depending on culture and local traditions, customers might wear semi-casual, semi-formal or formal wear. Typically, at mid- to high-priced restaurants, customers sit at tables, their orders are taken by a waiter, who brings the food when it is ready. After eating, the customers then pay the bill. In some restaurants, such as those in workplaces, there are usually no waiters; the customers use trays, on which they place cold items that they select from a refrigerated container and hot items which they request from cooks, and then they pay a cashier before they sit down. Another restaurant approach which uses few waiters is the buffet restaurant. Customers serve food onto their own plates and then pay at the end of the meal. Buffet restaurants typically still have waiters to serve drinks and alcoholic beverages. Fast food establishments are also considered to be restaurants. In addition, food trucks are another popular option for people who want quick food service.

Tourists around the world can enjoy dining services on railway dining cars and cruise ship dining rooms, in some cities a restaurant tram is operated, which are essentially travelling restaurants. Most cruise ships provide a variety of dining experiences including a main restaurant, satellite restaurants, room service, speciality restaurants, cafes, bars and buffets to name a few. Some restaurants on these cruise ships require table reservations and operate specific dress codes. The railway dining services also cater to the needs of travellers by providing railway refreshment rooms at railway stations.

== Restaurant staff ==
A restaurant's proprietor is called a restaurateur, this derives from the French verb restaurer, meaning "to restore". Professional cooks are called chefs, with there being various finer distinctions (e.g. sous-chef, chef de partie). Most restaurants (other than fast food restaurants and cafeterias) will have various waiting staff to serve food, beverages and alcoholic drinks, including busboys who remove used dishes and cutlery. In finer restaurants, this may include a host or hostess, a maître d'hôtel to welcome customers and seat them, and a sommelier or wine waiter to help patrons select wines. A new route to becoming a restaurateur, rather than working one's way up through the stages, is to operate a food truck. Once a sufficient following has been obtained, a permanent restaurant site can be opened. This trend has become common in the UK and the US.

=== Chef's table ===
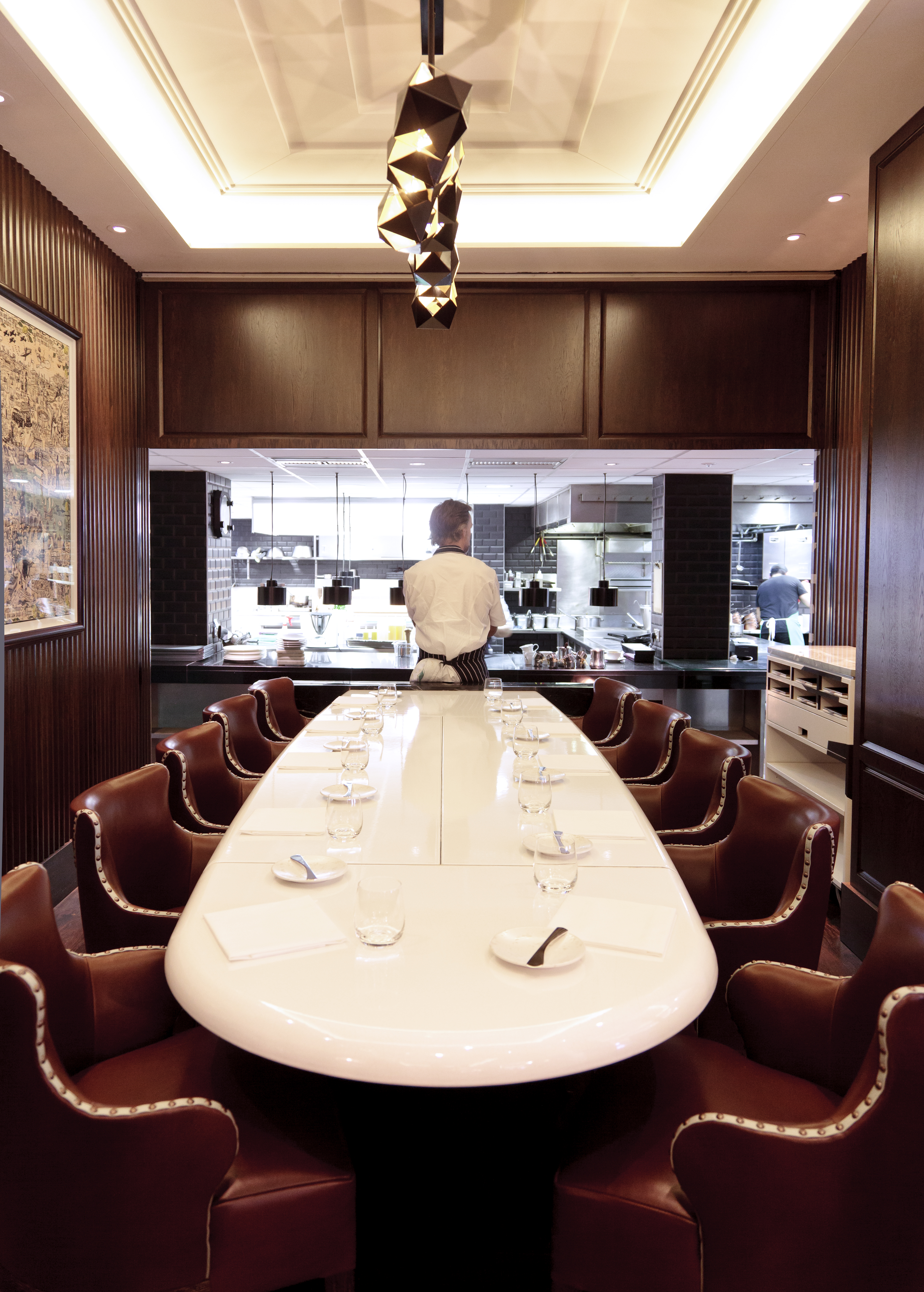
Chef's table at Marcus restaurant in Central London

A chef's table is a table located in the kitchen of a restaurant, reserved for VIPs and special guests. Patrons may be served a themed tasting menu prepared and served by the head chef. Restaurants can require a minimum party and charge a higher flat fee.

== By country ==
=== France ===
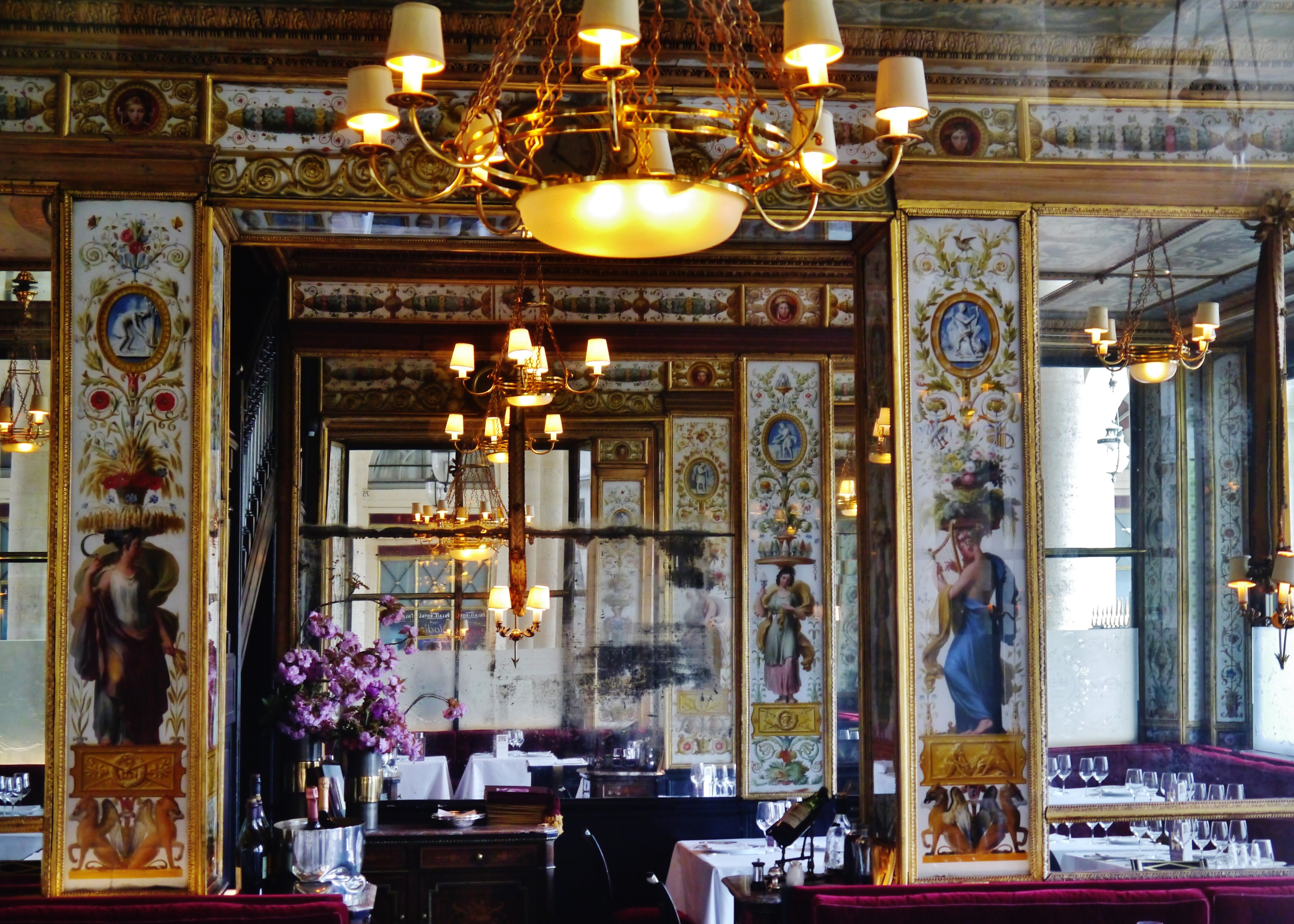
Le Grand Véfour restaurant at the Palais Royal in Paris

France has a long tradition with public eateries and modern restaurant culture emerged there. In the early 19th century, traiteurs and restaurateurs became known simply as "restaurateurs". The use of the term "restaurant" for the establishment itself only became common in the 19th century.

According to the legend, the first mention to a restaurant dates back to 1765 in Paris. It was located on Rue des Poulies, now Rue du Louvre, and use to serve dishes known as "restaurants". The place was run by a man named Mr. Boulanger. However, according to the Larousse Gastronomique, La Grande Taverne de Londres which opened in 1782 is considered as the first Parisian restaurant.

The first restaurant guide, called Almanach des Gourmands, written by Grimod de La Reyniére, was published in 1804. During the French Restoration period, the most celebrated restaurant was the Rocher de Cancale, frequented by the characters of Balzac. In the middle of the century, Balzac's characters moved to the Café Anglais, which in 1867 also hosted the famous Three Emperors Dinner hosted by Napoleon III in honor of Tsar Alexander II, Kaiser Wilhelm I and Otto von Bismarck during the Exposition Universelle in 1867

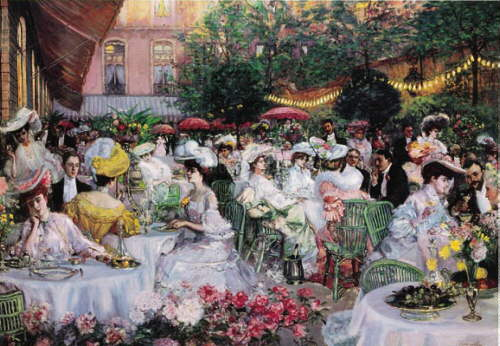
Garden café of the Hôtel Ritz Paris (1904), Pierre-Georges Jeanniot

Other restaurants that occupy a place in French history and literature include Maxim's and Fouquet's. The restaurant of Hotel Ritz Paris, opened in 1898, was made famous by its chef, Auguste Escoffier. The 19th century also saw the appearance of new kinds of more modest restaurants, including the bistrot. The brasserie featured beer and was made popular during the 1867 Paris Exposition.

=== United States ===
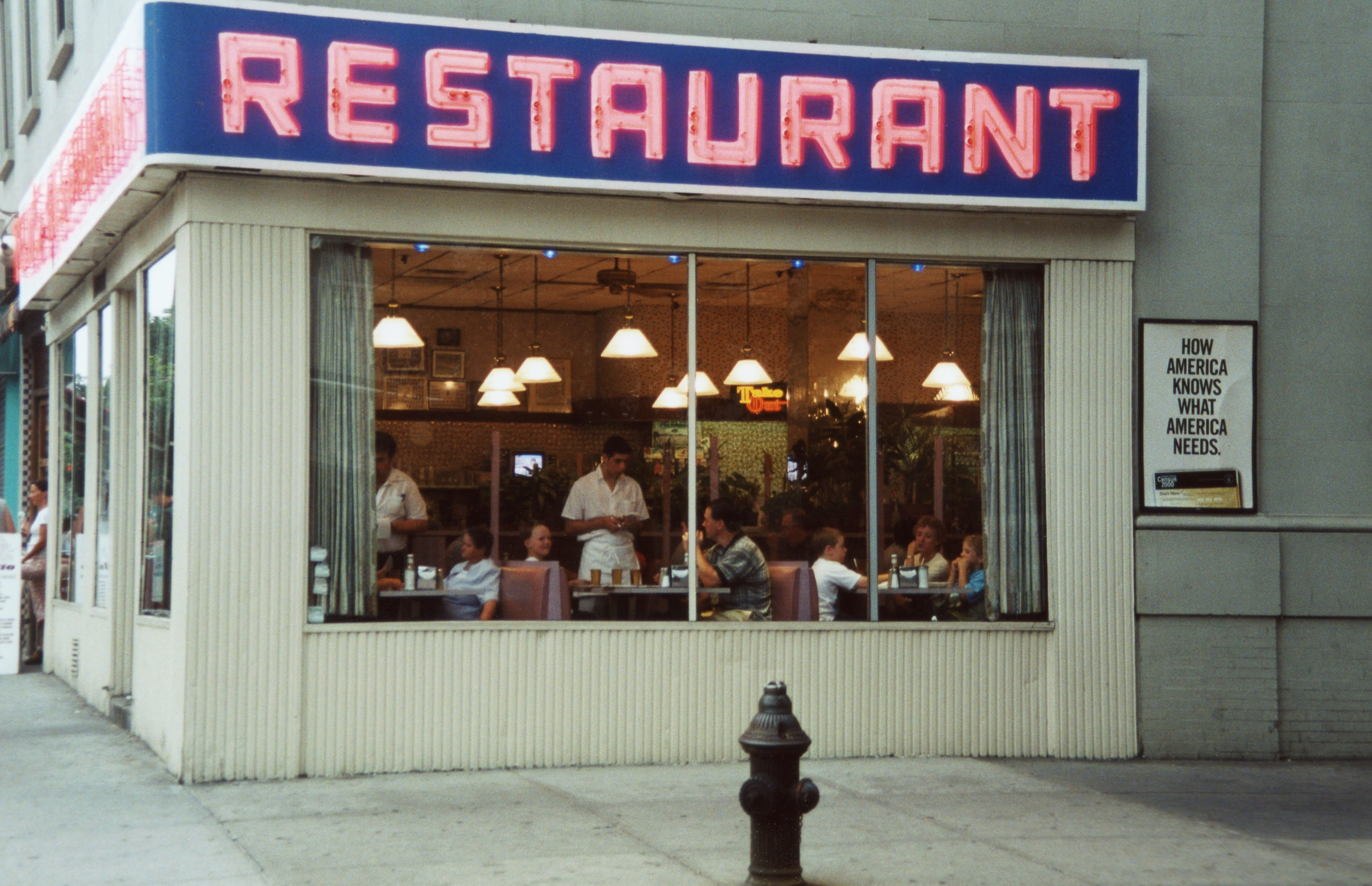
Tom's Restaurant in Manhattan was made internationally famous by Seinfeld.

In the United States, it was not until the late 18th century that establishments that provided meals without also providing lodging began to appear in major metropolitan areas in the form of coffee and oyster houses. The actual term "restaurant" did not enter into the common parlance until the following century. Prior to being referred to as "restaurants" these eating establishments assumed regional names such as "eating house" in New York City, "restorator" in Boston, or "victualling house" in other areas. Restaurants were typically located in populous urban areas during the 19th century and grew both in number and sophistication in the mid-century due to a more affluent middle class and to urbanization. The highest concentration of these restaurants were in the West, followed by industrial cities on the Eastern Seaboard.

When Prohibition went into effect in 1920, restaurants offering fine dining had a hard time making ends meet because they had depended on profits from selling wine and alcoholic beverages. Replacing them were establishments offering simpler, more casual experiences such as cafeterias, roadside restaurants, and diners. When Prohibition ended in the 1930s, luxury restaurants slowly started to appear again as the economy recovered from the Great Depression.

The Civil Rights Act of 1964 outlawed segregation based on race, color, religion, or national origin in all public accommodations engaged in interstate commerce, including restaurants. Katzenbach v. McClung, 379 U.S. 294 (1964), was a decision of the US Supreme Court which held that Congress acted within its power under the Commerce Clause of the United States Constitution in forbidding racial discrimination in restaurants as this was a burden to interstate commerce.

In the 1970s, there was one restaurant for every 7,500 persons. In 2016, there were 1,000,000 restaurants; one for every 310 people. The average person eats out five to six times weekly. 3.3% of the nation's workforce is composed of restaurant workers. According to a Gallup Poll in 2016, nearly 61% of Americans across the country eat out at a restaurant once a week or more, and this percent is only predicted to increase in future years. Before the COVID-19 pandemic, The National Restaurant Association estimated restaurant sales of $899 billion in 2020. The association now projects that the pandemic will decrease that to $675 billion, a decline of $274 billion over their previous estimate.

=== Colombia ===
The word piquete can be used to refer to a common Colombian type of meal that includes meat, yuca and potatoes, which is a type of meal served at a piqueteadero. The verb form of the word piquete, piquetear, means to participate in binging, liquor drinking, and leisure activities in popular areas or open spaces.

=== Peru ===
In Peru, many indigenous, Spanish, and Chinese dishes are frequently found. Because of recent immigration from places such as China, and Japan, there are many Chinese and Japanese restaurants around the country, especially in the capital city of Lima.

== Guides ==
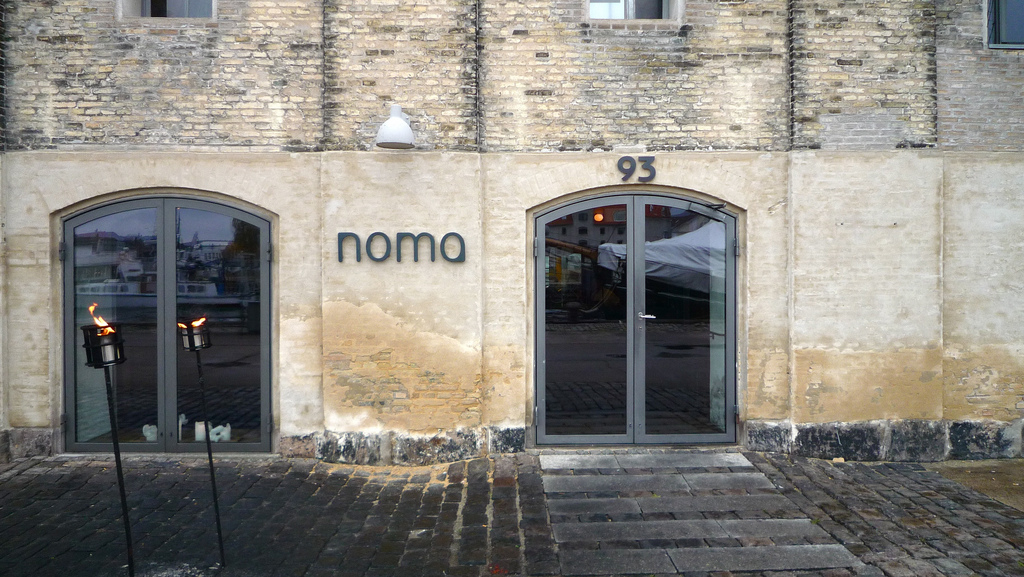
Noma in Copenhagen, Denmark, rated 3 stars in the Michelin guide, and named Best Restaurant in the World by Restaurant

Restaurant guides review restaurants, often ranking them or providing information to guide consumers (type of food, handicap accessibility, facilities, etc.). One of the most famous contemporary guides is the Michelin series of guides which accord one to three stars to restaurants they perceive to be of high culinary merit. Restaurants with stars in the Michelin guide are formal, expensive establishments; in general the more stars awarded, the higher the prices.

The main competitor to the Michelin guide in Europe is the guidebook series published by Gault Millau. Its ratings are on a scale of 1 to 20, with 20 being the highest.

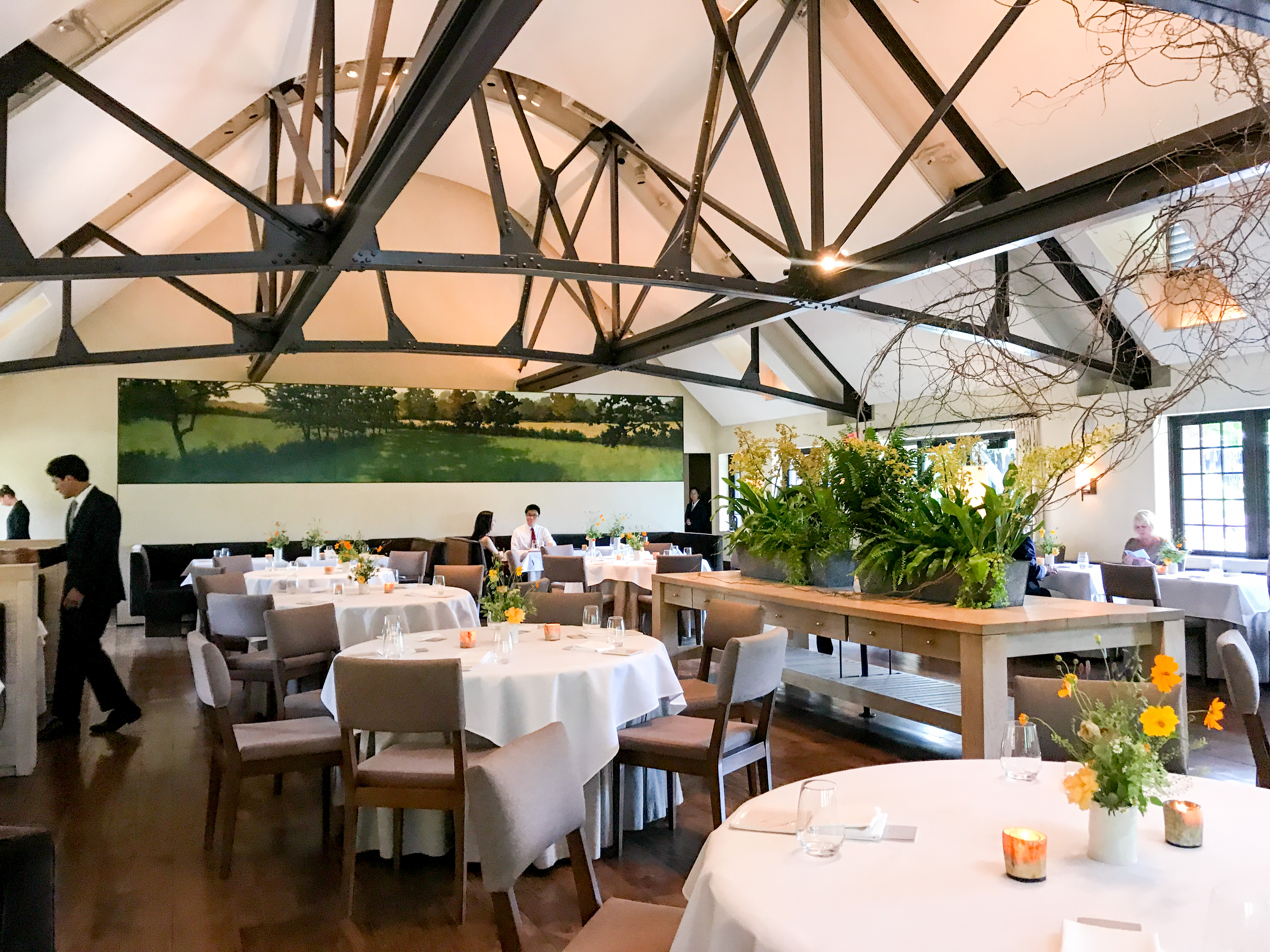
Blue Hill at Stone Barns in Pocantico Hills, New York has two Michelin stars.

In the United States, the Forbes Travel Guide (previously the Mobil travel guides) and the AAA rate restaurants on a similar 1 to 5 star (Forbes) or diamond (AAA) scale. Three, four, and five star/diamond ratings are roughly equivalent to the Michelin one, two, and three star ratings while one and two star ratings typically indicate more casual places to eat. In 2005, Michelin released a New York City guide, its first for the United States. The popular Zagat Survey compiles individuals' comments about restaurants but does not pass an "official" critical assessment.

Nearly all major American newspapers employ food critics and publish online dining guides for the cities they serve. Some news sources provide customary reviews of restaurants, while others may provide more of a general listings service.

More recently Internet sites have started up that publish both food critic reviews and popular reviews by the general public.

== Economics ==
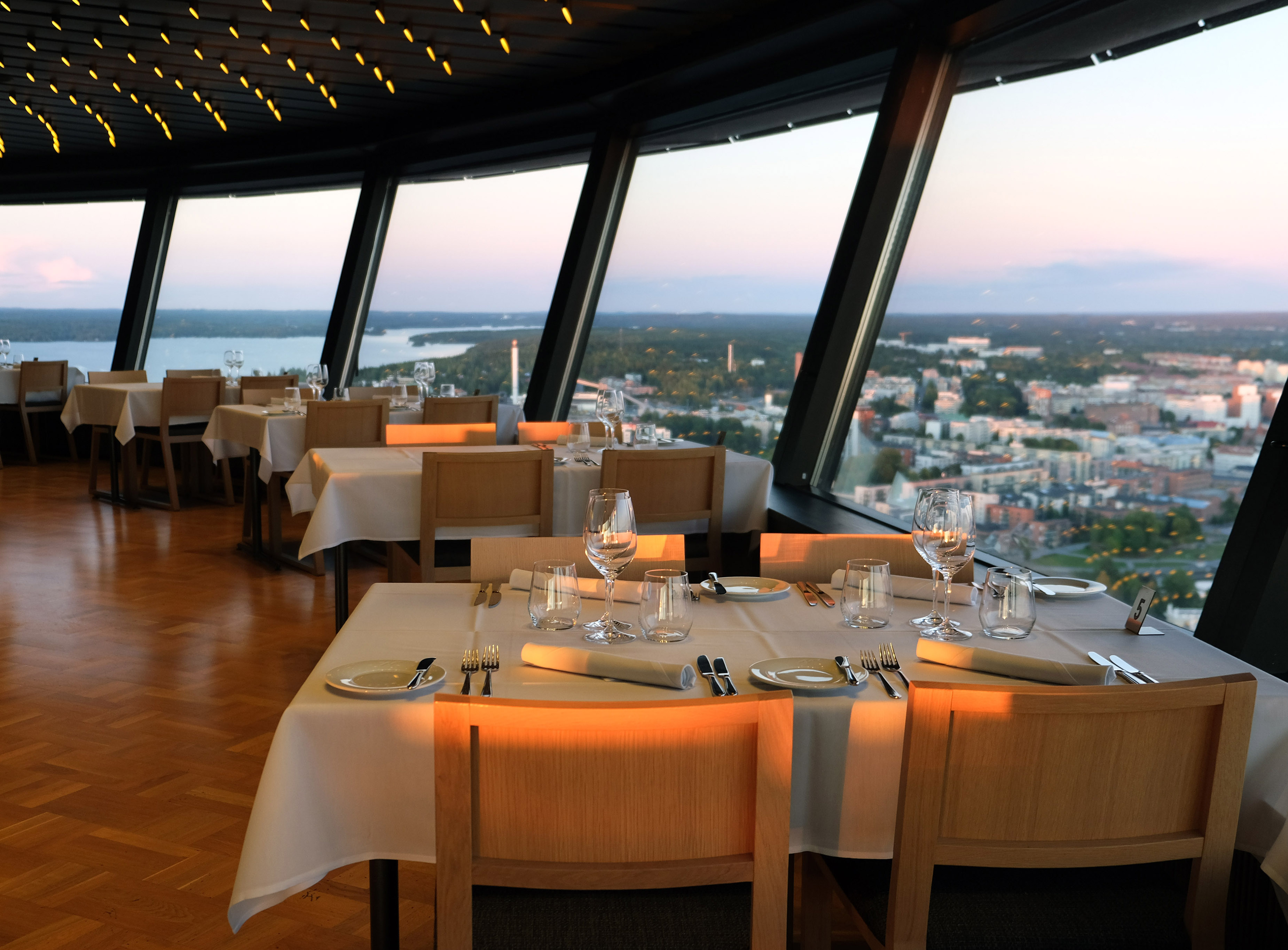
Restaurant Näsinneula in Tampere, Finland

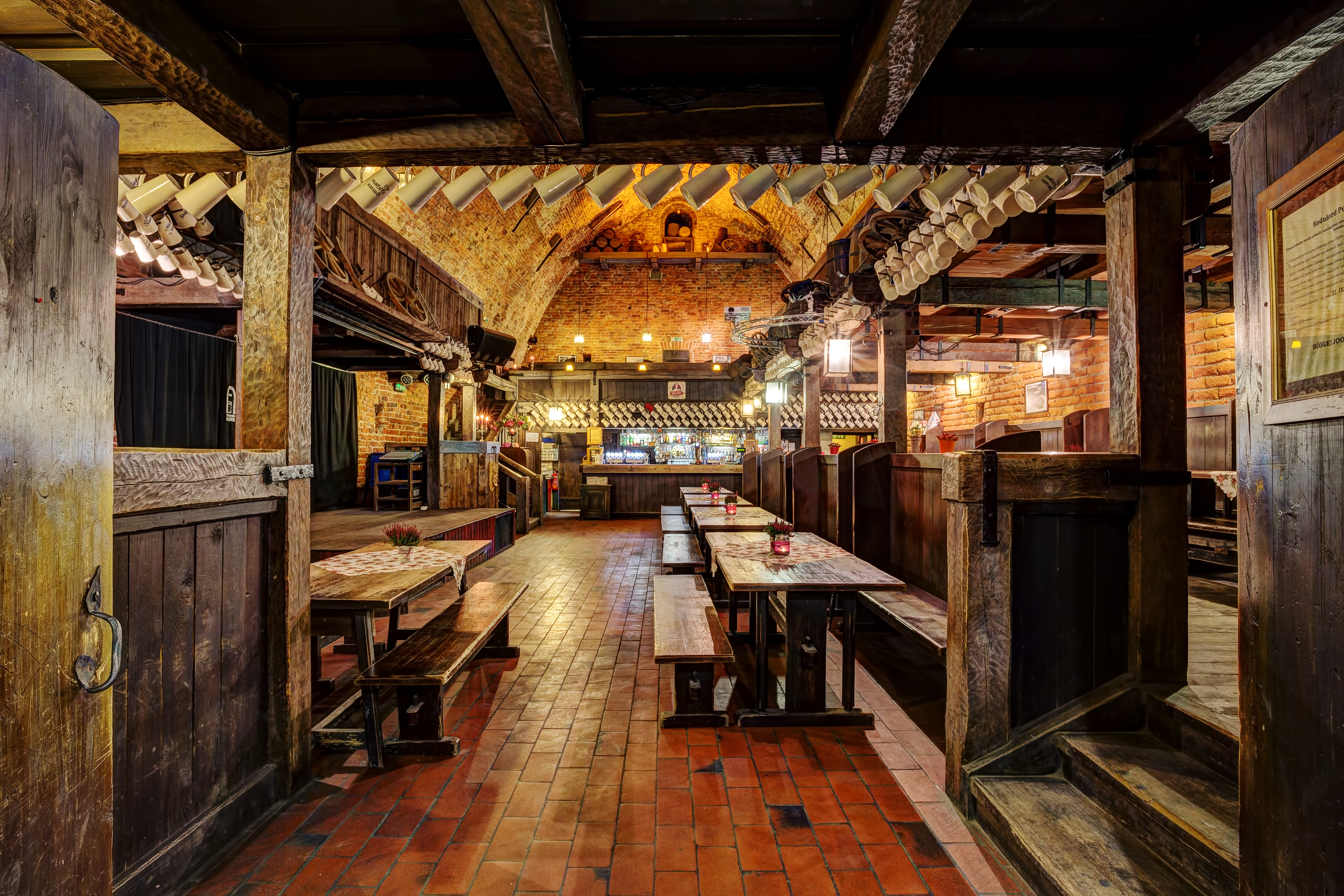
Gunpowder Cellar of Tartu, a former 18th-century gunpowder cellar and current beer restaurant in Tartu, Estonia

=== Canada ===
There are 86,915 commercial food service units in Canada, or 26.4 units per 10,000 Canadians. By segment, there are:

- 38,797 full-service restaurants
- 34,629 limited-service restaurants
- 741 contract and social caterers
- 6,749 drinking places

Fully 63% of restaurants in Canada are independent brands. Chain restaurants account for the remaining 37%, and many of these are locally owned and operated franchises.

=== European Union ===
The EU-27 has an estimated 1.6 million businesses involved in 'accommodation & food services', more than 75% of which are small and medium enterprises.

=== India ===
The Indian restaurant industry is highly fragmented with more than 1.5 million outlets of which only around 3,000 of them are from the organised segment. The organised segment includes quick service restaurants; casual dining; cafes; fine dining; and pubs, bars, clubs and lounges.

=== Vietnam ===
The restaurant industry in Vietnam is one of the important economic sectors, making a significant contribution to the national economy. According to the General Statistics Office of Vietnam, the number of restaurants in Vietnam has increased rapidly from 2000 to 2022. In 2000, there were about 20,000 restaurants nationwide, but by 2022, this number had increased to over 400,000 restaurants. The average annual growth rate is about 10%. The restaurant industry in Vietnam has also seen strong growth in recent years. According to a report by SSI Securities Corporation, the revenue of the restaurant industry in Vietnam reached VND610 trillion in 2022, up 16% from 2021. Of that, the out-of-home market accounted for VND333.69 trillion, up 19% from 2021.

=== United States ===
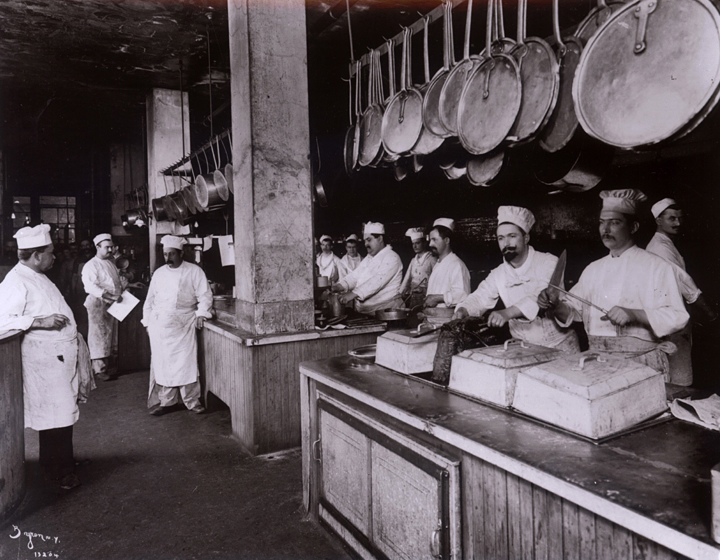
The kitchen at Delmonico's Restaurant, New York City, 1902

As of 2006, there are approximately 215,000 full-service restaurants in the United States, accounting for $298 billion in sales, and approximately 250,000 limited-service (fast food) restaurants, accounting for $260 billion. Starting in 2016, Americans spent more on restaurants than groceries. In October 2017, The New York Times reported there are 620,000 eating and drinking places in the United States, according to the Bureau of Labour Statistics. They also reported that the number of restaurants are growing almost twice as fast as the population.

One study of new restaurants in Cleveland, Ohio found that 1 in 4 changed ownership or went out of business after one year, and 6 out of 10 did so after three years. (Not all changes in ownership are indicative of financial failure.) The three-year failure rate for franchises was nearly the same.

Restaurants employed 912,100 cooks in 2013, earning an average $9.83 per hour. The waiting staff numbered 4,438,100 in 2012, earning an average $8.84 per hour.

Jiaxi Lu of the Washington Post reports in 2014 that, "Americans are spending $683.4 billion a year dining out, and they are also demanding better food quality and greater variety from restaurants to make sure their money is well spent."

Dining in restaurants has become increasingly popular, with the proportion of meals consumed outside the home in restaurants or institutions rising from 25% in 1950 to 46% in 1990. This is caused by factors such as the growing numbers of older people, who are often unable or unwilling to cook their meals at home and the growing number of single-parent households. It is also caused by the convenience that restaurants can afford people; the growth of restaurant popularity is also correlated with the growing length of the work day in the US, as well as the growing number of single parent households. Eating in restaurants has also become more popular with the growth of higher income households. At the same time, less expensive establishments such as fast food establishments can be quite inexpensive, making restaurant eating accessible to many.

==== Employment ====
The restaurant industry in the United States is large and quickly growing, with 10 million workers. 1 in every 12 U.S. residents work in the business, and during the 2008 recession, the industry was an anomaly in that it continued to grow. Restaurants are known for having low wages, which they claim are due to thin profit margins of 4-5%. For comparison, however, Walmart has a 1% profit margin. As a result of these low wages, restaurant employees suffer from three times the poverty rate as other U.S. workers, and use food stamps twice as much. Restaurants are the largest employer of people of color, and rank as the second largest employer of immigrants. These workers statistically are concentrated in the lowest paying positions in the restaurant industry. In the restaurant industry, 39% of workers earn minimum wage or lower.

== Regulations ==
In many countries, restaurants are subject to inspections by health inspectors to maintain standards for public health, such as maintaining proper hygiene and cleanliness. The most common kind of violations of inspection reports are those concerning the storage of cold food at appropriate temperatures, proper sanitation of equipment, regular hand washing and proper disposal of harmful chemicals. Simple steps can be taken to improve sanitation in restaurants. As sickness is easily spread through touch, restaurants are encouraged to regularly wipe down tables, door knobs and menus.

Depending on local customs, legislation and the establishment, restaurants may or may not serve alcoholic beverages. Restaurants are often prohibited from selling alcoholic beverages without a meal by alcohol sale laws; such sale is considered to be an activity for bars, which are meant to have more severe restrictions. Some restaurants are licensed to serve alcohol ("fully licensed"), or permit customers to "bring your own booze" (BYO / BYOB). In some places restaurant licenses may restrict service to beer, or wine and beer.

== Occupational hazards ==
Food service regulations have historically been built around hygiene and protection of the consumer's health. However, restaurant workers face many health hazards such as long hours, low wages, minimal benefits, discrimination, high stress, and poor working conditions. Along with the COVID-19 pandemic, much attention has been drawn to the prevention of community transmission in restaurants and other public settings. To reduce airborne disease transmission, the Centers for Disease Control and Prevention recommends reduced dining capacity, face masks, adequate ventilation, physical barrier instalments, disinfection, signage, and flexible leave policies for workers.

== See also ==
- Lists of restaurants
