= Rouennaise sauce =

Type of French brown sauce made with duck liver

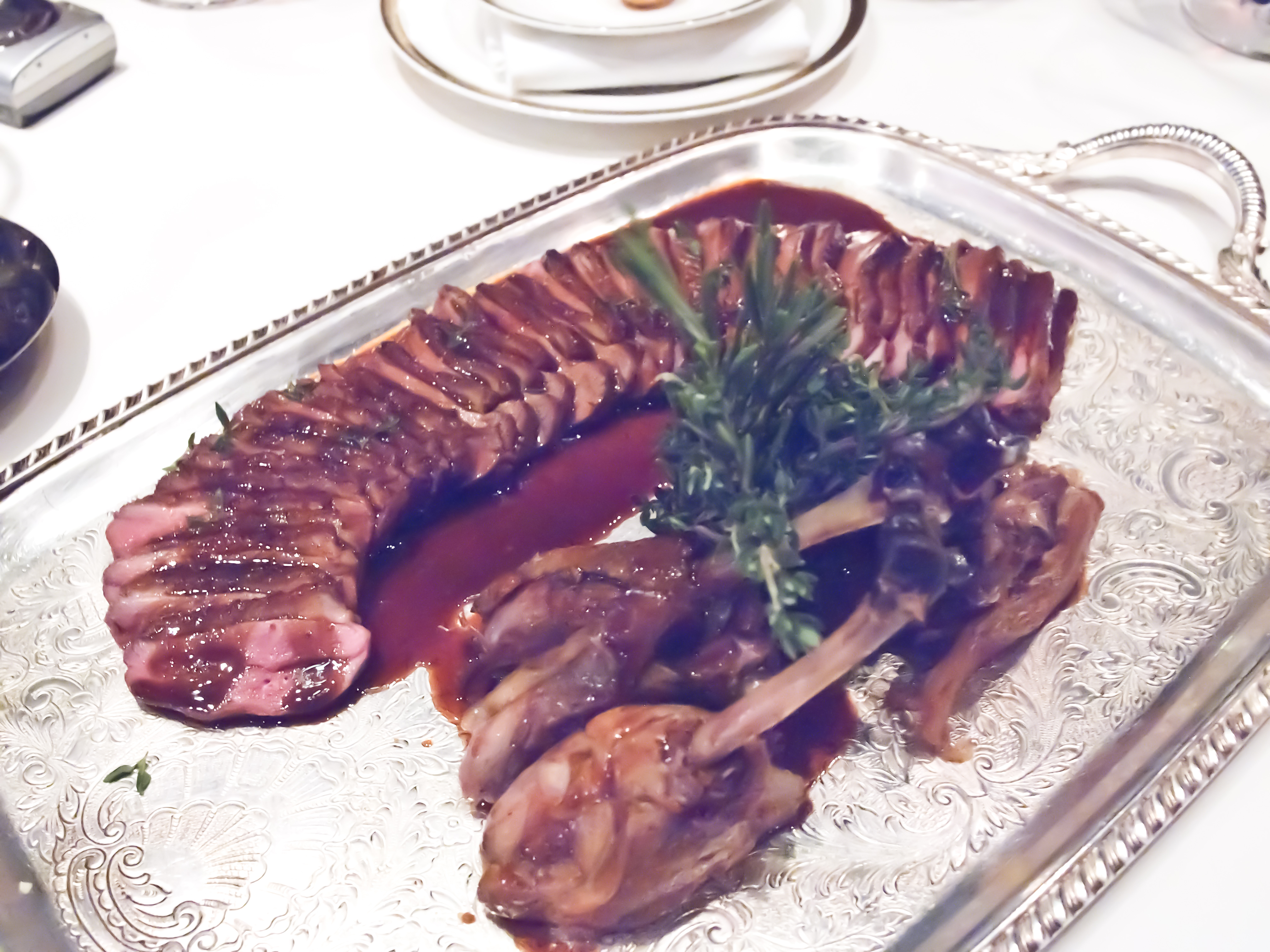
- Caneton Rouennais à la Presse, Escoffier's classic pressed duck served with Sauce Rouennaise
- Type: Sauce
- Place of origin: France
- Region or state: Rouen, Normandy
- Main ingredients: wine, shallots, brown stock, duck liver

Rouennaise sauce (French: Sauce Rouennaise) is a variation of the classic Bordelaise sauce with the addition of puréed duck liver originating from the Rouen, Normandy. The pureed liver gives the sauce a gamey flavor.

This sauce is served with Canetons à la Rouennaise, which was one of the dishes served at the famous "Dinner of the Three Emperors".

== Name and history ==
The name of the sauce comes from the history city, Rouen in Normandy known for duck dishes. It is often associated with the famous pressed duck where blood and juices are extracted from a half-roasted duck using a special press.

The dish originated in from 19th century in Normandy.The preparation was popularized in the 19th century at restaurants such as La Couronne in Rouen and La Tour d'Argent in Paris.

== Preparation ==
Auguste Escoffier's Le Guide Culinaire (1903) gives very specific instructions on how to prepare the sauce. According to the book, the preparation starts by making a sauce bordelaise. Add pureed liver into the sauce. Afterward, simmer the sauce gently to incorporate the liver into the sauce.

In some variations, blood and juices from the pressed duck are added into the sauce.

== See also ==
- Auguste Escoffier
- Bordelaise sauce
- Duck as food
- Pressed duck
