= Breton sauce =

French compound sauce

Breton sauce (fr. sauce bretonne) is a French compound sauce consisting of a velouté base with julienned onion, leeks, celery heart and mushrooms, mounted with butter and cream. It has been referred to as a brown version of sauce soubise, which has as its base a béchamel sauce.

Puréed fava beans bound with a sauce bretonne were served as an accompaniment to roast saddle of mutton at the famously extravagant Three Emperors Dinner at the Café Anglais in 1867.
