= Pommes Anna =

French dish

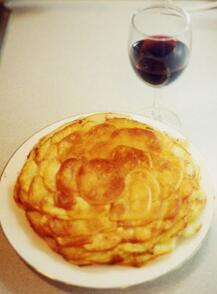
- Alternative names: Anna potatoes
- Place of origin: France
- Main ingredients: Potatoes, butter

Pommes Anna, or Anna potatoes, is a classic French dish of sliced, layered potatoes cooked in a very large amount of melted butter. There are several variants of the dish, containing, in addition to potatoes and butter, other ingredients, which may include artichoke hearts, black truffles, mushrooms and cheese.

== Ingredients ==
The recipe calls for firm-fleshed potatoes and butter only. Potatoes are peeled and sliced very thin. The slices, salted and peppered, are layered into a pan (see below), generously doused with clarified butter, and baked until they form a cake. Then the cake is flipped every ten minutes until the outside is golden and crisp. At the end of the cooking period, the dish is unmoulded and forms a cake 15 to 20 centimetres (6 to 8 in) in diameter and about five centimetres (2 in) high. It is then cut in wedges and served immediately on a hot plate, usually accompanying cooked meat.

A special double baking dish made of copper called la cocotte à pommes Anna is still manufactured in France for the cooking of this dish. It consists of upper and lower halves which fit into each other so that the whole vessel with its contents can be inverted during cooking.

== History ==
The dish is generally credited with having been created during the reign of Napoleon III by the chef Adolphe Dugléré, a leading pupil of Carême. Dugléré was head chef at the Café Anglais, the most fashionable restaurant in Paris during the Second Empire, and reputedly named the dish for one of the grandes cocottes (society beauties) of the period. There is disagreement about which beauty the dish was named after: the actress Anna Judic or Anna Deslions. In Mastering the Art of French Cooking, Simone Beck and Julia Child comment that to many people, "pommes Anna is the supreme potato dish of all time".

Traditionally, Pommes Anna accompanies sirloin of beef à la française (roast and garnished with tartlets filled with spinach purée) or Cavour (sautéed, blanched beef marrow slices on top), or du couvent (browned, braised in white wine and demi-glace mixed with truffle, ox tongue, mushroom strips and peas). The dish is also a traditional accompaniment to tournedos steaks, such as Armenonville (garnished with creamed morels; deglazed with Madeira and veal gravy), à la basque (with stuffed tomatoes, and creamed celery), carignan (with artichoke hearts and asparagus), and Louis XV (garnished with a tartlet filled with minced mushrooms with a truffle slice on top and served with tournedos covered with sauce à la diable). Pommes Anna is also served with sautéed chicken dishes such as Rivoli (deglazed with sherry, demi-glace and tomato purée, with chopped truffles), and with veal, such as longe de veau à la française (roast loin, with creamed spinach and Madeira sauce).

== Variants ==
- Pommes Darphin – as for pommes Anna but with the potatoes cut into juliennes rather than slices. Also known as pommes Nana.
- Pommes Massenet – as for pommes Anna, but the layers of potato are alternated with previously sautéed mushrooms.
- Pommes Mireille – as for pommes Anna, but with a layer of black truffles and a layer of sliced artichoke hearts between the layers of potato.
- Pommes Monselet – as for pommes Anna, but with layers of mushrooms and truffles in between the layers of sliced potato.
- Pommes Salardaise – as for pommes Anna, but the layers of potato are alternated with sliced black truffles.
- Pommes Voisin – as for pommes Anna, with grated cheese over each layer of potato.

== See also ==
- List of foods named after people

== Sources ==
- Beck, Simone; Julia Child (1978). Mastering the Art of French Cooking, Volume 2. London: Penguin. ISBN 978-0-14-046221-0.
- Bickel, Walter (1989). Hering's Dictionary of Classical and Modern Cookery (eleventh ed.). London: Virtue. ISBN 978-3-8057-0307-9.
- Escoffier, Auguste (1907) [1903]. Le guide culinaire: aide-mémoire de cuisine pratique (in French) (second ed.). Paris: Émile Colin. OCLC 969508192.
- Saulnier, Louis (1978) [1923]. Le répertoire de la cuisine (fourteenth ed.). London: Jaeggi. OCLC 1086737491.
- Verdon, René (1985). The Enlightened Cuisine: A Master Chef's Step-by-Step Guide to Contemporary French Cooking. New York: Macmillan. ISBN 0-02-621750-3.
