= Three Emperors Dinner =

1867 Russo-Prussian meeting in Paris

The Dîner des trois empereurs or Three Emperors Dinner was a banquet held at Café Anglais in Paris, France, on 7 June 1867. It consisted of 16 courses with eight wines served over eight hours.

== Overview ==
The Three Emperors Dinner was prepared by chef Adolphe Dugléré at the request of King William I of Prussia who frequented the cafe during the Exposition Universelle. He requested a meal to be remembered and at which no expense was to be spared for himself and his guests, Tsar Alexander II of Russia, plus his son the Tsarevitch (who later became Tsar Alexander III), and Otto von Bismarck.

The name "Three Emperors Dinner" is something of a misnomer and apparently was applied retrospectively (apparently in analogy to the Battle of the Three Emperors), as only Alexander II bore the title of Emperor at the time. Wilhelm I would not be proclaimed Kaiser (Emperor) until 1871, whereas Alexander III would only ascend the Imperial Russian throne in 1881 after his father's assassination.

The cellar master, Claudius Burdel, was instructed to accompany the dishes with the greatest wines in the world, including a Roederer champagne in a special lead glass bottle, so Tsar Alexander could admire the bubbles and golden colour.

The banquet consisted of 16 courses with eight wines served over eight hours. The cost of the meal was 400 francs per person (over €9,000 in 2013 prices). The high price of the wines served contributed to the expense of the meal.

At 1 o'clock in the morning, Tsar Alexander is reported to have complained that the meal had not contained foie gras. Burdel explained that it was not the custom in French cuisine to eat foie gras in June. The following October, he was sent three terrines of foie gras made by Dugléré as a gift.

The table used for the banquet and a copy of the menu is on display at La Tour d'Argent restaurant in Paris.

== Menu ==
The menu included the following, among the 16 courses:

MENU

Potages

Impératrice
Fontanges

Relevés

Soufflé à la reine
Filets de sole à la vénitienne
Escalope de turbot au gratin
Selle de mouton purée Bretonne

Entrées

Poulet à la portugaise
Pâté chaud de cailles
Homard à la parisienne

Digérer
Sorbets au champagne

Rôts

Canetons à la rouennaise
Ortolans sur canapés

Entremets

Aubergines à l'espagnole
Asperges en branches
Cassolette princesse

Dessert

Bombe glacée
Fruit

VINS

Madère retour de l'Inde 1810
Xérès 1821
Châteaux d'Yquem 1847
Chambertin 1846
Châteaux Margaux 1847
Château Latour 1847
Châteaux Lafite 1848
Champagne Roederer frappé

Potage impératrice consists of a chicken stock thickened with tapioca and finished with egg yolks and cream, to which poached rounds of chicken forcemeat, cockscombs, cocks' kidneys and green peas are added.
Potage fontanges is a purée of fresh peas diluted with consommé with the addition of a chiffonade of sorrel and sprigs of chervil.
Soufflé à la reine is a chicken soufflé with truffles
Sauce vénitienne is a sauce of white wine, tarragon vinegar, shallots and chervil, mounted with butter and finished with chopped chervil and tarragon.
Selle de mouton purée Bretonne is saddle of mutton with a purée of broad beans bound with Breton sauce.
Poulet à la portugaise is whole chicken roasted with a covering of adobo paste consisting of tomato, red bell pepper, garlic, origanum, paprika, cayenne pepper, brown sugar, lemon juice, white wine, chicken stock and olive oil, stuffed with tomato flavoured rice.
Pâté chaud de cailles is warm pâté of quail.
Homard à la parisienne is lobster cooked in court bouillon, cut into slices and glazed with aspic, with a garnish of tomatoes stuffed with a macédoine of vegetables, dressed with a mixture of mayonnaise and aspic and garnished with sliced truffle.
Canetons à la rouennaise is a dish of roast duckling stuffed with forcemeat. The legs and breasts are removed, the legs are grilled and the breasts are thinly sliced and arranged around the stuffing. The remaining carcass is pressed in a poultry press to extract all the juices and is added to a Rouennaise sauce, which is poured over the sliced duck. (This dish is today the speciality of the house at La Tour d'Argent.)
Ortolans sur canapés, ortolans (now a protected species) on toast.
Aubergines à l'espagnole is a dish of aubergine shells filled with chopped aubergine, tomato and ham and a gruyère gratin.
Cassolette princesse, (a.k.a. Cassolette argenteuil), A cassolette with a border of duchesse potatoes and an asparagus filling in cream sauce.
Bombe glacée is an ice cream dessert.

– Source:

== Re-creation ==
Australian chef Shannon Bennett attempted to recreate the banquet in 2002. It took six months to plan and required some changes due to key ingredients and wines no longer being available. Even using the nearest modern equivalent ingredients and wines, the cost of the meal was AUS$7,500 per person. The Australian Broadcasting Corporation broadcast the documentary Three Emperors Dinner about the original banquet and the modern recreation in 2003.

== See also ==
- Manchu-Han Imperial Feast
- Banquet of Chestnuts
- List of dining events
- Nobel Banquet

== Gallery ==
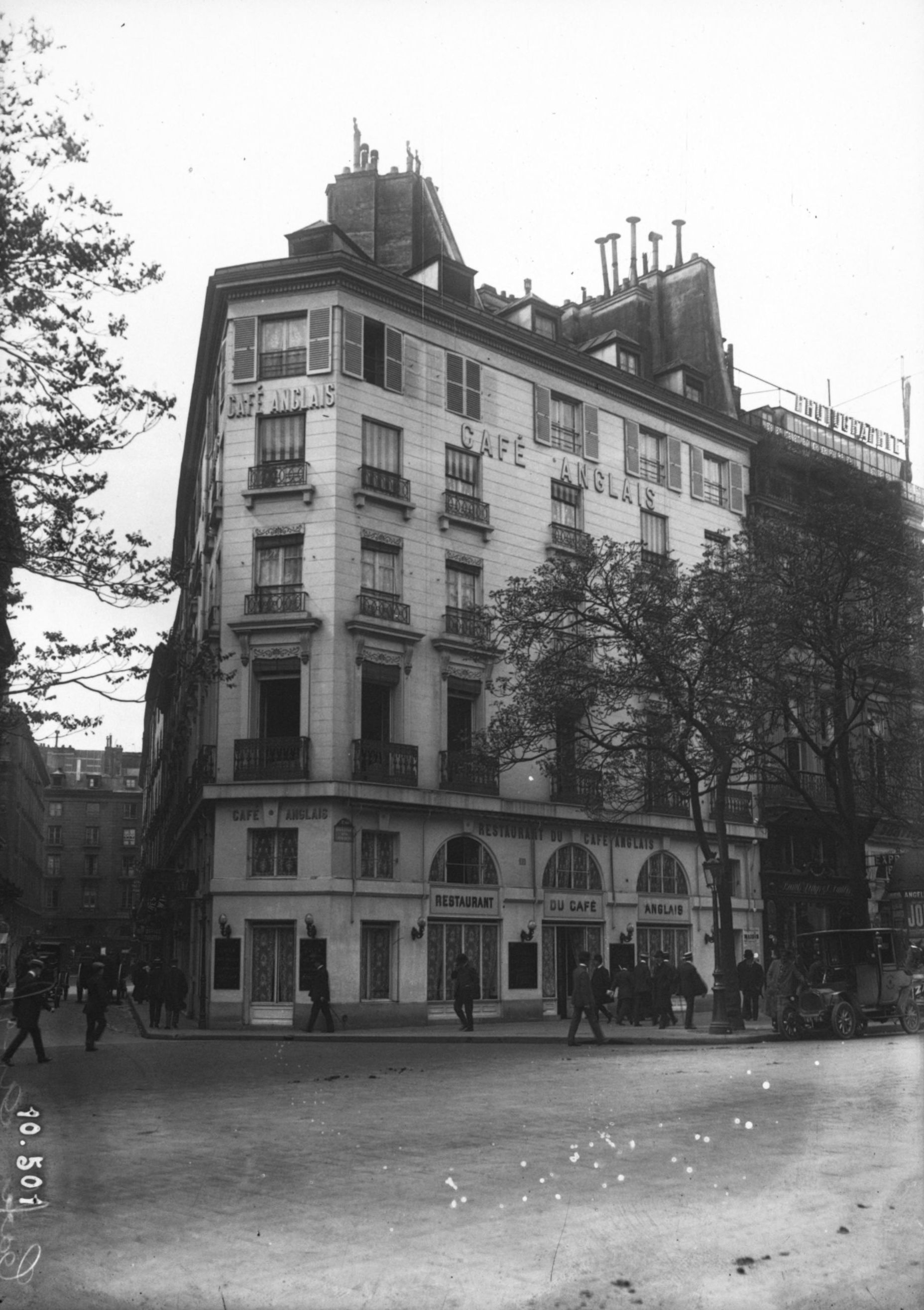
Café Anglais in 1913

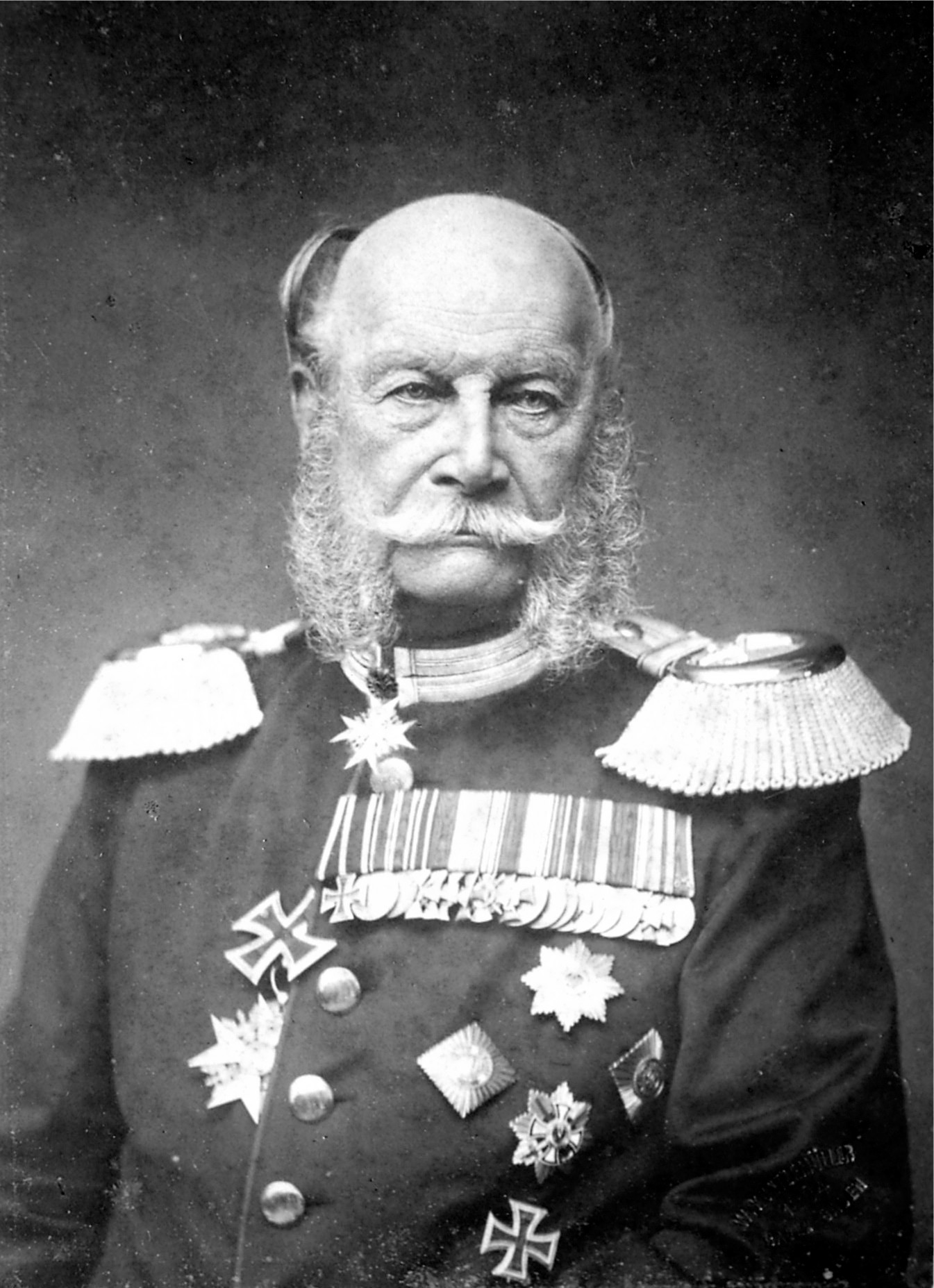
King William I of Prussia

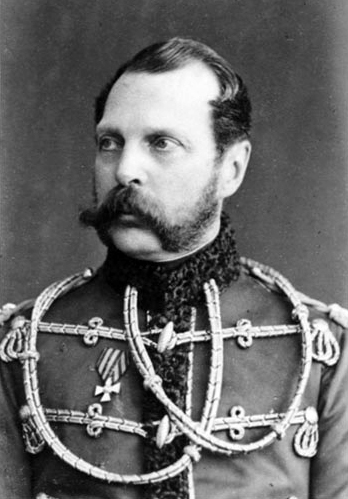
Tsar Alexander II of Russia

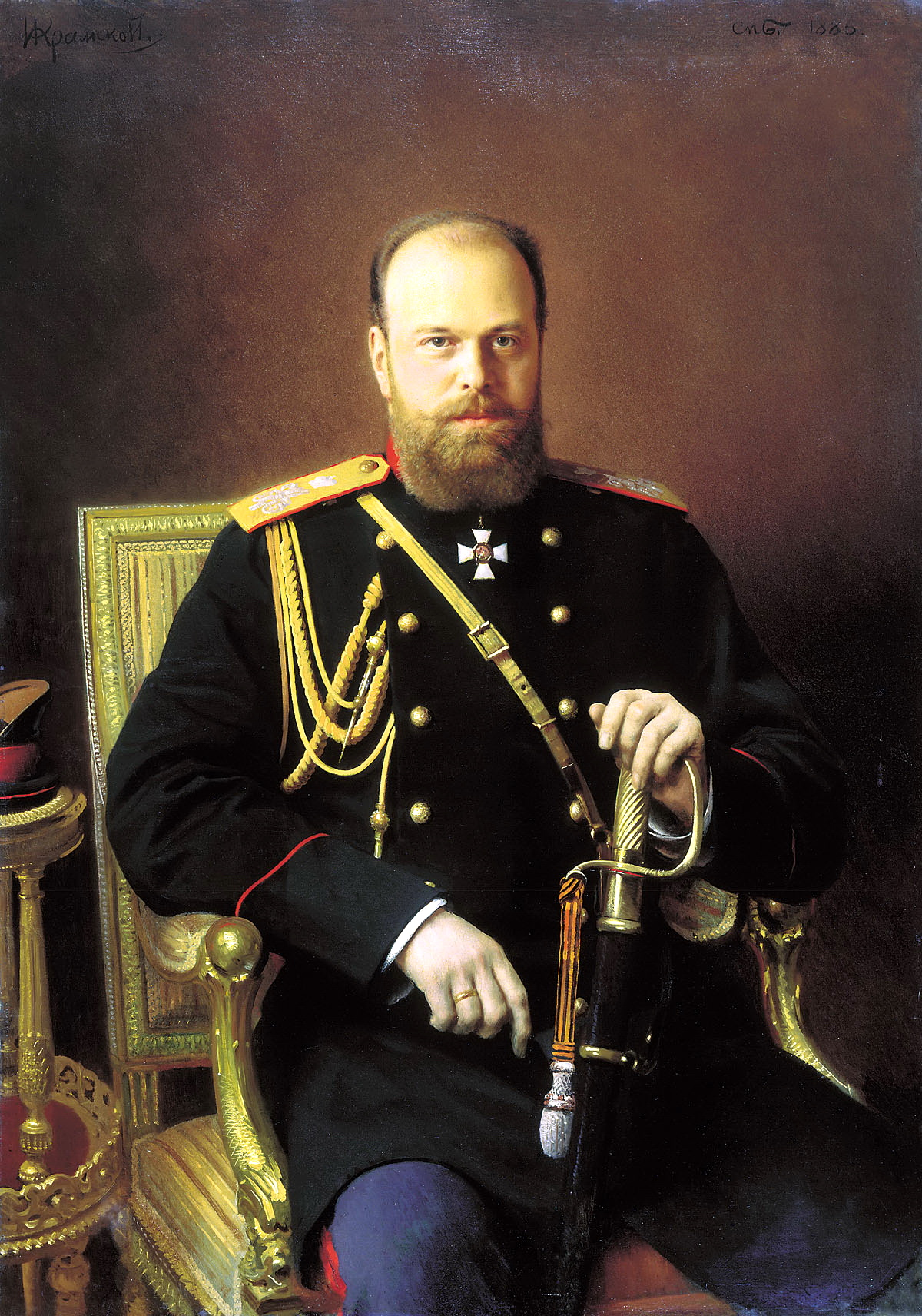
Tsarevich Alexander
(later Tsar Alexander III)

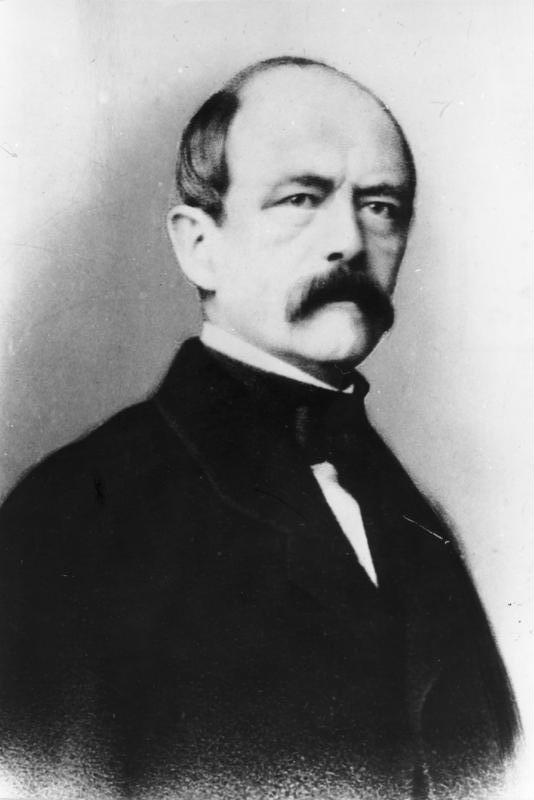
Otto von Bismarck
