= La Couronne (restaurant) =

- Restaurant façade
- Interactive map of La Couronne

Restaurant information
- Established: 1345
- Head chef: Vincent Taillefer
- Food type: French cuisine
- Location: 31 place du Vieux-Marché, Rouen, Normandy, France
- Coordinates: 49.442753°N 1.087805°E
- Seating capacity: Up to 120
- Website: www.lacouronne-rouen.fr

La Couronne, established in 1345, is considered the oldest inn in France. It is located on the Place du Vieux-Marché in Rouen, the capital of Normandy.

== History ==
=== Medieval origins and archival records ===
The documented history of the inn is based on the G and H archival series in the departmental archives of Seine-Maritime, drawn from the collections of the Saint-Lô Priory, the parish of Saint-Sauveur, and the community of the Filles-Dieu of Rouen.

Three medieval land rents trace the development of the property:

- In 1345, a deed recorded in the cartulary of the Filles-Dieu indicates that Vincent de Saint-Liénart sold messire Robert Le Huc, a priest, an annuity secured on a house named the manoir à La Couronne, located along the paved market where fish was sold. In 1359, a charter granted by Charles, Dauphin and Regent of France, confirmed this property to the nuns.
- By 1365, the accounts of the Saint-Lô Priory note an annuity of two sols paid by Raoul Leprévost, identified as "master" of La Couronne, which was later remitted around 1367 by Nicole Thomas.
- On 11 May 1387, a third perpetual rent of ten sols was established for the neighboring Saint-Sauveur church by Dame Nicole, widow of Pierre Le Clerc. Known as the "Dame Nicole" rent, it was remitted annually by the inn for more than four centuries until the parish was suppressed during the French Revolution in 1791.

According to local tradition, tavern keeper Raoul Baudry witnessed the execution of Joan of Arc from the building's windows on 30 May 1431. Notarial records show that in 1443, his son Richard Baudry (nicknamed "Cardinot") succeeded his father Guillaume as tavern keeper of the business. A document from 1483 places the property opposite the Vieux-Marché market hall where fresh fish was sold.

In the 17th century, Abraham Houppeville, the owner of the inn and churchwarden of Saint-Sauveur in 1626, remitted the ground rent through parish accounts signed by local figures, including members of the Corneille family. In 1651, poet and playwright Pierre Corneille, then the churchwarden in charge, countersigned the receipt for the ten sols due by Houppeville's widow for the property displaying the sign of the "Golden Crown" (Couronne d'or).

=== Contemporary period ===
Until the early 20th century, the inn occupied a classical ashlar and roughcast building adjoining the café-tobacconist À la Civette du Vieux-Marché and the Fréret & Levieux warehouses. In 1919, following his military discharge, Lucien Dorin and his brother Marcel purchased the business from M. Meunier, continuing the culinary tradition established by Marie Hallé. Marcel Dorin later worked in Paris at the restaurant Le Bœuf à la mode, while Lucien managed the wine cellars in Rouen. Their house specialties included sole with cream sauce, canard à la rouennaise (pressed duck), and poulet à la ficelle (string-roasted chicken) adapted from a recipe by Alexandre Dumas. In 1935, Lucien Dorin co-founded the Fête du Ventre food festival in Rouen to celebrate Norman gastronomy.

The current half-timbered façade, designed by architect André Robinne, was completed in 1928.

During the Allied bombing of Rouen on 19 April 1944, the rear wing of the property suffered heavy damage, but the carved street façade and vaulted cellars survived intact amid the destroyed square.

On 7 April 1959, following an investigation conducted by food critic Pierre Andrieu, trade publication L'Hôtellerie formally recognized the establishment as the oldest inn in France. The 50,000-franc prize awarded to brothers Pierre and Jean Dorin was donated to the mayor of Rouen, Bernard Tissot, to aid disaster relief in Madagascar following a cyclone.

In 1986, Rouen chef Michel Guéret and chefs from La Couronne co-founded the Ordre des Canardiers, a gastronomic fraternity dedicated to preserving the traditional tableside carving and preparation of duck à la rouennaise.

In 1987, Jean-Dominique Cauvin assumed management of the restaurant and founded the company SNC La Couronne. Despite a major fire in January 1988, the building was restored. Since the early 1990s, the kitchen has been directed by chef Vincent Taillefer.

== Architecture and interiors ==
The front façade on Place du Vieux-Marché, designed in 1928 by André Robinne, features Neo-Norman elements modeled on medieval woodworking, including jettied upper levels, projecting roof trusses, and carved bressummers. The corbels on the ground floor bear carved statues depicting Saint Fortunatus (patron saint of food and gastronomy), Saint James (patron saint of pilgrims), and Saint Winwaloe (associated with apple orchards).

The basement contains medieval vaulted cellars. The upper dining rooms feature carved wood paneling, stained-glass windows depicting Norman heraldry and Joan of Arc, and large brick fireplaces.

The preserved façade of La Couronne after the Allied bombings of April 1944

== Commercial art and promotion ==
During the interwar period, the establishment commissioned advertising materials from the Rouen printing house L. Wolf, founded by Lucien Wolf and later managed by his son Pierre-René Wolf.

Around 1930, Norman artist Georges Conrad produced a historical recreation of the Place du Vieux-Marché as it appeared in the 15th century, highlighting the inn's half-timbered storefront.

Historical reconstruction of the Place du Vieux-Marché in the 15th century by Georges Conrad (c. 1930)

Cover of the promotional booklet published by L. Wolf (c. 1930)

== Notable guests ==
In November 1948, American chef and author Julia Child ate her first meal in France at La Couronne, consisting of oysters, sole meunière, and Chablis; she later credited this lunch as a turning point in her life that inspired her career in French cuisine.

On 14 April 1959, painter Salvador Dalí had lunch at the restaurant with his wife Gala and painter Georges Mathieu, sampling Pont-l'Évêque cheese before presenting his project on Roman law for the Petits Lits Blancs gala.

The restaurant's guestbook and wall galleries record visits by numerous political and cultural figures, including Charles de Gaulle, Emperor Haile Selassie of Ethiopia, French president René Coty, Princess Grace of Monaco, Sophia Loren, John Wayne, Jean Marais, Bourvil, Jean-Paul Sartre, Paul Éluard, Jacques Anquetil, Juan Manuel Fangio, and Serge Gainsbourg.

== See also ==
- Joan of Arc
- Julia Child
- List of oldest companies
- Le Procope
- La Tour d'Argent
