= Pressed duck =

French duck dish

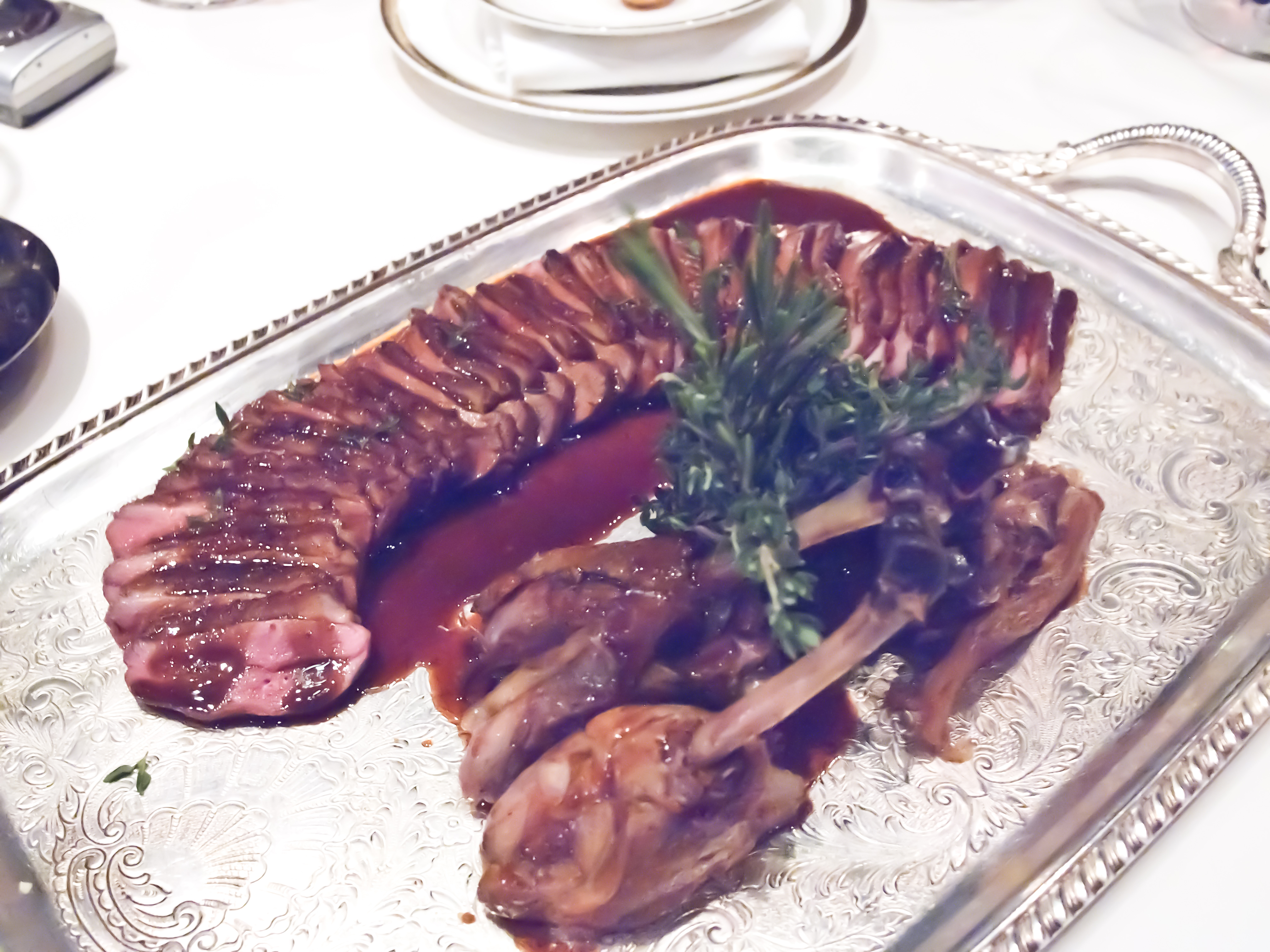
A Rouennaise duckling served with Rouennaise sauce

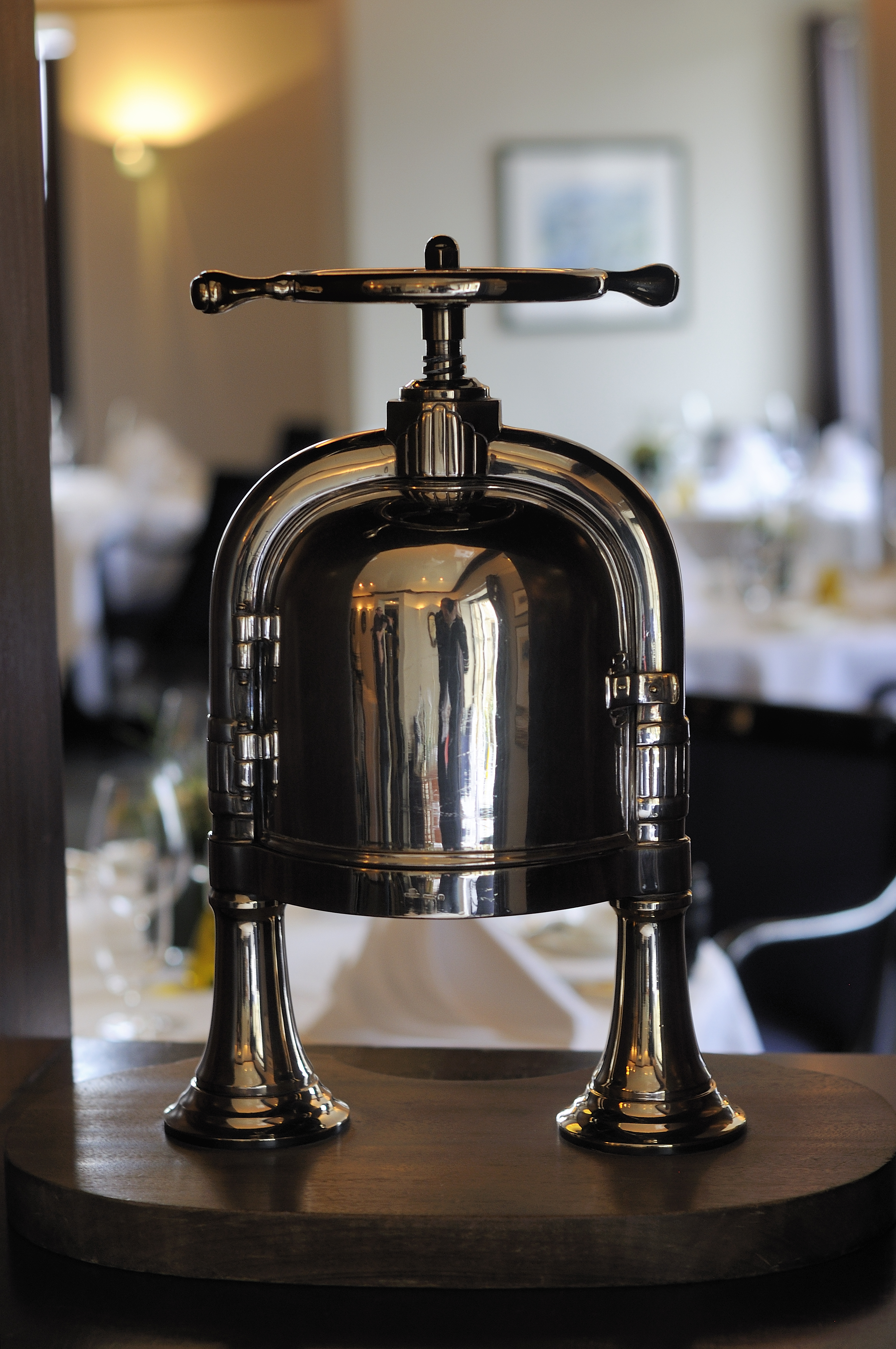
A specially designed press for ducks

Pressed duck (French: canard à la presse, caneton à la presse, canard à la rouennaise, caneton à la rouennaise or canard au sang) is a traditional French dish. The complex dish is a specialty of Rouen and its creation attributed to an innkeeper from the city of Duclair. Since the 19th century, it has also been a specialty of the Tour d'Argent restaurant in Paris where it is formally known as the Caneton Tour d'Argent (Tour d'Argent duckling). It consists of various parts of a duck served in a sauce of its blood and bone marrow, which is extracted by way of a press. It has been considered "the height of elegance".

== Preparation ==
First, a duck (preferably young and plump) is asphyxiated to retain the blood. The duck is then partially roasted. Its liver is ground and seasoned, then the legs and breast are removed.

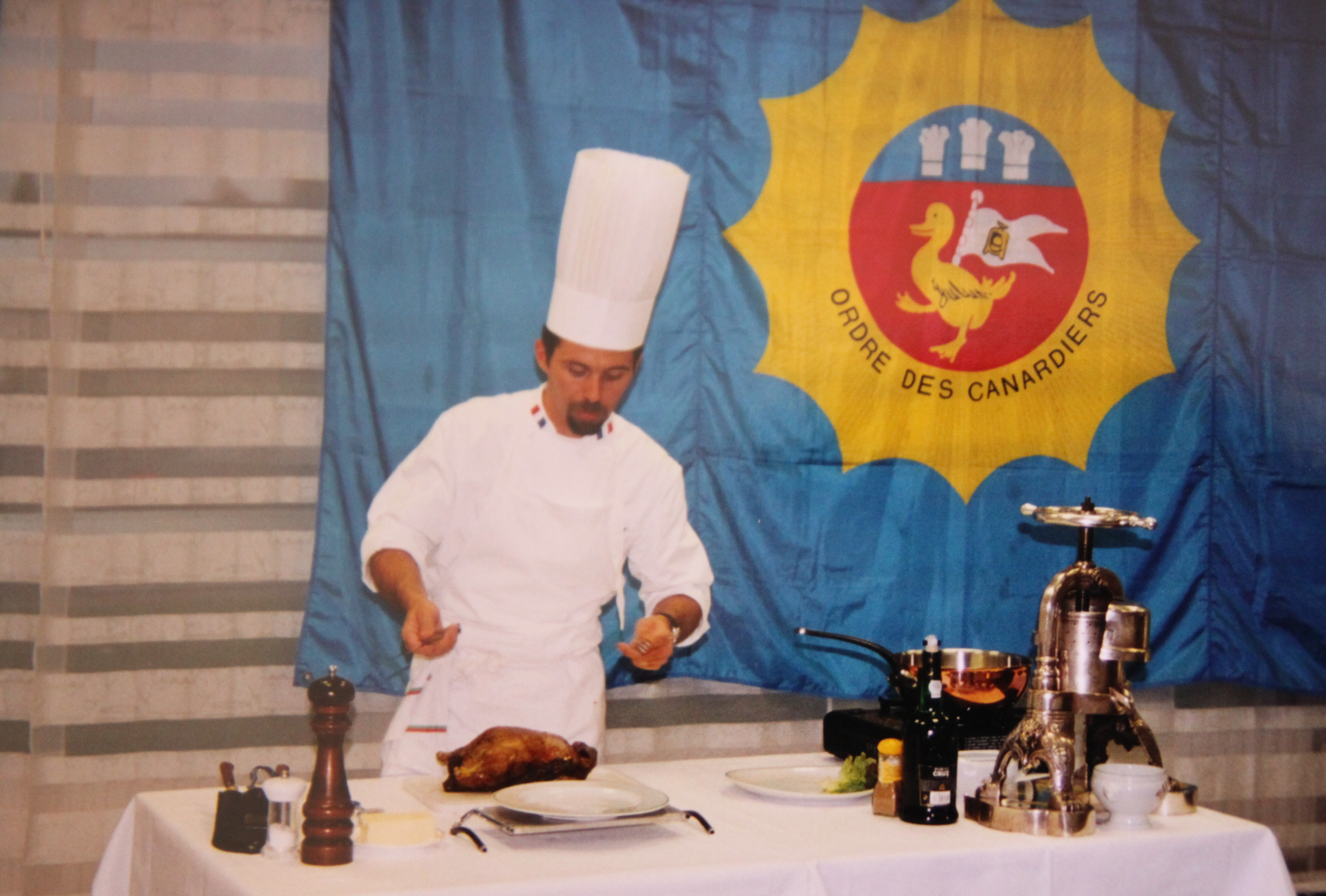
A cook preparing a Rouennaise duck during a competition.

The remaining carcass (including other meat, bones, and skin) is then put in a specially designed press, similar to a wine press. Duck presses tend to be substantial and heavy pieces of equipment, generally made of solid brass or iron. Pressure is then applied to extract duck blood and other juices from the carcass. The extract is thickened and flavoured with the duck's liver, butter, and cognac, then combined with the breast to finish cooking.

=== Sauce ===
Other ingredients that may be added to the sauce include foie gras, port wine, Madeira wine, and lemon. The breast is sliced and served with the sauce in a first serving; the legs are grilled and served as the next course.

== See also ==
- List of duck dishes
- Rouennaise sauce
- Haute cuisine
- La Tour d'Argent
- Sauce gastrique
