= Adolphe Dugléré =

19th-century French chef

- Born: 3 June 1805; Bordeaux
- Died: 4 April 1884 (aged 78); Paris
- Culinary career
- Previous restaurant: Café Anglais

Adolphe Dugléré (French pronunciation: [adɔlf dyɡleʁe]; 3 June 1805 – 4 April 1884) was a French chef and a pupil of Marie-Antoine Carême.

== Les Frères Provençaux ==
Dugléré was a chef de cuisine to the Rothschild family until 1848, and was manager at the restaurant Les Trois Frères Provençaux at the Palais-Royal from 1848 to 1866 which was owned by three men from Provence named Barthélémy, Maneille and Simonas (who were, in reality, not brothers).

== Café Anglais ==
In 1866 he became the head chef of the Café Anglais (founded 1802), which became the most famous Paris restaurant of the 19th century and where he is believed to have created the dish Pommes Anna.

=== Dinner of the Three Emperors ===
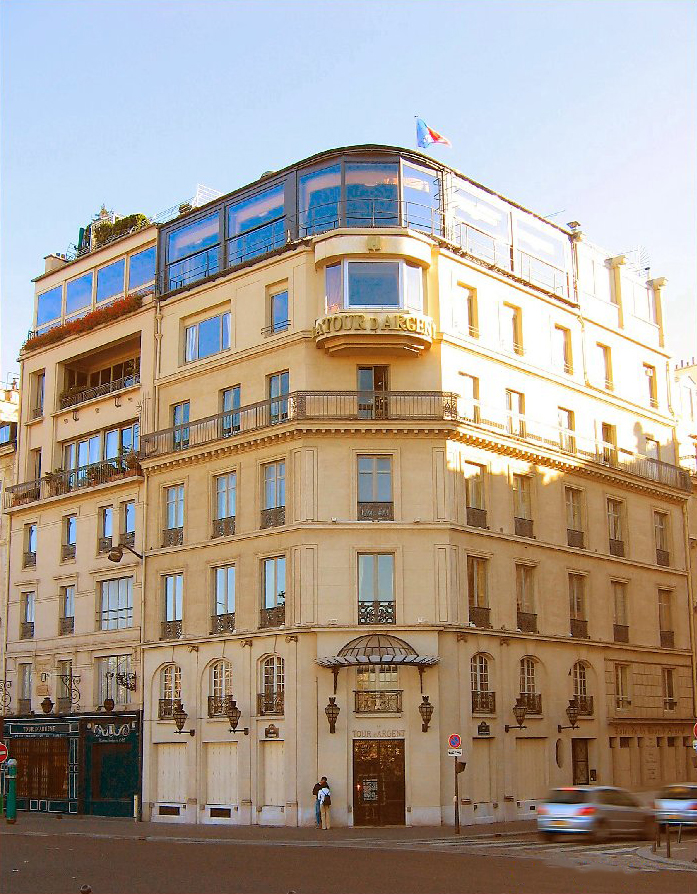
La Tour d'Argent

It was here in 1867 that Dugléré served a famous meal that became known as the Dîner des trois empereurs, ('Dinner of the Three Emperors') for Tsar Alexander II of Russia, his son the tsarevitch (who later became Tsar Alexander III) and King William I of Prussia, as well as Prince Otto von Bismarck who were in Paris for L'Exposition Universelle. The table service used for this meal is on display to this day at the oldest existing restaurant in Paris, Tour d'Argent which is owned by the descendants of Claudius Burdet, the last owner of Café Anglais which was demolished in 1913.

== Dishes ==
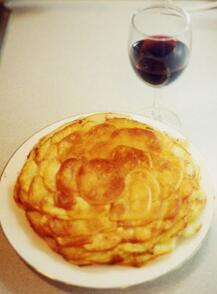
Pommes Anna

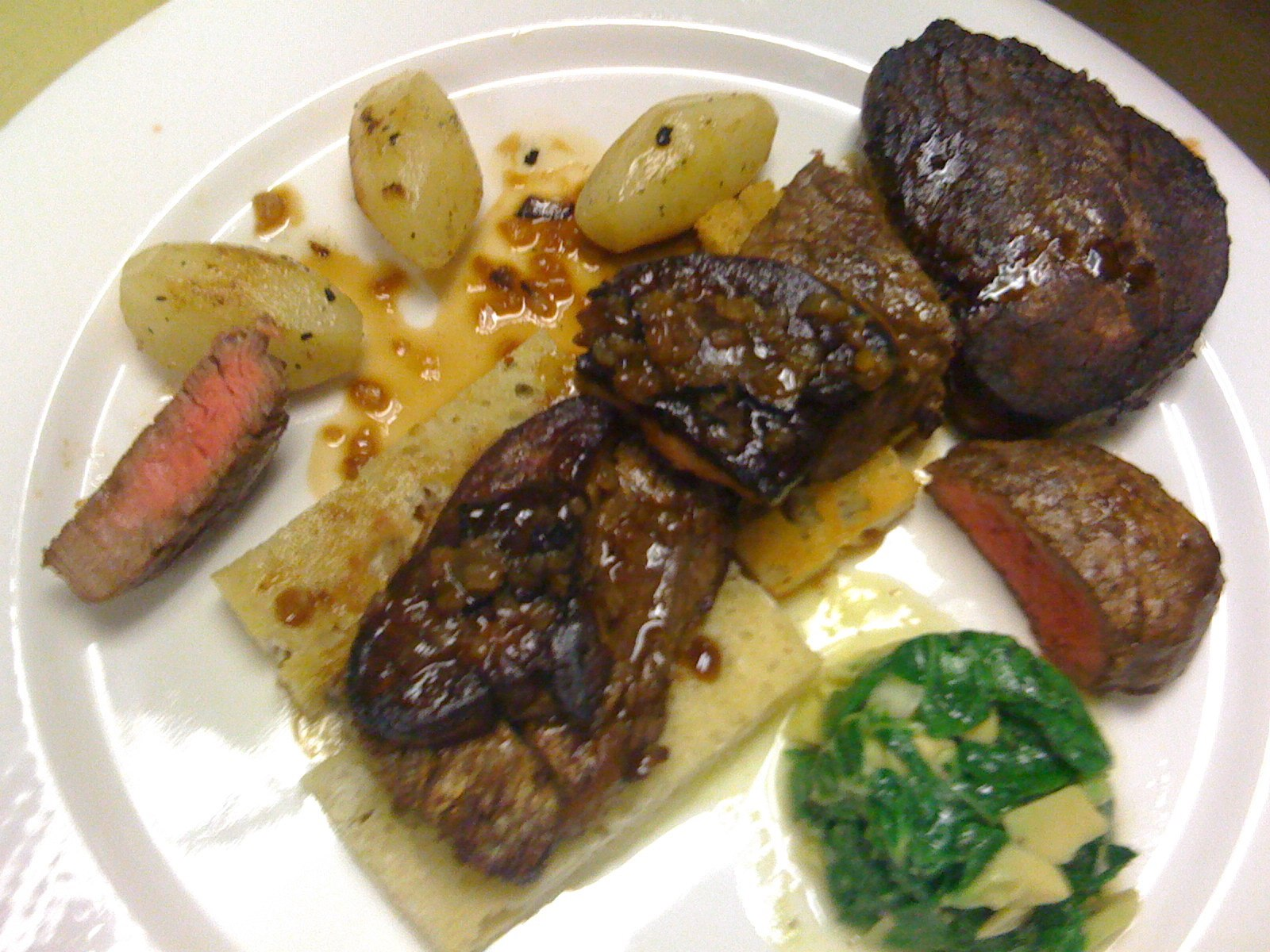
Tournedos Rossini

The most famous dish attributed to Dugléré is almost certainly Pommes Anna. Other dishes created by Dugléré include Potage Germiny, a sorrel soup created for Charles Lebègue, Comte de Germiny, governor of the Bank of France, Poularde Albufera, dedicated to Maréchal Suchet, Duke of Albufera, Soufflé à l'anglaise, (Note: In response to an inquiry, Restaurant de la Tour d'Argent, the current trustees of Dugleré's papers, replied that he left no record of the ingredients in this dish.) Sole Dugléré and Culotte de bœuf Salomon (dedicated to Salomon de Rothschild) and Barbue à la Dugléré (brill in tomato and parsley sauce).

He is also credited with inventing Tournedos Rossini, but this dish has also been credited to both Escoffier as well as Carême (although not the title itself). It was composer Gioachino Rossini who dubbed Dugléré Le Mozart de la cuisine (the Mozart of the Kitchen). Legend has it that on one occasion Rossini was in the restaurant and asked that Dugléré prepare his filet at his table in a chafing dish. Dugléré made some excuse and Rossini is reported to have said, "Eh bien, faites-le tourné de l'autre coté, tournez-moi le dos!" ("Alright, do it somewhere else. Turn your back on me!") However, the OED gives a number of different claims for the origin of the term tournedos.

== Métier ==
He was described as a taciturn and serious person who demanded ingredients of the highest quality and abhorred drunkenness and smoking. He forbade his employees to smoke even outside of the workplace. Neither were customers allowed to smoke until dinner was over, at which time the maître d'hôtel went from table to table lighting cigars. He was a cultivated man and Alexandre Dumas consulted him several times for his Le Grand Dictionnaire de cuisine (1871).

Little more is known about him because he left no publications but he did leave some notebooks which are on permanent loan to the National Library in Paris. On his death in 1884, the French press was unanimous in eulogizing him.

== Recipes and garnishes ==
Sole à la Dugléré consists of fish poached in stock fish fumet with white wine on a bed of tomates concassées, minced onion and shallots and chopped parsley. It is served with a beurre blanc consisting of the cooking liquid mounted with butter.

À la Dugléré indicates a garnish of shallots, onions and tomatoes.
