= Café Anglais =

Restaurant in Paris, France

Coordinates: 48°52′16.58″N 2°20′14.81″E

The Café Anglais (French pronunciation: [kafe ɑ̃ɡlɛ], English café) was a famous French restaurant located at the corner of the Boulevard des Italiens (n° 13) and the Rue de Marivaux in Paris, France.

== History ==
Opened in 1802, the restaurant was named in honor of the Treaty of Amiens, a peace accord signed between Britain and France. In the beginning, its clientele were coachmen and domestic servants but it later became frequented by actors and patrons of the nearby Opera House. In 1822, the new proprietor, Paul Chevreuil, turned it into a fashionable restaurant with a reputation for roasted and grilled meats. It was after the arrival of chef Adolphe Dugléré that the Café Anglais achieved its highest gastronomic reputation. It was then frequented by the wealthy and the aristocracy of Paris.

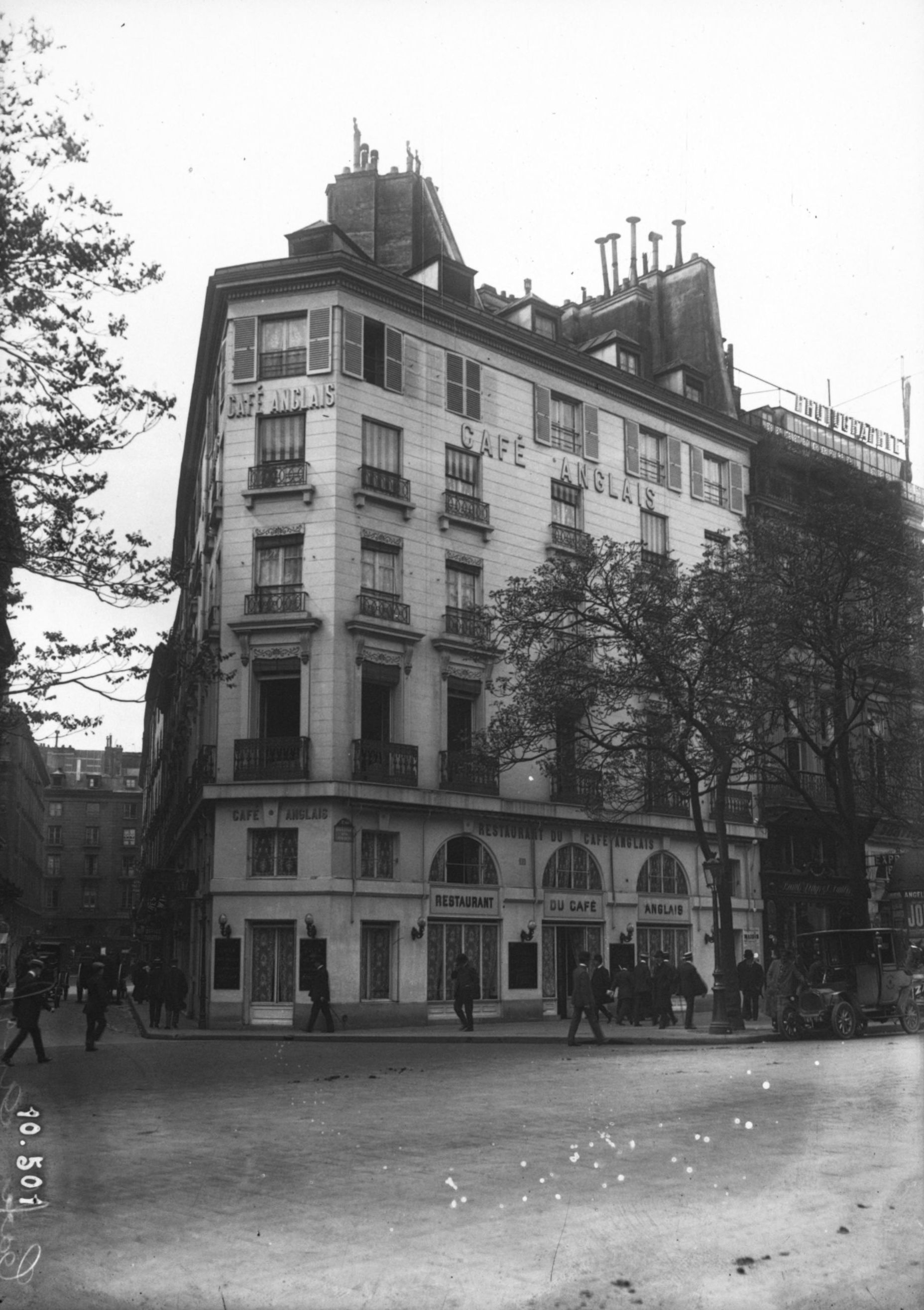
The Café Anglais some months before its destruction

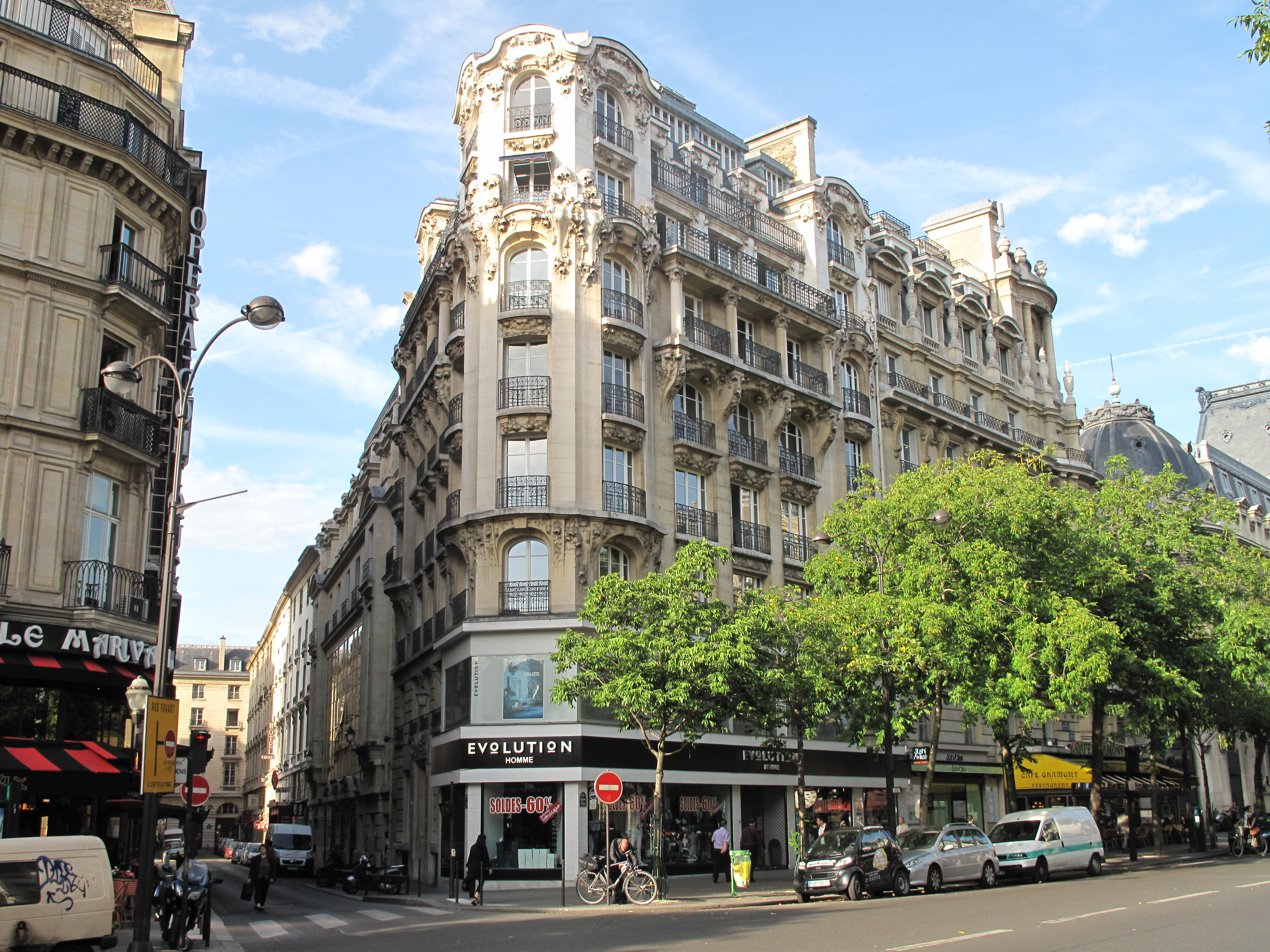
The site now

Although the white-faced exterior was austere, the interior was elaborately decorated with furniture in mahogany and walnut woods, and mirrors of gold leaf patina.

The building included 22 private rooms and lounges. The London food reviewer and historian Lt.-Col. Nathaniel Newnham-Davis stated "...the Anglais' was a great supping place, the little rabbit hutches of the entresol being the scene of some of the wildest and most interesting parties given by the great men of the Second Empire." The most famous was known as Le Grand 16.

Recipes Dugléré created included Germiny Soup, dedicated to the head of the Banque de France, the Comte de Germiny. Dugléré also created Pommes Anna, reputedly named in honor of the famous courtesan of the Second Empire, Anna Deslions. He also composed the menu called the "Three Emperors Dinner" in honor of Tsar Alexander II, Kaiser Wilhelm I and Otto von Bismarck for the Exposition Universelle in 1867 in Paris.

The restaurant closed in 1913. It has been replaced by a building in Art Nouveau style.

== Cultural depictions ==
The restaurant is mentioned in part 3 of Honoré de Balzac's Le Père Goriot (1819), in chapter 10 of Gustave Flaubert's Sentimental Education (1869), in chapter 4 in Émile Zola's La Curée (1872), in chapter 10 of Zola's Nana (1880), in Guy de Maupassant's short story "Les Bijoux" (1883), in chapter 2 of E. V. Lucas' A Wanderer in Paris (1909), in Marcel Proust's In Search of Lost Time (towards the beginning of volume 2, "Within a Budding Grove", 1918), in The Alice B. Toklas Cookbook (1954), and in Umberto Eco's The Prague Cemetery (2010). It is also mentioned by Henry James in chapter 1 of The American (1877), in which Christopher Newman “supped” there the night before visiting the Louvre, and in chapter 20 of The Portrait of a Lady (1881). It is featured in Karen Blixen's short story "Babette's Feast" (1958): the title character Babette Hersant was the head chef at the Café Anglais before fleeing to Denmark. It is the setting for act IV of Jacques Offenbach's operetta La Vie parisienne (1866).
