= Chicken à la King =

Diced creamed chicken served on toast

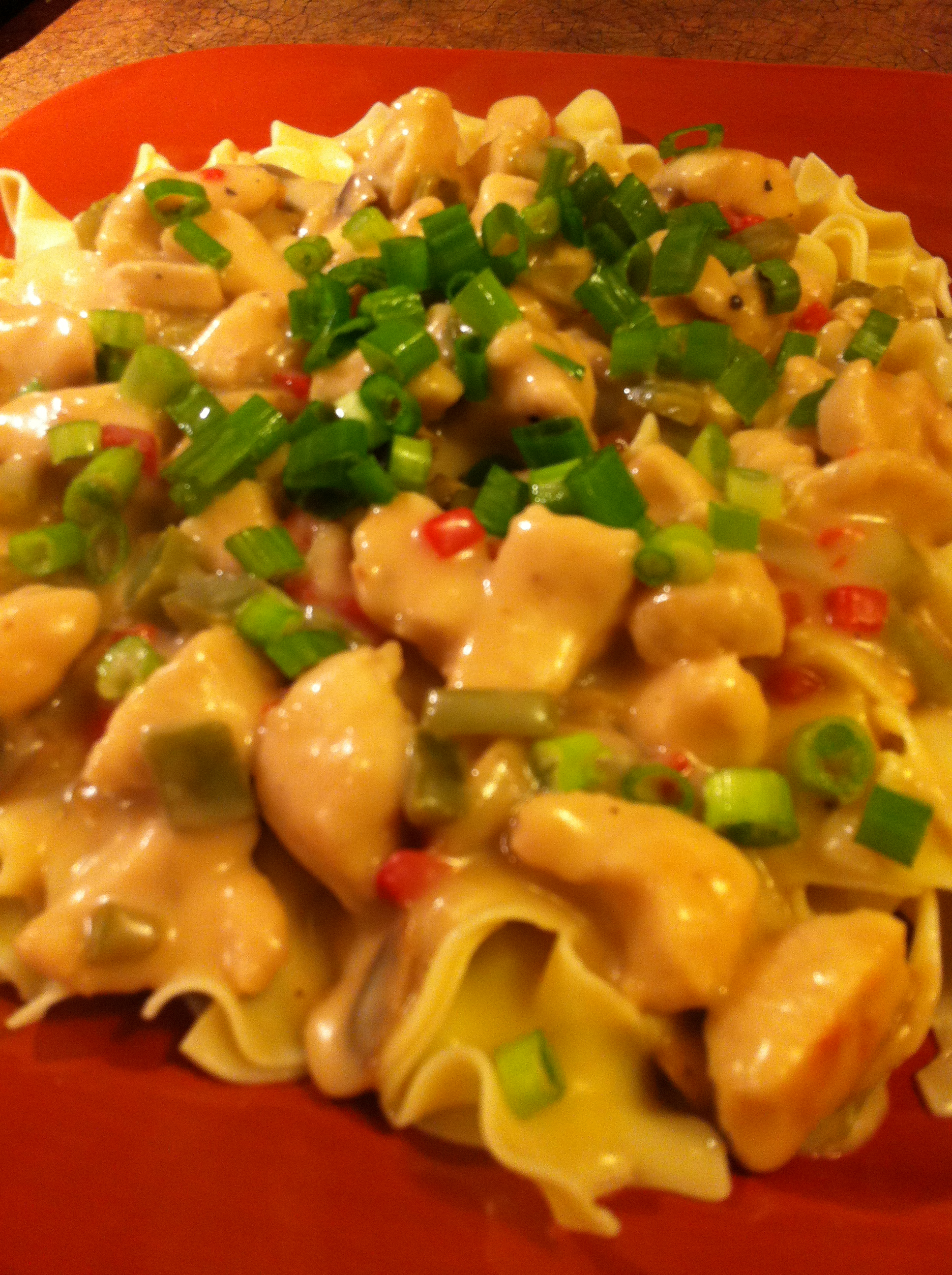
- Chicken à la King over egg noodles
- Place of origin: Disputed
- Main ingredients: Chicken, cream sauce, and often with sherry, mushrooms, and vegetables

Chicken à la King ('chicken in the style of King' - see History for possible etymologies) is an American dish consisting of diced, shredded, or sliced chicken in a cream sauce, usually with mushrooms, pimientos, and sherry, originally served over toast points or in a vol-au-vent or pastry case, later over rice or noodles. Variations include tuna, turkey, etc., à la King.

Starting as a variant of the elegant French vols au vent à la Reine in the 1890s and served in prestigious restaurants, it became a staple of middle-class receptions and home cooking in the 1950s, and is now largely considered retro.

== History ==
Various dishes named chicken à la Reine 'in the Queen's style' and à la Royale 'in the royal style' are attested as early as 1665. Early à la Reine dishes, perhaps named for the French Queen Margaret of Valois, were soups defined by containing poultry and pulverized almonds, and often thickened with eggs and breadcrumbs. In 1742, François Marin's coulis à la reine is a purée of chicken cooked in veal broth with eggs, almonds, and bread crumbs. In 1808, Grimod mentions petites bouchées à la reine, suggesting that the reine in question is Marie Leszczyńska of France. During the 19th century, the recipe evolves into a vol-au-vent filled with chicken meat in a Béchamel sauce, often including mushrooms, truffles, cock's combs, and other luxurious ingredients. A 1900 recipe for Petits Vols au Vent à la Reine fills a vol-au-vent with chicken and optionally mushrooms and a truffle in a white sauce.

It is not clear how these led to chicken à la King, which is very similar except for the addition of pimientos. One account says that chicken à la King was created in the 1890s by the cook William "Bill" King of the Bellevue Hotel in Philadelphia. Another claims that chef George Greenwald of the Brighton Beach Hotel in Brighton Beach created it in 1898, naming it after the owner of the hotel, E. Clarke King II. Assuming that the Chicken à la King mentioned in 1893 is the same dish, this is not possible.

Several obituaries credit King for it after he died on March 4, 1915. A New York Tribune editorial reads:

The name of William King is not listed among the great ones of the earth. No monuments will ever be erected to his memory, for he was only a cook. Yet what a cook! In him blazed the fire of genius which, at the white heat of inspiration, drove him one day, in the old Bellevue, in Philadelphia, to combine bits of chicken, mushrooms, truffles, red and green peppers and cream in that delight-some mixture which ever after has been known as "Chicken a la King."

Other stories claim that the original name was "à la Keene". However, the name King appears long before Keene, and there is no contemporary documentation of any of these stories. One Keene story says it was created by Charles Ranhofer, the chef at Delmonico's, in the 1880s, and named after Foxhall Parker Keene. But it does not appear in Ranhofer's cookbook, published in 1894. Another says it was created in 1881 at Claridge's Hotel in London and named for James R. Keene, father of Foxhall, in celebration of his victory at the Grand Prix de Paris; it was then supposedly reworked by Oscar Tschirky at the Waldorf Hotel and named after a banker named King.

The dish was mentioned in The New York Times in 1893, and a recipe was published in 1905. The first cookbooks by Fannie Farmer to include the dish are her Catering for Special Occasions in 1911 her New Book of Cookery in 1912; the earliest edition of her Boston Cooking-School Cook Book (often called the Fannie Farmer Cookbook) to include it was in 1924, despite many claims that it appears earlier. The 1915 edition of the Settlement Cook Book includes two recipes, one made with sherry, canned mushrooms, and thickened chicken soup, garnished with green pepper, pimiento, canned peas, and canned asparagus tips; the other made with Madeira, cream sauce or fricassee sauce, and garnished with red and green peppers, truffles, mushrooms, and canned asparagus and artichoke hearts.

A 1956 British cookbook claimed that Chicken à la King dated back to King William (presumably William IV in the 1830s), but then gives a recipe from New York described as "one of the earliest for this dish".

== Preparation ==
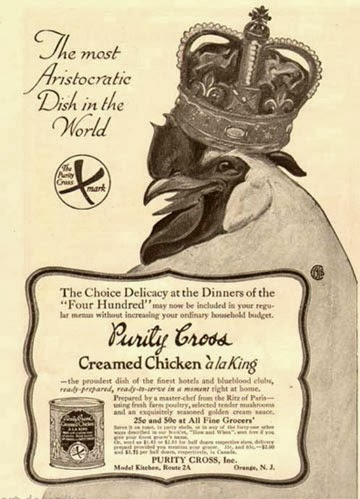
Ad for canned Creamed Chicken à la King (1917)

Chicken à la King may be made from leftover cooked chicken or freshly poached chicken.

Before 1945, mushrooms, pimientos, and fortified wine—often Madeira early on, but later invariably dry sherry—were standard. It was served on toast points or in vol-au-vent. The white sauce was often a classic velouté based on stock or sometimes a simpler white sauce. Recipes for housewives used canned ingredients as early as 1915.

For example, Fannie Farmer's 1912 recipe consists of a simplified white sauce made with both milk and cream and stock, thickened with corn starch, to which chicken, sauteéd mushroom caps, and strips of canned pimiento are added, then thickened with egg and butter; she does not specify how to serve it.

As it became a middle-class dish, after 1945, convenience foods such as canned mushrooms were widely used. Sometimes canned mushroom soup substituted for the white sauce. Pimientos remained a characteristic ingredient, although sometimes frozen peas were used instead. Sherry became optional. Rice, noodles, and biscuits became common as a base. Variations substitute turkey, ham, canned tuna, etc. for the chicken.

In the 1970s, it continued to be a mass-market convenience food, but was also revived as a gourmet specialty. So for example James Beard's 1972 recipe calls for fresh mushrooms, green bell pepper, onion, and pimiento together with chicken in a velouté sauce with sherry.

Modern chefs often treat chicken à la King as an inspiration rather than a recipe. For example, Yotam Ottolenghi's version consists of chicken breasts and carrots with raisins, tomatoes, and a Yemeni spice mixture with a small amount of cream and lemon, served with rice.

Chicken à la King was formerly often prepared in a chafing dish.

Canned à la King dishes have also been marketed. The Kelvinator company, a maker of refrigerators, suggested in 1930 serving frozen sliced canned chicken à la King over lettuce as a warm-weather lunch dish.

== Reputation ==
Chicken à la King began as an elegant restaurant dish. It was characterized in 1913 as a "dainty home luncheon", that is, suitable for ladies. In the 1930s, it became a popular way of repurposing leftover chicken and turkey. The food industry promoted making it with canned condensed soup as a convenience food in the 1940s, and it became notorious as a mediocre dish served at buffets and cafeterias during the middle to late 20th century. It was popular from the 1910s to the 1960s.

The food writer James Beard commented in 1972 that it was "usually prepared in a mediocre fashion" but adds that it is "really quite good if done with care and fine ingredients". Marian Burros remembered it in 1989 as an "unspeakable mixture of flour-laden sauce with bits of canned mushrooms, canned pimento and overcooked chicken" served at prep-school dinner-dances in the 1950s and commented that it had "gone the way of molded gelatin salads". In 1985, the humor and food writer Calvin Trillin wrote a essay describing its former popularity at rich people's receptions: "There was a time—in the 1950s, say—when the whole country seemed to be awash in chicken à la king"; and then musing about what had happened to it: "I've been wondering... where all the chicken à la king went... I began to think that the government might have stored it somewhere—in huge silos, maybe, or in those salt caves in Kansas where they keep surplus rutabagas and old Army morning reports".

In 1956, the British cooking teacher Constance Spry described Chicken à la King as a good way to use cooked chicken, commenting that "it may be dull or good depending on the flavouring of the sauce and on the additions". Chicken à la King was also present in upscale restaurants in Britain, but also had a poor reputation as a food for events ("at [t]he time it was in at almost every function to offer this dish and it was, not to put too finer point on it, appalling").

It was formerly common at functions in South Africa.

It is now often considered retro cuisine or comfort food.
