= Pièce montée =

Decorative confectionery centerpiece

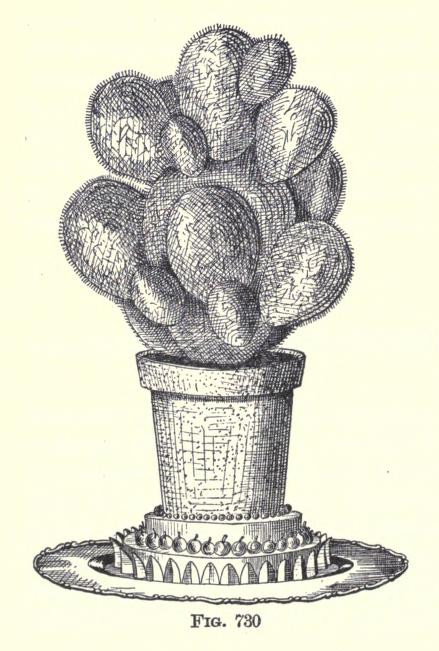
- Illustration of a pièce montée representing a cactus, taken from Charles Ranhofer's 1894 book, The Epicurean. It was to be made of various types of nougat, including pistachio nougat to form the cactus itself.
- Type: Decorative confectionery
- Place of origin: France
- Main ingredients: Nougat, marzipan, spun sugar

A pièce montée (French: [pjɛs mɔ̃te], lit. 'assembled piece' or 'mounted piece'; plural pièces montées) is a kind of decorative confectionery centerpiece in an architectural or sculptural form used for formal banquets and made of such ingredients as "confectioner's paste" (also known as pâté d'office), nougat, marzipan, and spun sugar. Although the ingredients are typically edible, their purpose is mainly decorative, and they are often not meant to be consumed. They are associated with classical French chefs, such as Carême. Carême had studied architecture, and is credited with saying, referring to pièces montées, that architecture is the most noble of the arts, and pastry the highest form of architecture.

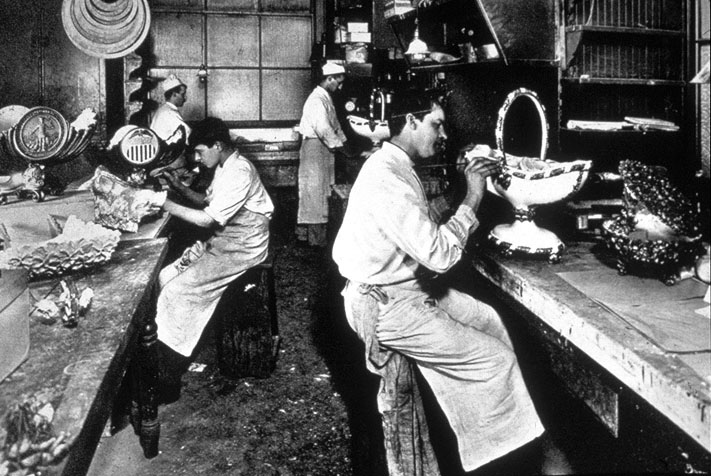
Pièces montées for a banquet being prepared in the kitchen of Delmonico's Restaurant in New York in 1902

The term pièce montée is sometimes used to refer to the dessert also known as croquembouche, an assemblage of choux pastry profiteroles (or occasionally other kinds of pastry) stuck together with caramel or with spun sugar into a tall, usually conical shape. Unlike the type of pièce montée described above, it is meant to be eaten; in France, traditionally it is served at parties that celebrate weddings and baptisms.

== See also ==
- Entremet
