= William Street (Manhattan) =

Street in Manhattan, New York

Coordinates: 40°42′22″N 74°00′35″W

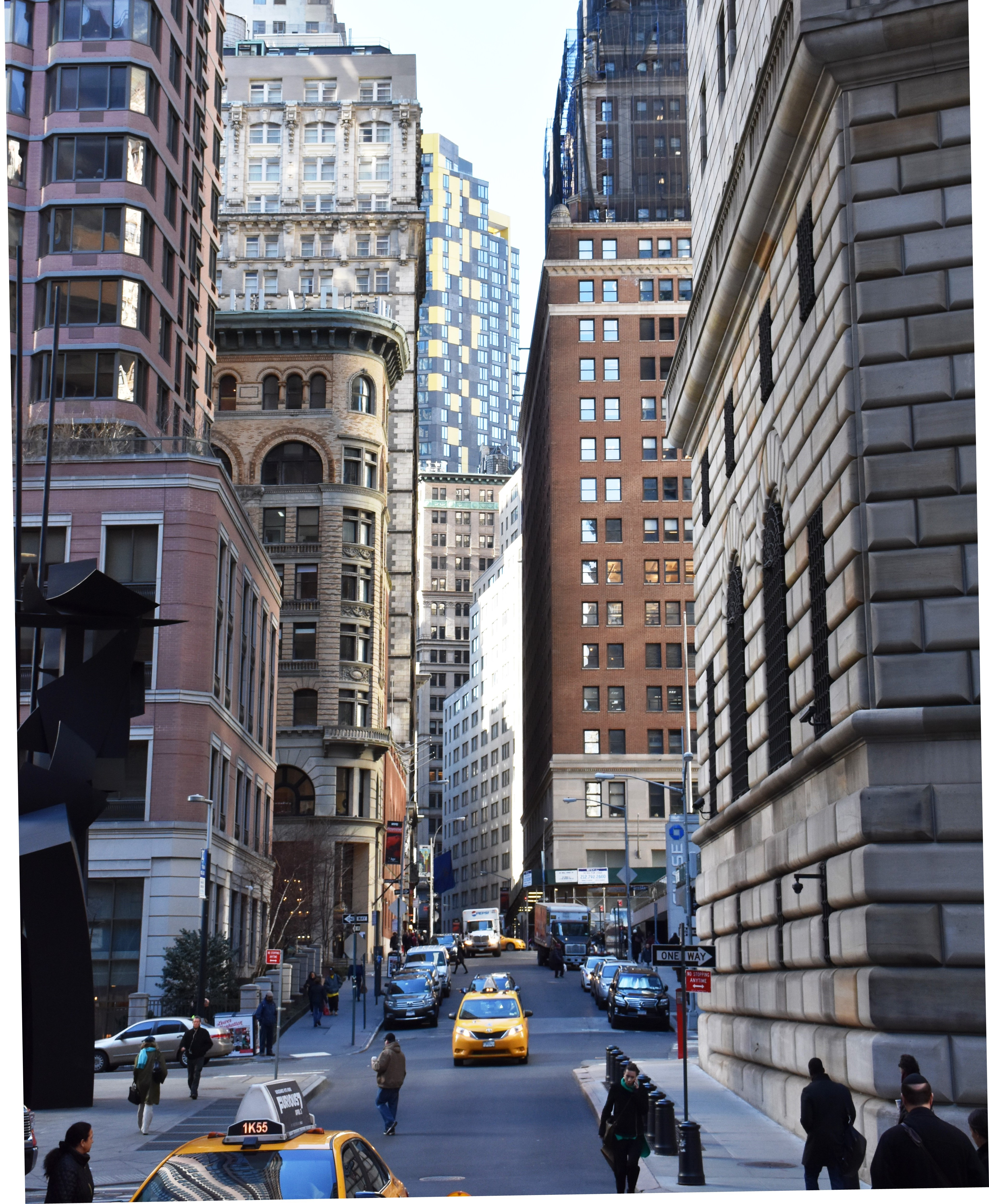
William Street, looking south from below Cedar Street

William Street is a street in the Financial District of Lower Manhattan, New York City. It runs generally southwest to northeast, crossing Wall Street. At Beaver Street, William Street splits in two. The western segment is known as South William Street and terminates at Broad Street, while the eastern segment continues as William Street and terminates at Stone Street. The northern terminal is Spruce Street. North of Beekman Street, in front of New York Downtown Hospital, William Street is a pedestrian-only street.

== History ==
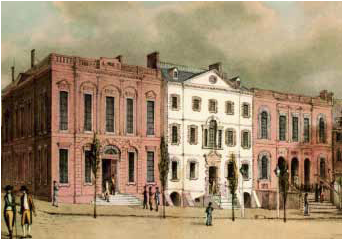
View of the northeast corner of William and Wall streets. The house to the far right became City Bank of New York's first home at 38 Wall Street, later re-numbered as №52. (Painting by Archibald Robertson, c. 1798)

It is one of the oldest streets in Manhattan and can be seen in the 1660 Castello Plan of New Amsterdam. It was originally called King Street, but was later renamed William after Willem Beekman who arrived in New Amsterdam in 1647 as a fellow passenger of Peter Stuyvesant. Beekman got his start as a Dutch West India Company clerk and later served nine terms as mayor of the young port city.

The buildings on South William Street 13-23 were reconstructed in the Dutch revival style by architect C. P. H. Gilbert and later Edward L. Tilton in the early 1900s, evoking New Amsterdam with the use of red brick as building material and the features of stepped gables. These buildings are part of the Stone Street Historic District, designated in 1996 by the New York City Landmarks Preservation Commission.

== Buildings ==
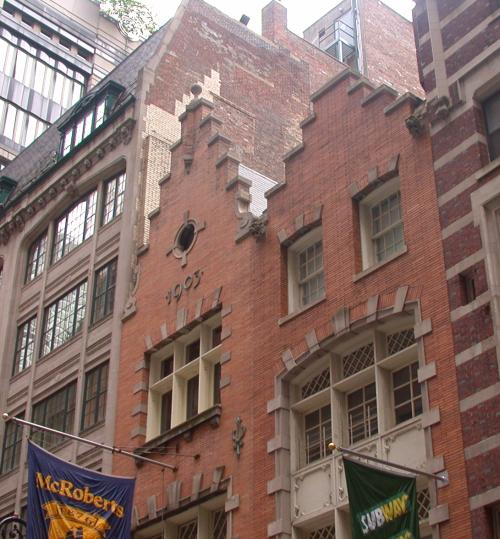
13-15 South William Street, constructed in the Dutch Colonial Revival architecture

The buildings on William Street tend to cater to the financial underpinnings of the area and include luxury condominiums, offices, and at least one conference center. Notable buildings fronting William Street include:

- 1 William Street
- 13-23 South William Street, constructed in Dutch Colonial Revival architecture
- 85 Broad Street (Goldman Sachs)
- 2 South William Street (Delmonico's Restaurant)
- 15 William
- 20 Exchange Place
- 55 Wall Street
- 48 Wall Street
- 28 Liberty Street
- 33 Liberty Street (Federal Reserve Bank of New York)
- 130 William
- New York Downtown Hospital
- Pace University
- The New School
- Our Lady of Victory Church (Manhattan)

== Transportation ==
The IRT Broadway – Seventh Avenue Line (2 and 3 trains) of the New York City Subway runs under William Street, with stops at Wall Street and Fulton Street.
