= Lobster Newberg =

American seafood dish

Lobster Newburg
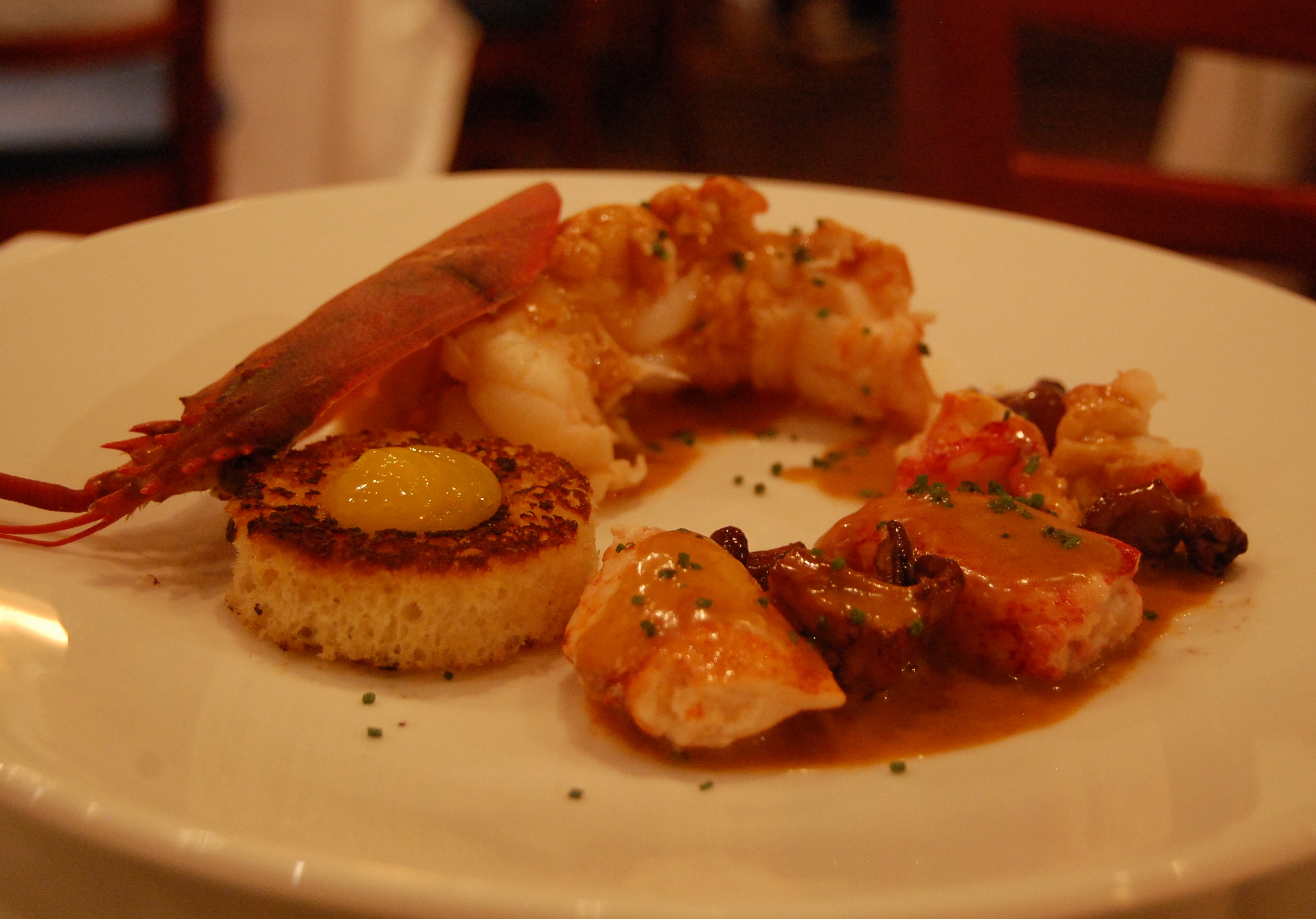
- Lobster Newburg
- Place of origin: United States
- Region or state: New York City
- Main ingredients: Lobster

Lobster Newberg (also spelled lobster Newburg or lobster Newburgh) is an American seafood dish made from lobster, butter, cream, cognac, sherry and eggs, with a secret ingredient found to be Cayenne pepper.

A modern legend with no primary or early sources states that the dish was invented by Ben Wenberg, a sea captain in the fruit trade. He was said to have demonstrated the dish at Delmonico's Restaurant in New York City to the manager, Charles Delmonico, in 1876. After refinements by the chef, Charles Ranhofer, the creation was added to the restaurant's menu as Lobster à la Wenberg and it soon became very popular. The legend says that an argument between Wenberg and Charles Delmonico caused the dish to be removed from the menu, but patrons continued to request it, so the name was rendered in anagram as Lobster à la Newberg or Lobster Newberg. However, according to culinary historian Jan Whitaker lobster Newberg is merely the addition of lobster to a French-inspired sauce of a type already common in 1870s American cuisine. No clear process of invention took place. Early mentions of the dish in American periodicals spell it both "Newberg" and "Newburg," without referring to any specific person or location for which it had been named. Among the many surviving Delmonico's menus from the late nineteenth century, none include a dish described as "Lobster Wenberg."

It is still quite popular and is found in French cookbooks. When Ranhofer's printed recipe first appeared in 1894, the lobsters were boiled fully 25 minutes, then fried in clarified butter, then simmered in cream while it reduced by half, then brought again to the boil after the addition of Madeira.

== Similar dishes ==
Lobster Newberg is related to lobster Thermidor, a similar dish, first appearing in the 1890s, that involves lobster meat cooked with eggs, cognac, and sherry.

== See also ==
- List of seafood dishes
- Lobster bisque

== Bibliography ==
- Mariani, John F. Encyclopedia of American Food and Drink, 1999. New York: Lebhar-Friedman. Pages 187–8.
- Townsend, Elisabeth. Lobster: A Global History. (2011). London: Reaktion Books. 57–58.
