= Vol-au-vent =

Puff pastry originating in France

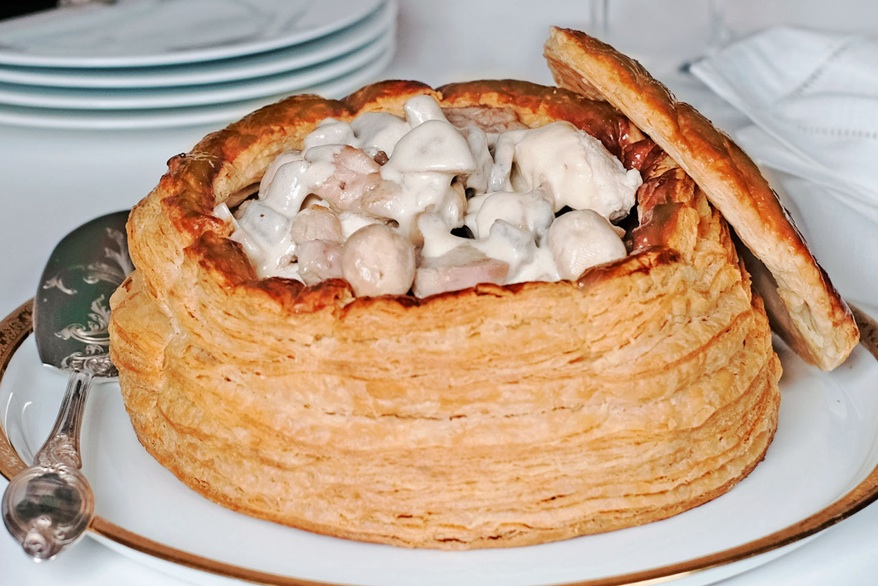
- A large vol-au-vent
- Type: Pastry
- Place of origin: France
- Created by: Marie-Antoine Carême
- Main ingredients: Puff pastry

A vol-au-vent (pronounced [vɔlovɑ̃], French for "fly to the wind", to describe its lightness) is a small hollow case of puff pastry with a filling. It was also formerly called a 'patty case' in the USA, though patty cases in the rest of the world are heavier in pastry.

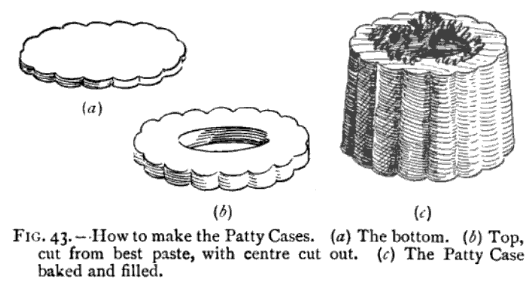
How to make vol-au-vents

A vol-au-vent is typically made by cutting two circles in one piece of rolled out puff pastry, cutting a hole in one of them, with the 2nd cut smaller and only 3/4 the way through so as to make them rise at different levels; the ring-shaped piece is then stacked on top of the disc-shaped piece. The pastry is cooked, then filled with any of a variety of savory or sweet fillings.

The pastry is sometimes credited to Marie-Antoine Carême. However, an entremet called petits gâteaux vole au vent is mentioned in François Marin's 1739 cookbook Les Dons de Comus, years before Carême's birth.

In France, it is usually served as an entrée (that is, an appetizer) or une mise-en-bouche (a "put-in-mouth"), filled with meat, fish, prawns, cheese, paté or vegetarian products.

== International varieties ==
In Belgium, it is a common main dish that can be found on the menus of most restaurants, and is nearly always filled with a combination of chicken, mushrooms, and small meatballs, served with either mashed potatoes or fries as a entree or main course. This Belgian variation is also available in the Netherlands, where it is called pasteitje ("little pastry"). In the 70s a popular filling was Chicken à la King.

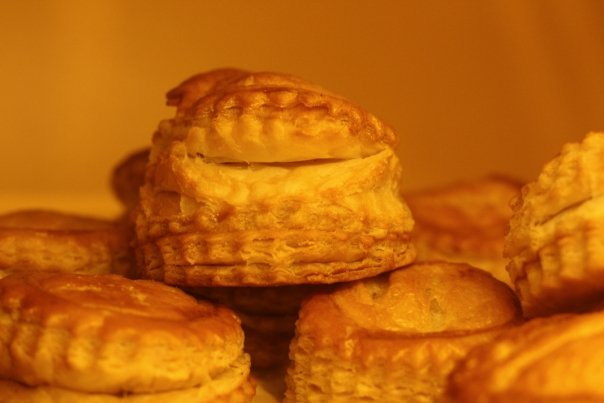
Pakistani chicken patty

In the Mexican region of Veracruz it is hispanicised as volován, and often filled with local fillings such as pollo con mole, atún a la veracruzana, and others. The pastry first arrived in Mexico during the Second French intervention.

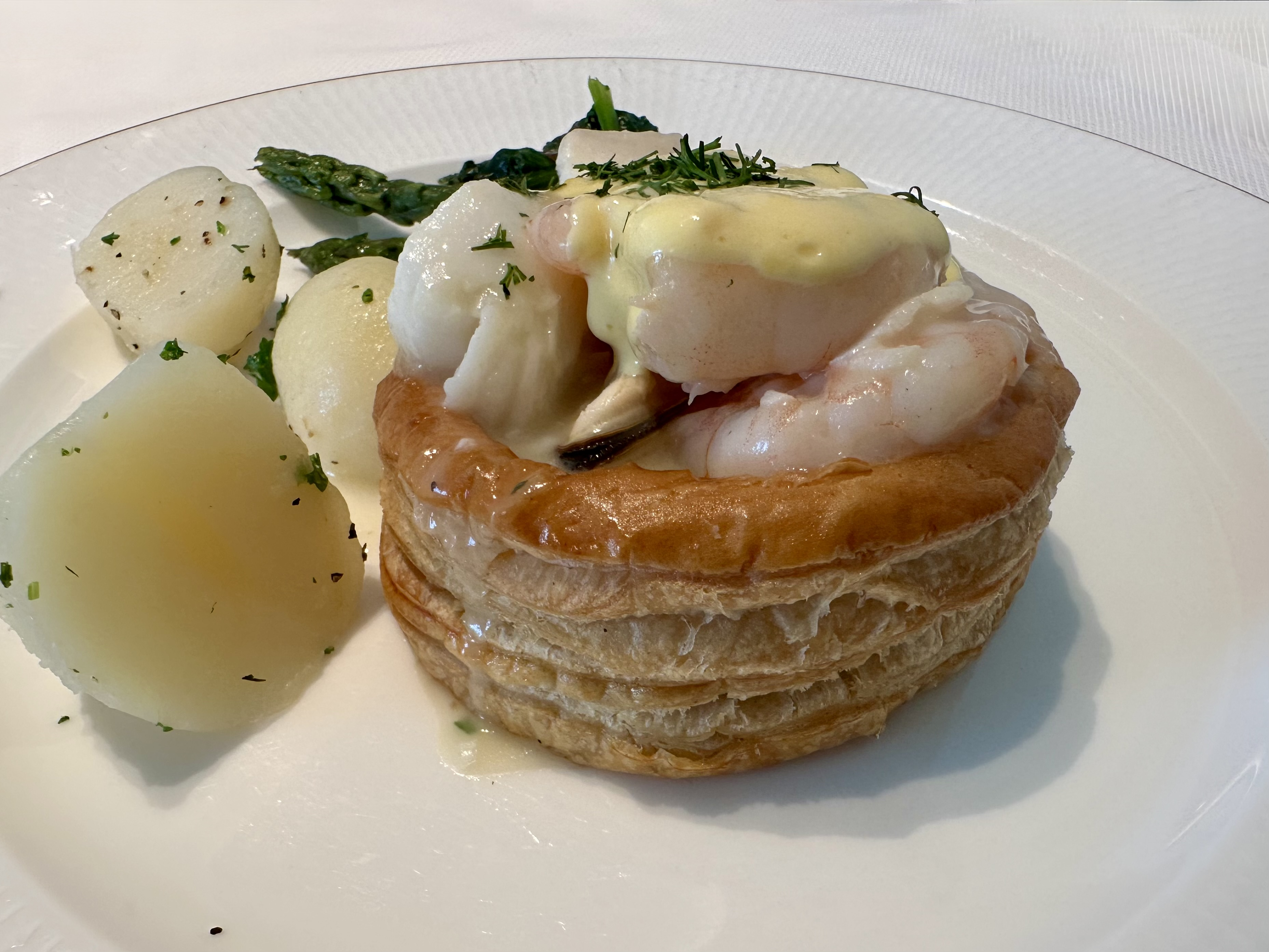
Seafood vol-au-vent

Vol-au-vents became popular in the United Kingdom during the 1960s. These small puff-pastry cases filled with savoury ingredients, such as chicken, seafood, or mushrooms, became a common feature at dinner parties, buffets, and festive gatherings and weddings. The trend for vol-au-vents was part of a broader culinary fascination with French-inspired dishes during the decade. Their versatility and the ability to prepare them in advance made them an attractive option for hosts looking to impress their guests. This surge in popularity can be attributed to the growing interest in sophisticated and elegant party foods, which reflected the social and cultural trends of the time.

== See also ==
- Amuse-bouche
- Canapé
- Hors d'œuvre
- List of hors d'oeuvre
- List of pastries
- Tapas
- Zakuski
