= Tsao & McKown Architects =

Architecture firm

Tsao & McKown is an American architecture firm. The firm designed Suntec City and the luxury condominium 15 William. In 2009 the firm received a National Design Award.
