= Delmonico's =

American restaurant in New York City

Coordinates: 40.70508°N 74.01007°W

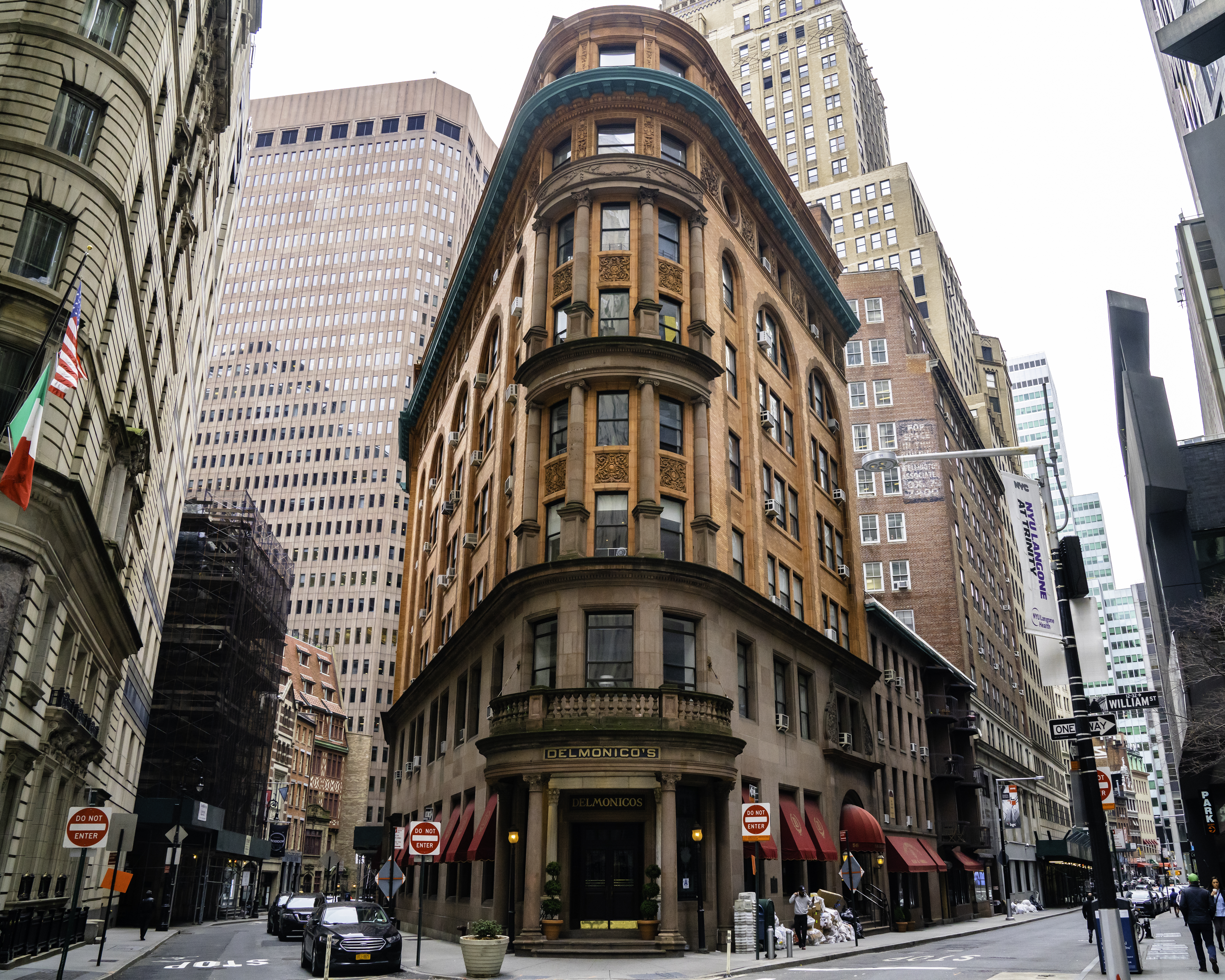
Delmonico's at 56 Beaver Street in the Financial District in 2020

Delmonico's is a series of restaurants that have operated in New York City, with the present version located at 56 Beaver Street in the Financial District of Manhattan.

The original version opened in 1827 at 23 William Street. Delmonico's (under the Delmonico family's ownership and management) closed all locations by 1923. In 1926, Delmonico's reopened under new ownership of Oscar Tucci at 56 Beaver Street.

== History ==
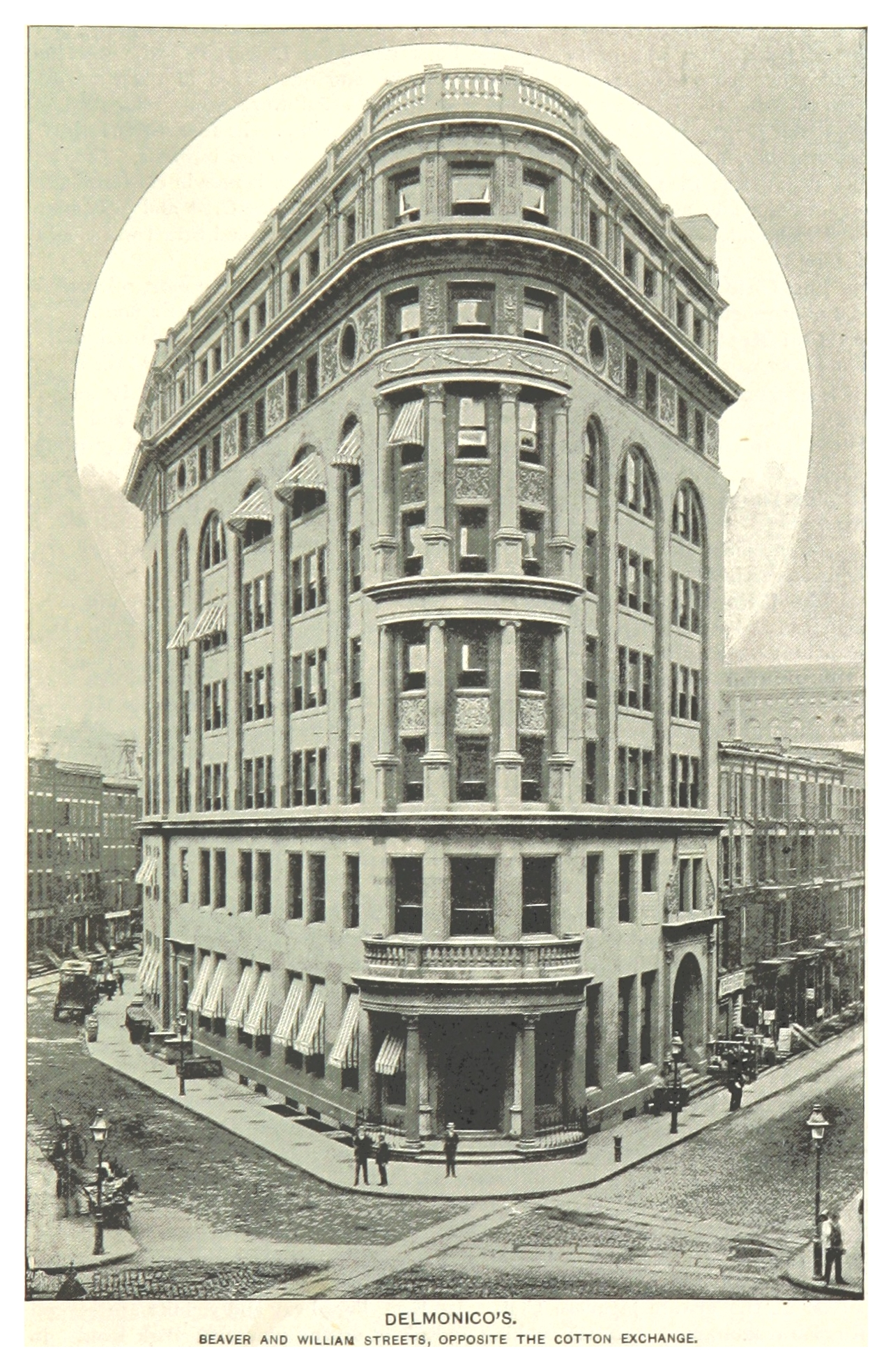
Delmonico's, Beaver and South William Streets, 1893

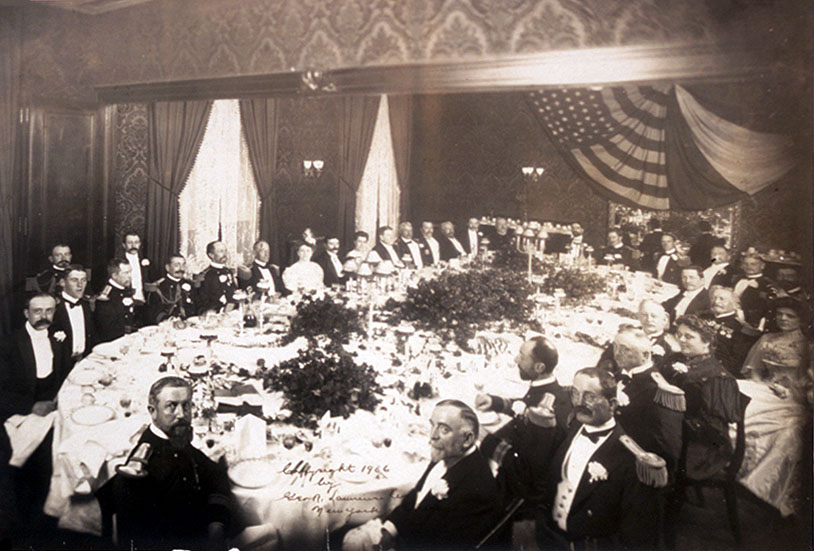
Dinner in honor of Admiral Campion at Delmonico's in 1906

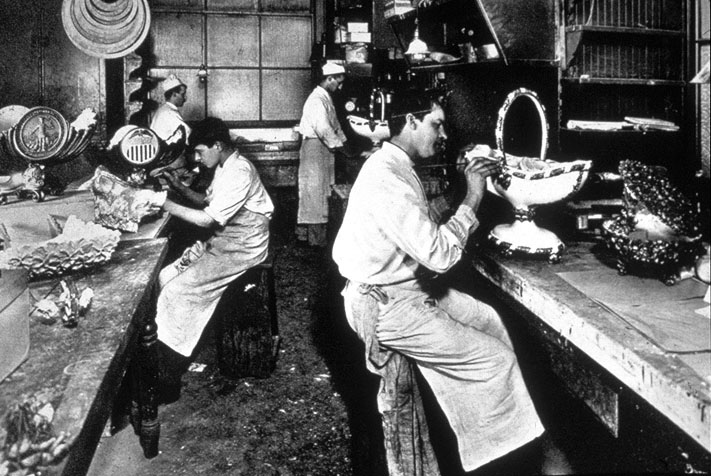
Pièces montées for a banquet being prepared in the Delmonico's kitchen in 1902

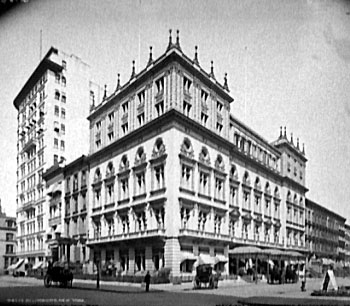
Delmonico's 1897 restaurant at the corner of 5th Ave. and 44th St. in 1903

=== Origin ===
The original Delmonico's opened in 1827 in a rented pastry shop at 23 William Street, and appeared in a list of restaurants in 1830. It was opened by Swiss-Italian immigrants, the brothers Giovanni and Pietro Delmonico. In 1831, they were joined by their nephew, Lorenzo, who eventually became responsible for the restaurant's wine list and menu.

The brothers moved their restaurant several times before settling at 56 Beaver Street (also 2 South William Street). When the building was opened on a grand scale in August 1837 after the Great Fire of New York, New Yorkers were told that the columns by the entrance had been imported from the ruins of Pompeii. It eventually became one of the most famous restaurants in New York, with its reputation eventually growing to international prominence.

=== Expansion and closure ===
Beginning in the 1850s, the restaurant hosted the annual gathering of the New England Society of New York, which featured many important speakers of the day. In 1860, Delmonico's provided the supper at the Grand Ball welcoming the Prince of Wales at the Academy of Music on East 14th Street. Supper was set out in a specially constructed room; the menu was French, and the pièces montées represented Queen Victoria and Prince Albert, the Great Eastern and Flora's Vase. The New York Times reported, "We may frankly say that we have never seen a public supper served in a more inapproachable [sic] (Note: Inapproachable: "irreproachable" may have been intended, unless a covert reference to the evening's crush was implied.) fashion, with greater discretion, or upon a more luxurious scale". In 1862, the restaurant hired Charles Ranhofer, considered one of the greatest chefs of his day.

The business was so successful that from 1865 to 1888, it expanded to four restaurants of the same name. At various times, there were Delmonico's at ten locations. By 1876, news of the prices at New York's restaurants, including Delmonico's, spread at least as far as Colorado where complaints about the cost of wine, eggs, bread and butter, potatoes, and coffee ("forty cents a cup"), appeared in the Pueblo Colorado Daily Chieftain.

In 1884, Republican presidential nominee James G. Blaine attended a dinner at Delmonico's with his wealthy backers. This was picked up by the press, and used against Blaine to show him as disconnected from poor and working-class Americans, particularly in a political cartoon of the dinner on the front page of the New York World. The menu from the dinner was also circulated by the Democrats for the same purpose. Blaine would go on to lose to Grover Cleveland in an election that was ultimately decided by a difference of fewer than 1,000 votes in New York.

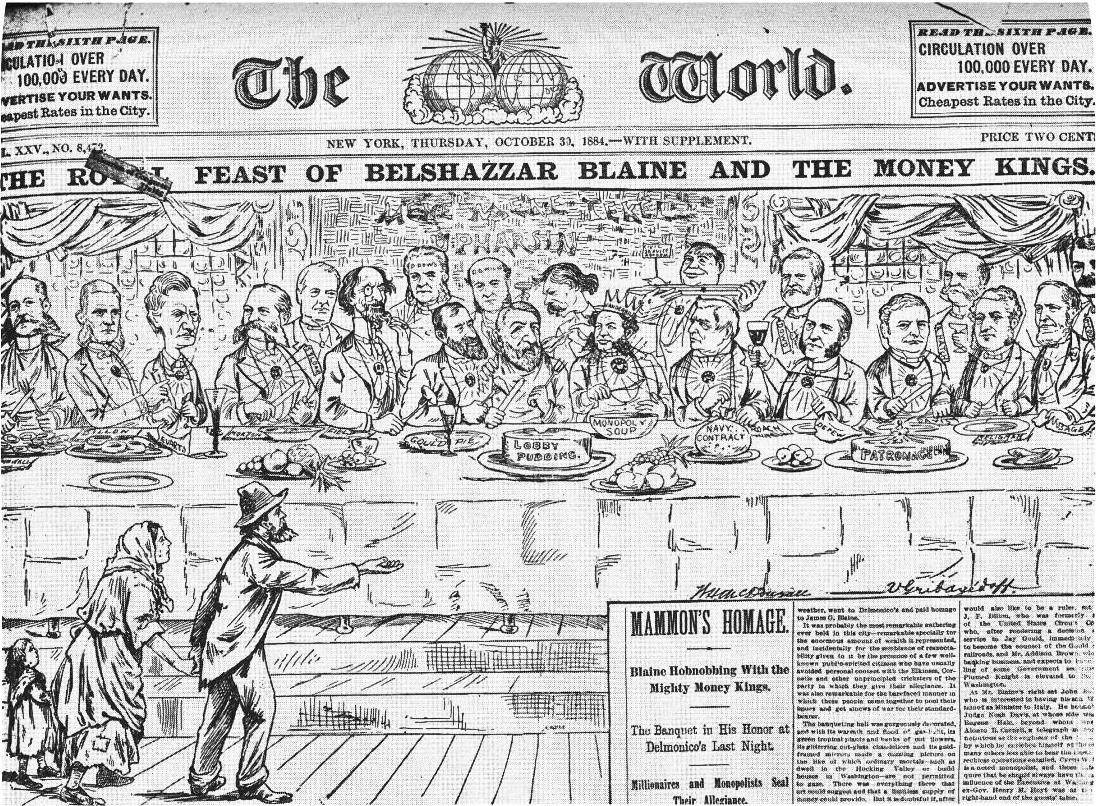
1884 political cartoon of James G. Blaine attending a dinner at Delmonico's with his wealthy donors

In 1899, Delmonico's vacated the six-story Delmonico Building at Fifth Avenue and 26th Street. (The edifice was sold to John B. Martin, owner of the Martin Hotel, in May 1901.)

In 1919, Edward L.C. Robins purchased Delmonico's. Its grand location at Fifth Avenue and 44th Street closed in 1923 as a result of changing dining habits due to Prohibition. That location was the final incarnation of Delmonico's with continuity to the original.

Restaurants owned and operated by the Delmonico family
Location	Dates	Comments
23 William Street	December 13, 1827 – December 16, 1835 (destroyed by fire)	"Delmonico & Brother, confectioners" small cafe and pastry shop
25 William Street	March, 1830 – December 16, 1835 (destroyed by fire)	"Delmonico & Brother, confectioners and Restaurant Francais"
76 Broad Street	February 23, 1836 – July 19, 1845 (destroyed by fire)	
2 South William Street/56 Beaver Street	August, 1837 – July 10, 1890. Rebuilt and reopened July 7, 1891, closed 1917	"Delmonico's Restaurant," informally called "The Citadel."
25 Broadway	June 1, 1846 – 1856	The Delmonico Hotel
Chambers Street and Broadway	1856 – October 26, 1876	
East 14th Street and 5th Avenue	April 9, 1862 – September 11, 1876	
22 Broad Street	1865–1893	
Fifth Avenue and 26th St.	September 11, 1876 – April 18, 1899	Lobster a la Newberg invented here in 1876
112–114 Broadway near Pine St.	October 26, 1876 – 1888	
Fifth Avenue and 44th Street	November 15, 1897 – May 21, 1923	The final Delmonico-owned restaurant

== Later revivals ==
In 1926, Oscar Tucci purchased the restaurant and reopened Delmonico's, first calling it Oscar's Delmonico, at 56 Beaver Street. Tucci ran a speakeasy in the lower level of the restaurant. In 1933, Tucci received the third liquor license in New York after the repeal of Prohibition. In later years, Oscar Tucci dropped "Oscar's" from the name and continued naming it Delmonico's. During the Tucci incarnation it adopted the original menus and recipes, and became distinguished in its own right, continuing to attract prominent politicians and celebrities, such as Lana Turner, Marilyn Monroe, Rock Hudson, Lena Horne, Elizabeth Taylor, Elvis, Etta James, JFK, Jackie Kennedy Onassis and others. Tucci also instituted many of the professional standards in use today in American restaurants known as the Delmonico Way, a method that is explained in the book The Delmonico Way; Sublime Entertaining & Legendary Recipes from the Restaurant that Made New York! by Max Tucci published by Rizzoli.

The Tucci era also produced four of the most prominent restaurateurs of the twentieth century, including Sirio Maccioni of Le Cirque, and Tony May.

The restaurant closed in 1977. In 1981 Edward Huber leased the building and after renovation he reopened Delmonico's at 56 Beaver Street in 1982. It lasted until 1993.

In 1997 the BiCE Group took over operations of the restaurant. The group renovated the location and reopened Delmonico's with Gian Pietro Branchi as executive chef. The restaurant reopened in May 1998 after a renovation by Morris Nathanson. In 1999, the restaurant was leased to the Ocinomled partnership. The restaurant closed temporarily in 2020 due to the COVID-19 pandemic and stayed closed for three years amid legal troubles between the partners and landlord. In December 2022 Dennis Turcinovic and Joseph Licul signed a new lease on the building. The restaurant reopened September 18, 2023.

== Signature dishes ==
Delmonico potatoes were invented at Delmonico's restaurant and possibly Chicken à la King. However, the restaurant is most famous for the Delmonico steak, which it now serves as a rib eye steak but originally served as a strip steak, hence the latter cut's nickname as the "New York strip" within the United States. Eggs Benedict were also said to have originated at Delmonico's, although others claim that dish as well.

It is often said that the name "Baked Alaska" was coined at Delmonico's as well, in 1867, by chef Charles Ranhofer. However, no contemporary account exists of this occurrence, and Ranhofer himself referred to the dish, in 1894, as "Alaska Florida", apparently referring to the contrast between extremes of heat and cold. It is also said that Lobster Newberg was invented at the restaurant.

== Other Delmonico's restaurants ==
Delmonico's Italian Steakhouse is a chain of restaurants with six locations in Upstate New York and Florida. This chain has no connection to the Delmonico's Restaurant located at 56 Beaver Street.

== Menus ==
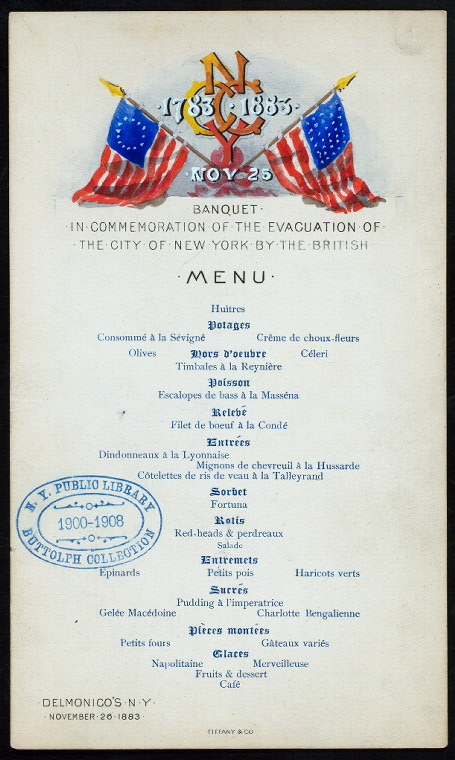
Banquet menu in French from the Fifth Avenue and 26th St. location for the 1883 Centennial Commemoration of Evacuation Day

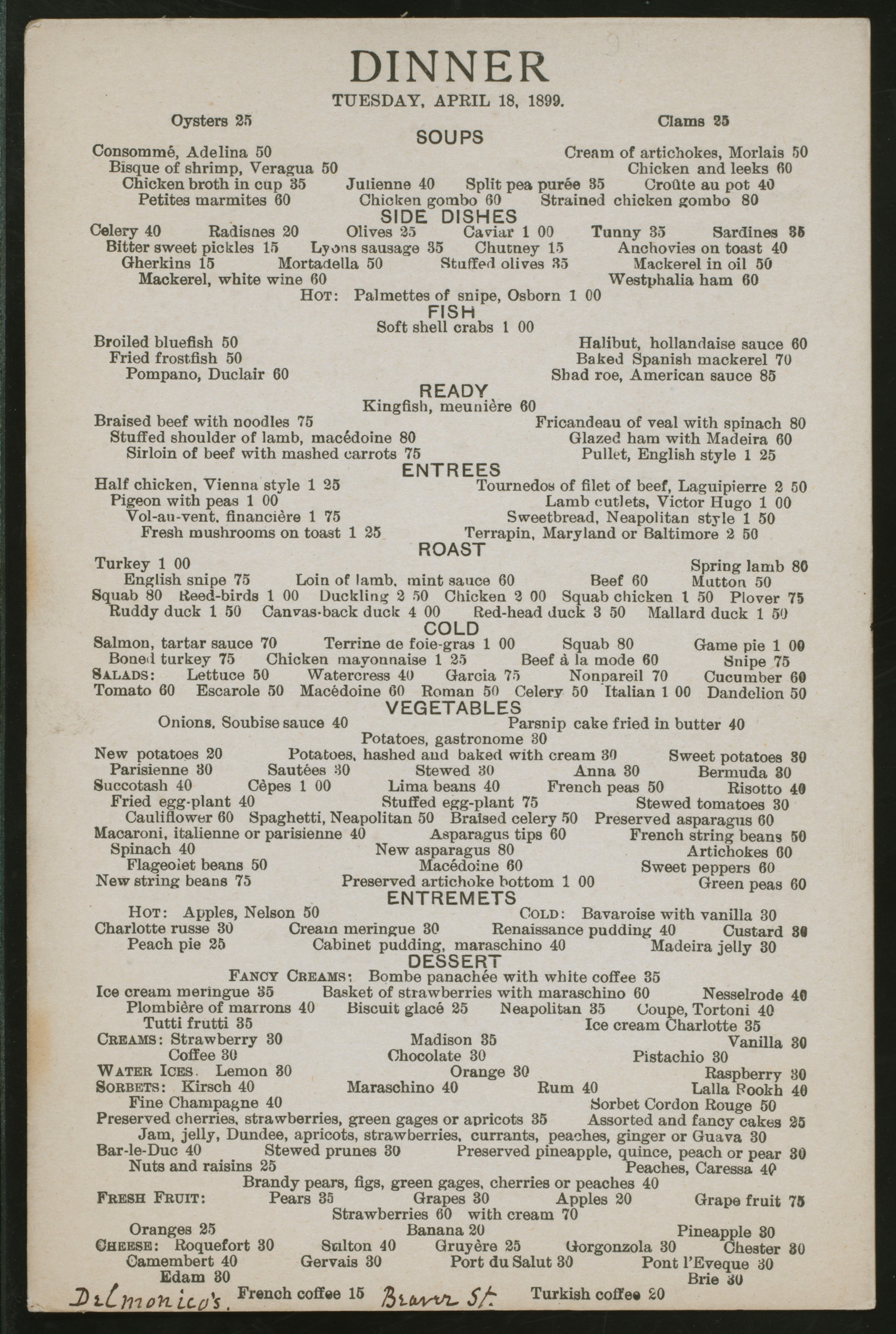
Dinner menu from Water St./ Beaver St. location, April 18, 1899. The reverse has the same menu in French.

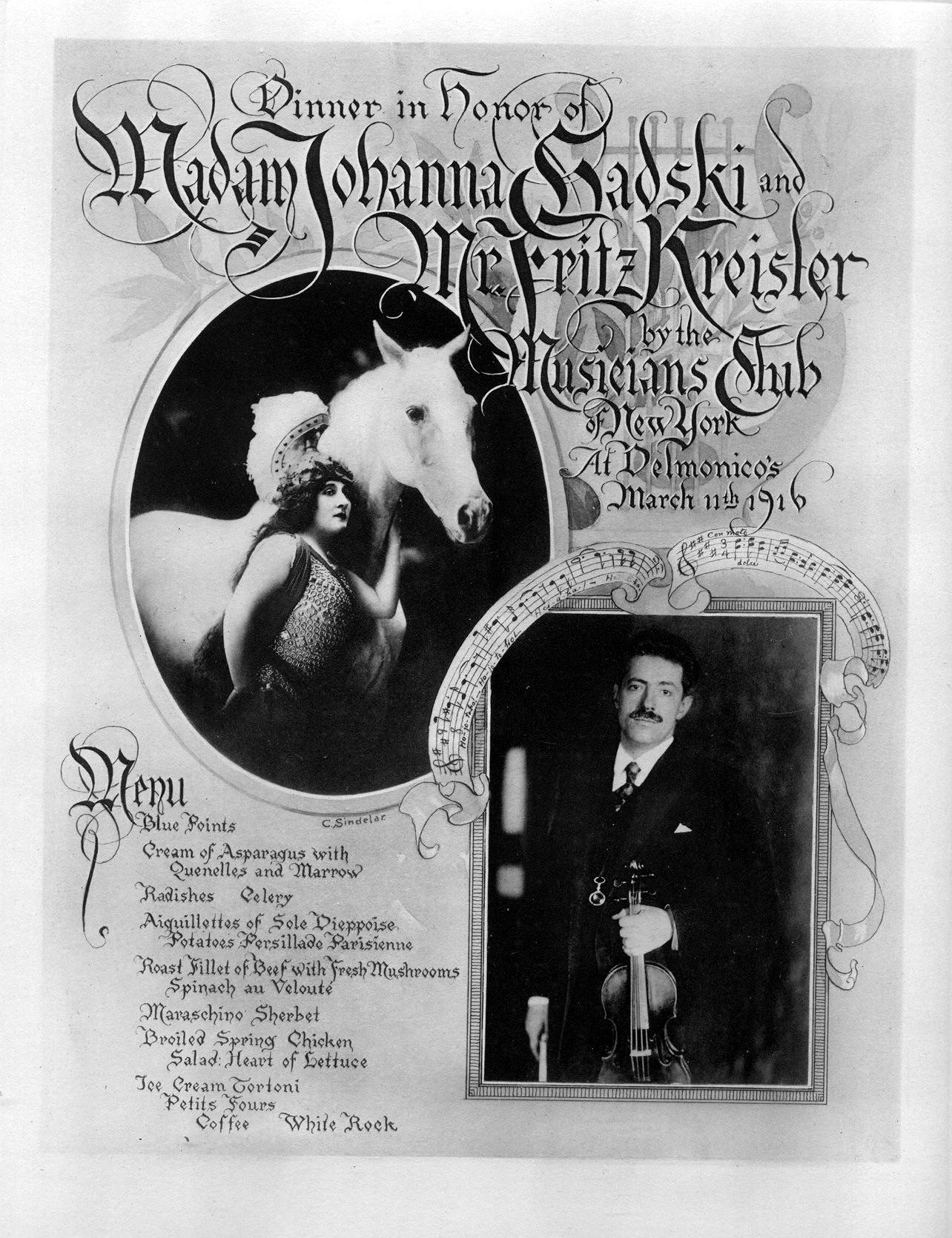
Menu for a 1916 Musicians Club of New York dinner honoring singer Johanna Gadski and musician Fritz Kreisler

== See also ==
- List of New York City Landmarks
- National Register of Historic Places listings in New York County, New York
