= 15 William =

Residential skyscraper in Manhattan, New York

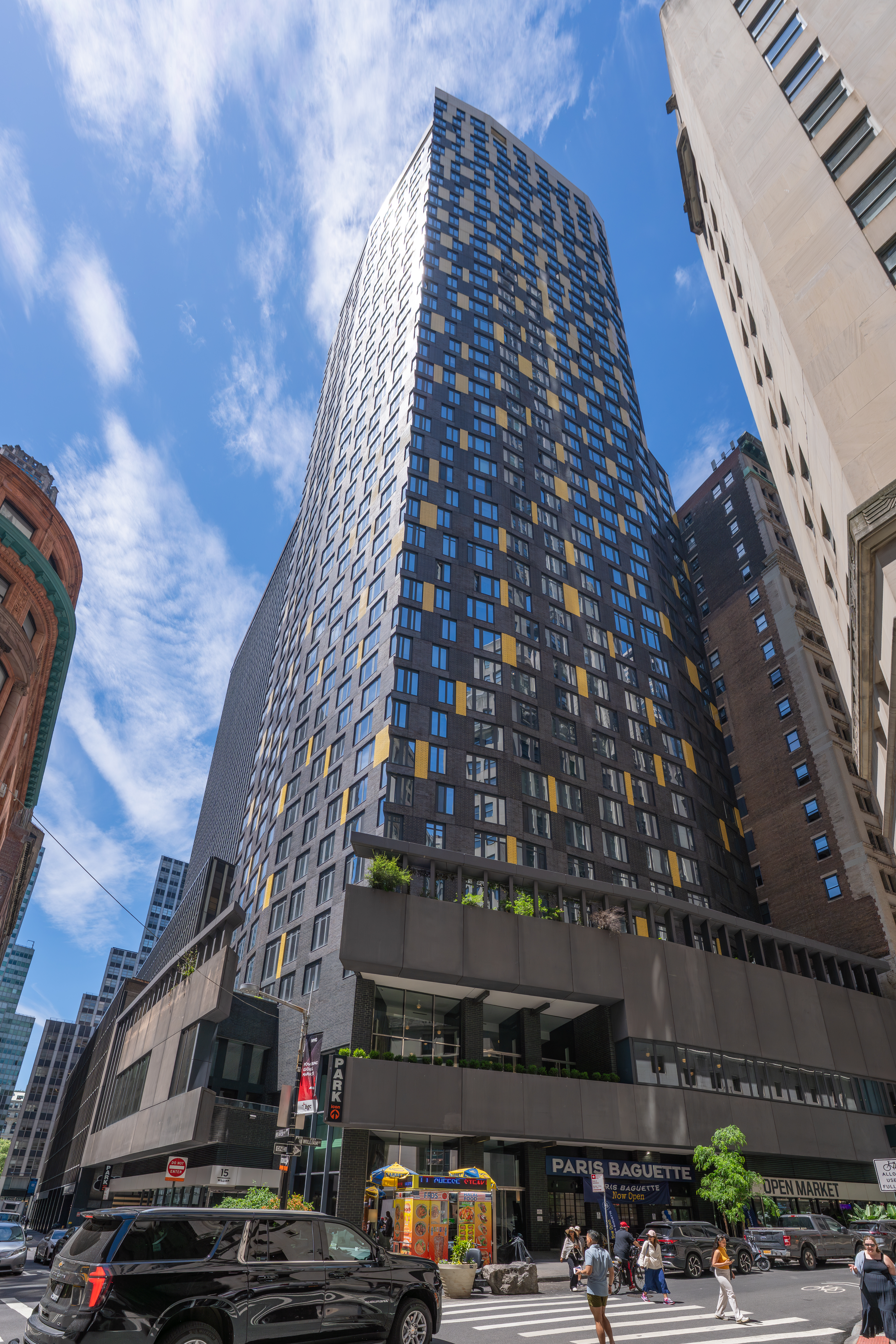

General information
- Status: Completed
- Type: Residential condominium
- Location: 15 William Street, New York, NY 10005
- Coordinates: 40°42′19.44″N 74°0′36″W
- Construction started: 2004
- Completed: 2008

Height
- Roof: 528 feet (161 m)

Technical details
- Floor count: 47

Design and construction
- Architects: Tsao & McKown, Ismael Leyva Architects, SLCE Architects, SPAN Architecture, and Allied Works Architecture
- Developer: SDS Investments, Sapir Organization, André Balazs Properties, and CIM Group

15 William, formerly known as the William Beaver House, is a 47-story, 528-foot-tall (161 m) condominium apartment building at 15 William Street in the Financial District of Manhattan, New York City. It opened in 2008, at which time it was the only ground-up residential development in the Financial District.

15 William was designed by the New York firms Tsao & McKown, Ismael Leyva Architects, and SLCE Architects, with interiors and public spaces designed by SPAN Architecture and Allied Works Architecture. It was developed by SDS Investments, Sapir Organization, André Balazs Properties, and CIM Group.

== Site ==
15 William is located in the Financial District of Manhattan, at the northwest corner of William Street and Beaver Street. The block on which the building is located is bounded by Broad Street to the west, Exchange Place to the north, William Street to the east, and Beaver Street to the south. The site at William and Beaver Streets was historically taken up by the Corn Exchange Bank in the early 20th century, and later by a 20-story office building, although the lot was vacant by the 1990s.

== Architecture ==
15 William, initially known as the William Beaver House, was designed by Tsao & McKown, Ismael Leyva Architects, and SLCE Architects. The interior was designed by SPAN Architecture and Allied Works Architecture. The building was jointly developed by Sapir Organization, SDS Holdings and André Balazs. The building is 528 feet (161 m) high, with 47 floors, and includes 320 residential units and two commercial spaces. There are 370,815 square feet (34,449.8 m^{2}) of space in 15 William.

=== Facade ===
The building has a brick exterior with dark grey and gold brick panels between the windows. Shears, staggers, and other components of the building's facade were incorporated into the building's design to give apartments the most light and views in a part of the city that is densely built. Its general appearance has earned it the nickname the "Post-it note building".

=== Features ===
According to two of the project's principal architects, Calvin Tsao and Zack Mckown, the condominium was designed as a "vertically integrated village" and a "self-sufficient place to live."

The interiors have open living spaces and bathrooms with separate rain showers and oversized deep-soaking tubs. Bedrooms and bathrooms are en suite with louvered doors.

The property includes a fitness center with an outdoor terrace and herb garden, squash court, yoga studio, boxing gym, indoor saltwater swimming pool, outdoor saltwater Jacuzzi, sauna, steam room, an indoor children's playroom, and an outdoor children's playground designed by Jean-Gabriel Neukomm of SPAN Architecture that includes a slate-clad wall for children to use as a chalkboard. The building also has a covered dog-run, landscaped roof deck, rooftop lounge with catering kitchen and views of Manhattan and the New York Harbor, event space, movie theater, an outdoor basketball court, and a resident's library. Residents additionally have the option of renting private storage bins in the basement.

The ground floor of the building includes retail space with a deli and a subterranean parking lot.

== History ==
Plans were filed with the New York City Department of Buildings in 2004, and announced to the public in May 2006; sales were launched later that year. In 2007, the building's three penthouses were each sold for prices ranging between $4.7 to $5 million, the highest price per square foot ever paid in the Financial District at the time. Work was completed in 2008.

== Reception ==
In September 2016, Interior Design listed 15 William one of "5 Enviable Residential Buildings in New York" after renovations to some of its common spaces. New York Family included 15 William on its list of the most family-friendly buildings in New York City. The AIA Guide to New York City called the building "daring amidst the financial district's monochromatic canyons." In 2015, 15 William was featured in a series of articles in Domino Magazine where designers redecorated several apartments throughout the building.
