= Toast point =

Toasted bread triangle

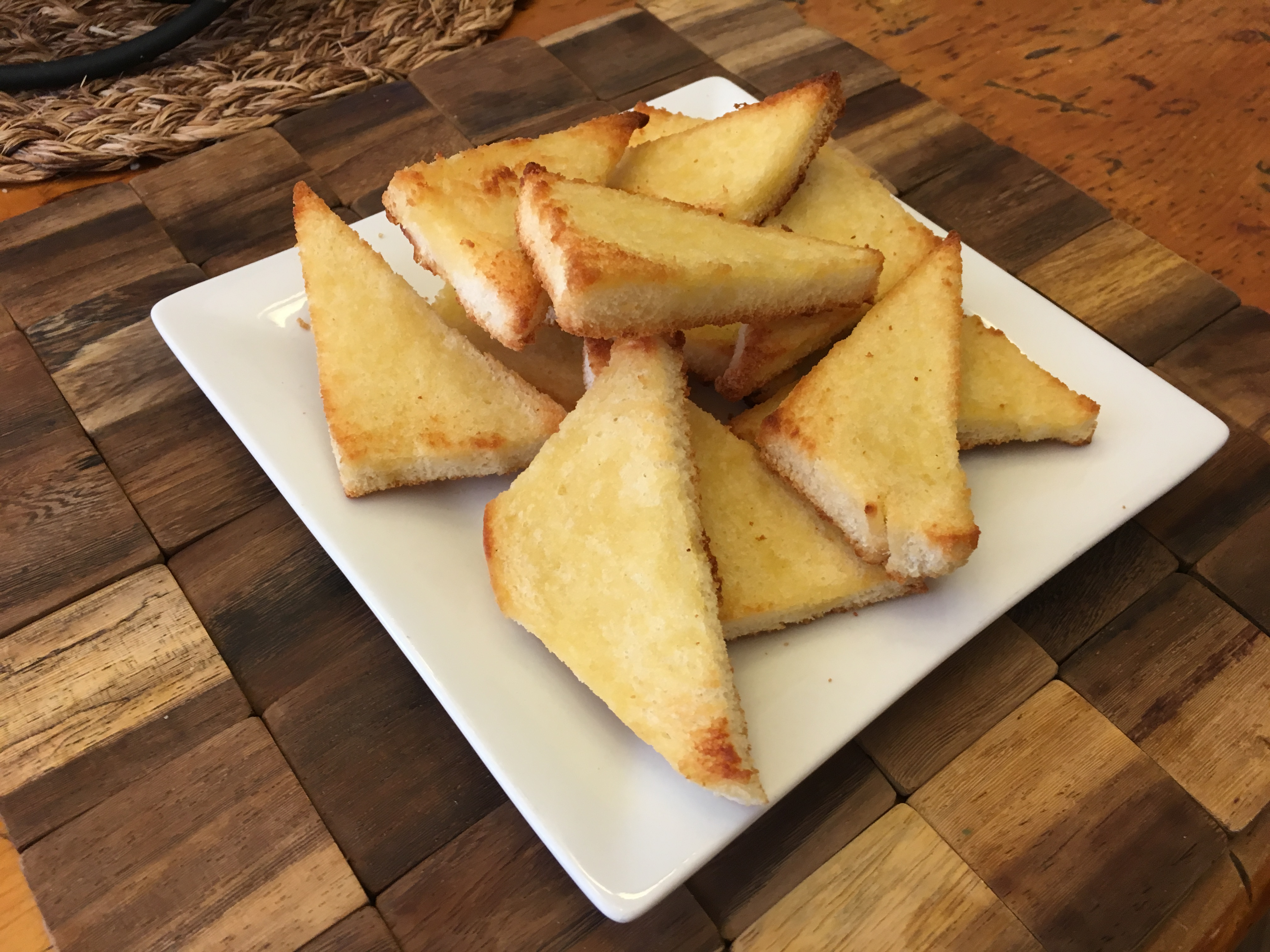
A plate of toast points

A toast point is a triangular slice of bread that has been toasted after the crusts have been cut off. Toast points are commonly served as a side dish or as part of an hors d'oeuvre or snack using ingredients such as caviar and rillettes.

Toast points may be prepared as a part of a dish, as an accompaniment, and are also used as a garnish.

== See also ==
- List of hors d'oeuvre
