= Charles Ranhofer =

American chef (1836–1899)

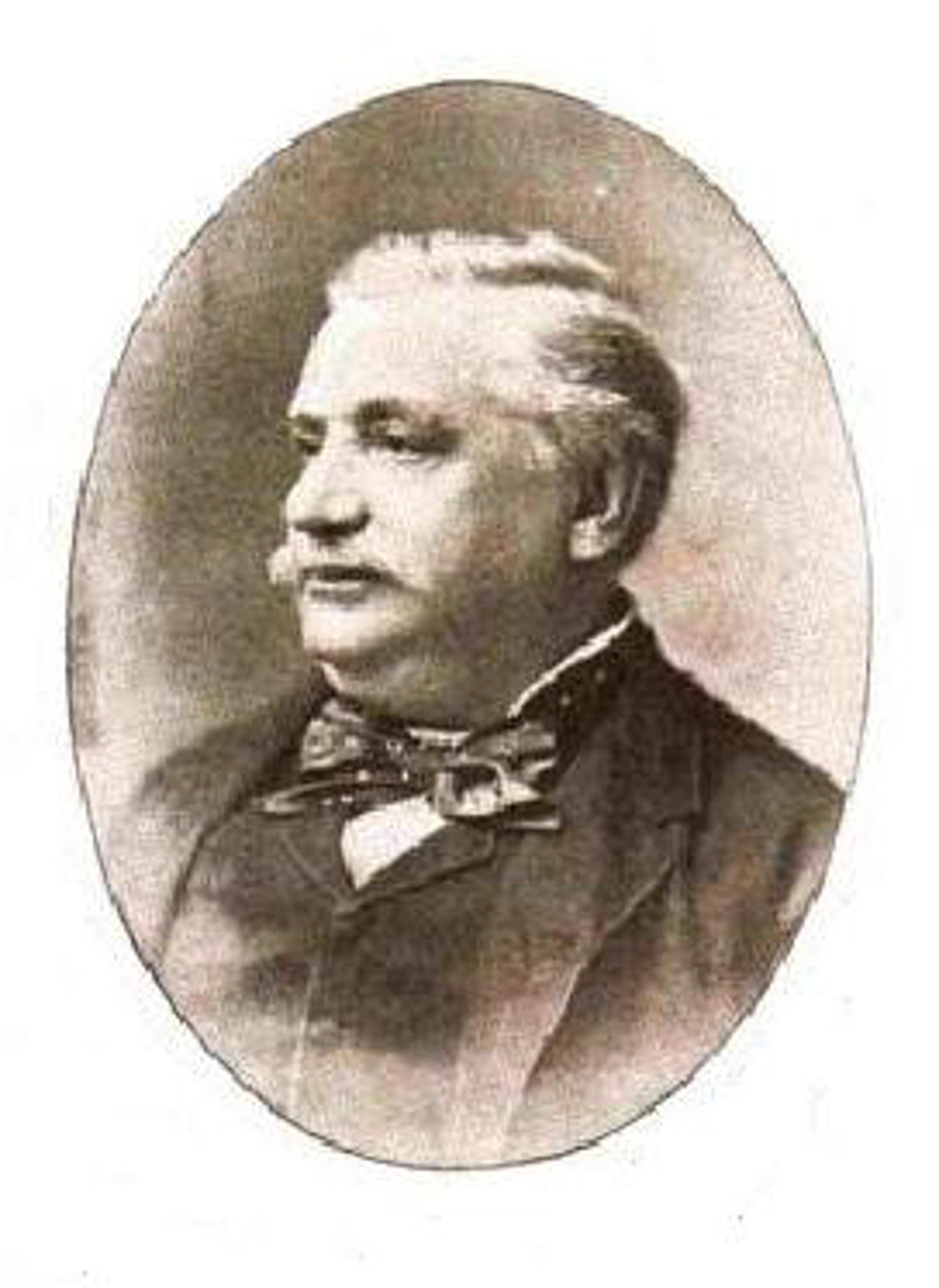
- Portrait of Charles Ranhofer taken from the flyleaf of his book, The Epicurean
- Born: November 7, 1836; Saint-Denis, France
- Died: October 9, 1899 (aged 62); New York
- Culinary career
- Cooking style: Classic French

Charles Ranhofer (November 7, 1836 in Saint-Denis, France – October 9, 1899 in New York) was the chef at Delmonico's Restaurant in New York from 1862 to 1876 and 1879 to 1896. Ranhofer was the author of The Epicurean (1894), an encyclopedic cookbook of over 1,000 pages, similar in scope to Escoffier's Le Guide Culinaire.

== Career ==
Ranhofer was sent to Paris at the age of 12 to begin his training by studying pastry-making, and at 16 became the private chef for the Prince d'Hénin, Comte d'Alsace. In 1856 he moved to New York to become the chef for the Russian consul, and later worked in Washington, D.C., and New Orleans. He returned to France in 1860 for a short time, where he arranged balls for the court of Napoleon III at the Tuileries Palace, but then came back to New York to work at what was then a fashionable location, Maison Dorée. In 1862, Lorenzo Delmonico hired him for Delmonico's, and it was there that Ranhofer made his real fame, though others say that he made the fame of the restaurant as well. At that time, Delmonico's was considered the finest restaurant in the United States. He was the chef at Delmonico's until his retirement in 1896, except for a short hiatus from 1876 to 1879 when he owned the Hotel American at Enghien-les-Bains.

== Recipes ==
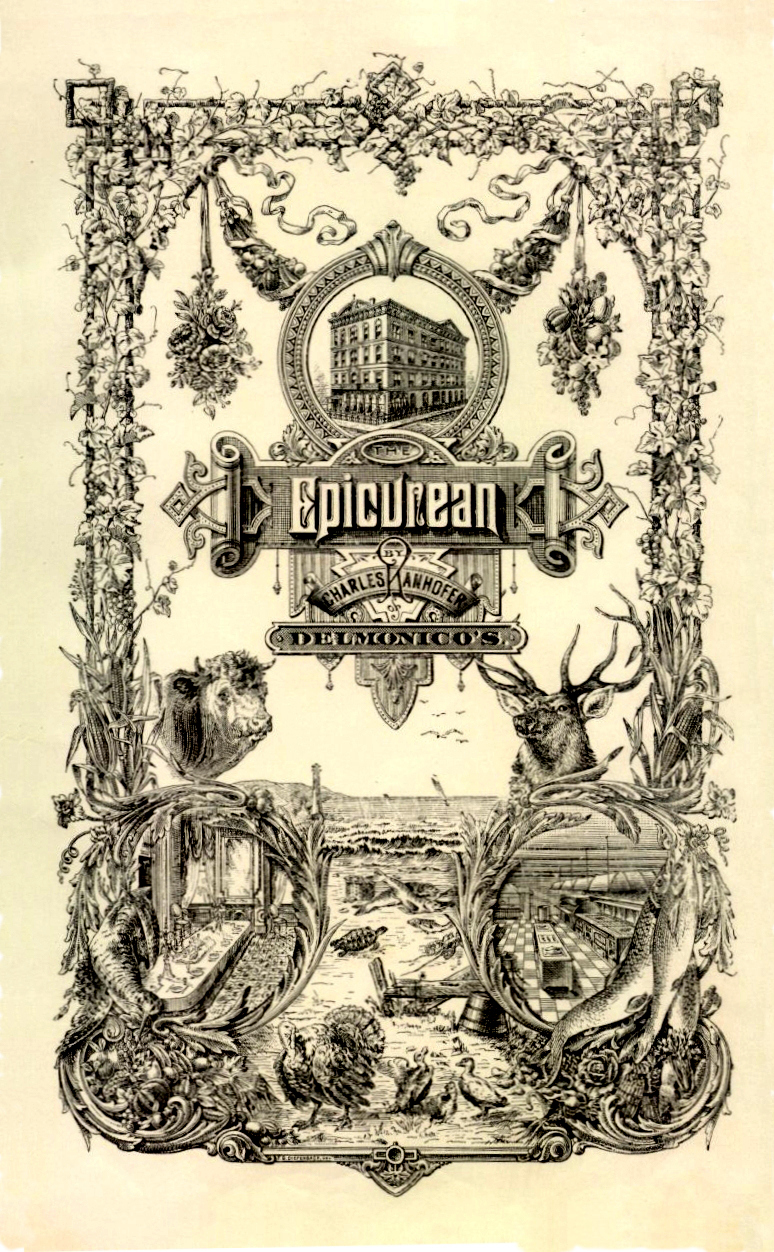
frontispiece of the Epicurean

Ranhofer is credited (often on slim evidence) with inventing or making famous a number of dishes that Delmonico's was known for, such as Lobster Newberg, and had a talent for naming dishes after famous or prominent people—particularly those who dined at Delmonico's—as well as his friends, and events of the day. Examples include:

- Lobster Duke Alexis, named for Grand-Duke Alexis of Russia (later Alexander III) in 1871
- Sarah potatoes, named for Sarah Bernhardt
- Lobster Paul Bert, named for Paul Bert
- Chicken filets Sadi Carnot, named for Marie François Sadi Carnot
- Peach pudding à la Cleveland, named for President Grover Cleveland
- Veal pie à la Dickens and Beet fritters à la Dickens, named for Charles Dickens in honor of his 1867 visit to New York (Neither term appears in Ranhofer's own copy of the menu offered for that visit, but Ranhofer does include recipes for both of them.)
- Salad à la Dumas, named in honor of Alexandre Dumas, père
- Lobster Newberg, named in honor of sea captain Ben Wenberg, then renamed when Wenberg had a quarrel with the restaurant
- Marshal Ney, a dessert named in honor of Marshal Ney

Others may be found under List of foods named after people.

Ranhofer did not invent baked Alaska, nor do the menus he provides in The Epicurean mention anything similar, not even his own Alaska–Florida (the term he himself used for his similar dessert). He also experimented with new foods, acquainting New Yorkers with the "alligator pear" (avocado) in 1895, among other things.

== Death ==
Ranhofer and his wife Rose had eight children: three sons (Charles Leon, Alexandre Estene, and Martial Raoul) and five daughters (Dolet, Blanche Alexandrine Olympe, Marguerite Lucie Genevieve, Rose Georgette Constance, and Rose Jeanne). He died at home of Bright's Disease in October, 1899 and was buried at Woodlawn Cemetery in The Bronx, New York City.
