= Jenny Lind (disambiguation) =

Jenny Lind was a Swedish opera singer.

Jenny Lind may also refer to:

== Places ==
- Qikiqtaryuaq, formerly Jenny Lind Island, in Nunavut, Canada
- Jenny Lind, Glasgow, a district in Glasgow, Scotland, UK
- Jenny Lind, Arkansas, an unincorporated community in the US
- Jenny Lind, California, an unincorporated community in the US

== Vehicles ==
- Jenny Lind locomotive, a locomotive built in 1847 for the London and Brighton Railway
  - 2-2-2, Whyte notation for the classification of steam locomotives usually called a Jenny Lind
- Steamboat Jenny Lind, a steamboat that exploded in 1853 in San Francisco Bay
- Jenny Lind, a ship that wrecked on Kenn Reef in 1850

== Other uses ==
- Jenny Lind (film), a 1932 American film
- Jenny Lind, a polka commonly played in Irish traditional music and Morris dance traditions
- Jenny Lind Children's Hospital, a children's hospital opened in Norwich in 1854

== See also ==
- Jenny Lin (active from 1980s), Taiwanese-born American pianist
- Jenny Lind Porter (1927–2020), American poet
- Cucumis melo 'Jenny Lind', a type of sweet cantaloupe with green flesh
- Jenny Lind's soup, a thick mixture with the consistency of wallpaper paste
