= Otto Goldschmidt =

German pianist, composer and conductor (1829–1907)

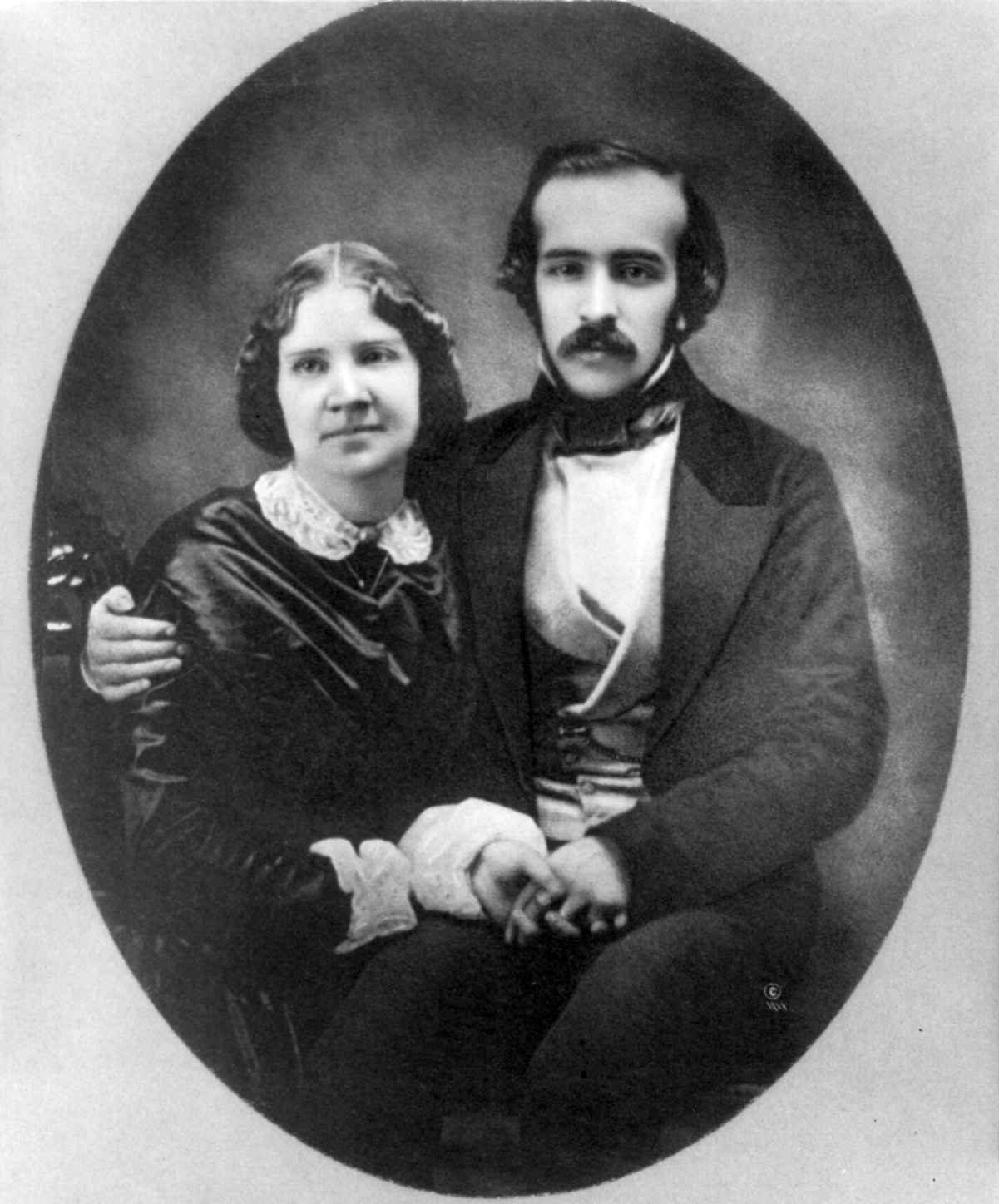
- Goldschmidt and wife Jenny Lind
- Born: Otto Moritz David Goldschmidt; 21 August 1829; Hamburg
- Died: 24 February 1907 (aged 77); South Kensington, England
- Occupations: Pianist; composer
- Spouse: Jenny Lind (m. 1852; died 1887)
- Children: 3

Otto Moritz David Goldschmidt (21 August 1829 – 24 February 1907) was a pianist, composer, conductor and educator, whose works included a piano concerto and other piano pieces, and an oratorio, Ruth, on a biblical theme, written for the Three Choirs Festival. From a prosperous mercantile family in Hamburg, he studied under Felix Mendelssohn at the Leipzig Conservatoire and quickly established himself as a pianist. Among the singers whom he accompanied was the soprano Jenny Lind, known as "the Swedish Nightingale". They toured together in 1851 and married in 1852, after which she insisted on being billed as "Madame Lind-Goldschmidt".

Although Goldschmidt's compositions were regarded as conventional, his work as a teacher and member of the boards of music institutions made him an important figure in British musical life in the latter part of the 19th century. He took British citizenship in 1861. He outlived his wife by twenty years, dying in London aged 77.

== Life ==
=== Early years ===
Goldschmidt was born on 21 August 1829 in Hamburg (now part of Germany, but then an independent city-state). His parents were Moritz David Goldschmidt and his wife Johanna, née Schwabe. Moritz was a prosperous merchant whose firm operated internationally, with branches in Britain as well as Germany; Johanna was an author and prominent social reformer. The couple had eight children, of whom Otto was the eldest. His mother was highly musical, and give him his first piano lessons. He was Jewish.

While still in Hamburg, Goldschmidt studied the piano and harmony with Friedrich Wilhelm Grund and Jacob Schmitt, and in 1843 he became one of the first students at the new Leipzig Conservatoire. For three years he studied there under Felix Mendelssohn, Hans von Bülow, Louis Plaidy and Moritz Hauptmann. While he was a student the singer Jenny Lind gave a concert at the Leipzig Gewandhaus for which the authorities withheld the free tickets usually available to students. Goldschmidt was elected by his peers to protest to the faculty, but was rebuffed. As he was financially able, he purchased a ticket, despite the high prices for the concert, and was greatly impressed by the singer's voice and artistry.

From 1846 to 1848 Goldschmidt taught and performed in Hamburg. In 1848 he was sent to Paris to study with Frédéric Chopin. He arrived in time to hear the composer's last Paris performance, given at the Salle Pleyel in February, but had not begun the intended studies with him when the French Revolution of 1848 broke out within days of the concert. Chopin departed for London, and Goldschmidt followed suit. At the time many leading musicians from the Continent were working in London, including Berlioz, Kalkbrenner, Liszt, Moscheles, Thalberg and Pauline Viardot and, importantly for Goldschmidt's career, Jenny Lind. She, always prominent in charitable work, had recruited fellow stars including Luigi Lablache and Giovanni Belletti for a fund-raising recital in July 1848 at the concert room of Her Majesty's Theatre. To accompany this prestigious line-up she engaged as pianist the nineteen-year-old Goldschmidt, to whom she is thought to have been introduced by Chopin.

=== Lind ===
In March 1849 Goldschmidt and Lind both appeared at two concerts in Sheffield and Nottingham, but did not perform together: Goldschmidt appeared as a soloist and as a duettist with Julius Benedict. He appeared in London again the same month in a concert for the Musical Union. The reviewer in Bell's Weekly Messenger wrote of him:

He is a young pianist of distinguished talent, an eleve of the Conservatory of Leipsic, and immediate pupil of Mendelssohn, whose beautiful trio he executed in manner worthy of his illustrious master. He showed complete command of the instrument, light, yet strong and rapid finger, full and mellow tone, great warmth of expression, and a thorough comprehension of the style and character of the music.

Goldschmidt performed in Hamburg and Leipzig, and in January 1850 he met Jenny Lind again at Lübeck. The memory of Mendelssohn was a bond between the two. He persuaded her to resume singing the lieder of Mendelssohn which, since his death in 1847, she had found emotionally impossible to perform. (Note: In 1848 in London, the year after the composer's death, Lind organised and sang in a performance of Mendelssohn's Elijah at Exeter Hall, which had been composed with her in mind, to raise funds for a new musical prize, the Mendelssohn Scholarship, to be established in the composer's honour.)

In May 1851, at Lind's invitation, Goldschmidt travelled to New York City. She was nearing the end of a long American tour and her accompanist, Benedict, finding the pressure excessive, wished to return to Britain; Goldschmidt took over from him. The relationship between singer and pianist grew increasingly close, and they married in Boston, Massachusetts, on 5 February 1852. The service was performed according to the Episcopalian rite; Goldschmidt had been baptised into that faith shortly beforehand. The couple had two sons and a daughter. From the start of the marriage, Lind insisted on being billed as "Madame Lind-Goldschmidt".

From 1852 to 1855 the Goldschmidts lived in Dresden, making frequent appearances in major European cities, and in 1858 they settled in England, making their home in Roehampton and then Wimbledon. Goldschmidt served as director of music at St John's, a new church in Putney, waiving any salary, to benefit the parish's funds. He took British nationality in 1861. In 1863 he was co-director of the Lower Rhenish Music Festival in Düsseldorf, and in the same year he was appointed a professor of piano at the Royal Academy of Music (RAM) in London. From 1864 to 1869 he advised Frederick Temple on music at Rugby School. In 1866 he became vice-principal of the RAM, and again conducted at the Lower Rhenish festival, this time in his native Hamburg.

In 1876 Goldschmidt and Lind, together with Arthur Duke Coleridge, assembled and trained an amateur choir for the first complete performance in England of Bach's Mass in B minor, which was given on 26 April 1876 at St James's Hall. Reviews were enthusiastic; the choral singing was particularly praised: one critic wrote, "Choral singing, such as we heard on the present occasion, is rarely met with in this or any other country". The concert led to the formation of the Bach Choir, which Goldschmidt conducted until 1885. He edited many works for the choir and revived neglected music including Handel's Ode for St Cecilia's Day.

=== Style, compositions, and musical associations ===
Goldschmidt in later years

The Oxford Dictionary of National Biography says of Goldschmidt as a pianist: "he was a surviving link with Mendelssohn's period, and his style was that of the composer – clear and expressive, but almost without pedal, and he was generally regarded as a dull performer". As a composer, he adhered to the Mendelssohn tradition. His best-known work was the oratorio Ruth (1867), to a libretto by George Grove, premiered at the Three Choirs Festival at Hereford Cathedral in August 1867. There was a warm welcome for Lind's emergence from semi-retirement to sing in the piece, but the music was not enthusiastically received. Goldschmidt's other compositions include a piano concerto, songs, a trio for piano and strings, two pieces for clarinet and piano, numerous pieces and studies for piano solo, and a cantata called Music, for women's voices.

The Times commented in its obituary that although Goldschmidt's compositions made comparatively little mark, "his influence on the art of his time was not inconsiderable". He was elected an honorary member of the Philharmonic Society in 1861, and served on its board of directors; he was a member of the council of the Royal College of Music from its foundation, and he was vice-president of the Royal College of Organists and of the Musical Association.

=== Later years ===
Lind died in 1887, and her widower, The Times noted, threw himself into his musical and administrative duties "with redoubled zeal". In 1891 he published a collection of the cadenzas and ornaments composed by Lind. He was awarded many honours. He was a Knight of the Swedish Order of Vasa (1876), and was given the Swedish gold medal Litteris et Artibus (1893). He owned the original autograph of Beethoven's 1802 letter to his brothers, the Heiligenstadt Testament, and presented it in 1888 to the Hamburg Stadtbibliothek.

Goldschmidt died on 24 February 1907 at his London house in The Boltons, South Kensington, aged 77. He was buried beside his wife in Great Malvern cemetery, not far from the country house they had shared on the Malvern Hills.

== Notes, references and sources ==
=== Sources ===
- Jefferies, Matthew (2011). Hamburg: A Cultural and Literary History. Oxford: Signal Books. ISBN 978-1-90-495575-7.
- Schultz, Gladys Denny (1962). Jenny Lind, The Swedish Nightingale. Philadelphia and New York: J B Lippincott. OCLC 221063.
- Siepmann, Jeremy (1995). Chopin: The Reluctant Romantic. London: Victor Gollancz. ISBN 978-0-57-505692-3.
