= Johanna Goldschmidt =

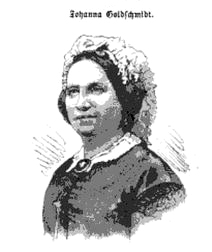
Johanna Goldschmidt (1884)

Johanna Goldschmidt (born Johanna Schwabe on 11 December 1807 in Bremerlehe, died 10 October 1884 in Hamburg) was a German social activist, writer and philanthropist. She played an important role in supporting Friedrich Fröbel and in spreading the concept of the "kindergarten".

== Life ==
=== Family ===
Johanna Schwabe was born on 11 December 1807 in Bremerlehe to Jewish merchant Marcus Hertz Schwabe and Henriette (née Lazarus). In 1812, the wealthy Schwabe family moved to Hamburg. Her father had been one of the founders of the Hamburg Reform Temple in 1817. Johanna was a high-spirited girl, who spoke several languages, played the piano, the violin and the harp, and could also sing very well. Her talents were supported by her teachers.

At the age of 20, Johanna Schwabe married the merchant Moritz David Goldschmidt. The couple had eight children. The eldest son Otto Goldschmidt was a composer, conductor and pianist, who married the Swedish Nightingale, soprano Jenny Lind. The botanist Otto Warburg was her grandson.

=== Work ===
By the 1840s, women such as Johanna Goldschmidt of Hamburg ventured outside the Jewish community to join forces with like-minded Christian women to promote religious tolerance and new approaches to education. In 1847, she wrote her first book, Rebekka and Amalia, written as a series of letters between a young Jew, Rebekka, and a Christian aristocrat named Amalia. "The general topic of the work was the problem of Jewish conversion and assimilation, but in one of its chapters, Goldschmidt focused on a plan for an organization in which rich women would help poorer women to improve themselves by means of lectures and instruction."

In 1848, Goldschmidt became co-founder of the Frauenverein zur Bekämpfung und Ausgleichung religiöser Vorurteile, a women's association to combat and reduce religious prejudice. Since 1848, Johanna Goldschmidt was in contact with Friedrich Fröbel and invited him in November 1849 to Hamburg. This led to the foundation of the Hochschule für das weibliche Geschlecht (1850–1852), the first institution of higher education for women in Germany. In this project she worked closely with liberal Christian women. 22 kindergarten teachers had been educated and the first kindergarten for 70 children had been opened in Hamburg. Her disputation Zur Sache Fröbels, published in 1853, caused a sensation. She defended his pedagogical model against unjust allegations. She also defended the idea of higher education for women to opponents like Karl Gutzkow or against Prussian administration which had been established in Altona in 1867.

In 1860, Goldschmidt founded the Hamburger-Fröbel-Verein. A separate kindergarten was added to a seminary as an exercise center. The seminary is still active as Staatliche Fachschule für Sozialpädagogik (Fröbelseminar). In total, she opened nine kindergartens. Her play, Blicke in die Familie (A Look at the Family), was published in 1860 and opened in Hamburg in 1864.

Johanna Goldschmidt stood in contact with Clara Schumann, Johannes Brahms and the educator Adolph Diesterweg.

== Select publications ==
- Rebekka und Amalia. Briefwechsel zwischen einer Israelitin und einer Adeligen über Zeit- und Lebensfragen. Leipzig 1847.
- Mutterfreuden und Muttersorgen. Worte der Liebe und des Ernstes über Kindheitspflege. Von einer Mutter. Hamburg (Vol.1) 1849, (Vol. 2) 1851.
- Zur Sache Fröbels. In: Rheinische Blätter für Erziehung und Unterricht. (1853).
- Blicke in die Familie. Leipzig 1860.
- Der Hamburger Fröbel-Verein. In: Der Frauen-Anwalt. (1871/1872) No. 1, pp. 33–36.
