= Giovanni Belletti =

Italian opera singer (1813–1890)

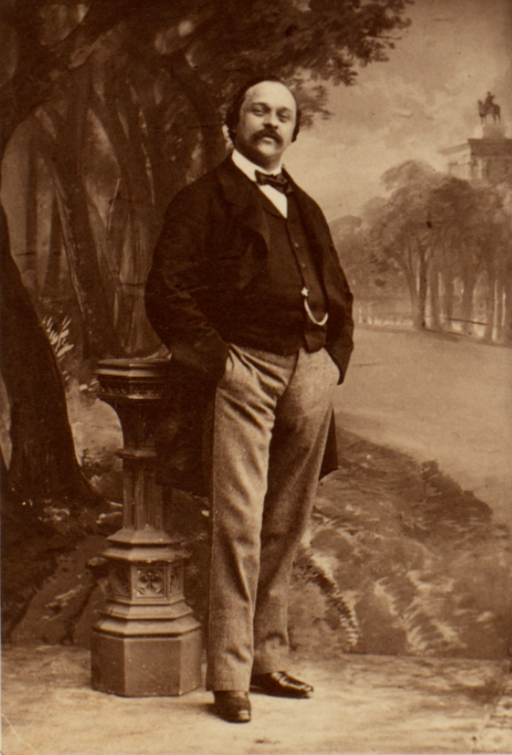
Photograph by Camille Silvy (1860)

Giovanni Battista Belletti (17 February 1813 – 27 December 1890) was an Italian operatic baritone. He appeared in operas in Italy, Stockholm, London and Paris, and supported Jenny Lind in her tour of America.

== Life ==
Belletti was born in 1813 in Sarzana, Italy, son of a local businessman. He showed interest in music at an early age, and his father, being advised to cultivate his son's talent, placed him in the hands of a teacher in the neighbourhood. He was sent soon after, on the teacher's advice, to the Accademia Filarmonica di Bologna, over which Giuseppe Pilotti presided. Pilotti taught him counterpoint as well as singing. After five years of study, Belletti received his diploma.

=== Stockholm ===
His voice was now settled, and was regarded as a baritone of beautiful quality and evenness, with good facility of execution. Advised to try the stage, he hesitated for some time, until he met at Carrara the Swedish sculptor Johan Niclas Byström, who proposed to take him to Stockholm, free from all risk or expense, to lodge in his house, and make his debut; and, if unsuccessful, to send him back on the same terms to Italy. He accepted, and arrived at Stockholm in 1837. Early the next year he appeared in Rossini's The Barber of Seville, achieving his first success about a month earlier than Jenny Lind, with whose career he was so much connected afterwards. With her he sang in Donizetti's Lucia di Lammermoor, Meyerbeer's Robert le diable, and other operas by these composers, translated into Swedish.

=== London and America ===
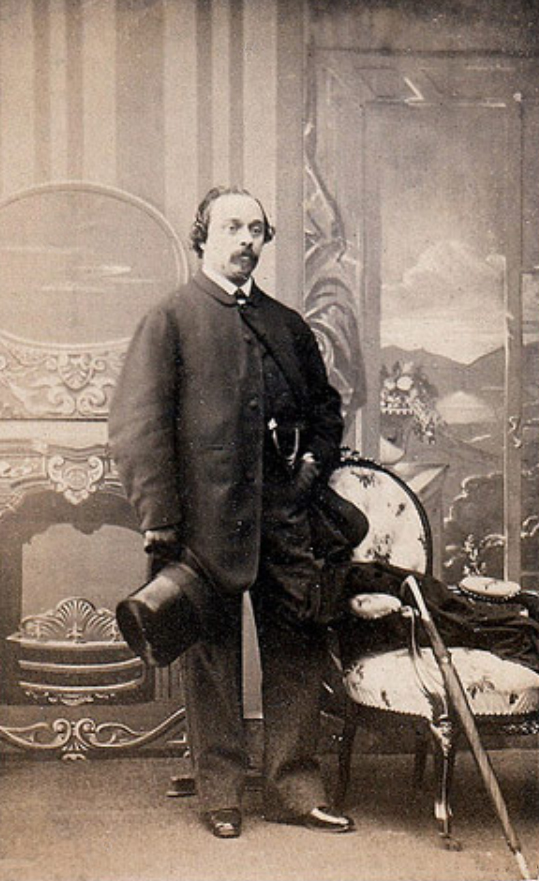
Belletti in Memphis in 1851

When Jenny Lind left Stockholm for Paris, Belletti returned to Italy; but when she came to London, the opera manager Benjamin Lumley, upon her advice, persuaded him to come to sing with her again. In the meantime he had sung with great success at Florence and Livorno, in operas of Rossini and Donizetti. In 1848 he made his first appearance at Her Majesty's Theatre, in London, in Verdi's Ernani, with Sophie Cruvelli, and during that season he sang at both opera houses in London. After singing with no less success in Paris, he was engaged, with Lind and Julius Benedict, by P. T. Barnum, for a tour in the United States from 1850 to 1852; during the tour he maintained his reputation and contributed to the enthusiastic reception which the company obtained in America.

=== Last years ===
Belletti returned to London, and remained there until the end of 1862, singing not only at the Opera, but in classical concerts and oratorios, with undiminished success. He afterwards retired, without a sign of faded powers, to Sarzana, his native place, where he lived a life of seclusion, universally respected, and surrounded by his family and relations. He died in Sarzana in 1890.
