= Cucumis melo 'Jenny Lind' =

Melon cultivar

- Genus: Cucumis
- Species: Cucumis melo
- Cultivar: 'Jenny Lind'

The Jenny Lind melon (Cucumis melo) is an heirloom cantaloupe first introduced in the 1840s. Unlike most other types of cantaloupe, its flesh is light green, rather than orange. A typical fruit weights between one and two pounds, and has a distinct knob, often known as a turban, on one end.

Like other heirloom plants, Jenny Lind melons are generally not grown commercially. However, their seeds are available from a variety of sources, and many home gardeners choose to grow their own. The plant is commonly believed to have been named for the singer Jenny Lind.
