= Jenny Lind's tour of America =

19th-century concert tour

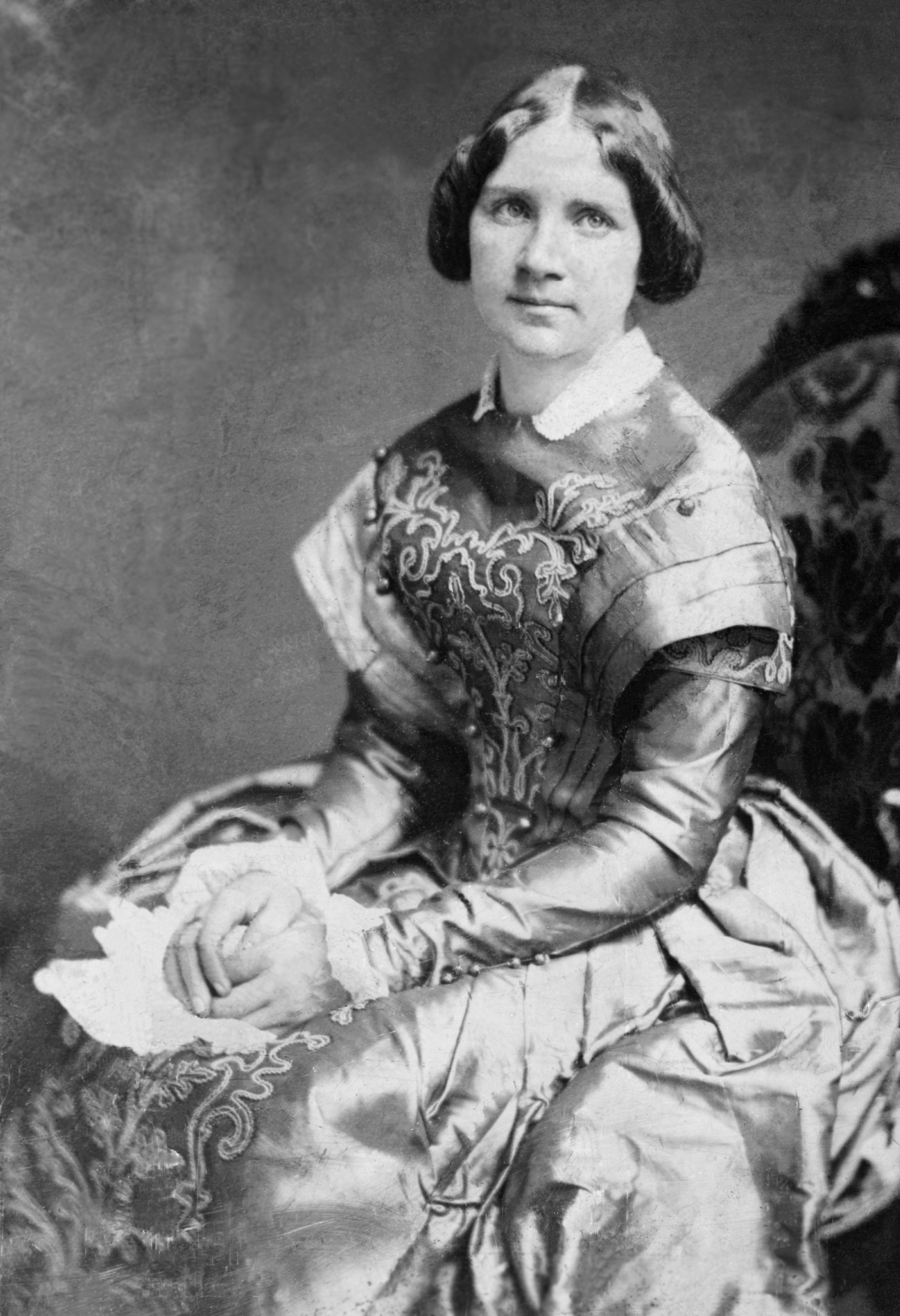
Lind in 1850

The Swedish soprano Jenny Lind, often known as the "Swedish Nightingale", was one of the most highly regarded singers of the 19th century. At the height of her fame, she was persuaded by the showman P. T. Barnum to undertake a long tour of the United States. The tour began in September 1850 and continued into May 1852. Barnum's advance publicity made Lind a celebrity even before she arrived in the U.S., and tickets for her first concerts were in such demand that Barnum sold them by auction. The tour attracted much public excitement, dubbed "Lind Mania" by the local press, and raised large sums of money for both Lind and Barnum. Lind donated her profits to her favored charities, principally the endowment of free schools in her native Sweden.

Lind's concerts featured a supporting baritone, Giovanni Belletti, and her London colleague Julius Benedict as pianist, arranger and conductor. Lind found Barnum's relentless commercial promotion of her increasingly distasteful, and she terminated her contract with him in 1851 under amicable circumstances. She continued to tour for nearly a year under her own management. Benedict returned to England in 1851, and Lind's friend Otto Goldschmidt joined the tour as her pianist and conductor. She and Goldschmidt married in February 1852, and would finish the tour together.

== Background ==
Lind was born in 1820 and enrolled at the Swedish Royal Dramatic Training Academy at age ten. In 1838, she gained fame for her performance at the Royal Swedish Opera as Agathe in Der Freischütz. After this, she was in great demand throughout Sweden and the rest of Europe for a decade. By 1849, when Lind was in the middle of her third triumphant London season, the American showman P. T. Barnum had become aware of her success and the large audiences she attracted. He had toured Europe in 1845 and 1846 with his first great attraction, General Tom Thumb. He had never heard Lind sing, and was by his own admission unmusical, but he knew that concert halls sold out wherever she performed. Furthermore, he was confident that her reputation for philanthropy could be turned to good use in his publicity. In October 1849, he engaged an Englishman, John Wilton, to locate Lind and make her an offer.

Lind wanted to endow free schools in Sweden, and Barnum's offer would allow her to earn a great deal of money. After checking Barnum's credit with a London bank, on 9 January 1850, Lind accepted his offer of $1,000 a night (plus expenses) for up to 150 concerts in the United States. She insisted on the services of Julius Benedict, a German conductor, composer and pianist with whom she had worked in England, and of the Italian baritone Giovanni Belletti as assisting artist, since solo recitals were still unknown to American audiences. Benedict's fee was $25,000 and Belletti's $12,500. All told, Barnum had committed to $187,500 (approximately $7,256,000 today) to bring Lind and her musical troupe to America.

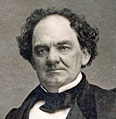
P. T. Barnum

Lind's contract called for the total fee to be deposited in advance with the London banking house of Baring Brothers. Barnum had not anticipated front-end payments for Lind, since he always had paid performers as performances were completed. To raise the money, Barnum sought loans from New York bankers, who refused to make the loans based on a percentage of the Lind tour, so Barnum mortgaged all his commercial and residential properties. Still slightly short, Barnum finally persuaded a Philadelphia minister, who thought that Lind would be a good influence on American morals, to lend him the final $5,000. Barnum sent the $187,500 to London. Lind signed the contract to give 150 concerts in a year or eighteen months, with the option of withdrawing from the tour after sixty or one hundred contracts, paying Barnum $25,000 if she did so.

Few Americans had ever heard of Lind, and Barnum's first press release set the tone of the promotion. "A visit from such a woman who regards her artistic powers as a gift from Heaven and who helps the afflicted and distressed will be a blessing to America." Her biographical pamphlet and photograph proclaimed: "It is her intrinsic worth of heart and delicacy of mind that produces Jenny's vocal potency." Barnum heavily promoted her record of giving frequent benefit concerts for hospitals and orphanages. Before Lind had even left England, Barnum had made her a household name in America. In a statement to the New York Herald, Barnum spoke of the huge sums he had committed, but assured the paper, "If I knew I should not raise a farthing profit I would yet ratify the engagement, so anxious I am that the United States should be visited by a lady whose vocal powers have never been approached by any other human being, and whose character is charity, simplicity and goodness personified."

The Atlantic leaving Liverpool for America, August 1850

In August 1850, before Lind left England, sailing from Liverpool on the paddle steamer Atlantic, Barnum arranged for her to give two farewell concerts at the city's Philharmonic Hall. Of her arrival in Liverpool, The Observer wrote that her reception "was equal to any ever experienced by the most illustrious or royal visitor. Each day a crowd gathered round her hotel, the Britannia Adelphi, and followed the carriage wherever it went." The first concert was a performance of Messiah conducted by Benedict, the second a mixed recital with serious and light items. She was, according to an eyewitness, "literally 'bombarded' with bouquets. She could scarcely make her way out of the orchestra, there was such a heap of flowers in all possible shapes." On the day of her embarkation she was cheered off by thousands of well-wishers on both banks of the River Mersey, and salutes were fired from the shore. A critic engaged by Barnum to cover the concert wrote of the enthusiasm of the Liverpool public and its grief at Lind's imminent departure. This review was widely circulated in English, European and American newspapers a week before Lind arrived in New York. During the voyage she and Benedict gave two concerts for the passengers and crew of the Atlantic. In her travelling party, with Benedict and Belletti, were her companion, Miss Alimanzioni, and her secretary, Max Hjortsberg.

== Arrival in New York City ==
The Atlantic docked in New York on 1 September 1850. The following day, The New York Herald reported on "the spectacle of some thirty or forty thousand persons congregated on all the adjacent piers. ... From all quarters, crowds ... could be seen hurrying down towards the Atlantic's dock." So great was people's desire for a glimpse of the star that several people were "severely bruised, some came off with bloody noses, and two boys, about twelve years of age, appeared to be seriously injured. Had not the rush been checked in time, many lives would have been lost." When she set foot on American soil, Lind kissed her hand to the U.S. flag and exclaimed, "There is the beautiful standard of freedom, which is worshipped by the oppressed of all nations." She further endeared herself to the welcoming crowd by stopping Barnum's coachman from clearing a path through the throng with his whip.

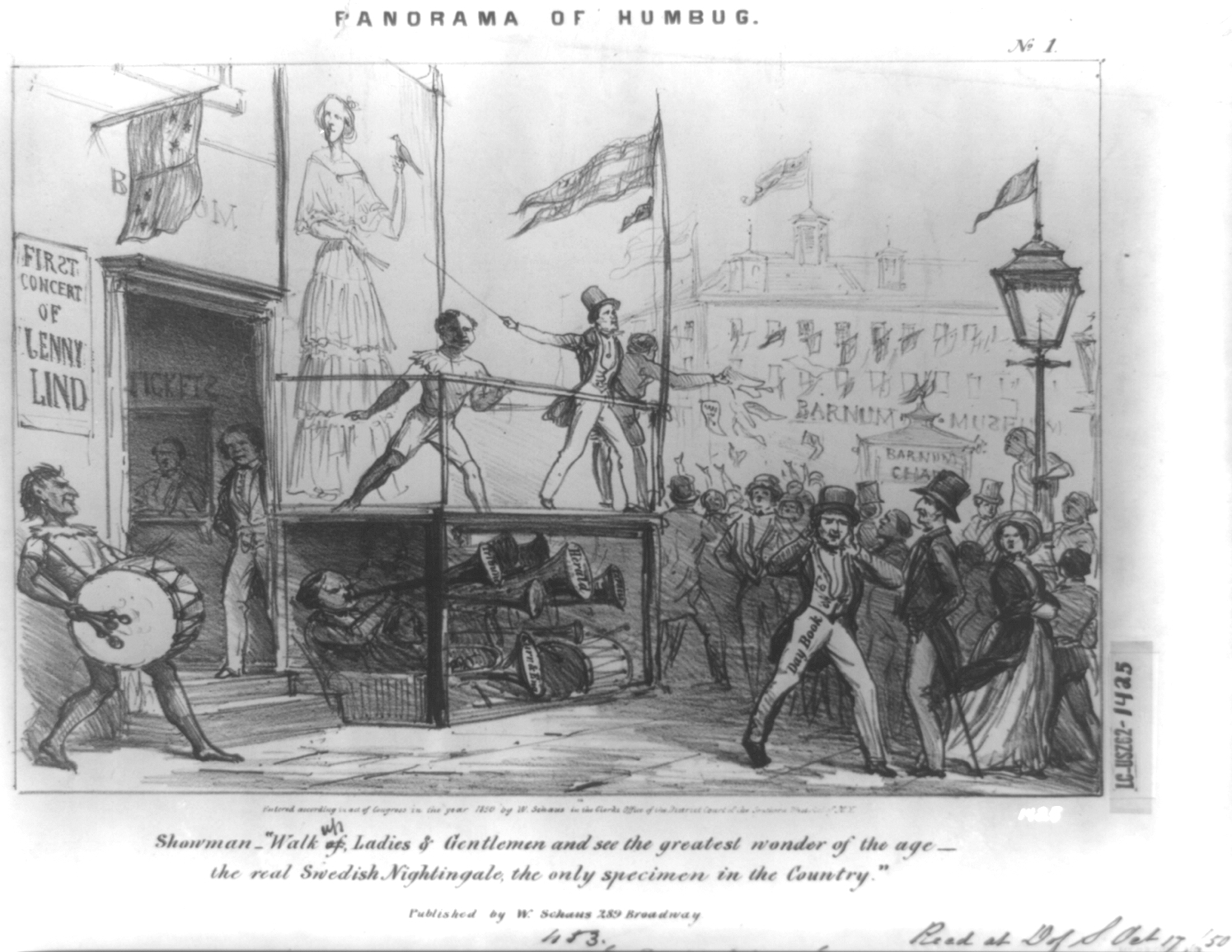
American caricature of Lind's American tour

When she realised how much money Barnum stood to make from the tour, Lind insisted on renegotiating their contract. The new agreement, signed on 3 September 1850, gave her the original $1,000 per concert agreed to, plus the remainder of each concert's profits after Barnum's $5,500 concert management fee was paid. Her interest in increasing her earnings was, it seems, genuinely motivated by her determination to accumulate as much money as possible for her chosen charities, but some commentators were sceptical; one wrote:

I'm a famous Cantatrice, and my name it is Miss Jenny,
And I've come to these United States to turn an honest penny.

To which Barnum is depicted as responding:

We'll welcome you with speeches, with serenades, and rockets,
And you will touch their hearts, and I will tap their pockets;
And if between us the public isn't skinned,
Why my name isn't Barnum nor your name Jenny Lind.

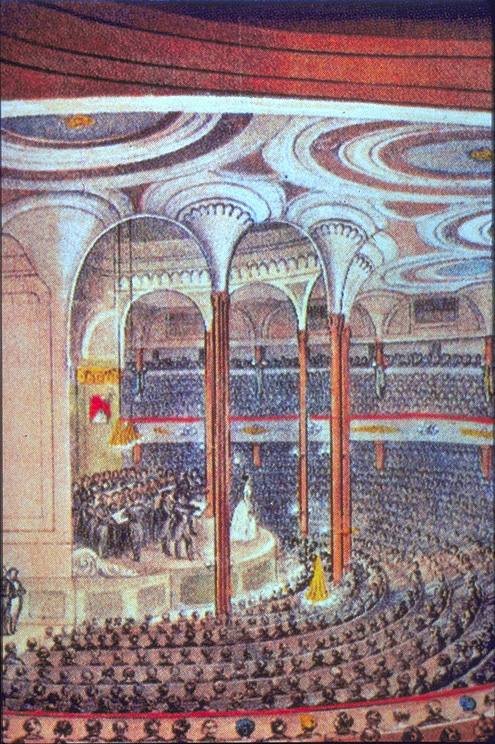
Castle Garden, New York, venue of Lind's first American concerts

Such dissenting voices were in a minority. Lind's appeal in America was, as Barnum had calculated, due as much to her simple and virtuous personality and her generosity to good causes as to her singing. Barnum is quoted as saying "[I]t is a mistake to say the fame of Jenny Lind rests solely on her ability to sing. She was a woman who would have been adored if she had had the voice of a crow."

Lind's first two American performances were given as charity concerts in New York City on 11 and 13 September 1850 at Castle Garden, now better known as Castle Clinton. The seats for the first were sold at auction two days beforehand; 4,476 tickets were sold at a total price of $24,753, with the theatre "packed to its utmost capacity". Hatter John Genin bought the first ticket. The program for the concert states that the orchestra accompanying Lind consisted of 60 players. Lind's numbers that evening were "Casta diva" from Norma; a duet with baritone, "Per piacere alla Signora", from "Il turco in Italia"; a trio for two flutes and voice, to the "echo song" "Dost thou hear?", composed for Lind by Meyerbeer, from The Camp of Silesia, sung in English, "in which she performed some astonishing vocal feats that bordered on ventriloquism", and some Swedish songs. These were regular items in her tour programs, but on this occasion they were joined by a "Greeting to America", a song with words by the local poet, Bayard Taylor, set to music by Benedict. After Lind had left the platform, to tumultuous applause, Barnum took the stage and, although she had asked him not to do so, told the audience that she was taking no fee for herself and donating her entire fee of $10,000 to twelve New York charities. A reporter commented, "The deafening shouts that followed the ... speech were absolutely indescribable – many, even among the male portion of the audience, weeping with emotion."

The blatant commercialism of Barnum's ticket auctions distressed Lind, and for the second concert and thereafter she persuaded him to make a substantial number of tickets available at two dollars for the cheapest seats and one dollar for the promenade.

== Touring ==
Under the management of Barnum, whose publicity always preceded her and whipped up enthusiasm (he had up to 26 journalists on his payroll), Lind and her company toured first in the eastern United States in her own private railroad car, with concerts in Boston, Philadelphia, Washington, D.C. and Richmond, Virginia. Barnum marketed various Jenny Lind-branded products, including songs, clothes, chairs and pianos.

From there they went by ship to Charleston, South Carolina, a short but perilous voyage during which they came close to being sunk by a storm; the ship was at one point reported lost. From Charleston, the company went to Havana, but Lind was less successful there; the local public wanted to see her in opera rather than in concert, and the ticket prices were too high for the general public. From Cuba the party sailed to New Orleans, where Lind was greeted with rapturous enthusiasm. The historian Keith Hambrick has published a study of Lind's time in the city, which includes details of the commercial marketing of her image, unauthorised and of no monetary reward to her, such as Jenny Lind shirts, Jenny Lind cravats, Jenny Lind gloves, Jenny Lind pocket handkerchiefs, Jenny Lind coats, Jenny Lind hats, and even Jenny Lind sausages. Tickets for all of her 13 concerts in New Orleans were so much in demand that a charge was made for admission to the auction for tickets. Hambrick quotes details of the programming of some of the concerts:

The concert began at eight o'clock with selections by the orchestra. The thirty-five musicians, conducted by Julius Benedict and including the distinguished violinist Joseph Burke, played two grand overtures from Auber's opera, Masaniello, and then later in the concert, the famous "Wedding March" from Mendelssohn's celebrated incidental music to A Midsummer Night's Dream. One resident, in complimenting the orchestra, said that he had never heard a group with better balance and that the proportion of instruments was admirable.

Belletti came on before Lind, and after his own numbers he went offstage and escorted her to the platform. She would sing five or so numbers during the course of the concert: on one occasion in New Orleans these were "Come per me sereno", from Bellini's La sonnambula; a buffo duet with Belletti ("Per piacere alla Signora") from Rossini's Il turco in Italia; her trademark trio for voice and two flutes composed for her by Meyerbeer; and to finish the concert, a Swedish song, the "Herdsman's Song", sung in her native language. At other concerts, Belletti sang "Largo al factotum" from The Barber of Seville and Lind sang "Casta diva" from Norma and "I know that my Redeemer liveth" from Messiah.

From New Orleans, the party sailed up river to Natchez, Mississippi, Memphis, Tennessee, and St. Louis, Missouri. After this, they performed at Nashville, Tennessee, where a critic wrote:

The extreme burst of her voice in the upper portion of its register is far beyond the ordinary range of sopranos, and she has acquired the power of moulding the higher notes entirely at her will. By this she is enabled to produce some of the most astonishing effects upon the listener. ... Another of the more special beauties which particularly mark the voice of Mlle Lind is the unexampled quality and delicacy of its piano. ... The transition from the high to the low notes is rapidly effected and seems as though it cost her no effort.

The last stops in the Barnum tour were Louisville, Kentucky, Cincinnati, Ohio, and Pittsburgh, Pennsylvania, where the crowds were so unruly that Lind was trapped in the concert hall for a short time. Stones were thrown at her carriage and into her dressing room, and Barnum hastily rearranged the tour schedule. After a detour to New York, the company returned to Philadelphia. There, Lind and Barnum parted company on 9 June 1851. The separation was amicable, and they remained on good terms afterwards, but Lind had wearied of Barnum's assertive marketing of her. For the rest of her American tour she was her own producer. She extended her itinerary to include Canada, giving a concert in Toronto for which tickets sold out within 90 minutes of going on sale.

In July 1851, the 20-year-old American poet Emily Dickinson gave an account of a Lind concert:

Otto Goldschmidt, who married Lind in February 1852

... how bouquets fell in showers, and the roof was rent with applause – how it thundered outside, and inside with the thunder of God and of men – judge ye which was the loudest; how we all loved Jennie Lind, but not accustomed oft to her manner of singing didn't fancy that so well as we did her. No doubt it was very fine, but take some notes from her Echo, the bird sounds from the Bird Song, and some of her curious trills, and I'd rather have a Yankee. Herself and not her music was what we seemed to love – she has an air of exile in her mild blue eyes, and a something sweet and touching in her native accent which charms her many friends. ... as she sang she grew so earnest she seemed half lost in song. ... She took $4,000 for tickets at Northampton aside from all expenses.

At about the same time, Benedict received an offer from London to take over as musical director at Her Majesty's Theatre. He accepted, and to replace him, Lind invited Otto Goldschmidt, whom she had known for many years. He was nine years her junior, but they formed a close attachment and were married quietly in Boston on 5 February 1852, shortly after he had been baptised an Episcopalian out of consideration for Lind's religious views.

The tour finally returned to New York in May 1852. The New York Times reported, "Madame Goldschmidt's Farewell Concert, last evening, was attended by the largest and finest audience we ever saw assembled in New-York. The vast area of Castle Garden was crowded to its utmost capacity, and thousands thronged the passage ways – the covered bridge leading from the Garden to the Battery, and the walks into the street far beyond the outer gates." Her best known numbers were joined on this occasion by a new song "Farewell to America", with words by C.P. Cranch and music by Goldschmidt. On 29 May 1852, Lind, Goldschmidt and the party sailed from New York back to England.

=== Lind's views on slavery ===
At the time of her tour, the debate over slavery in the United States had been intensified by the Compromise of 1850. American abolitionists attempted to secure Lind's support for their cause, but she refused to comment on the institution; Barnum publicly refuted rumors that Lind had donated $1,000 to an abolitionist group, eager to avoid damaging her reputation in the American South. After meeting her at Rochester, New York, in July 1851, British abolitionist Judith Griffiths wrote that "the colored people are regarded by her as beneath humanity – and too unworthy to be educated. ... She seemed horrified at colored people – I now know for myself that she is thoroughly pro-slavery – I am so grieved."

Abolitionist lawyer Maunsell Field wrote that "she had an abhorrence for negroes she could not overcome. 'They are so ugly', she used to say." Yet in June 1852 Lind donated $100 to Harriet Beecher Stowe to free the Edmonsons, a Black family enslaved in Washington, D.C., praising Uncle Tom's Cabin as "having been a strong means in the Creator's hand of operating essential good in one of the most important questions for the welfare of our black brethren." Historian Joan D. Hedrick suggested that Stowe's book "may have changed Lind’s heart" and that ambivalent views on abolitionism and race were not unusual for the era.

== Legacy ==
=== Charities ===
Lind gave 93 concerts in the United States for Barnum, earning her about $350,000; Barnum netted at least $500,000. From the outset, Lind had determined to give all her fees to charity. Her principal beneficiaries were free schools in her native Sweden, but she also distributed her U.S. concert earnings to local charities, including $1,000 to help build a church in Chicago, and $1,500 for the "mother church" of the Lutheran Augustana Synod in Andover, Illinois.

In September 1850, Lind gave $5,000 (approximately $194,000 today) to her Swedish friend, Poly Von Schneidau, for a new camera for his Chicago studio, later used to create one of the earliest images of Abraham Lincoln. On 14 September 1850, Von Schneidau took the first American daguerreotype of Lind at the New York Mathew Brady Studio. His photo of Lind is in the Library of Congress Collection.

=== Memorials ===
Lind visited Mammoth Cave in central Kentucky in 1851. A feature in the cave, called "Jenny Lind's Armchair", was named in her honour. The community of Jenny Lind, California, was named after her, although she did not visit the state during the tour. Cottage-style spindled furniture is still named for her, especially Jenny Lind cribs and beds. The tour is a plot point in the 1980 musical Barnum and the 2017 film The Greatest Showman, both of which include a fictionalized relationship between Lind and Barnum with "romantic undertones".
