= Anton Wallerstein =

German violinist and composer (1813–1892)

Anton Wallerstein (28 September 1813 – 26 March 1892) was a German violinist and composer, a prolific writer of popular dances and songs.

== Biography ==
The son of a Jewish merchant, Anton Wallerstein was born in Dresden on 28 September 1813. According to George Grove in A Dictionary of Music and Musicians (1900) his family was impoverished at the time of his birth; however musicologist Edmund Sebastian Joseph van der Straeten states the opposite in The History of the Violin (1968) saying he was from a "well-to-do family". He began playing publicly as a violinist at the age of nine in taverns, and also performed in private homes. At the age of ten he was the leader of a string quartet in public concerts playing music by Pierre Rode.

In 1827 Wallerstein went to Berlin where he impressed an audience in a concert at the Berlin Hofoper. There he became acquainted with Giacomo Meyerbeer and Gaspare Spontini In 1828 he had success as a violinist in Leipzig, before becoming violinist in the Dresden Court Orchestra in 1829. In 1832 he left that post to join the court orchestra in Hanover where he remained until 1837. After this he worked as the conductor for a touring French theatre troupe for a few years until returning to Hanover. He mainly retired from performance soon after in 1841 to devote himself to composition; although he later performed concerts of his dance music in Paris and London in 1853 and 1855.

Wallerstein was active as a composer from 1830 to 1877. He produced a great quantity of dance music, chiefly published by Schott & Co of Mainz. There are 275 works with opus numbers. His dances had a prodigious vogue during their day in Germany, France, and England, in all classes of society. Among these are "La Coquette", "Redova Parisienne", "Studentengalopp" and "Erste und lezte Liebe". His songs also were popular, such as "Das Trauerhaus" and "Sehnsucht in die Ferne".

Wallerstein died in Geneva on 26 March 1892. His is buried at the Old Jewish Cemetery, Dresden.
