= Jenny Lind's soup =

Type of soup

- Type: Soup
- Main ingredients: Rutabaga, chicken stock, roux, Gruyère cheese, sago, egg yolks, heavy cream, egg whites

Jenny Lind's soup is a soup named for popular 19th-century singer Jenny Lind. She is supposed to have used this soup to soothe her chest and found it to be beneficial to her voice before performances.

The dish is made from mashed rutabaga or sago, chicken stock thickened with a roux, Gruyère cheese, sage, egg yolks, and heavy cream, and topped with beaten egg whites. (This topping, unfamiliar to many, is a common tradition in French cuisine de famille, as it uses up the whites left over from using the yolks as a thickener).

The soup is mentioned in Isabella Beeton's Mrs Beeton's Book of Household Management (1861). The information was taken, uncredited, from Eliza Acton's Modern Cookery for Private Families in the expanded edition (1855). Acton is likely to have received the recipe by way of her friend Mary Howitt, translator of Swedish writer Fredrika Bremer, but she acknowledges only "the kindness of the very popular Swedish authoress, Miss Bremer".

== In popular culture ==
The soup was the hook for a joke in many British and Irish newspapers, including the Western Daily Mercury, for more than sixty years: "“Why would Jenny Lind make good soup?" – "Because she's neither Alboni (all bony) nor Grisi (greasy)".

Leopold Bloom, a character in James Joyce's Ulysses, fantasizes about it while lunching in the Ormond Hotel: "Jenny Lind soup: stock, sage, raw eggs, half-pint of cream. For creamy dreamy."

== See also ==
- List of soups
