= Julius Benedict =

German-born composer and conductor (1804–1885)

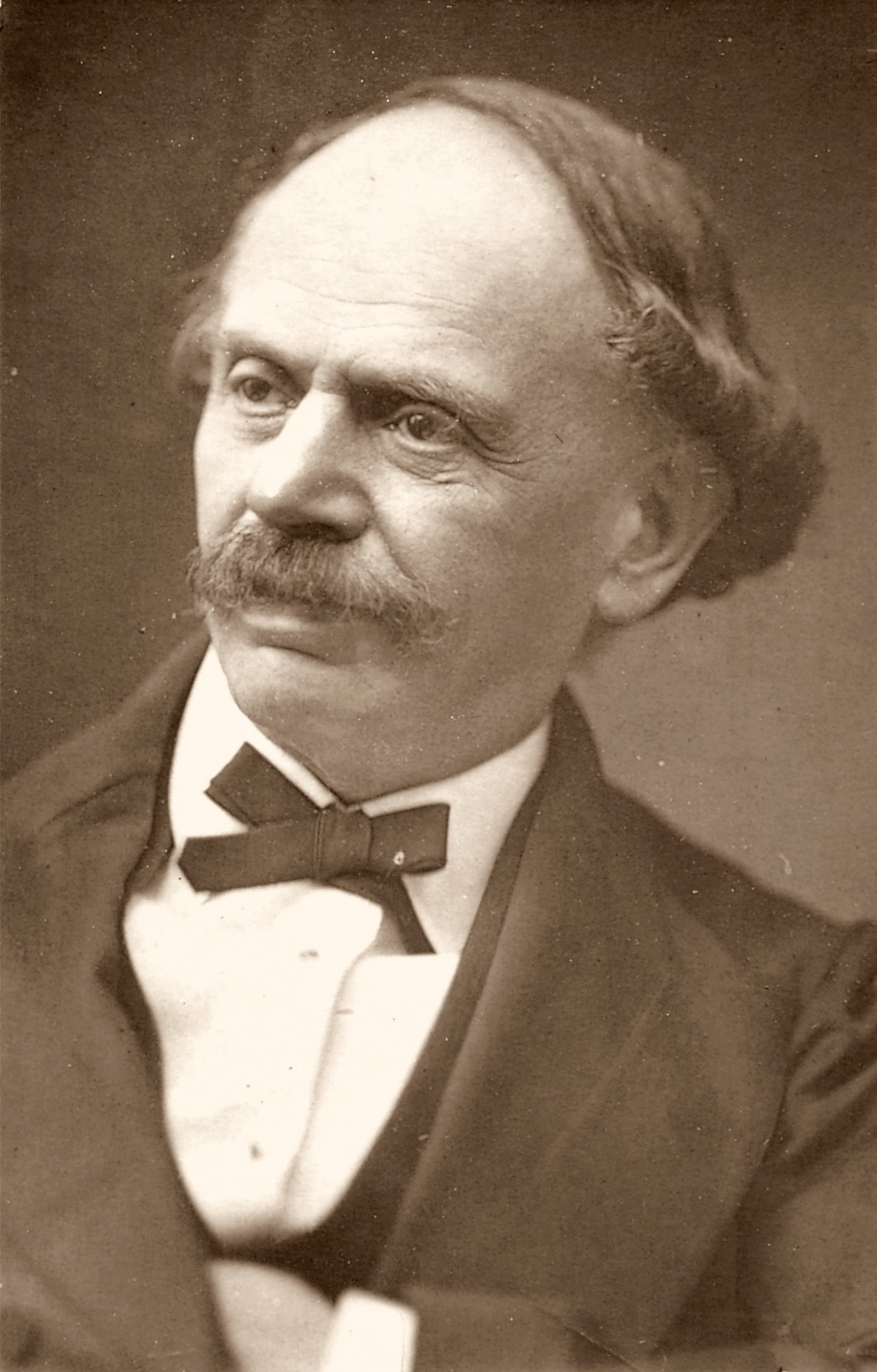
- Born: 27 November 1804; Stuttgart, Germany
- Died: 5 June 1885 (aged 80); Manchester Square, England
- Occupation: composer

Sir Julius Benedict (27 November 1804 – 5 June 1885) was a German-born composer and conductor, resident in England for most of his career.

== Life and music ==
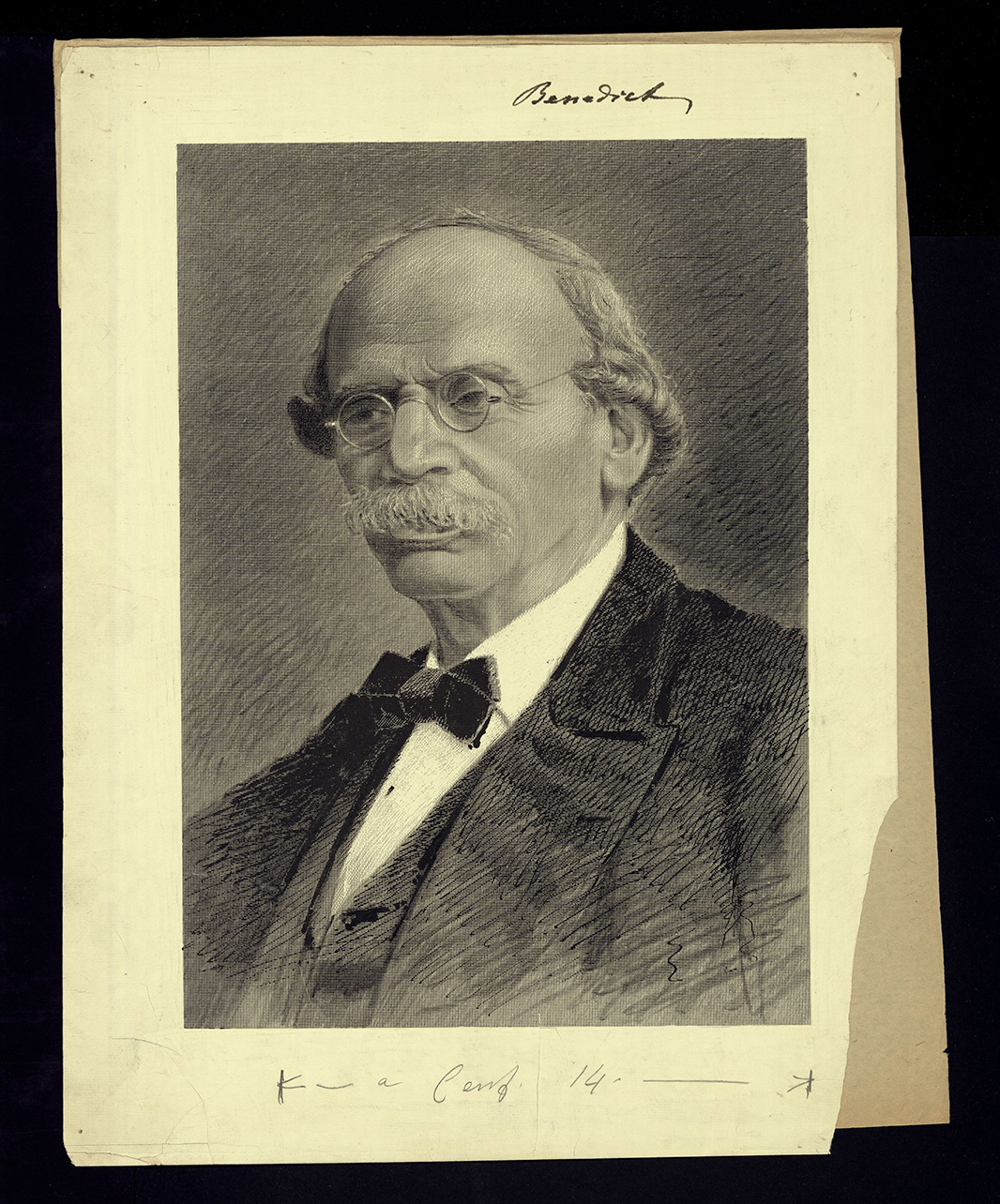
Portrait of Julius Benedict, composer (1804–1885), before 1885.

Benedict was born in Stuttgart, the son of a Jewish banker, and in 1820 learnt composition from Johann Nepomuk Hummel at Weimar and in 1821 from Carl Maria von Weber at Dresden; it was Weber who introduced him in Vienna to Beethoven on 5 October 1823. In the same year, he was appointed Kapellmeister of the Kärnthnerthor theatre at Vienna, and two years later in 1825, he became Kapellmeister of the San Carlo theatre at Naples. It was here he gave piano lessons to the young prodigy Theodor Döhler.

In Naples his first opera, Giacinta ed Ernesto, premiered in 1827, and another, written for his native city, I Portoghesi in Goa, was given there in 1830; neither of these was a great success, and in 1834 he went to Paris, leaving it in 1835 at the suggestion of Maria Malibran for London, where he spent the remainder of his life. In 1836 he was given the conductorship of an operatic enterprise at the Lyceum Theatre, and brought out a short opera, Un anno ed un giorno, previously given in Naples.

In 1838 he became conductor of the English opera at Theatre Royal, Drury Lane during the period of Michael William Balfe's great popularity; his own operas produced there were The Gipsy's Warning (1838), The Brides of Venice (1844), and The Crusaders (1846). In 1848 he conducted his lifelong friend Felix Mendelssohn's Elijah at Exeter Hall, for the first appearance of Jenny Lind in oratorio, and in 1850 he was the accompanist and conductor on Lind's tour of America.

On his return in 1852 he became musical conductor under James Henry Mapleson's management at Her Majesty's Theatre (and afterwards at Drury Lane), and in the same year conductor of the Harmonic Union. Amongst his minor works is an Andantino for Concertina and Fortepiano written in 1858. Benedict wrote recitatives for the production of an Italian-language version of Weber's Oberon in 1860 (it was then the tradition in England to perform German operas in Italian). In the same year his cantata Undine was produced at the Norwich Festival, in which Clara Novello appeared in public for the last time.

His best-known opera, The Lily of Killarney, written on the subject of Dion Boucicault's play The Colleen Bawn to a libretto by John Oxenford, was produced at Covent Garden in 1862. His operetta The Bride of Song was brought out there in 1864.

Benedict wrote a march for the wedding of Albert Edward, Prince of Wales and Alexandra of Denmark in 1863. St Cecilia, an oratorio, was performed at the Norwich Festival in 1868; St Peter at the Birmingham Festival of 1870; Graziella, a cantata, was given at the Birmingham Festival of 1882, and in August 1883 was produced in operatic form at the Crystal Palace. Here also a symphony by him was given in 1873. In the autumn of 1875, Benedict corresponded with W. S. Gilbert about collaborating on a comic opera with him, but Gilbert had too many projects and the idea was dropped.

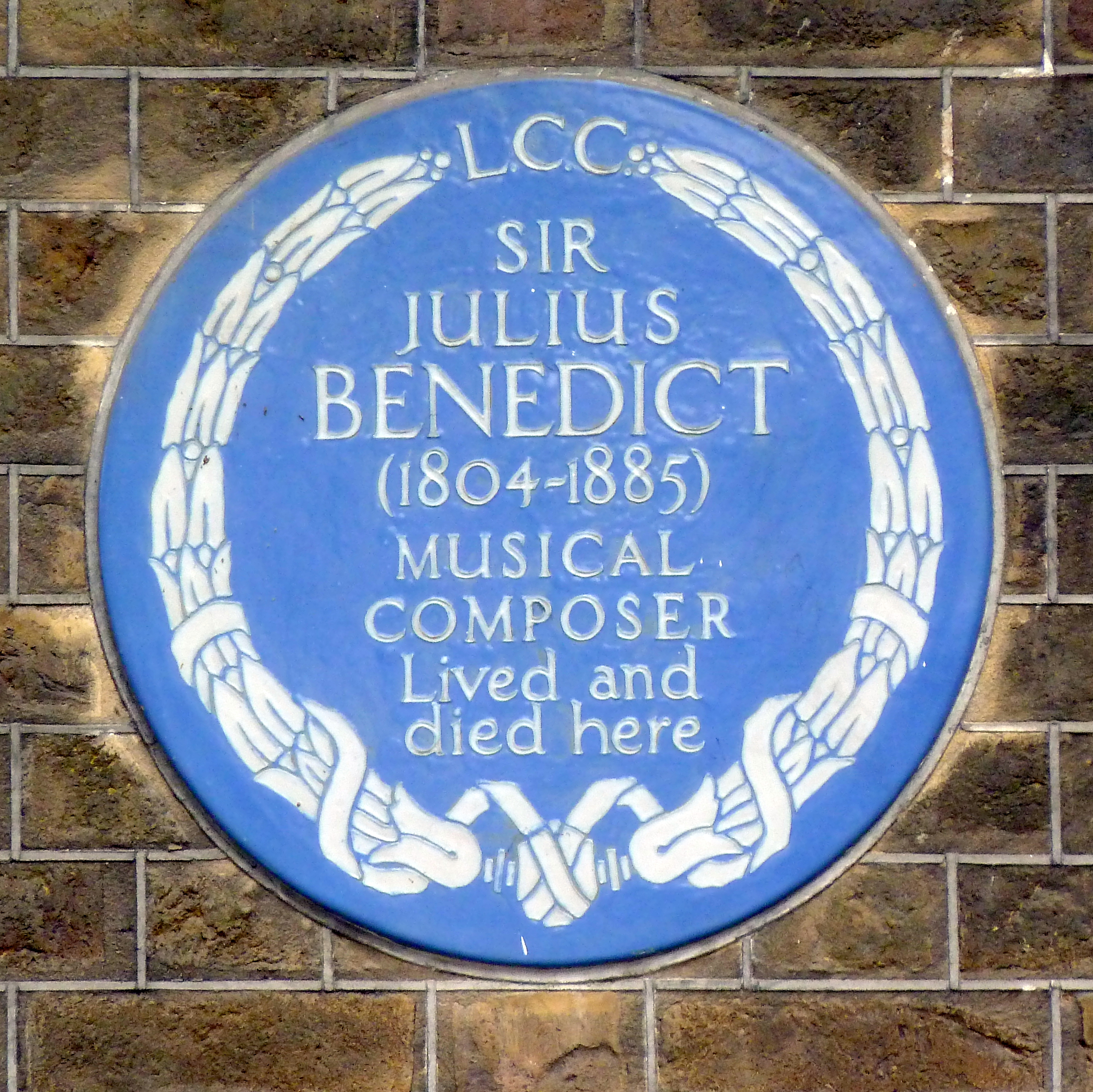
Plaque commemorating Benedict

Benedict conducted every Norwich Festival from 1845 to 1878 inclusive, and the Liverpool Philharmonic Society's concerts from late 1867 to 1880. He was the regular accompanist at the Monday Popular Concerts in London from their start, and with few exceptions acted as conductor of these concerts.

He contributed an interesting life of Weber to the series of biographies of Great Musicians. In 1871 he was knighted, and in 1874 was made knight commander of the orders of Franz Joseph I of Austria and Frederick I of Württemberg. In 1884, friends set up a benefit fund to aid him financially. He died at his residence in London on 5 June 1885 and was buried in Kensal Green Cemetery.

Benedict had three daughters (Adeline, Georgina and Alice) and two sons (Ernest and Julius) with his first wife, Therese. Therese and his younger son Julius died within a year of each other, between 1851 and 1852. At some point in his life, Benedict converted to Christianity; his children's education included Roman Catholic sacraments. A London County Council blue plaque commemorates Benedict at 2 Manchester Square, Marylebone, where he lived and died.

== Compositions (selective list) ==
=== Orchestral ===
- 1827 – Concertino No.1, for piano and orchestra, Op.18 (fp. Teatro del Fondo, Naples, 26 May 1827) [later incorporated into Piano Concerto in A flat, 1867]
- 1833 – Concertino No.2, for piano and orchestra, Op.19 (fp. King's Theatre, London, 1837) [later incorporated into Piano Concerto in E flat, 1867]
- c.1850 – Festival Overture, Op.42
- 1850 – Konzertstück [Piano Concerto No.1] in C minor, for piano and orchestra, Op.45 (fp. Philharmonic Society, London, 17 June 1850)
- 1862 – The Octoroon, overture
- c.1865 – Le ménestrel, overture. Op.76
- c.1865 – The Tempest, overture, Op.77
- 1867 – Piano Concerto [No.2] in E flat, Op.89 (fp. Crystal Palace, London, 27 April 1867)
- 1867 – Piano Concerto [No.3] in A flat, Op.90
- 1868 – La selva incantata, overture (fp. Philharmonic Society, London, 6 July 1868)
- 1872-73 – Symphony No. 1 in G minor, Op.101 (andante and scherzo performed Norwich Festival, 1872; first complete performance Crystal Palace, London, 22 November 1873)
- 1874 – Alfred and Marie, grand march [celebrating the marriage of the Duke of Edinburgh]
- 1874-76 – Symphony No. 2 in C (scherzo performed British Orchestral Society, St James's Hall, London, 22 January 1874; three movements performed Crystal Palace, London, 17 April 1875)

=== Choral and vocal ===
- 1822 – L'amor timido, cantata (fp. Stuttgart, August 1822)
- 1860 – Undine, cantata (fp. Norwich Festival, 1860)
- 1863 – Richard Coeur de Lion, cantata (fp. Norwich Festival, 17 September 1863)
- 1866 – The Legend of St Cecilia, cantata (fp. Norwich Festival, 1 November 1866)
- 1870 – St Peter, oratorio (fp. Birmingham Festival, 2 September 1870)
- 1882 – Graziella, cantata (fp. Birmingham Festival, 29 August 1882)
- 1883 – Mary Stuart's Farewell, scena for contralto and orchestra (fp. Philharmonic Society, London, 25 April 1883)

=== Operatic ===
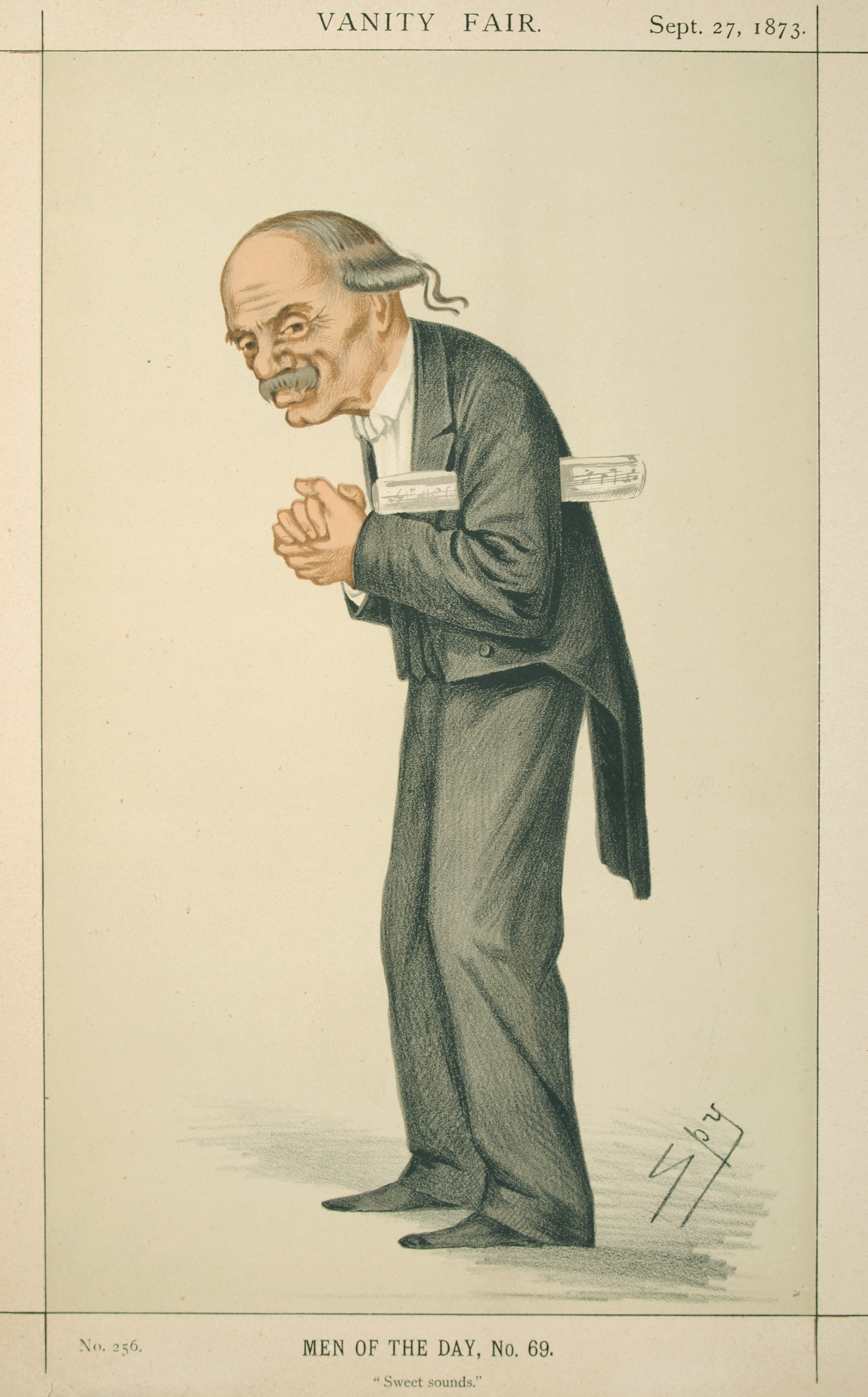
Benedict by Spy in "Vanity Fair", 1873

- 1827 – Giacinta ed Ernesto (fp. Teatro del Fondo, Naples, 31 March 1827)
- 1830 – I portoghesi in Goa (fp. Stuttgart, 1830; Teatro San Carlo, Naples, 28 June 1830)
- 1836 – Un anno ed un giorno (fp. Teatro del Fondo, Naples, 19 October 1836)
- 1838 – The Gypsy's Warning (fp. Drury Lane Theatre, London, 19 April 1838)
- 1844 – The Brides of Venice (fp. Drury Lane Theatre, London, 22 April 1844)
- 1845-46 – The Crusaders (fp. Drury Lane Theatre, London, 26 February 1846)
- 1861-62 – The Lily of Killarney (fp. Covent Garden Theatre, London, 10 February 1862)
- 1864 – The Bride of Song, operetta (fp. Covent Garden Theatre, London, 3 December 1864)

=== Incidental music ===
- 1882 – Romeo and Juliet (fp. Royal Lyceum Theatre, London, May 1882)

=== Other music ===
- 1858 – Andantino for Concertina and Fortepiano
- 1876 – Andantino, arranged by the composer for four performers on two pianofortes
- 1884 – Andantino, the 1876 arrangement arranged by Harry Drew for the organ.

Cantata - 78 giri HMV 1927 "La zingara e l'uccello - Amelita Galli Curci

== See also ==
- Royal Liverpool Philharmonic
