= Jenny Lind =

Swedish opera singer (1820–1887)

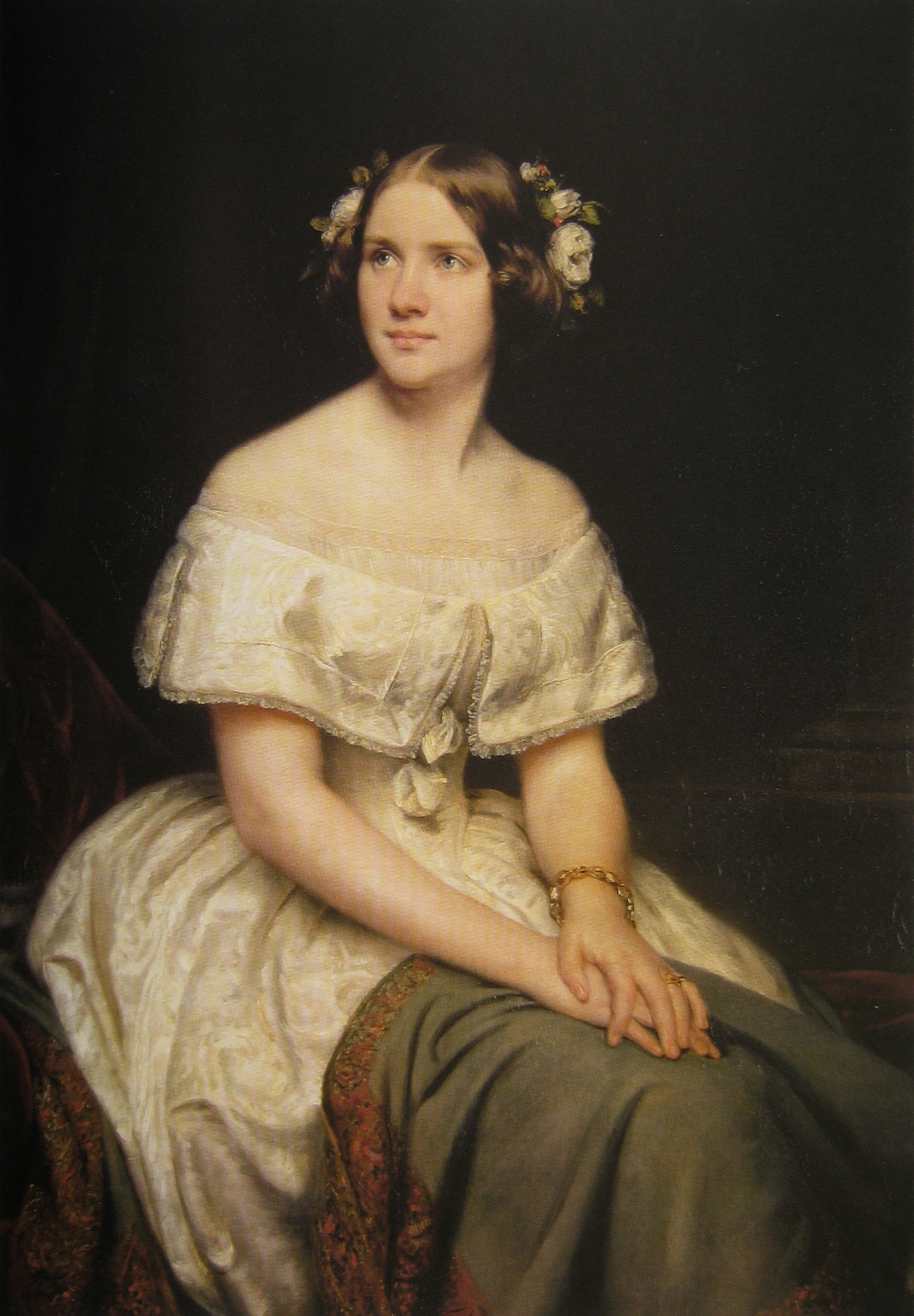
- 1862 portrait
- Born: Johanna Maria Lind; 6 October 1820; Stockholm, Sweden
- Died: 2 November 1887 (aged 67); Herefordshire, England
- Occupation: Opera singer
- Spouse: Otto Goldschmidt (m. 1852)

Johanna Maria "Jenny" Lind (Madame Goldschmidt) (6 October 1820 – 2 November 1887) was a Swedish opera singer, often called the "Swedish Nightingale". One of the most highly regarded singers of the 19th century, she performed in soprano roles in opera in Sweden and across Europe, and undertook an extraordinarily popular concert tour of the United States beginning in 1850. She was a member of the Royal Swedish Academy of Music from 1840.

Lind became famous after her performance as Agathe in Der Freischütz at the Royal Swedish Opera in 1838. Within a few years, she had suffered vocal damage, but the singing teacher Manuel García saved her voice. She was in great demand in opera roles throughout Sweden and northern Europe during the 1840s, and was closely associated with Felix Mendelssohn. After two acclaimed seasons in London, she announced her retirement from opera at the age of 29.

In 1850, Lind went to the United States at the invitation of the showman P. T. Barnum. She gave 93 large-scale concerts for him and then continued to tour under her own management. She earned more than $350,000 (equivalent to $13,545,000 in 2025) from these concerts, donating the proceeds to charities, principally the endowment of free schools in Sweden. With her new husband, Otto Goldschmidt, she returned to Europe in 1852, settling in England in 1855. She had three children and gave occasional concerts over the next three decades. From 1882, she was a professor of singing at the Royal College of Music in London for some years.

== Life and career ==
=== Early life ===
Born in Klara in central Stockholm, Sweden, Lind was the illegitimate daughter of Niclas Jonas Lind, a bookkeeper, and Anne-Marie Fellborg, a schoolteacher. Lind's mother had divorced her first husband for adultery but refused to remarry until after his death in 1834. Lind's parents married when she was fourteen.

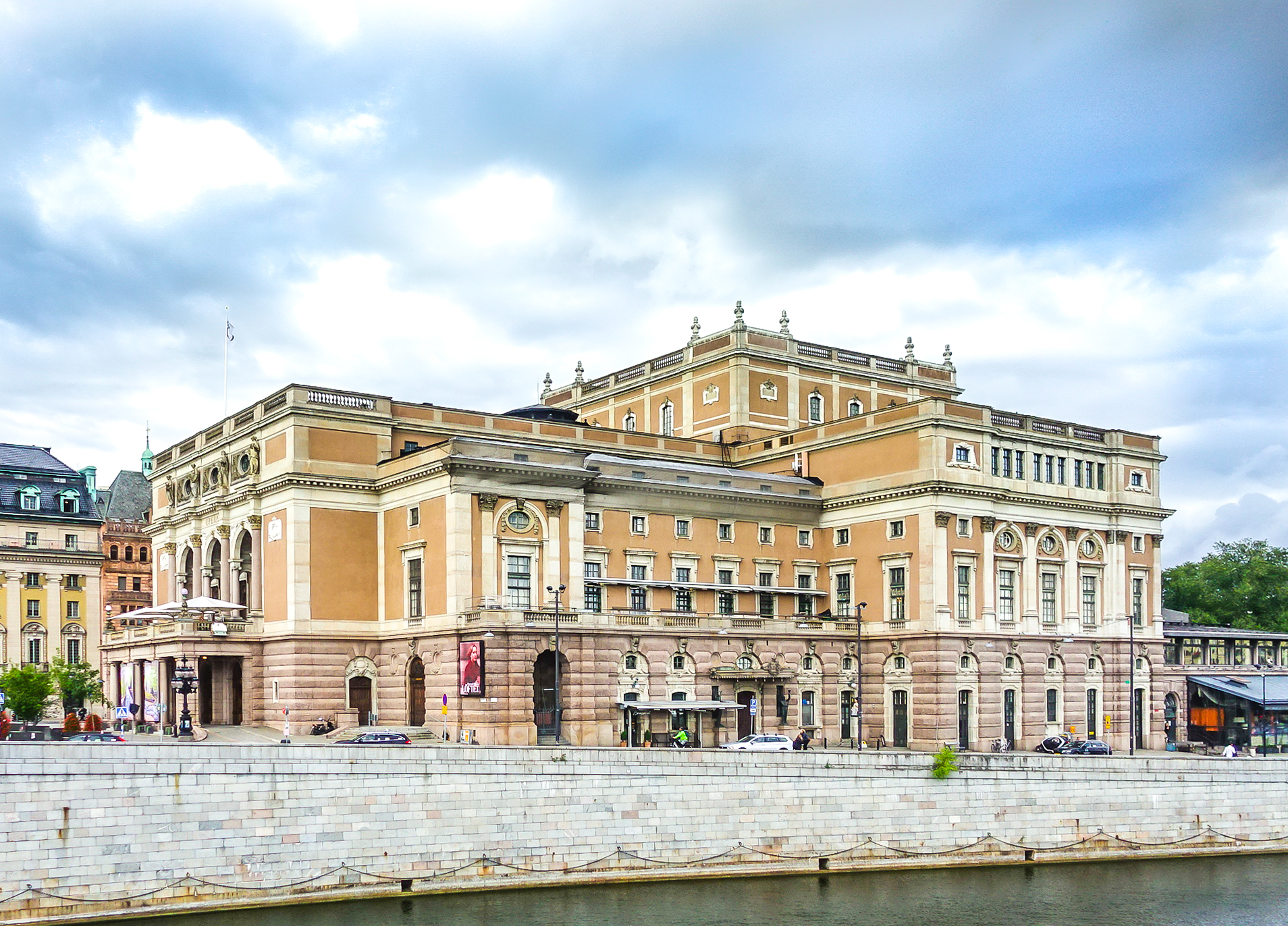
Royal Swedish Opera, Stockholm, where Lind sang some early roles

Lind's mother ran a day school for girls out of her home. When Lind was about nine, her singing was overheard by the maid of Mademoiselle Lundberg, the principal dancer at the Royal Swedish Opera. The maid, astounded by Lind's extraordinary voice, returned the next day with Lundberg, who arranged an audition and helped her gain admission to the Royal Dramatic Training Academy, the acting school of the Royal Dramatic Theatre, where she studied with Carl Magnus Craelius, the singing master at the theatre.

Lind began to sing onstage when she was ten. She had a vocal crisis at the age of twelve and had to stop singing for a time, but she recovered. Her first great role was Agathe in Weber's Der Freischütz in 1838 at the Royal Swedish Opera. At 20, she was a member of the Royal Swedish Academy of Music and court singer to the King of Sweden and Norway. Her voice became seriously damaged by overuse and untrained singing technique, but her career was saved by the singing teacher Manuel García with whom she studied in Paris from 1841 to 1843. He insisted that she should not sing at all for three months, to allow her vocal cords to recover, before he started to teach her a healthy and secure Bel canto vocal technique.

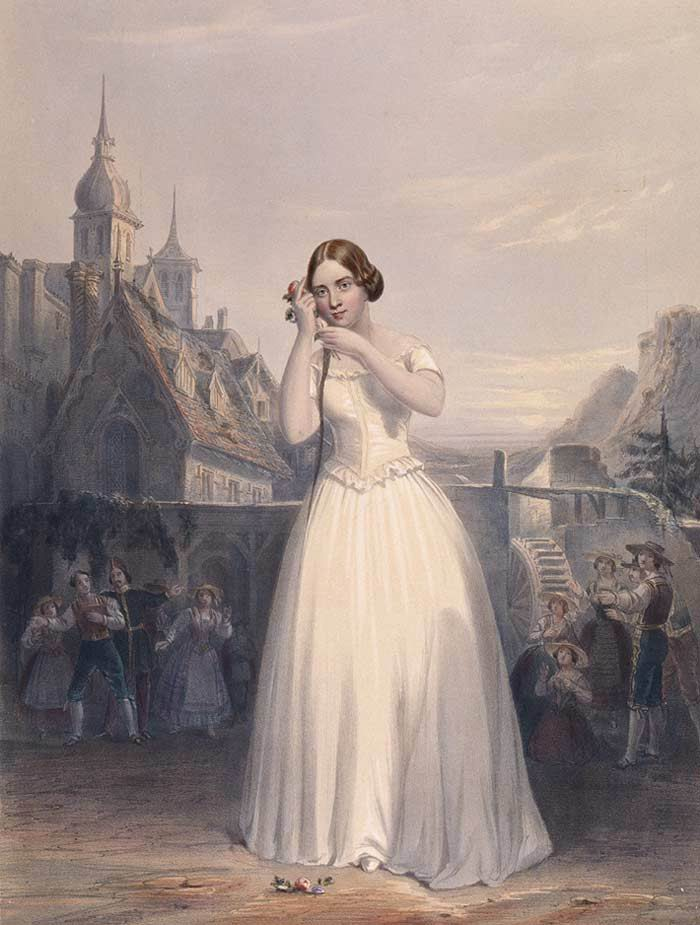
Lind as Amina in La sonnambula

After Lind had been with García for a year, the composer Giacomo Meyerbeer, an early and faithful admirer of her talent, arranged an audition for her at the Opéra in Paris, but she was rejected. The biographer Francis Rogers concludes that Lind strongly resented the rebuff: when she became an international star, she always refused invitations to sing at the Paris Opéra. Lind returned to the Royal Swedish Opera, greatly improved as a singer by García's training. She toured Denmark where, in 1843, Hans Christian Andersen met and fell in love with her. Although the two became good friends, she did not reciprocate his romantic feelings. She is believed to have inspired three of his fairy tales: "Beneath the Pillar", "The Angel" and "The Nightingale". He wrote, "No book or personality whatever has exerted a more ennobling influence on me, as a poet, than Jenny Lind. For me she opened the sanctuary of art." The biographer Carol Rosen believes that after Lind rejected Andersen as a suitor, he portrayed her as The Snow Queen with a heart of ice. (Note: Lind's relationship with Hans Christian Andersen was dramatised on American television in "The Second Day of Christmas", the 26 December 1955 episode of Robert Montgomery Presents, starring Lois Smith as Lind.)

=== German and British success ===
In December 1844, through Meyerbeer's influence, Lind was engaged to sing the title role in Bellini's opera Norma in Berlin. That led to more engagements in opera houses throughout Germany and Austria, but such was her success in Berlin that she continued there for four months before she left for other cities. Among her early admirers were Robert Schumann, Hector Berlioz and, most importantly for her, Felix Mendelssohn. Ignaz Moscheles wrote: "Jenny Lind has fairly enchanted me... her song with two concertante flutes is perhaps the most incredible feat in the way of bravura singing that can possibly be heard". That number, from Meyerbeer's Ein Feldlager in Schlesien (The Camp of Silesia, 1844, a role written for Lind but not premiered by her) became one of the songs most associated with Lind, and she was called on to sing it wherever she performed in concert. Her operatic repertoire included the title roles in Lucia di Lammermoor, Maria di Rohan, Norma, La sonnambula and La vestale as well as Susanna in The Marriage of Figaro, Adina in L'elisir d'amore and Alice in Robert le diable. According to Lindsay B. Yeates, "whilst the beauty of her voice was far greater than any other in living memory ([she was called] the Swedish Nightingale), what really set her apart was her outstanding ability to act". In December 1845, the day after her debut at the Leipzig Gewandhaus under the baton of Mendelssohn, she sang without fee for a charity concert in aid of the Orchestra Widows' Fund. Her devotion and generosity to charitable causes remained a key aspect of her career and greatly enhanced her international popularity even among the unmusical.

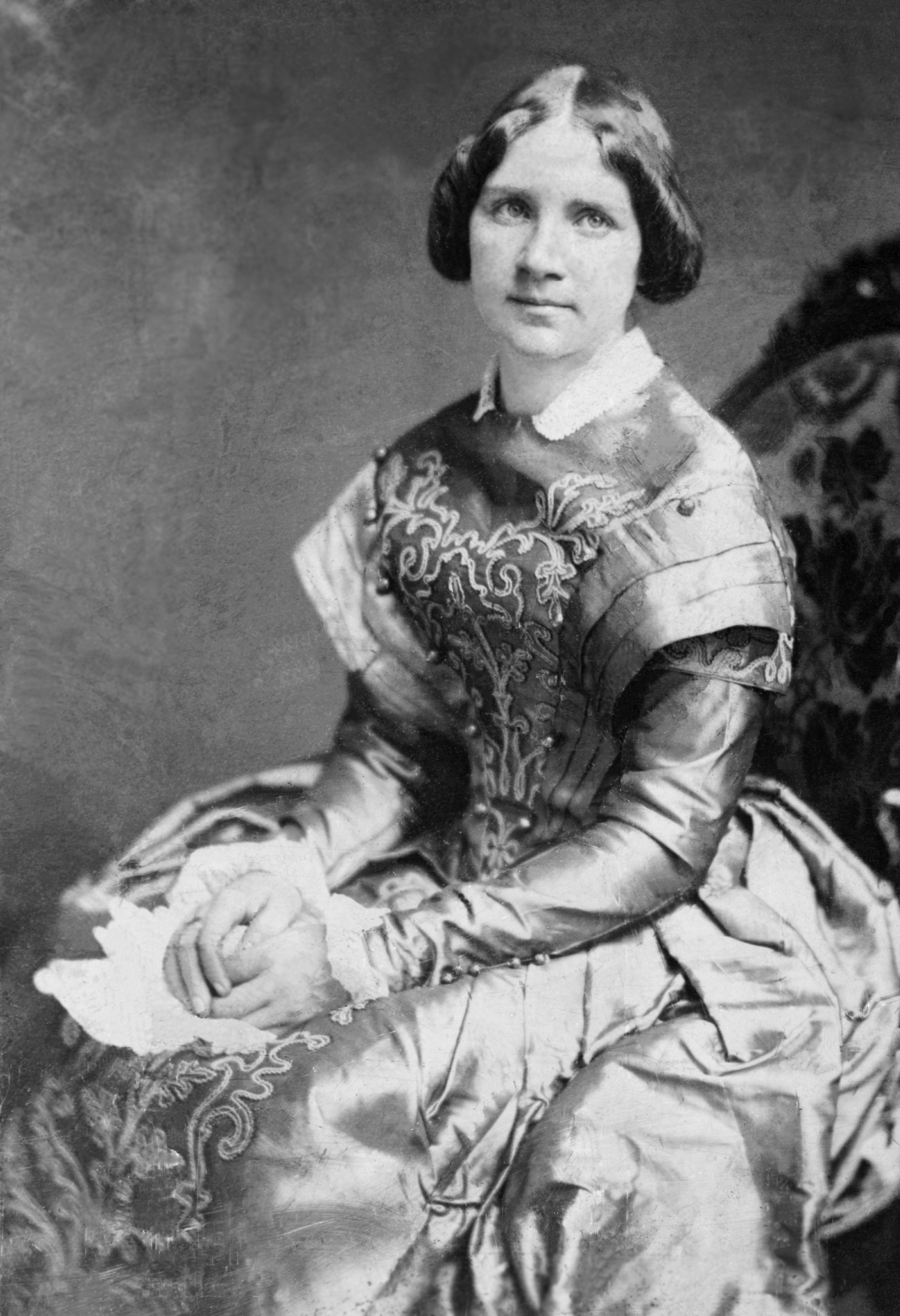
Daguerreotype of Lind, 1850

At the Royal Swedish Opera, Lind had been friends with the tenor Julius Günther. They sang together both in opera and on the concert stage and became romantically linked by 1844. Their schedules separated them, however, as Günther remained in Stockholm and then became a student of Garcia in Paris in 1846–1847. After reuniting in Sweden, according to Lind's 1891 Memoir, they became engaged to marry in the spring of 1848, just before Lind returned to England. However, the two broke off the engagement in October of the same year.

After a successful season in Vienna, where she was mobbed by admirers and feted by the Imperial Family, Lind travelled to London and gave her first performance there on 4 May 1847, when she appeared in an Italian version of Meyerbeer's Robert le diable. It was attended by Queen Victoria; the next day, The Times wrote:

We have had frequent experience of the excitement appertaining to "first nights", but we may safely say, and our opinion will be backed by several hundreds of Her Majesty's subjects, that we never witnessed such a scene of enthusiasm as that displayed last night on the occasion of Mademoiselle Jenny Lind's début as Alice in an Italian version of Robert le diable.

Queen Victoria attended each of Lind's sixteen debut performances in London. In July 1847, Lind starred in the world première of Verdi's opera I masnadieri at Her Majesty's Theatre, under the baton of the composer. In September of that year, Lind visited Manchester and Edinburgh, performing a concert in the latter city.

During her two years on the operatic stage in London, Lind appeared in most of the standard opera repertory. In early 1849, still in her twenties, Lind announced her permanent retirement from opera. Her last opera performance was on 10 May 1849 in Robert le diable; Queen Victoria and other members of the Royal Family were present. Lind's biographer Francis Rogers wrote, "The reasons for her early retirement have been much discussed for nearly a century, but remain today a matter of mystery. Many possible explanations have been advanced, but not one of them has been verified".

=== Lind and Mendelssohn ===
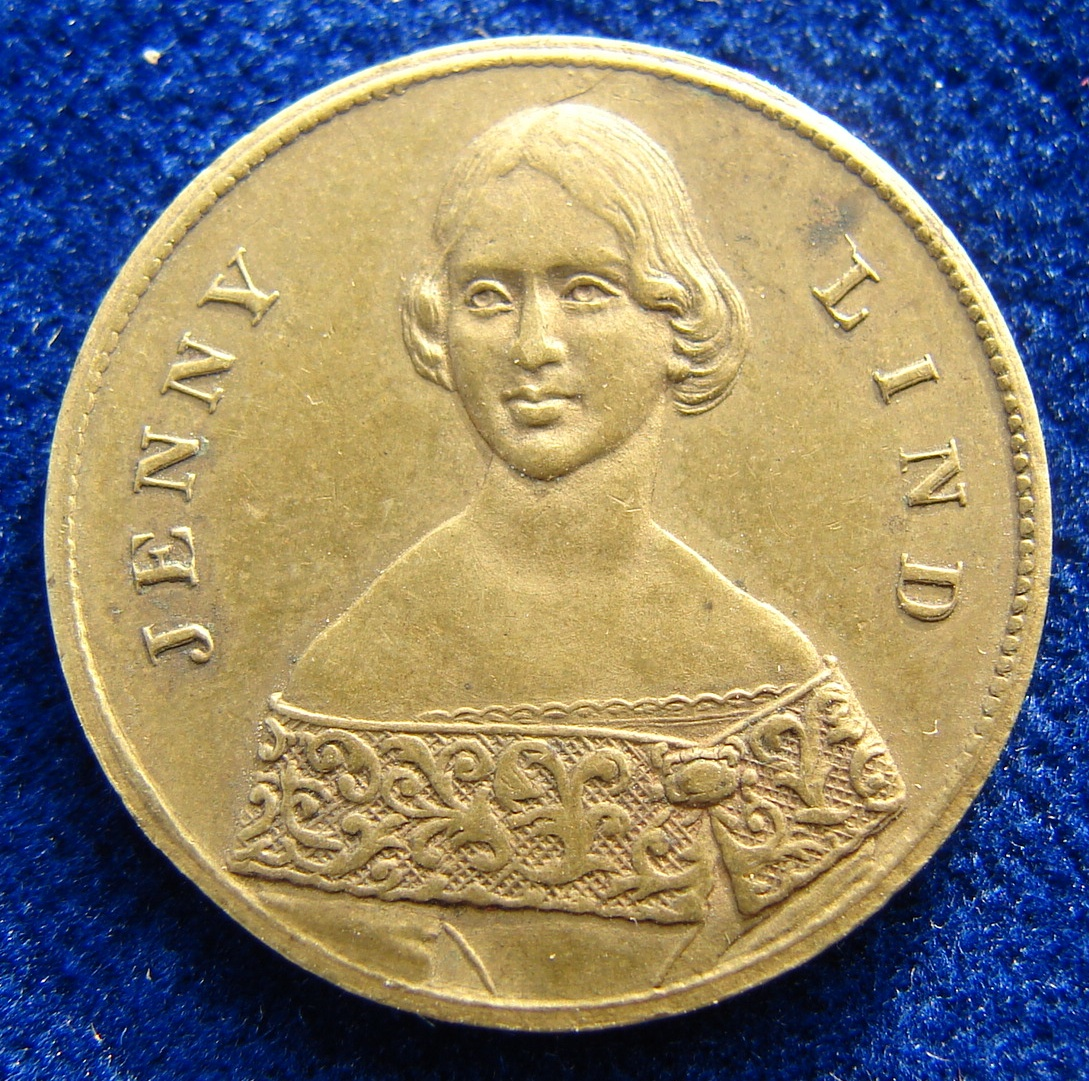
Jenny Lind Token ND issued c. 1850 for her US tour, obverse

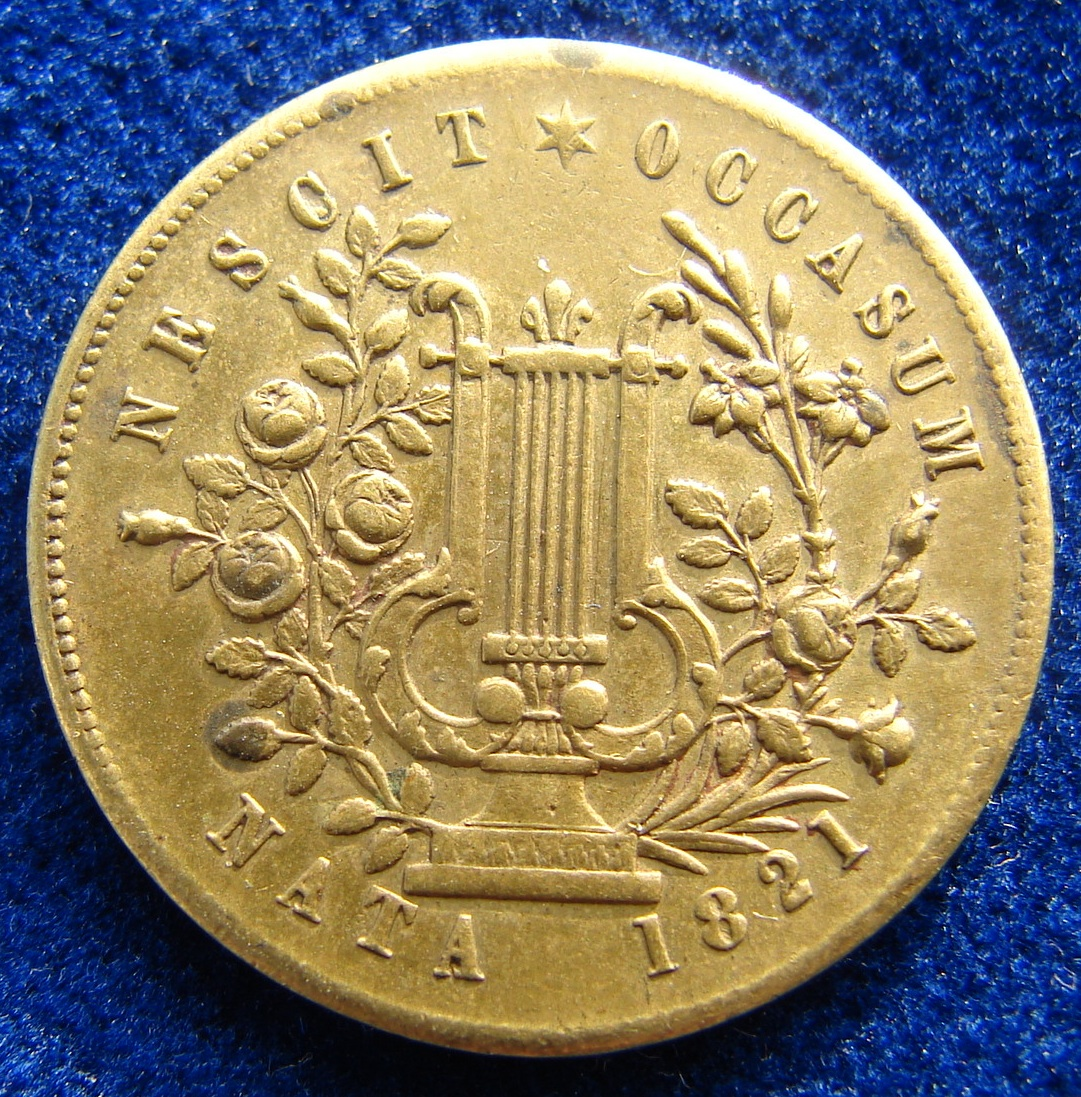
Token with wrong year of birth, 1821, reverse

In London, Lind's close friendship with Mendelssohn continued. There had been speculation that their relationship extended beyond friendship. In 2013, George Biddlecombe confirmed in the Journal of the Royal Musical Association that "The Committee of the Mendelssohn Scholarship Foundation possesses material indicating that Mendelssohn wrote passionate love letters to Lind entreating her to join him in an adulterous relationship and threatening suicide as a means of exerting pressure upon her, and that these letters were destroyed on being discovered after her death".

Mendelssohn was present at Lind's London debut in Robert le diable, and his friend, the critic Henry Chorley, who was with him, wrote: "I see as I write the smile with which Mendelssohn, whose enjoyment of Mdlle. Lind's talent was unlimited, turned round and looked at me, as if a load of anxiety had been taken off his mind. His attachment to Mademoiselle Lind's genius as a singer was unbounded, as was his desire for her success." Mendelssohn worked with Lind on many occasions and wrote the beginnings of an opera, Lorelei, for her, based on the legend of the Lorelei Rhine maidens; the opera was unfinished at his death. He composed the soprano aria in his oratorio Elijah ("Hear Ye Israel") with Lind's voice in mind, focusing the tessitura of the aria around F-sharp (F♯5), a note in her range that Mendelssohn supposedly found irresistibly charming.

Four months after her London debut, she was devastated by the premature death of Mendelssohn in November 1847. She did not at first feel able to sing the soprano part in Elijah, which he had written for her. She finally did so at a performance in London's Exeter Hall in late 1848, which raised £1,000 to fund a musical scholarship as a memorial to him; it was her first appearance in oratorio. The original intention had been to found a school of music in Mendelssohn's name in Leipzig, but there was not enough support there, and with the help of Sir George Smart, Julius Benedict and others, Lind eventually raised enough money to fund a scholarship "to receive pupils of all nations and promote their musical training". The first recipient of the Mendelssohn Scholarship was the 14-year-old Arthur Sullivan, whom Lind encouraged in his career.

=== American tour ===
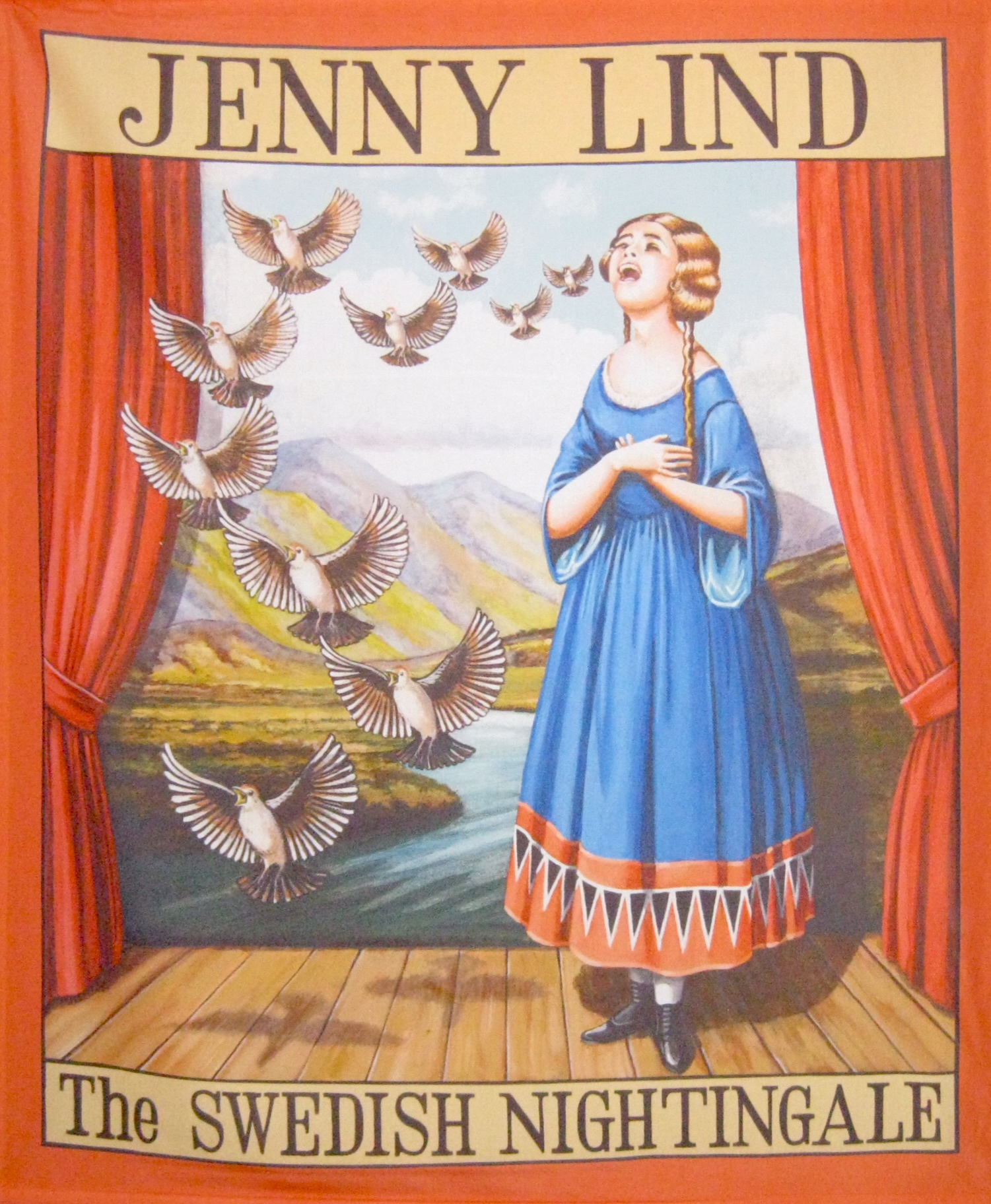
Barnum poster

In 1849, Lind was approached by the American showman P. T. Barnum with a proposal to tour throughout the United States, giving 150 concerts in eighteen months. Realising that it would yield large sums for charity, particularly the endowment of free schools in her native Sweden, Lind demanded a fixed fee of $1,000 per concert, and in January 1850 Barnum agreed.

Together with a supporting baritone, Giovanni Belletti, and her London colleague, Julius Benedict, as pianist, arranger and conductor, Lind sailed to America in September 1850. Barnum's advance publicity made her a celebrity even before she arrived in the US, and she received a wild reception on arriving in New York. Tickets for some of her concerts were in such demand that Barnum sold them by auction. The enthusiasm of the public was so strong that the American press coined the term "Lind mania".

Autograph of Lind after her marriage to Otto Goldschmidt

After her first two performances in New York in September 1850, Lind's party toured the east coast of the United States, with continued success, and later took in Cuba, the Southern US and Canada. By early 1851, Lind had become uncomfortable with Barnum's relentless marketing of the tour, and she invoked a contractual right to sever her ties with him; they parted amicably. She continued the tour for nearly a year, under her own management, until May 1852. Benedict left the party in 1851 to return to England, and Lind invited Otto Goldschmidt to replace him as pianist and conductor. Lind and Goldschmidt were married on 5 February 1852, near the end of the tour, in Boston. She used the name "Jenny Lind-Goldschmidt" (or "Jenny Goldschmidt Lind" or simply "Jenny Goldschmidt") both privately and professionally. (Note: A concert poster dated 9 May 1856, Victoria Rooms Clifton (Bristol, UK), names her as "Madame Jenny Goldschmidt Lind" once and "Madame Jenny Goldschmidt" six times.)

Details of the later concerts under her own management are scarce, but it is known that under Barnum's management Lind gave 93 concerts in the United States for which she earned about $350,000, and he netted at least $500,000 ($10.9 million and $15.6 million, as of 2021, respectively). She donated her profits to various charities, including free schools in Sweden and some US charities. The tour is a plot point in the 1980 musical Barnum and the 2017 film The Greatest Showman, both of which include a fictionalised relationship between Lind and Barnum with "romantic undertones".

At the time of her tour, the debate over slavery in the United States had been intensified by the Compromise of 1850. American abolitionists attempted to secure Lind's support for their cause, but she refused to comment on the institution. After meeting Lind in July 1851, British abolitionist Judith Griffiths wrote that "the colored people are regarded by her as beneath humanity – and too unworthy to be educated... She seemed horrified at colored people – I now know for myself that she is thoroughly pro-slavery – I am so grieved." Abolitionist lawyer Maunsell Field wrote that "she had an abhorrence for negroes she could not overcome. 'They are so ugly', she used to say." Yet in June 1852, Lind donated $100 to Harriet Beecher Stowe to free the Edmonsons, a Black family enslaved in Washington, D.C., praising Uncle Tom's Cabin as "having been a strong means in the Creator's hand of operating essential good in one of the most important questions for the welfare of our black brethren." Historian Joan D. Hedrick suggested that Stowe's book "may have changed Lind's heart".

=== Later years ===
Lind in her retirement

Lind and Goldschmidt returned to Europe together in May 1852. They lived first in Dresden, Germany, and, from 1855, in England for the rest of their lives. They had three children: Otto, born September 1853 in Germany, Jenny, born March 1857 in England, and Ernest, born January 1861 in England.

Although she refused all requests to appear in opera after her return to Europe, Lind continued to perform in the concert hall. In 1856, at the invitation of the Philharmonic Society conducted by William Sterndale Bennett, she sang the chief soprano part in the first English performance of the cantata Paradise and the Peri by Robert Schumann. In 1866, she gave a concert with Arthur Sullivan at St James's Hall. The Times reported, "there is magic still in that voice... the most perfect singing – perfect alike in expression and in vocalization... Nothing more engaging, nothing more earnest, nothing more dramatic can be imagined." At Düsseldorf in January 1870, she sang in Ruth, an oratorio composed by her husband. When Goldschmidt formed the Bach Choir in 1875, Lind trained the soprano choristers for the first English performance of Bach's B minor Mass in April 1876, and performed in the mass. Her concerts decreased in frequency until she retired from singing in 1883.

From 1879 until 1887, Lind worked with Frederick Niecks on his biography of Frédéric Chopin. In 1882, she was appointed professor of singing at the newly founded Royal College of Music. She believed in an all-round musical training for her pupils, insisting that, in addition to their vocal studies, they were instructed in solfège, piano, harmony, diction, deportment and at least one foreign language. Her students included German singer and composer Georgina Schubert. In 1868, Lind wrote that a singer's vowels must be rich in quality to form a sensation of "speak singing". She also stated that the different registers of the voice were unique to each individual and that each register needed to be trained individually and tailored to the specific singer's ability.

Lind lived her final years at Wynds Point, Herefordshire, on the Malvern Hills near the British Camp. Her last public appearance was at a charity concert at Royal Malvern Spa in 1883. She died of cancer at age 67 at Wynds Point on 2 November 1887, and was buried in the Great Malvern Cemetery to the music of Chopin's Funeral March. She bequeathed a considerable part of her wealth to help poor Protestant students in Sweden receive an education.

== Critical reputation ==
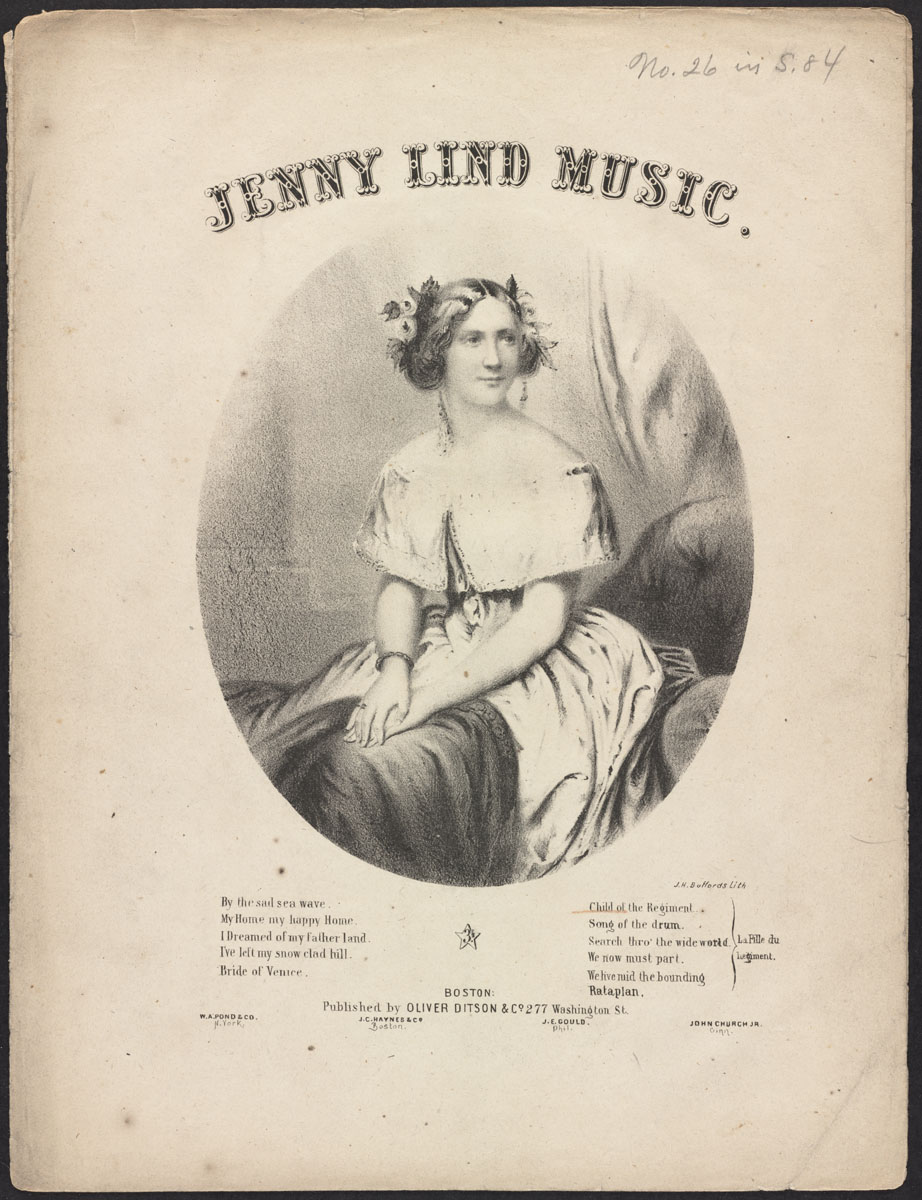
Sheet music cover

Reviews of Lind's performances in Europe were enthusiastic; those of her London debut were effusive and included the following:

Jenny Lind, undoubtedly the prima donna of the world entered. ... [We heard] the beautiful tones of a Sontag, united to the powers of a Grisi, the compass of a Malibran, the more than flexibility of a Persiani, and the correctness of intonation of the most perfect of musical instruments. It is ... so surpassingly beautiful – so superior to any other voice, uniting, as it does, the perfection of all voices. ... It is, in fact, itself the standard, as being the nearest approach to perfection of any voice ever heard. ... Truly has she been called the nightingale, for she possesses in the utmost perfection the "jug" note of the bird, and also that marvellous power of throwing, as it were, the warble into the distance – now dying away, and now swelling again, even as an organ does – a power possessed by no other human voice that we have ever heard.

Her biographer Francis Rogers noted his own and others' dissenting views, stating that although Lind was much admired by Meyerbeer, Mendelssohn, the Schumanns, Berlioz and others, "In voice and in dramatic talent she was undoubtedly inferior to her predecessors, Malibran and Pasta, and to her contemporaries, Sontag and Grisi." He concludes that because of her expert promoters, including Barnum, "almost all that was written about her was undoubtedly biased by an almost overwhelming propaganda in her favor, bought and paid for". Rogers says of Mendelssohn and Lind's other admirers that their tastes were "essentially Teutonic" and, except for Meyerbeer, they were not expert in Italian opera, Lind's early speciality. He quotes a critic of the New York Herald, who noted "little deficiencies in execution, in ascending the scale, which even enthusiasm cannot deprive of their sharpness". The American press agreed that Lind's presentation was more typical of Germanic "cold, untouching, icy purity of tone and style", rather than the passionate expression necessary for Italian opera, and the Herald wrote that her style was "suited to please the people of our cold climate. She will have triumphs here that would never attend her progress through France or Italy".

The critic H. F. Chorley, who admired Lind, described her voice as having "two octaves in compass – from D to D – having a higher possible note or two, available on rare occasions; (Note: of these "higher possible notes", Rogers quotes Chorley as follows: "In a song from Beatrice di Tenda which she adopted, there was a chromatic cadence, ascending to E in altissimo [i.e. E6], and descending to the note whence it had risen, which could not be paragoned, of late days, as an evidence of mastery and accomplishment.") and that the lower half of the register and the upper one were of two distinct qualities. The former was not strong – veiled, if not husky; and apt to be out of tune. The latter was rich, brilliant and powerful – finest in its highest portions." Chorley praised her breath management, her use of pianissimo, her taste in ornament and her intelligent use of technique to conceal the differences between her upper and lower registers. He thought her "execution was great" and that she was a "skilled and careful musician" but felt that "many of her effects on the stage appeared overcalculated" and that singing in foreign languages impeded her ability to give expression to the text. He felt that her concert singing was more admirable than her operatic performances, but he praised some of her roles. (Note: Chorley wrote of Lind's concerts: "The wild, queer, Northern tunes brought here by her – her careful expression of some of Mozart's great airs – her mastery over such a piece of execution as "The Bird Song" in Haydn's Creation – and lastly, the grandeur of inspiration with which the "Sanctus" of angels in Mendelssohn's Elijah was led by her (the culminating point in the Oratorio) – are so many things to leave on the mind of all who have heard them".) Chorley judged her finest work to be in the German repertoire, citing Mozart, Haydn and Mendelssohn's Elijah as best suited to her. Miller concluded that although connoisseurs of the voice preferred other singers, her wider appeal to the public at large was not merely a legend created by Barnum but was a mixture of "a uniquely pure (some called it celestial) quality in her voice, consistent with her well-known generosity and charity".

There are no known surviving recordings of Lind's voice. She is believed to have made an early phonograph recording for Thomas Edison, but in the words of the critic Philip L. Miller, "Even had the fabled Edison cylinder survived, it would have been too primitive, and she too long retired, to tell us much".

== Memorials and commemorations ==
Memorial in Westminster Abbey

Lind is commemorated in Poets' Corner, Westminster Abbey, London under the name "Jenny Lind-Goldschmidt". Among those present at the memorial's unveiling ceremony on 20 April 1894 were Goldschmidt, members of the Royal Family, Sullivan, Sir George Grove and representatives of some of the charities supported by Lind. There is also a plaque commemorating Lind in The Boltons, Kensington, London and a blue plaque at 189 Old Brompton Road, London, SW7, which was erected in 1909.

Lind has been commemorated in music, on stage and screen and even on banknotes. In the 1930 Hollywood film A Lady's Morals, Grace Moore starred as Lind, with Wallace Beery as Barnum. Comedienne Charlotte Arren humorously impersonated Lind in the 1935 Broadway revue Earl Carroll's Sketch Book. The Swedish opera singer Helga Görlin portrayed Lind in the 1937 Swedish historical drama film John Ericsson, Victor of Hampton Roads. In 1941 Ilse Werner starred as Lind in the German-language musical biography film The Swedish Nightingale. In 2001, a semibiographical film, Hans Christian Andersen: My Life as a Fairytale, featured Flora Montgomery as Lind. In 2005, Elvis Costello announced that he was writing an opera about Lind, called The Secret Arias with some lyrics by Andersen. A 2010 BBC television documentary "Chopin – The Women Behind the Music" includes discussion of Chopin's last years, during which Lind "so affected" the composer.

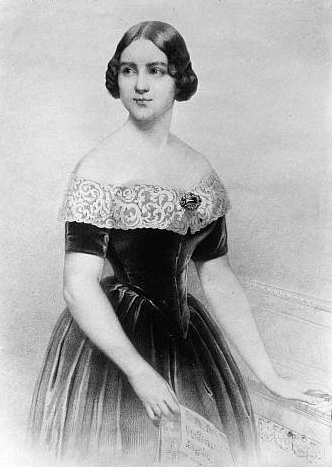
Lind standing at a keyboard

Both the 1996 and 2006 issues of the Swedish 50-krona banknote bear a portrait of Lind on the front. Many artistic works have honoured or featured her. Anton Wallerstein composed the "Jenny Lind Polka" around 1850. Many places and objects have been named for Lind, including Jenny Lind Island in Canada, the Jenny Lind locomotive and a clipper ship, the USS Nightingale. An Australian schooner was named Jenny Lind in her honour. In 1857, it was wrecked in a creek on the Queensland coast; the creek was accordingly named Jenny Lind Creek. A bronze statue of a seated Jenny Lind by Erik Rafael-Rådberg, dedicated in 1924, sits in the Framnäs section of Djurgården island in Stockholm.

In Britain, Goldschmidt's endowment of an infirmary for children in her honour in Norwich is perpetuated in its present form as the Jenny Lind Children's Hospital of the Norfolk and Norwich University Hospital. There is a Jenny Lind Park in the same city. A chapel is named for Lind at the University of Worcester City Campus. A hotel and pub is named after her in the Old Town of Hastings, East Sussex. Hereford County Hospital has a psychiatric ward named for Jenny Lind. A district in Glasgow is named after her. In Sutton, London, the pub "The Jenny Lind", next to Lind Road, has been renamed "The Nightingale".

In the US, Lind is commemorated by street names in Amelia, Ohio; Fort Smith, Arkansas; New Bedford, Massachusetts; Taunton, Massachusetts; McKeesport, Pennsylvania; North Easton, Massachusetts; North Highlands, California and Stanhope, New Jersey; and in the name of Jenny Lind, Arkansas. The town of Jenny Lind, California is likely named after her, although there are several tales about its naming. An elementary school in Minneapolis, Minnesota, and the Jenny Lind Tower, a stone tower in North Truro, Massachusetts, are named for her. She visited Mammoth Cave in central Kentucky in 1851, and a feature in the cave was named in her honour, called "Jenny Lind's Armchair". Cottage-style spindled furniture is still named for her, especially Jenny Lind cribs and beds. Andover, Illinois, has the Jenny Lind Chapel, a Swedish Lutheran Chapel that Lind donated $1,500 to construct. The Jenny Lind Wing is part of a student residence building at Augustana College, Rock Island, Illinois, which was founded by the Swedish Evangelical Lutheran Augustana Synod in North America in 1860. The college also named a Jenny Lind Vocal Ensemble. Jenny Lind soup is a soup named for her. The American Swedish Historical Museum's Jenny Lind Room is devoted to her and the lasting effects of her widespread popularity in America. Her 1850–1852 tour of America is a plot point in the 1980 musical Barnum and the 2017 film The Greatest Showman, both of which include a fictionalised relationship between Lind and Barnum with "romantic undertones".

Norwegian Air Shuttle's Boeing 737-8JP registration LN-DYG is called Jenny Lind and has a drawing of Lind on its tail.

== See also ==
- Justina Casagli
- Elisabeth Frösslind
- Elisabeth Olin
- Lina Sandell
- List of Swedes in music
- Jenny Lind locomotive, a 2-2-2 steam locomotive named after her.
- Jenny Lind and James Braid
